= Space tether missions =

Space technology using tethers

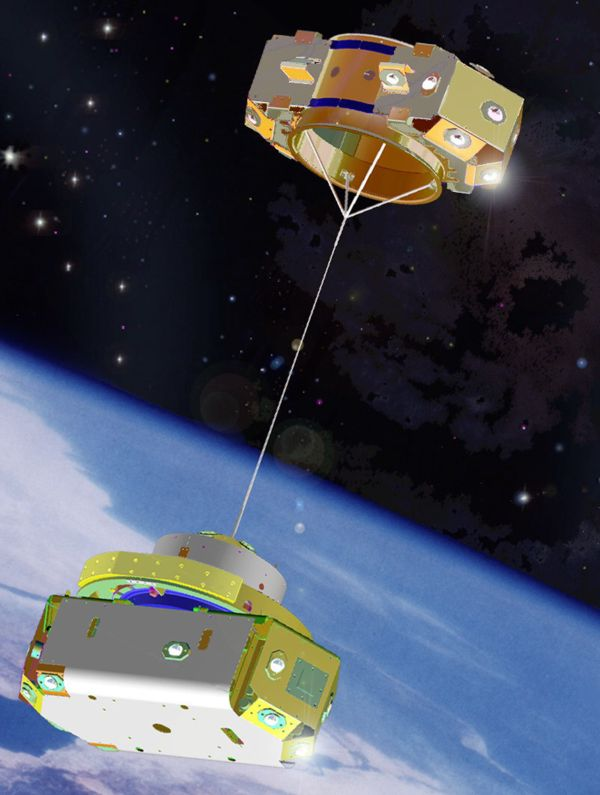
Graphic of the US Naval Research Laboratory's TiPS tether satellite. Note that only a small part of the 4 km tether is shown deployed.

A number of space tethers have been deployed in space missions. Tether satellites can be used for various purposes including research into tether propulsion, tidal stabilisation and orbital plasma dynamics.

The missions have met with varying degrees of success; a few have been highly successful.

== Description ==
Tethered satellites are composed of three parts: the base-satellite; tether; and sub-satellite. The base-satellite contains the sub-satellite and tether until deployment. Sometimes the base-satellite is another basic satellite, other times it could be a spacecraft, space station, or the Moon. The tether is what keeps the two satellites connected. The sub-satellite is released from the base assisted by a spring ejection system, centrifugal force or gravity gradient effects.

Tethers can be deployed for a range of applications, including electrodynamic propulsion, momentum exchange, artificial gravity, deployment of sensors or antennas etc. Tether deployment may be followed by a station-keeping phase (in particular if the target state is a vertical system orientation), and, sometimes, if the deployment system allows, a retraction.

The station-keeping phase and retraction phase need active control for stability, especially when atmospheric effects are taken into account. When there are no simplifying assumptions, the dynamics become overly difficult because they are then governed by a set of ordinary and partial nonlinear, non-autonomous and coupled differential equations. These conditions create a list of dynamical issues to consider:

- Three-dimensional rigid body dynamics (librational motion) of the station and subsatellite
- Swinging in-plane and out-of-plane motions of the tether of finite mass
- Offset of the tether attachment point from the base-satellite center of mass as well as controlled variations of the offset
- Transverse vibrations of the tether
- External forces

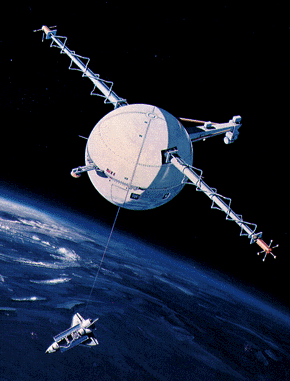
A NASA artist's rendering of a satellite tethered to the Space Shuttle.

== Tether flights on human space missions ==
=== Gemini 11 ===
In 1966, Gemini 11 deployed a 30 m (98 ft) tether which was stabilized by a rotation which gave 0.00015 g.

=== Shuttle TSS missions ===
==== TSS-1 mission ====
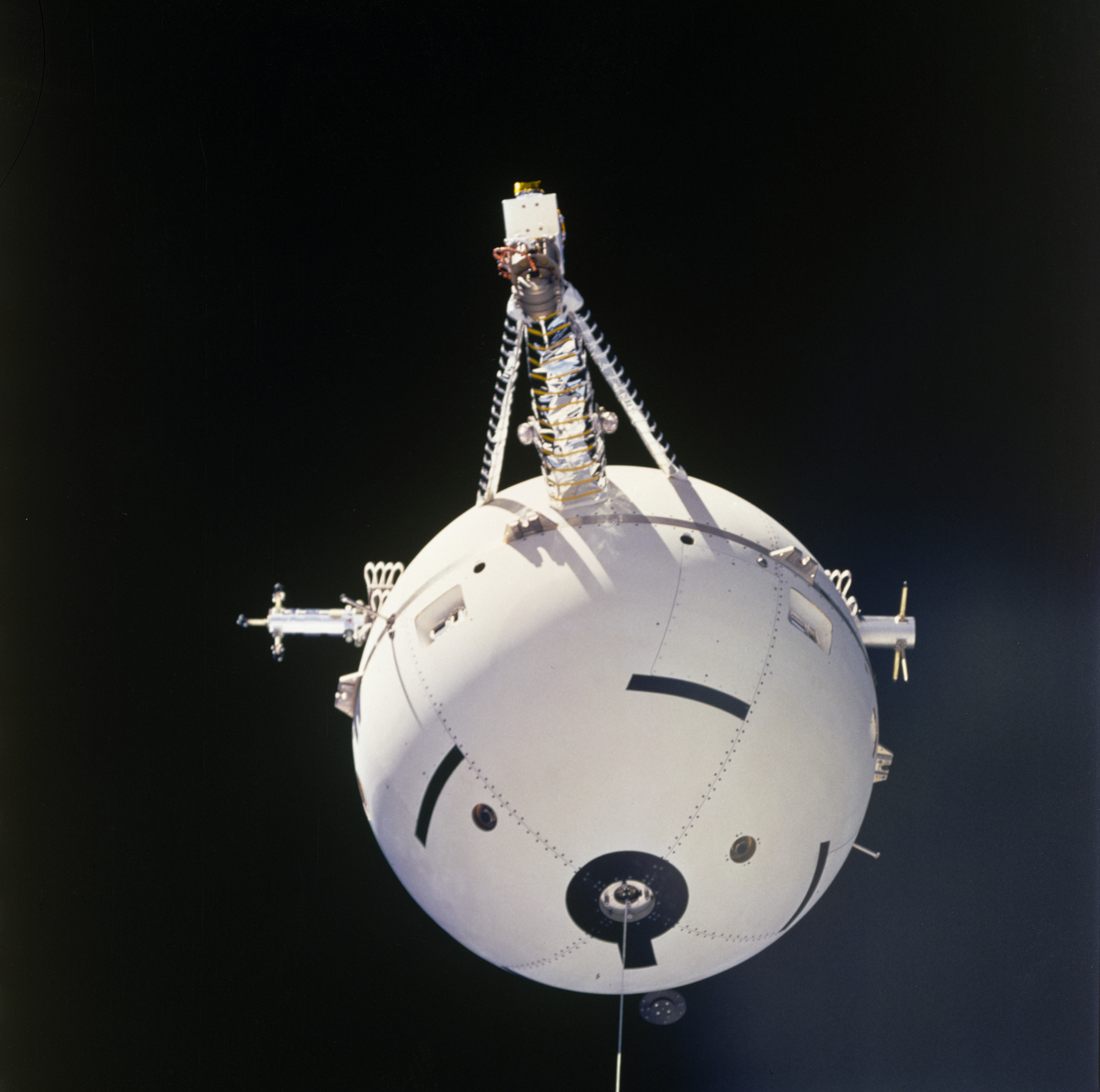
Close-up view of the Tethered Satellite System (TSS-1) in orbit above the Space Shuttle Atlantis.

Tethered Satellite System-1 (TSS-1) was proposed by NASA and the Italian Space Agency (ASI) in the early 1970s by Mario Grossi, of the Smithsonian Astrophysical Observatory, and Giuseppe Colombo, of Padua University. It was a joint NASA-Italian Space Agency project, was flown in 1992, during STS-46 aboard the Space Shuttle Atlantis from 31 July to 8 August.

The purposes of the TSS-1 mission were to verify the tether concept of gravity gradient stabilization, and to provide a research facility for investigating space physics and plasma electrodynamics. This mission uncovered several aspects about the dynamics of the tethered system, although the satellite did not fully deploy. It stuck at 78 meters; after that snag was resolved its deployment continued to a length of 256 meters (840 ft) before sticking again, where the effort finally ended (the total proposed length was 20,000 meters (66,000 ft)). A protruding bolt due to a late-stage modification of the deployment reel system, jammed the deployment mechanism and prevented deployment to full extension. Despite this issue, the results showed that the basic concept of long gravity-gradient stabilized tethers was sound. It also settled several short deployment dynamics issues, reduced safety concerns, and clearly demonstrated the feasibility of deploying the satellite to long distances.

The voltage and current reached using the short tether length were too low for most of the experiments to be run. However, low-voltage measurements were made, along with recording the variations of tether-induced forces and currents. New information was gathered on the "return-tether" current. The mission was reflown in 1996 as TSS-1R.

==== TSS-1R mission ====
Four years later, as a follow-up mission to TSS-1, the TSS-1R satellite was released in latter February 1996 from the Space Shuttle Columbia on the STS-75 mission. The TSS-1R mission objective was to deploy the tether 20.7 km (12.9 mi) above the orbiter and remain there collecting data. The TSS-1R mission was to conduct exploratory experiments in space plasma physics. Projections indicated that the motion of the long conducting tether through the Earth's magnetic field would produce an EMF that would drive a current through the tether system.

TSS-1R was deployed (over a period of five hours) to 19.7 km (12.2 mi) when the tether broke. The break was attributed to an electrical discharge through a broken place in the insulation.

Despite the termination of the tether deployment before full extension, the extension achieved was long enough to verify numerous scientific speculations. These findings included the measurements of the motional EMF, the satellite potential, the orbiter potential, the current in the tether, the changing resistance in the tether, the charged particle distributions around a highly charged spherical satellite, and the ambient electric field. In addition, a significant finding concerns the current collection at different potentials on a spherical endmass. Measured currents on the tether far exceeded predictions of previous numerical models by up to a factor of three. A more descriptive explanation of these results can be found in Thompson, et al. Improvements have been made in modeling the electron charging of the shuttle and how it affects current collection, and in the interaction of bodies with surrounding plasma, as well as the production of electrical power.

A second mission, TSS-2, had been proposed to use the tether concept for upper atmospheric experimentation, but was never flown.

== Tethers on satellite missions ==
Longer tether systems have also been used on satellite missions, both operationally (as yo-yo despin systems) and in missions designed to test tether concepts and dynamics.

=== Yo-yo despin ===
Short tether systems are commonly used on satellites and robotic space probes. Most notably, tethers are used in the "yo-yo de-spin" mechanism, often used in systems where a probe set spinning during a solid rocket injection motor firing, but needs the spin removed during flight. In this mechanism, weights on the end of long cables are deployed away from the body of the spinning satellite. When the cables are cut, much or all of the angular momentum of the spin is transferred to the discarded weights. As an example, the third stage of NASA's Dawn mission utilized two weights with 1.44 kg (3.2 lb) each deployed on 12-meter (39 ft) cables.

=== NASA Small Expendable Deployer System experiments ===
In 1993 and 1994, NASA launched three missions using the "Small Expendable Deployer System" (SEDS), which deployed 20 km (12 mi) (SEDS-1 and SEDS-2) and 500-meter (1,600 ft) (PMG) tethers attached to a spent Delta-II second stage. The three experiments were the first successful flights of long tethers in orbit, and demonstrated both mechanical and electrodynamic tether operation.

==== SEDS-1 ====
The first fully successful orbital flight test of a long tether system was SEDS-1, which tested the simple deploy-only Small Expendable Deployer System. The tether swung to the vertical and was cut after one orbit. This slung the payload and tether from Guam onto a reentry trajectory off the coast of Mexico. The reentry was accurate enough that a pre-positioned observer was able to videotape the payload re-entry and burnup.

==== SEDS-2 ====
SEDS-2 was launched on a Delta (along with a GPS Block 2 satellite) on 9 March 1994. A feedback braking limited the swing after deployment to 4°. The payload returned data for 8 hours until its battery died; during this time tether torque spun it up to 4 rpm. The tether suffered a cut 3.7 days after deployment. The payload reentered (as expected) within hours, but the 7.2 km (4.5 mi) length at the Delta end survived with no further cuts until re-entry on 7 May 1994. The tether was an easy naked-eye object when lit by the sun and viewed against a dark sky.

In these experiments, tether models were verified, and the tests demonstrated that a reentry vehicle can be downwardly deployed into a reentry orbit using tethers.

==== PMG ====
A follow-on experiment, the Plasma Motor Generator (PMG), used the SEDS deployer to deploy a 500-m tether to demonstrate electrodynamic tether operation.

The PMG was planned to test the ability of a Hollow Cathode Assembly (HCA) to provide a low–impedance bipolar electric current between a spacecraft and the ionosphere. In addition, other expectations were to show that the mission configuration could function as an orbit-boosting motor as well as a generator, by converting orbital energy into electricity. The tether was a 500 m length of insulated 18 gauge copper wire.

The mission was launched on 26 June 1993, as the secondary payload on a Delta II rocket. The total experiment lasted approximately seven hours. In that time, the results demonstrated that current is fully reversible, and therefore was capable of generating power and orbit boosting modes. The hollow cathode was able to provide a low–power way of connecting the current to and from the ambient plasma. This means that the HC demonstrated its electron collection and emission capabilities.

=== NRL, TiPS, and ATEx experiments ===
==== TiPS ====
The Tether Physics and Survivability Experiment (TiPS) was launched in 1996 as a project of the US Naval Research Laboratory; it incorporated a 4,000 meter tether. The two tethered objects were called "Ralph" and "Norton". TiPS was visible from the ground with binoculars or a telescope and was occasionally accidentally spotted by amateur astronomers. The tether broke in July 2006. This long-term statistical data point is in line with debris models published by J. Carroll after the SEDS-2 mission, and ground tests by D. Sabath from TU Muenchen. Predictions of a maximum of two years survivability for TiPS based on some other ground tests have shown to be overly pessimistic (e.g. McBride/Taylor, Penson). The early cut of the SEDS-2 therewith must be considered an anomaly possibly related to the impact of upper stage debris.

==== ATEx ====
The Advanced Tether Experiment (ATEx), was a follow on to the TiPS experiment, designed and built by the Naval Center for Space Technology. ATEx flew as part of the STEX (Space Technology Experiment) mission. ATEx had two end masses connected by a polyethylene tether that was intended to deploy to a length of 6 km (3.7 mi), and was intended to test a new tether deployment scheme, new tether material, active control, and survivability. ATEx was deployed on 16 January 1999 and ended 18 minutes later after deploying only 22 m of tether. The jettison was triggered by an automatic protection system designed to save STEX if the tether began to stray from its expected departure angle, which was ultimately caused by excessive slack tether. As a result of the deployment failure, none of the desired ATEx goals were achieved.

=== Young Engineers' Satellite (YES) ===
Artist's conception of the deployment of the YES2 tether experiment and Fotino capsule from the Foton spacecraft

==== YES ====
In 1997, the European Space Agency launched the Young Engineers' Satellite (YES) of about 200 kg (440 lb) into GTO with a 35 km (22 mi) double-strand tether, and planned to deorbit a probe at near-interplanetary speed by swinging deployment of the tether system. The orbit achieved was not as initially planned for the tether experiment and, for safety considerations, the tether was not deployed.

==== YES2 ====
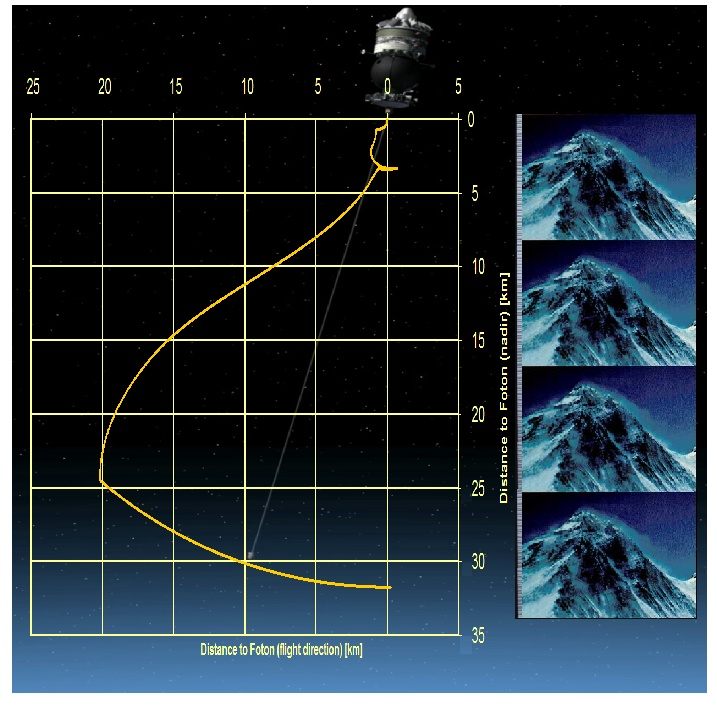
The reconstructed deployment of the YES2 tether, i.e., the trajectory of the Fotino capsule in relationship to the Foton spacecraft. Orbital motion is to the left. The Earth is down. Mount Everest is shown several times for scale. The Fotino was released at the vertical, 32 km below Foton, about 240 km above the surface of the Earth, and made a re-entry towards Kazakhstan.

10 years after YES, its successor, the Young Engineers' Satellite 2 (YES2) was flown. The YES2 was a 36 kg student-built tether satellite, part of ESA's Foton-M3 microgravity mission. The YES2 satellite employed a 32 km tether to deorbit a small re-entry capsule, "Fotino." The YES2 satellite was launched on 14 September 2007 from Baikonur. The communications system on the capsule failed, and the capsule was lost, but deployment telemetry indicated that the tether deployed to full length and that the capsule presumably deorbited as planned. It has been calculated that Fotino was inserted into a trajectory towards a landing site in Kazakhstan, but no signal was received. The capsule was not recovered.

=== KITE Experiment ===
The Kounotori Integrated Tether Experiment (KITE) was a test of tether technology on the Japanese H-II Transfer Vehicle (HTV) 6 space station resupply vehicle, launched by the Japan Aerospace Exploration Agency (JAXA) in December 2016. After undocking from the International Space Station on 27 January 2016, it was intended to deploy a 700-meter (2,300 feet) electrodynamic tether, however, a failure resulted in the tether not deploying. The vehicle burned up in the atmosphere without deployment. The experiment did successful demonstrate a carbon nanotube field-emission cathode.

=== CubeSat tether missions ===
CubeSats are small, low-cost satellites that are typically launched as secondary payloads on other missions, often built and operated as student projects. Several CubeSat missions have attempted to deploy tethers, so far without success.

==== MAST ====
The Multi-Application Survivable Tether (MAST) launched three 1-kg CubeSat modules with a 1-km tether. Two of the CubeSat modules ("Ted" and "Ralph") were intended as end-masses on the deployed tether, while the third ("Gadget") served as a climber that could move up and down the tether. The experiment used a multi-line "Hoytether" designed to be damage–resistant. The objectives of the MAST experiment were to obtain on-orbit data on the survivability of space tethers in the micrometeorite/debris orbital environment, to study the dynamics of tethered formations of spacecraft and rotating tether systems, and to demonstrate momentum-exchange tether concepts. The experiment hardware was designed under a NASA Small Business Technology Transfer (STTR) collaboration between Tethers Unlimited, Inc. and Stanford University, with TUI developing the tether, tether deployer, tether inspection subsystem, satellite avionics, and software, and Stanford students developing the satellite structures and assisting with the avionics design, as a part of the University CubeSat program.

In April 2007 the MAST was launched as a secondary payload on a Dnepr rocket into a 98°, 647 km × 782 km (402 mi × 486 mi) orbit. The experiment team made contact with the "Gadget" picosatellite, but not with "Ted", the tether-deployer picosatellite. While the system was designed so that the satellites would separate even if communications were not established to the tether deployer, the system did not fully deploy. Radar measurements show the tether deployed just 1 meter.

==== STARS, STARS-II, and STARS-C ====
The Space Tethered Autonomous Robotic Satellite (STARS or Kukai) mission, developed by the Kagawa Satellite Development Project at Kagawa University, Japan, was launched 23 January 2009 as a CubeSat secondary payload aboard H-IIA flight 15, which also launched GOSAT. After launch, the satellite was named KUKAI, and consisted of two subsatellites, "Ku" and "Kai," to be linked by a 5-meter (16 ft) tether. It was successfully separated from the rocket and transferred into the planned orbit, but the tether deployed only to a length of several centimeters, "due to the launch lock trouble of the tether reel mechanism."

A follow-on satellite, STARS-II, was a 9 kg (20 lb) satellite designed to fly a 300 m (980 ft) electrodynamic tether made from ultra-thin wires of stainless steel and aluminium. One objective of this program was to demonstrate possible technology for de-orbiting space debris. The mission launched on 27 February 2014 as a secondary payload aboard an H-2A rocket, and re-entered two months later, on 26 April 2014. The experiment was only partially successful, and tether deployment could not be confirmed. The orbit decayed from 350 km (220 mi) to 280 km (170 mi) in 50 days, considerably faster than the other CubeSats launched on the same mission, an indirect indication that its tether deployed, increasing the drag. However, telescopic photography of the satellite from the ground showed the satellite as a single point, rather than two objects. The experimenters suggest that this may have been due to the tether extending, but being tangled by rebound.

A third STARS mission, the STARS-C cubesat, was a 2U cubesat designed to deploy a 100 m (330 ft) aramid fiber tether with a diameter of 0.4 mm (0.016 in) between a mother satellite and a daughter satellite. The cubesat was designed by a team from Shizuoka University. The satellite has a mass of 2.66 kg (5.9 lb). It was launched on 9 December 2016, from the JEM Small Satellite Orbital Deployer on the International Space Station, and re-entered on 2 March 2018. However, the signal quality was intermittent, possibly due to failure of deployment of the solar panel, and data on tether deployment was not obtained. Estimates from orbital drag measurements suggest that the tether deployed to a length of about 30 meters.

==== ESTCube-1 ====
ESTCube-1 was an Estonian mission to test an electric sail in orbit, launched in 2013. It was designed to deploy a tether using centrifugal deployment, but the tether failed to deploy.

==== TEPCE ====
Tether Electrodynamic Propulsion CubeSat Experiment (TEPCE) was a Naval Research Laboratory electrodynamic tether experiment based on a "triple CubeSat" configuration, which was built by 2012 and due to be launched in 2013, but eventually launched as a secondary payload as part of the STP-2 launch on a Falcon Heavy in June 2019. The tether deployed in November 2019 to detect electrodynamic force on the tether's orbit. TEPCE used two nearly identical endmasses with a STACER spring between them to start the deployment of a 1 km long braided-tape conducting tether. Passive braking was used to reduce speed and hence recoil at the end of deployment. The satellite was intended to drive an electrodynamic current in either direction. It was intended to be able to raise or lower the orbit by several kilometers per day, change libration state, change orbit plane, and actively maneuver. A large change in its decay rate on 17 November suggests the tether was deployed on that date, leading to its rapid reentry, which occurred on 1 February 2020.

==== MiTEE ====
The Miniature Tether Electrodynamics Experiment (MiTEE) from the University of Michigan is a cubesat experiment designed measure electrical current along a tether at different lengths between 10 and 30 meters (33 and 98 ft). It was to deploy a subsatellite of approximately 8 cm × 8 cm × 2 cm (3.15 in × 3.15 in × 0.79 in) from a 3U CubeSat to test satellite electrodynamics tethers in the space environment.

In 2015, NASA selected MiTEE as a University CubeSat Space Mission Candidate, and the project successfully delivered hardware for flight.

In January 2021, MiTEE-1 launched to space on Virgin Orbit's LauncherOne test flight.

== Sounding rocket flights ==
=== CHARGE 2 ===
The Cooperative High Altitude Rocket Gun Experiment (CHARGE) 2 was jointly developed by Japan and NASA, to observe the current collection along with other phenomena. The major objective was to measure the payload charging and return currents during periods of electron emission. Secondary objectives were related to plasma processes associated with direct current and pulsed firings of a low-power electron beam source. On 14 December 1985, the CHARGE mission was launched at White Sands Missile Range, New Mexico. The results indicated that it is possible to enhance the electron current collection capability of positively charged vehicles by means of deliberate neutral gas releases into an undisturbed space plasma. In addition, it was observed that the release of neutral gas or argon gas into the undisturbed plasma region surrounding a positively biased platform has been found to cause enhancements to electron current collection. This was due to the fact that a fraction of the gas was ionized, which increased the local plasma density, and therefore the level of return current.

=== OEDIPUS ===
OEDIPUS ("Observations of Electric-field Distribution in the Ionospheric Plasma — a Unique Strategy") consisted of two sounding rocket experiments that used spinning, conductive tethers as a double probe for measurements of weak electric fields in the aurora. They were launched using Black Brant 3-stage sounding rockets. OEDIPUS A launched on 30 January 1989 from Andøya in Norway. The tethered payload consisted of two spinning subpayloads with a mass of 84 and 131 kg, connected by a spinning tether. The flight established a record for the length of an electrodynamic tether in space at that time, 958 m (3,143 ft). The tether was a teflon-coated, stranded tin-copper wire of 0.85 mm (0.033 in) diameter and it was deployed from a spool-type reel located on the forward subpayload.

OEDIPUS C was launched on 6 November 1995 from the Poker Flat Research Range north of Fairbanks, Alaska on a Black Brant XII sounding rocket. The flight reached an apogee of 843 km (524 mi) and deployed a tether of the same type used in the OEDIPUS-A to a length of 1,174 m (3,852 ft). It included a Tether Dynamics Experiment to derive theory and develop simulation and animation software for analyses of multi–body dynamics and control of the spinning tether configuration, provide dynamics and control expertise for the suborbital tethered vehicle and for the science investigations, develop an attitude stabilization scheme for the payloads and support OEDIPUS C payload development, and acquire dynamics data during flight to compare with pre-flight simulation.

=== T-Rex ===
On 31 August 2010, an experiment by the Japan Aerospace Exploration Agency (JAXA) on space tether experiment called "Tether Technologies Rocket Experiment" (T-REX), sponsored by the Japanese Aerospace Exploration Agency (ISAS/JAXA), was launched on sounding rocket S-520-25 from Uchinoura Space Center, Japan, reaching a maximum altitude of 309 km (192 mi). T-Rex was developed by an international team led by the Kanagawa Institute of Technology/Nihon University to test a new type of electrodynamic tether (EDT). The 300 m (980 ft) tape tether deployed as scheduled and a video of deployment was transmitted to the ground. Successful tether deployment was verified, as was the fast ignition of a hollow cathode in the space environment.

The experiment demonstrated a "Foldaway Flat Tether Deployment System". The educational experiment featured the first bare tape tether deployment (i.e. without insulation, the tether itself acts as anode and collects electrons). 130 m (430 ft) of the total of 300 m (980 ft) of tether was deployed fire-hose style, purely driven by inertia and limited by friction, following a powerful, spring-initiated ejection. Accurate differential GPS data of the deployment was recorded, and video taken from the endmasses.

== Proposed missions ==
=== ProSEDS ===
The use of a bare section of a space-borne electrodynamic tether for an electron-collection device has been suggested as a promising alternative to end-body electron collectors for certain electrodynamic tether applications. The bare-tether concept was to be tested first during NASA's Propulsive Small Expendable Deployer System (ProSEDS) mission. While the mission was canceled after NASA's space shuttle Columbia accident, the concept could potentially be undertaken in the future.

=== EDDE ===
ElectroDynamic Debris Eliminator (EDDE) was proposed in 2012 as an affordable system to deorbit or gather large orbital debris. The tether is flat for resistance to micromeroid impacts, and would carry large solar panels.
