= Antenna farm =

Area dedicated to radio transmitting

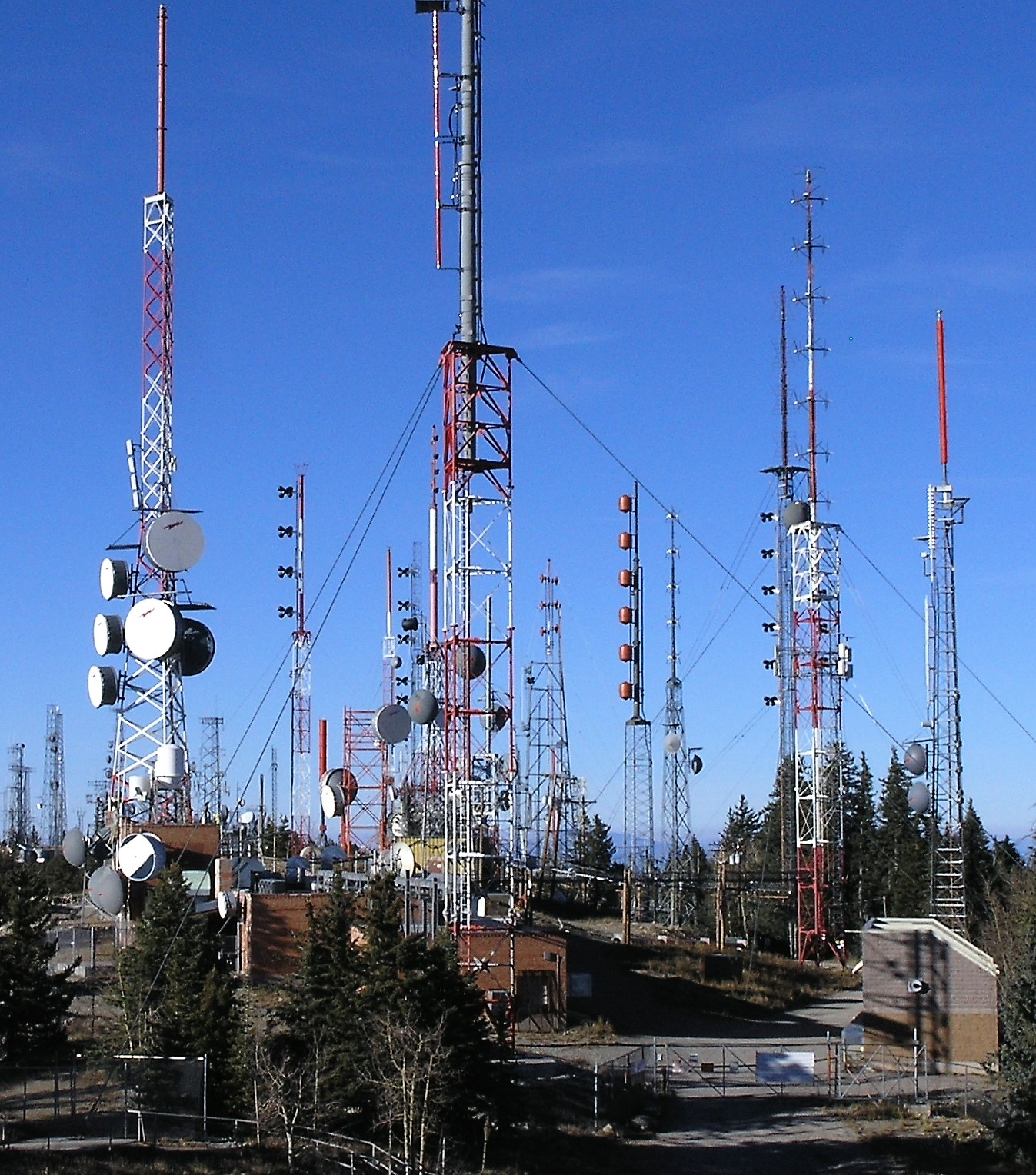
Antenna farm on Sandia Peak near Albuquerque, New Mexico, USA

An antenna farm, satellite dish farm or dish farm is an area dedicated to television or radio telecommunications transmitting or receiving antenna equipment, such as C, K_{u} or K_{a} band satellite dish antennas, UHF/VHF/AM/FM transmitter towers or mobile cell towers. The history of the term "antenna farm" is uncertain, but it dates to at least the 1950s.

In telecom circles, any area with more than three antennas could be referred to as an antenna farm. In the case of an AM broadcasting station (mediumwave and longwave, occasionally shortwave), the multiple mast radiators may all be part of an antenna system for a single station, while for VHF and UHF the site may be under joint management. Alternatively, a single tower with many separate antennas is often called a "candelabra tower".

== Safety and security ==
Commercial antenna farms are managed by radio stations, television stations, satellite teleports or military organizations and are mostly very secure facilities with access limited to broadcast engineers, RF engineers or maintenance technicians. This is not only for the physical security of the location (including preventing equipment/metal theft), but also for safety, as there may be a radiation (closer to daylight or radiant heat in energy level, much less disruptive to cellular activity than emissions from radioactive elements or x-ray machines) hazard unless stations are powered-down.

== Locations ==
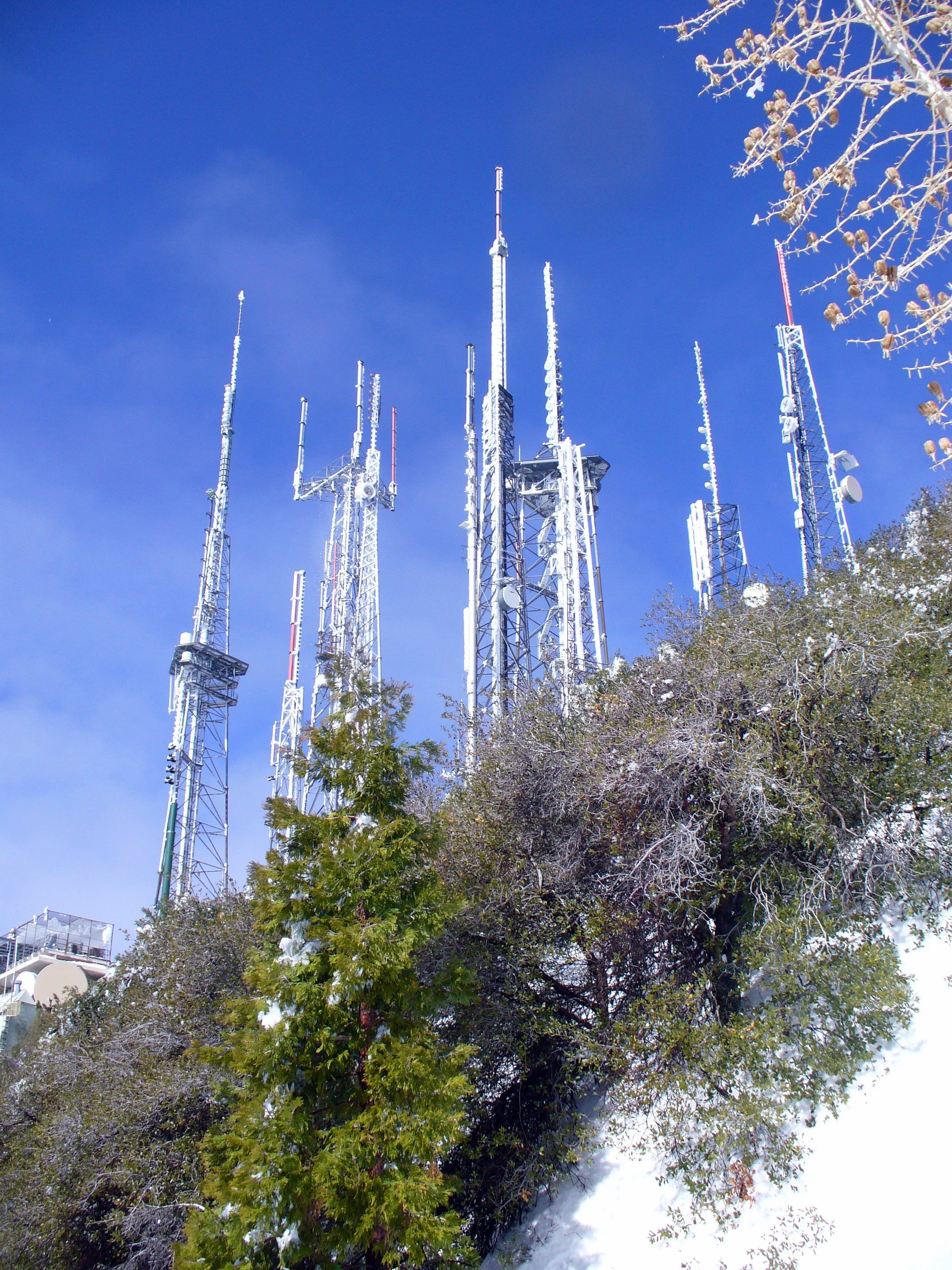
Antennas on Mount Wilson, covered in ice

Where terrain and road access allows, mountaintop sites are very attractive for non-AM broadcast stations and others, because it increases the stations' height above average terrain, allowing them to reach further by avoiding obstructions on the ground, and by increasing the radio horizon. With a clearer line of sight in both cases, more signal can be received. While the same is true of a very tall tower, like Paris’ Eiffel Tower, such towers are expensive, dangerous, and difficult to access the top of, and may collect and drop large amounts of ice in winter, or even collapse in a severe ice storm and/or high winds. Multiple small towers also allow stations to have backup facilities co-located on each other's towers for redundancy.

Satellite antenna farms are usually located at remote locations, far away from urban development, especially high rise buildings or airplane flight paths, to avoid and minimize disruption to transmission and reception, and so as to not be an eyesore. Although most radio and TV stations are in fierce competition with each other in their broadcast markets, they will often locate their broadcasting antennas very near each other, and in some cases, will even share land or towers with each other, in the interests of space, land availability, and the cost of putting a transmission building on top of a mountain.

=== In the United States ===
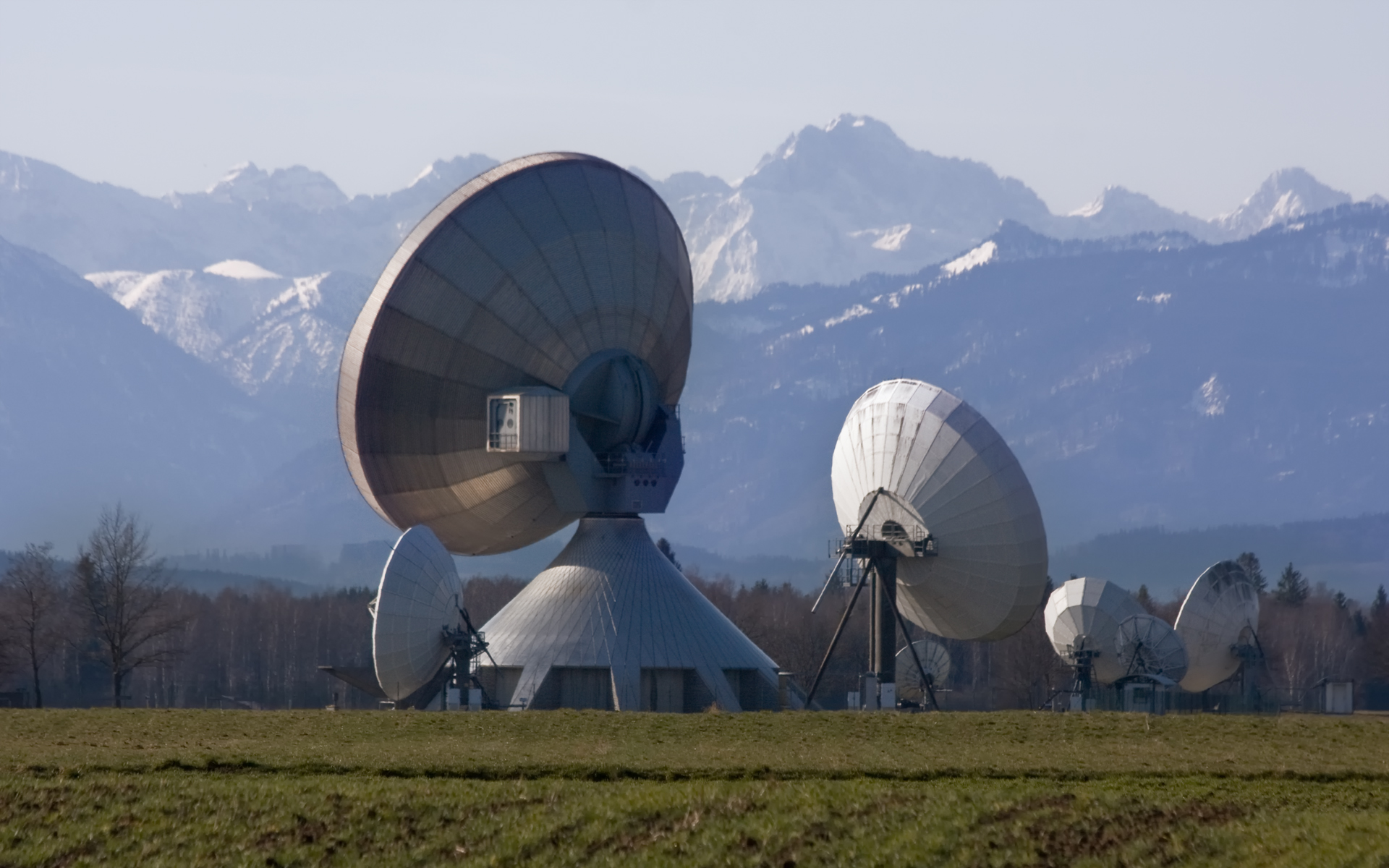
The dish farm at the Raisting Satellite Earth Station complex and Telehouse, Germany's largest satellite communications facility in Raisting, Bavaria, Germany

Most metropolitan areas have at least one antenna farm, such as: Dedham/Needham in the metro Boston market, Mount Wilson in greater Los Angeles (seen at right), Sweat Mountain in metro Atlanta, Farnsworth Peak for the Salt Lake Valley, Riverview in Tampa, Florida, Baltimore's Television Hill and Slide Mountain (Mount Rose ski area) in the Reno/Tahoe area. Some cities instead have combined many stations onto one tower, often through diplexers into just one or two antennas, such as atop the Empire State Building in New York, the landmark Sutro Tower of San Francisco, or the huge Miami Gardens tower serving the Miami and Fort Lauderdale region. Cleveland, Ohio has its antenna farm in the suburb of Parma, Ohio due to Parma's high elevation. In central Oklahoma City most of the city's media outlets transmitter and tower facilities are located between the Kilpatrick Turnpike to the south and Interstate 44 to the north, Broadway Extension to the west and Interstate 35 to the east with Britton Road being the central thoroughfare. In addition, all three network affiliates and one of the 3 major radio groups have their studio facilities located within the Oklahoma City tower farm.

In the Appalachian Mountains of the Eastern United States, Poor Mountain serves most of the FM and TV stations in the Roanoke/Lynchburg market. Holston Mountain in upper East Tennessee is home to most of the FM and TV stations in the Tri-Cities (Bristol, Virginia-Kingsport, Tennessee-Johnson City, Tennessee) DMA. Other examples are Signal Mountain near Chattanooga, Tennessee, Sharp's Ridge in Knoxville, Tennessee, and Paris Mountain in Greenville, South Carolina.

Other examples of co-located towers on mountain peaks in the United States are on Red Mountain in Birmingham, Alabama; Mount Wilson near Los Angeles; the Sutro Tower in Clarendon Heights near Mount Sutro in San Francisco; Lookout Mountain, Colorado near Denver; Cedar Hill between Dallas and Fort Worth; South Mountain Park near Phoenix; Nelson Peak near Salt Lake City; Sandia Crest near Albuquerque, New Mexico.

Probably the most famous broadcast antenna farm of all is the World Trade Center Tower One, on which many of the New York City television and several FM stations had their antennas. All were lost when Twin Towers One and Two collapsed after the September 11 attacks in 2001. Most of those stations reverted to broadcasting from their previous home, 200 feet lower, on the Empire State Building.

== Objections ==
Antenna farms have often been the source of complaints from local neighborhoods, particularly when a new tower is added. This has been increasingly so for TV stations, which have been pursuing with alacrity the construction of new digital television antennas. Because many of these towers are already full, or were built well before there was the expectation of DTV, many stations have been forced to go through the even greater expense of constructing a new tower.

One such situation was in Colorado, in the late 1990s and early to mid-2000s. Many of the Denver metropolitan area TV stations already transmitted analog TV from Lookout Mountain, but needed the extra space for more antennas. Additionally, since many people live on Lookout Mountain, there was also the concern about safety, not only from falling ice or even the slight risk of a tower collapse, but also ongoing from the additional RF that it would create. Residents and the city of Golden filed legal objections, including challenging the authority of the Federal Communications Commission (FCC) to override denial of zoning permits by local government (in this case, the Jefferson county commission). The city of Golden also sought to condemn the site, even though it was outside city limits. It was decided that scenic Eldorado Mountain near Boulder might be a better site, but there were also objections that it would ruin the view of that mountain from the valley. Despite other alternatives, the new "supertower" was forced on Lookout Mountain by the U.S. Congress, allowing the existing towers to be removed in 2009 after analog shutdown. The site began operating in spring 2008.

== Antenna farm requirements ==
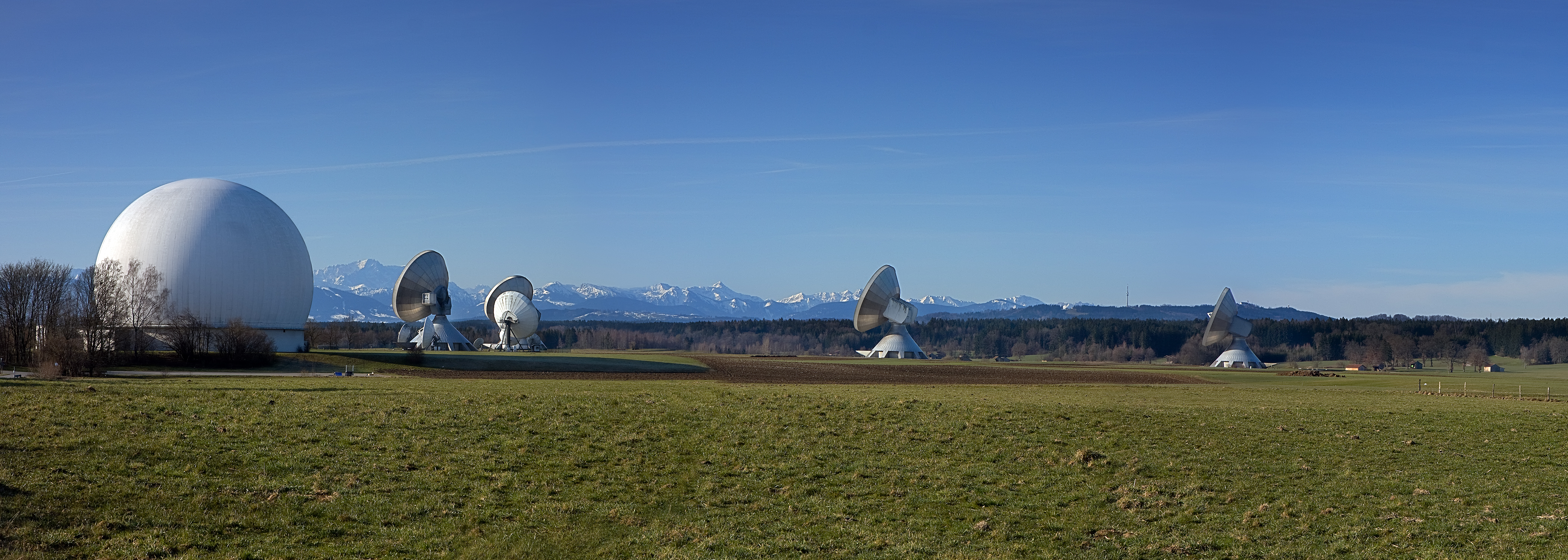
A radome (left) among multiple Cassegrain satellite antennas located at the Raisting Satellite Earth Station complex

- Clear line of sight, especially for microwave dishes
- Free of radio interference, such as marine radar
- Higher ground elevation, to maximize coverage
- Away from high-rise structures and other obstructions
- Must be at least 20 miles away from airports

== Antenna farm staff ==
- RF engineers
- Broadcast engineers
- Air conditioning engineers (to maintain the cooling systems associated with high-powered transmitters)
- Electrical engineers (for power systems)
- Maintenance, repair and operations technicians
- Telecommunications facility manager
- Security guards

== See also ==
- Antenna array
- Ham radio
- Earth station
- Echelon (signals intelligence)
