= Hollow-cathode lamp =

Types of cold cathode lamp

Basic diagram of a hollow-cathode lamp

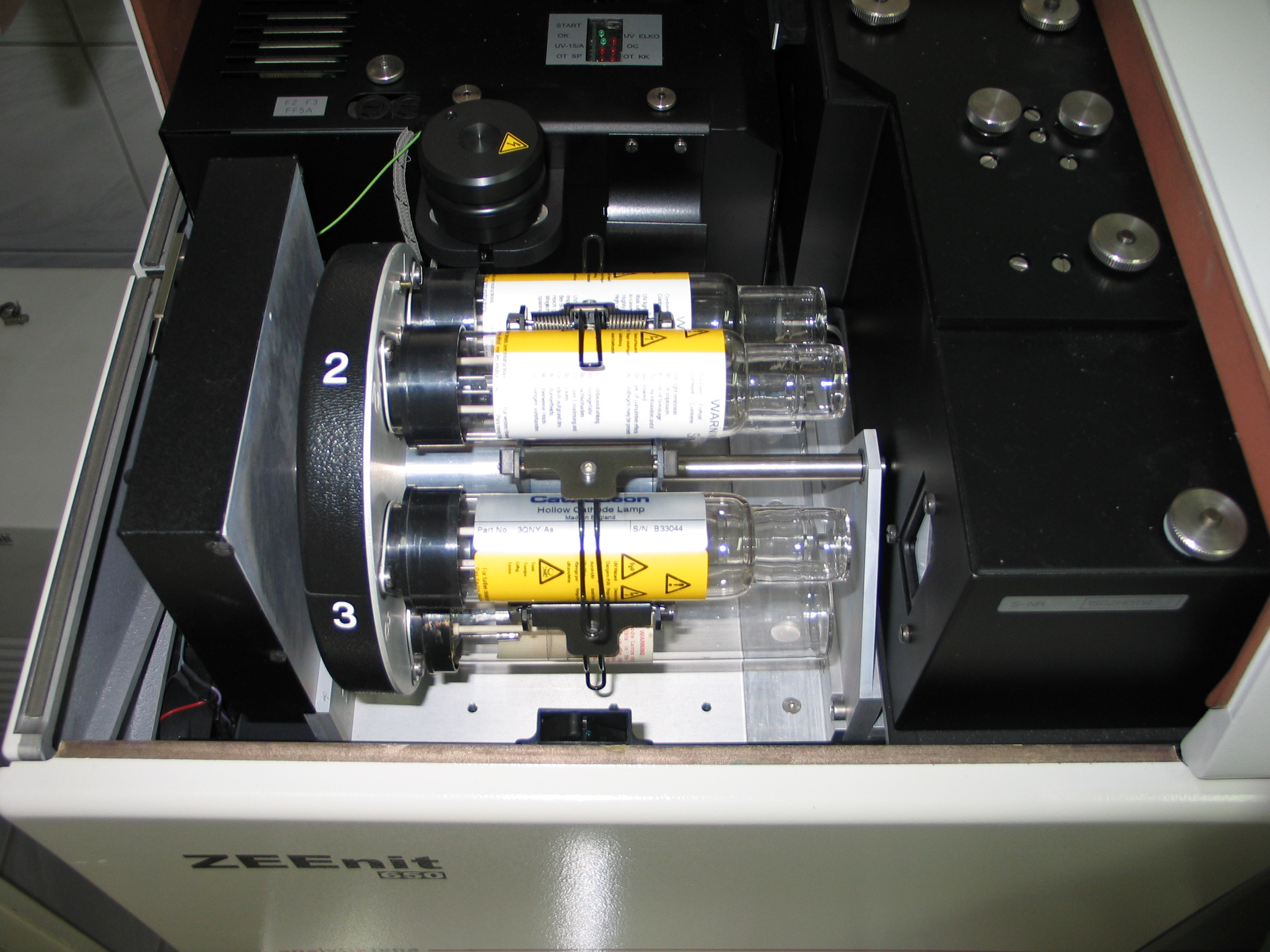
Hollow-cathode lamps from an atomic absorption spectrometer

A hollow-cathode lamp (HCL) is type of cold cathode lamp used in physics and chemistry as a spectral line source (e.g. for atomic absorption spectrometers) and as a frequency tuner for light sources such as lasers. An HCL takes advantage of the hollow cathode effect, which causes conduction at a lower voltage and with more current than a cold cathode lamp that does not have a hollow cathode.

An HCL usually consists of a glass tube containing a cathode, an anode, and a buffer gas (usually a noble gas). A large voltage across the anode and cathode will cause the buffer gas to ionize, creating a plasma. The buffer gas ions will then be accelerated into the cathode, sputtering off atoms from the cathode. Both the buffer gas and the sputtered cathode atoms will in turn be excited by collisions with other atoms/particles in the plasma. As these excited atoms decay to lower states, they will emit photons. These photons will then excite the atoms in the sample, which will release their own photons and be used to generate data.

An HCL can also be used to tune light sources to a specific atomic transition by making use of the optogalvanic effect, which is a result of direct or indirect photoionization. By shining the light source into the HCL, one can excite or even eject electrons (directly photoionize) from the atoms inside the lamp, so long as the light source includes frequencies corresponding to the right atomic transitions. Indirect photoionization can then occur when electron collisions with the excited atom eject an atomic electron.

1. $A + h \nu \rightarrow A^*$
2. $A^* + e^- \rightarrow A^+ + 2e^-$

$A$ = atom, $h \nu$ = photon, $A^*$ = atom in excited state, and $e^-$ = electron

The newly created ions cause an increase in the current across the cathode/anode and a resulting change in the voltage, which can then be measured.

To tune the light source to a specific transition frequency, a tuning parameter (often the driving current) of the light source is varied. By looking for a resonance on a data plot of the voltage signal versus source tuning parameter, the light source can be tuned to the desired frequency. This is often aided by use of a lock-in circuit.

The power supply current range is 0 to 25mA and a 600V ignition followed with 300V sustained power.

== See also ==
- List of light sources
- Electrodynamic tether § Hollow cathode
