= Laser guided and stabilized arc welding =

Laser guided and stabilized welding (LGS-welding) is a process in which a laser beam irradiates an electrical heated plasma arc to set a path of increased conductivity. Therefore, the arc's energy can be spatial directed and the plasma burns more stable. The process must be distinguished from laser-hybrid welding, since only low power laser energy of a couple hundred Watts is used and the laser does not contribute significantly to the welding process in terms of energy input.

== Operation ==
The principle of laser enhanced welding is based on the interaction between the electrical arc and laser radiation. Due to the optogalvanic effect (OGE) a channel of higher conductivity in the plasma is established along the path of the laser. Therefore, a movement of the laser beam results in a movement of the electrical arc. This effect is limited to a range of some millimeters, but shows the influence of the radiation to the plasma. A raise of welding speed of over 100% is described by using a diode laser with a wavelength of 811 nm without a significant loss in penetration depth. Furthermore, this technique is used in cladding. Depending on the welded material argon or argon with CO_{2} is used as shielding gas. The laser source must be tuned to emit at a wavelength of 811 nm and is focused into the plasma.

== Laser guided and stabilized GMA-Welding ==
The process is used for welding thin metal sheets up to about 2 mm when welding in overlap or butt joint. LGS-GMA-welding is most advantageous when welding fillet welds. The guidance effect of the laser radiation forces the arc into the fillet. Therefore, a steady seam can be reached. Furthermore, the stabilization of the plasma enables the GMA-process to weld thin sheets without burning holes in the material.

=== Equipment and setup ===
The setup requires the GMA welding head tilted at 60° to the work piece surface. In order to realize a maximum overlap between the electric arc and the laser beam in the process area, the laser is installed upright to the workpiece and focused in the electrical arc. Standard welding equipment can be used for the process. The laser source is described above.

== Laser guided and stabilized double head TIG-welding ==
In laser guided and stabilized double head TIG-welding the laser forces two arcs together. The goal of this technique is to increase the welding speed of TIG-welding without compromising the quality.

=== Equipment and setup ===
For this process two TIG-sources are needed and the laser described above. The TIG-torches are set up with the laser beam perpendicular in the middle. All welding modes of the two torches are possible (DC/DC, AC/AC, AC/DC).

== Laser guided and stabiliszed GMA-Cladding ==
In LGS-GMA-cladding the stabilization effect is used enable the GMA-process to work with low energy. This is needed to reduce the penetration depth and therefore the dilution of base and deposition material. The combination of GMA-welding and a diode laser lead to a more cost effective and energy efficient process.

=== Equipment and setup ===
The setup for the LGS-GMA-cladding is almost alike the one for LGS-GMA-welding beside that the GMA-source needs to have a "Cold-MIG" process. This means, that the welding current is controlled my microcontrollers and produced by power electronics. That way not only the current peaks can be controlled, but also the slopes.

== External links and further reading ==
- Project homepage at LZH (german)
- Project Homepage (Laser Stabilized Double TIG-welding)
- Wendelstorf, J.; Decker, I.; Wohlfahrt, H. 1994, Laser-enhanced gas tungsten arc welding (Laser-TIG), Welding in the World
- Cui, H., 1991, Untersuchungen der Wechselwirkung zwischen Schweißlichtbogen und fokussiertem Laserstrahl und der Anwendungsmöglichkeit kombinierter Laser-Lichtbogentechnik, ISSN 0344-9629. (German only)
- Paulini, J., Simon, G., 1993, A theoretical lower limit for laser power in laser-enhanced arc welding, J. Phys. D: Appl. Phys. 26 (1993) 1523-1527
- M. Schnick, S. Rose, U. Füssel, A. Mahrle, C. Demuth, E. Beyer: Numerische und experimentelle Untersuchungen zur Wechselwirkung zwischen einem Plasmalichtbogen und einem Laserstrahl geringer Leistung: DVS (German only)
- Cui, H., 1991, Untersuchungen der Wechselwirkung zwischen Schweißlichtbogen und fokussiertem Laserstrahl und der Anwendungsmöglichkeit kombinierter Laser-Lichtbogentechnik, ISSN 0344-9629. (German only)
