= MRAG =

MRAG may refer to:

- Maitland Regional Art Gallery, a public art museum in Maitland, New South Wales, Australia
- Manning Regional Art Gallery, a public art museum in Taree, New South Wales, Australia
- Marine Resource Assessment Group, a fisheries observatory
- Monica Ross Action Group, in the United Kingdom
- MRAG, the DS100 station code of Raisting station (German: Bahnhof Raisting), a railway station in the municipality of Raisting, in Bavaria, Germany
