= Inge Hecht =

German politician (1949–2019)

Member of the Landtag of Bavaria for Upper Bavaria
- In office 15 October 1994 – 5 October 2003

Member of the Weilheim-Schongau District Council
- In office c. 1980s (total of 17 years)

Member of the Raisting Municipal Council
- In office 1978 – 2007 or 2008

Personal details
- Born: 9 March 1949 Kyllburg, Rhineland-Palatinate, Allied-occupied Germany
- Died: 9 October 2019 (aged 70) Raisting, Bavaria, Germany
- Party: Social Democratic Party
- Spouse: Herr Hecht
- Children: 1

Inge Hecht (9 March 1949 – 9 October 2019) was a German trade unionist and politician who served in the Landtag of Bavaria from 1994 until 2003. A member of the Social Democratic Party, she represented the Upper Bavaria constituency. Hecht was a prominent local party organizer, and held long tenures in the Weilheim-Schongau district council and the Raisting municipal council.

== Biography ==
Inge Hecht was born on 9 March 1949 in the town of Kyllburg in the French-occupied state of Rhineland-Palatinate, though she grew up and lived in the town of Raisting in Bavaria. After completing her compulsory education (Volksschule) in 1963, she began vocational training as a retail salesperson. She also worked as an office clerk, and was a member of the IG Bauen-Agrar-Umwelt trade union and the Friends of Nature. Hecht was Catholic, and was married with one child.

Hecht's political involvement began in 1976 when she joined the Social Democratic Party (SPD). The following year, she founded the local branch of the Workers' Welfare Association (AWO), chairing it until 2006. She later became the deputy chair of the AWO in Upper Bavaria. In 1978, she was elected to the Raisting municipal council, serving for 29 years. She also served for 17 years on the Weilheim-Schongau district council, including 13 years as the SPD's council spokesperson. From 1978 until 1999, Hecht was the chair of the district SPD association and the district SPD's women's group.

Hecht was elected to the Landtag of Bavaria in the 1994 election, representing the Upper Bavaria constituency. She was re-elected in the 1998 election, and served until the end of her term in 2003. Hecht was a member of the Committee on State Budget and Financial Affairs during both terms. Additionally, she was a member of the Committee on Food, Agriculture and Forestry in her first term and the special Interim Committee (Zwischenausschuss) in the last months of her second term. While in the state parliament, Hecht was also the SPD parliamentary group's consumer policy spokesperson.

Hecht conducted her most notable political campaign in 1996 when she ran for Weilheim-Schongau district administrator. After making the run-off election, Hecht narrowly lost to Luitpold Braun of the Christian Social Union in the historically conservative district, and is considered by the SPD to be a precursor to its later success in the district. On 11 January 2015, the Weilheim-Schongau SPD awarded her the Willy Brandt Medal for her services to the party.

In her later life, Hecht was minimally active in politics due to a stroke which left her disabled. She died on 9 October 2019 in Raisting.
