= ESMO =

ESMO may refer to:

- European Society for Medical Oncology
- European Student Moon Orbiter
- Oskarshamn Airport (ICAO code)
