= Laser-hybrid welding =

Laser-hybrid welding is a type of welding process that combines the principles of laser beam welding and arc welding.

The combination of laser light and an electrical arc into an amalgamated welding process has existed since the 1970s, but has only recently been used in industrial applications. There are three main types of hybrid welding process, depending on the arc used: TIG, plasma arc or MIG augmented laser welding. While TIG-augmented laser welding was the first to be researched, MIG is the first to go into industry and is commonly known as hybrid laser welding.

Whereas in the early days laser sources still had to prove their suitability for industrial use, today they are standard equipment in many manufacturing enterprises. The combination of laser welding with another weld process is called a "hybrid welding process". This means that a laser beam and an electrical arc act simultaneously in one welding zone, influencing and supporting each other.

== Laser ==
Laser welding not only requires high laser power but also a high quality beam to obtain the desired "deep-weld effect". The resulting higher quality of beam can be exploited either to obtain a smaller focus diameter or a larger focal distance. A variety of laser types are used for this process, in particular Nd:YAG where the laser light can be transmitted via a water-cooled glass fiber. The beam is projected onto the workpiece by collimating and focusing optics. Carbon dioxide laser can also be used where the beam is transmitted via lens or mirrors.

== Laser-hybrid process ==
For welding metallic objects, the laser beam is focused to obtain intensities of more than 1 MW/cm^{2}. When the laser beam hits the surface of the material, this spot is heated up to vaporization temperature, and a vapor cavity is formed in the weld metal due to the escaping metal vapor. This is known as a keyhole. The extraordinary feature of the weld seam is its high depth-to-width ratio. The energy-flow density of the freely burning arc is slightly more than 100 kW/cm^{2}. Unlike a dual process where two separate weld processes act in succession, hybrid welding may be viewed as a combination of both weld processes acting simultaneously in one and the same process zone. Depending on the kind of arc or laser process used, and depending on the process parameters, the two systems will influence each other in different ways.

The combination of the laser process and the arc process results in an increase in both weld penetration depth and welding speed (as compared to each process alone). The metal vapor escaping from the vapor cavity acts upon the arc plasma. Absorption of the laser radiation in the processing plasma remains negligible. Depending on the ratio of the two power inputs, the character of the overall process may be mainly determined either by the laser or by the arc.

Absorption of the laser radiation is substantially influenced by the temperature of the workpiece surface. Before the laser welding process can start, the initial reflectance must be overcome, especially on aluminum surfaces. This can be achieved by preheating the material. In the hybrid process, the arc heats the metal, helping the laser beam to couple in. After the vaporisation temperature has been reached, the vapor cavity is formed, and nearly all radiation energy can be put into the workpiece. The energy required for this is thus determined by the temperature-dependent absorption and by the amount of energy lost by conduction into the rest of the workpiece. In laser-hybrid welding, using MIG, vaporisation takes place not only from the surface of the workpiece but also from the filler wire, so that more metal vapor is available to facilitate the absorption of the laser radiation.

== Fatigue behavior ==
Over the years a great deal of research has been done to understand fatigue behavior, particularly for new techniques like laser-hybrid welding, but knowledge is still limited. Laser-hybrid welding is an advanced welding technology that creates narrow deep welds and offers greater freedom to control the weld surface geometry. Therefore, fatigue analysis and life prediction of hybrid weld joints has become more important and is the subject of ongoing research.

== See also ==
- Laser guided and stabilized arc welding
- List of laser articles
