= European Student Moon Orbiter =

Proposed European student mission to the Moon

The European Student Moon Orbiter (ESMO) was a proposed European student mission to the Moon. Student teams from 19 universities throughout Europe worked on the program. ESMO was conceived by the Student Space Exploration & Technology Initiative (SSETI) under the support of the European Space Agency (ESA); prior to the start of Phase A the full responsibility for the management of the program was transferred to the ESA Education Office.

In 2009, Surrey Satellite Technology Ltd (SSTL) was selected as prime contractor. In April 2012, ESMO was scheduled for launch in 2014 or 2015, but further ESA evaluation deemed the ESMO project's costs "unsustainable" given the ESA Education Office's budget.

== Objectives ==
The mission objectives for ESMO were:

- To launch the first lunar spacecraft to be designed, built and operated by students across ESA Member States and ESA Cooperating States
- To place and operate the spacecraft in a lunar orbit
- To acquire images of the Moon from a stable lunar orbit and transmit them back to Earth for education outreach purposes
- To perform new measurements relevant to advanced technology demonstration, lunar science and exploration

The educational aim of the project was to provide valuable hands-on experience to university students within a real space project. This is in order to fully prepare a qualified workforce for future ESA missions.

== Lunar transfer ==
The spacecraft of approximately 190 kg (420 lb) mass and a size of 76 × 74 × 74 cm (30 × 29 × 29 in) was designed to be launched as a secondary or auxiliary payload into Geostationary transfer orbit (GTO) in 2014/2015. From there, the spacecraft would use its on-board propulsion to travel to lunar orbit via a weak stability boundary transfer. This travel via the Sun-Earth L1 Lagrange point would take three months, but it requires much less propellant than a direct transfer (see Low energy transfer and Interplanetary Transport Network). ESMO is intended to be operated in lunar orbit for six months.

== Payloads ==
Payloads that were considered for the orbiter included:

- Narrow Angle Camera (outreach payload): to take images of the lunar surface. High school students would have been able to propose a lunar site to be imaged.
- LunaNet (technology demonstration payload): internet-like network at the Moon for communication between future spacecraft in lunar orbit, landers, rovers and ground stations on the Earth. The LunaNet experiment would have tested the associated communication protocols for the Lunar Internet.
- Radiation Monitor (scientific payload): a compact and low power radiation monitor which could have provided inputs for space environment models.
- Radar (scientific payload): to provide radar observations of the Moon (radar observations from Earth are limited to the Earth-facing side of the Moon).
- Microwave Radiometric Sounder (scientific payload): a passive microwave radiometer to measure thermal and dielectric properties of the lunar regolith.

== Technical facts ==
The table below provides an overview of the planned spacecraft platform and the ground segment.

Subsystem	Description
Attitude Determination and Control System (ADCS)	3-axis stabilized: 2 star trackers, 4 Sun sensors, 2 inertial measurement units, 4 reaction wheels, 8 cold gas thrusters
On-board Data Handling	2 ESA LEON2 processors (dual redundant) running data handling software (command timeline and simple FDIR) and ADCS software; 32 MB Serial Flash for payload data storage; CANbus data interfaces
Communications	Low Gain Antennas for omni-directional coverage; S-band transponder with PSK-PM modulation and range and range rate capability for radio-navigation; 8 kbit/s downlink / 4 kbit/s uplink between Moon and Earth stations
Power	Body-mounted 3J GaAs solar cells for 170 W beginning of life power and 122 W end of life power; 24-29 V unregulated bus; 1800 Wh capacity Li-ion batteries
Propulsion	4 liquid MON/MMH bipropellant thrusters: 22 N thrust each, 285 s specific impulse (modulated by AOCS software during burns for reaction control)
Structure	CFRP/Al honeycomb construction box with load bearing central thrust tube
Thermal Control	Passive: MLI and surface coatings; active: local heaters for eclipse (e.g. propellant tanks)
Ground Segment	Ground stations: 25m S-band dish in Raisting and 15m S-band dish in Villafranca; Perth/Kourou for launch and early orbit phase and manoeuvres

== Participating teams ==
Twenty-one teams from 19 European universities in ESA member states and cooperating states were part of the project.

University	Country	Responsibilities
University of Liège	Belgium	Narrow Angle Camera Payload
Czech Technical University in Prague	Czech Republic	AOCS Interface Module
University of Tartu	Estonia	Assembly, Integration and Verification and Satellite Operation
Supaero	France	Star Tracker
University of Stuttgart	Germany	Propulsion System - Gas Feed (Cold Gas Thruster)
Technical University of Munich	Germany	LunaNet Payload & Ground Station
University of L'Aquila and University of Rome La Sapienza	Italy	Microwave Radiometer Scientific Payload
Politecnico di Milano	Italy	Attitude Determination and Control System
Politecnico di Milano	Italy	Propulsion System - Liquid Feed (Bipropellant Thruster)
Warsaw University of Technology	Poland	Thermal Control Subsystem
Wroclaw University of Technology	Poland	Communications System
AGH University of Science and Technology	Poland	Space Environment & Effects Analysis
Politehnica University of Bucharest	Romania	Attitude Determination and Control System
Politehnica University of Bucharest	Romania	Structure
University of Bucharest	Romania	Radiation Monitor Payload
University of Ljubljana	Slovenia	Simulator
University of Ljubljana	Slovenia	Radar Payload
University of Maribor	Slovenia	On-board Data Handling
University of Oviedo	Spain	Harness
University of Vigo	Spain	GS/OPS-V team. Ground Station VIL-1 team.
University of Glasgow	United Kingdom	Mission Analysis and Flight Dynamics
University of Southampton	United Kingdom	System Engineering
University of Warwick	United Kingdom	Power Subsystem

Led by ESA's Education Office at ESTEC, the project successfully completed a Phase A feasibility study and continued with the preliminary design during Phase B. More than 200 students were involved in Phases A and B of the ESMO project. Since November 2009, SSTL coordinated and supervised the work of the students, providing system-level and specialist technical support. Regular workshops at ESTEC and ESOC as well as internships at SSTL were organized to support the student teams in their ESMO related activities and provide training / knowledge transfer. Additionally, facilities at SSTL were to be utilized for spacecraft assembly, integration and testing. As a major milestone during Phase B, the System Requirements Review (SRR) for ESMO was performed in 2010. At SRR, the system requirements and system design were finalized. Part of the SRR also selected the university teams to participate in the following phases of the project. After passing a preliminary design review in March 2012, the program was ended as a result of budget constraints in April 2012. ESMO was to have been the fourth mission within ESA's Education Satellite Programme following SSETI Express, YES2 and the European Student Earth Orbiter (ESEO).
