= Raisting station =

Railway station in Bavaria

Raisting
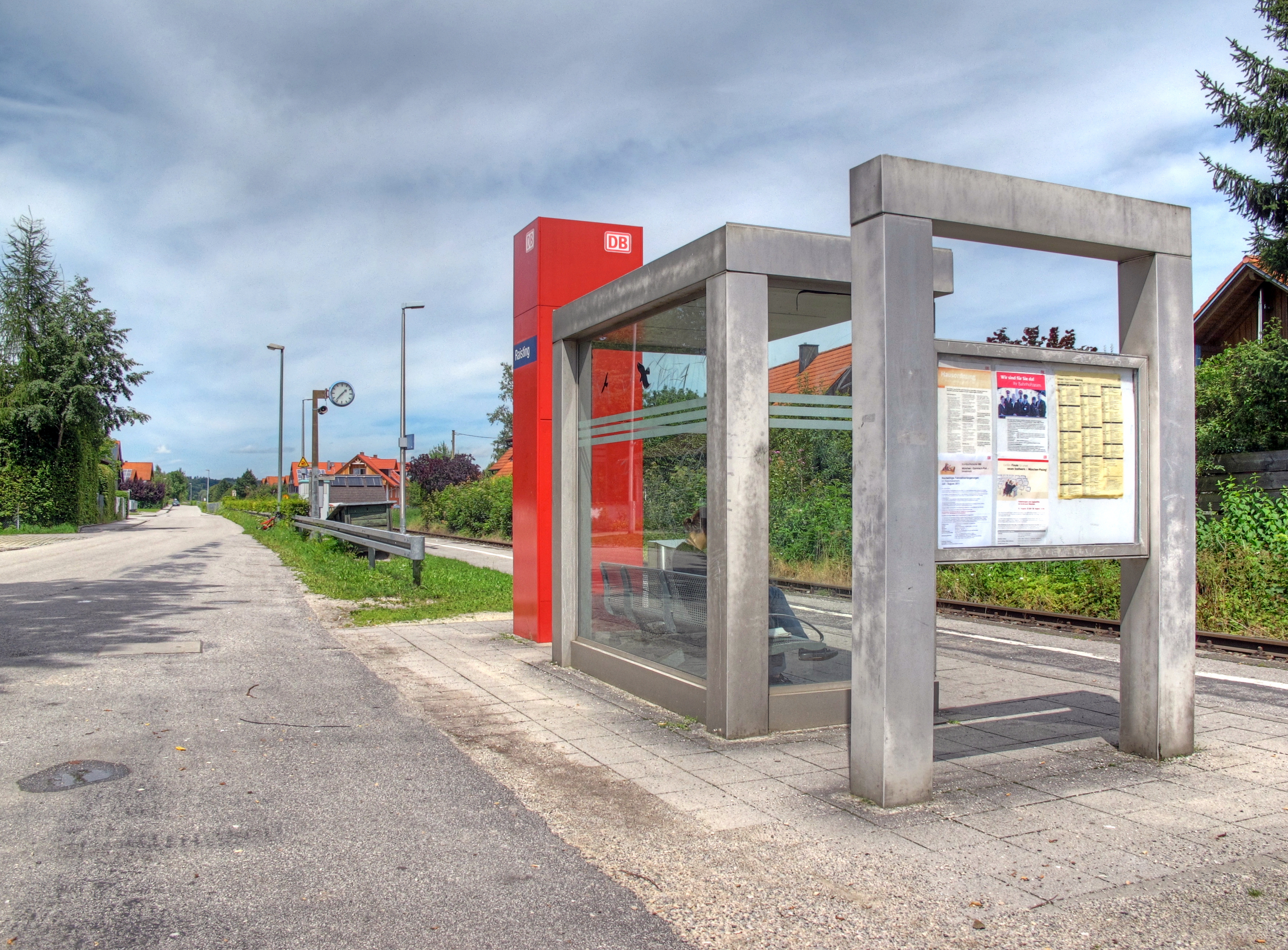
- The station platform in 2011

General information
- Location: Raisting, Bavaria; Germany
- Coordinates: 47°54′44″N 11°06′51″E
- Owner: DB Netz
- Operator: DB Station&Service
- Lines: Mering–Weilheim line (KBS 985)
- Distance: 45.9 km (28.5 mi) from Mering
- Platforms: 1 side platform
- Tracks: 1
- Train operators: Bayerische Regiobahn
- Connections: Regionalverkehr Oberbayern buses

Other information
- Station code: 5104
- DS100 code: MRAG
- IBNR: 8004925
- Category: 6

Services
Preceding station		Following station
Dießen towards Augsburg-Oberhausen	RB 67	Weilheim (Oberbay) towards Schongau
Location

Raisting station (German: Bahnhof Raisting) is a railway station in the municipality of Raisting, in Bavaria, Germany. It is located on the Mering–Weilheim line of Deutsche Bahn.

== Services ==
As of the December 2021 timetable change, the following services stop at Raisting:

- RB: hourly service between Augsburg-Oberhausen and Weilheim (Oberbay); some trains continue from Weilheim to Schongau.
