= Raisting Earth Station =

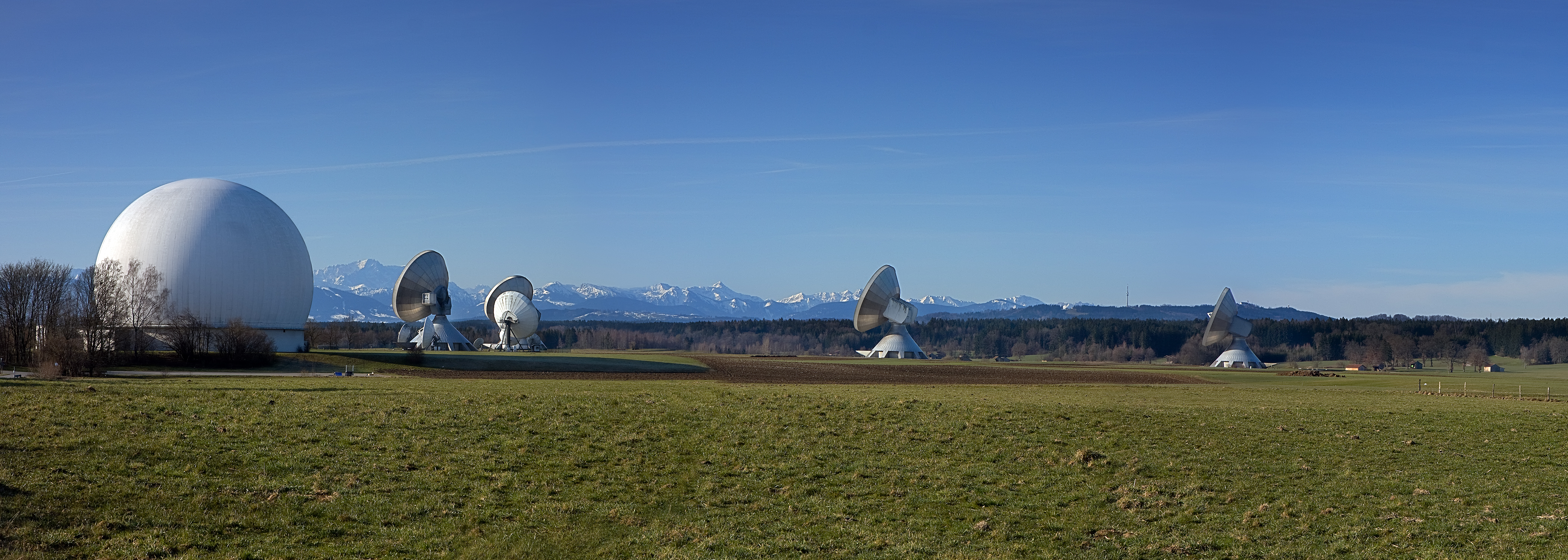
- Raisting Earth Station
- Location: Raisting, Bavaria
- Coordinates: 47°54′0″N 11°6′46″E
- Altitude: 549 m (1,801 ft)
- Established: 1963
- Website: www.erdfunkstelle-radom.de
- Telescopes: Radom Raisting
- Related media on Commons

Raisting Earth Station (German: Erdfunkstelle Raisting) is a satellite ground station near Raisting, Bavaria. The station was Germany's first commercial station for satellite communication and is still one of the largest ground stations in the world.

== History ==
After examining many potential sites, the Deutsche Bundespost began construction of the first civil satellite ground station in Germany in 1963. Its construction allowed for satellite communications between Europe and North America for the first time. It was used to transmit, among other things, the Apollo 11 Moon Landing and the 1972 Munich Olympics.

More recently the station was to have been used as a ground station for the European Student Moon Orbiter before the mission's cancellation.

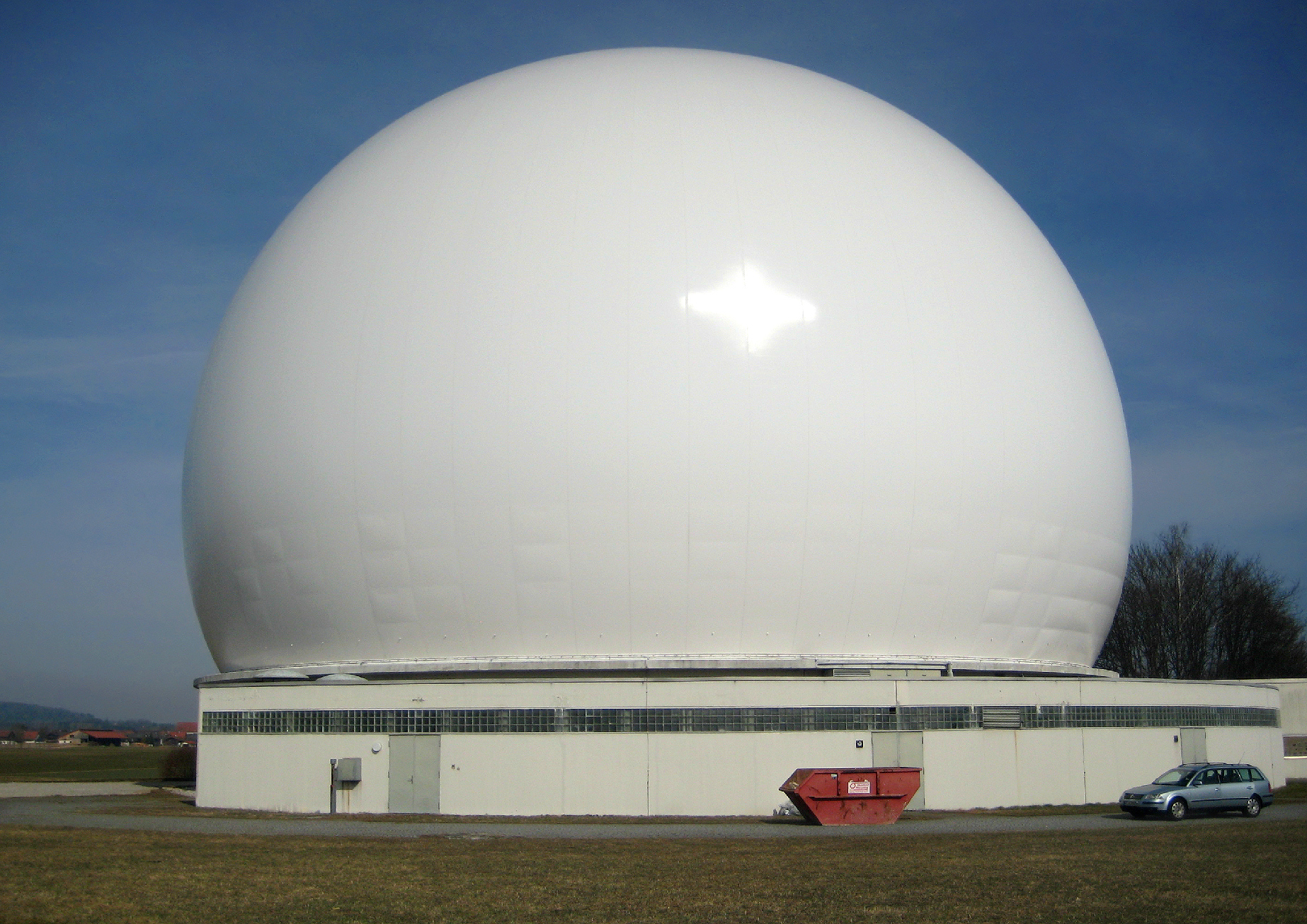
The main radome in 2011.

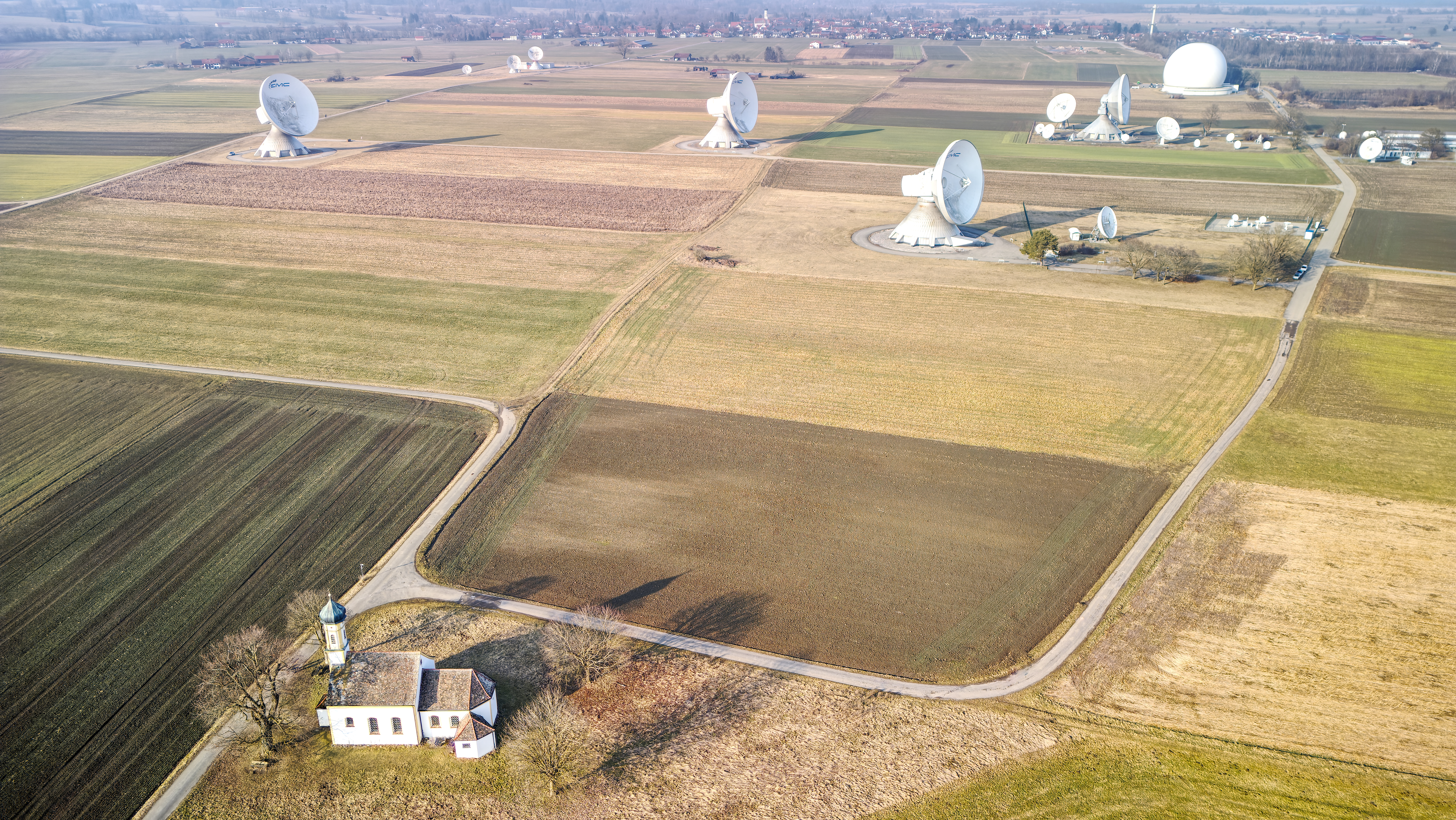
Drone Overview in 2025.

== Operations ==
Deutsche Telekom operated the station from its construction until 2005 when it was then sold to US-based EMC. In 2016, EMC was then purchased by Anuvu who operate portions of the station today.

Today the radome has been preserved as an industrial monument commemorating the dawn of satellite communications. The radome and station are available for public tour.
