= Optogalvanic effect =

The Optogalvanic effect is the change in the conductivity of a gas discharge induced by a light source (typically a laser). This effect has found many applications in atomic spectroscopy and laser stabilization.

== Introduction ==
In general, neutral atoms/molecules are generated in a gas discharge, and some of these neutral particles will be subsequently ionized, thereby creating a plasma. Incoming light will excite electronic transitions if the energy difference between pairs of atomic/molecular levels is in resonance with a frequency component of this light. Now, the probability and the cross-section to ionize one neutral particle depends on its initial energetic state. This means that light can change the rate at which neutral particles are ionised. Since the medium contains charged particles, it is not surprising that also the electrical properties of the gas discharge can change.
