= Hollow cathode effect =

The hollow cathode effect allows electrical conduction at a lower voltage or with more current in a cold-cathode gas-discharge lamp when the cathode is a conductive tube open at one end than a similar lamp with a flat cathode. The hollow cathode effect was recognized by Friedrich Paschen in 1916.

In a hollow cathode, the electron emitting surface is in the inside of the tube. Several processes contribute to enhanced performance of a hollow cathode:

- The pendulum effect, where an electron oscillates back and forth in the tube, creating secondary electrons along the way
- The photoionization effect, where photons emitted in the tube cause further ionization
- Stepwise ionization
- Sputtering

The hollow cathode effect is utilized in the electrodes for neon signs, in hollow-cathode lamps, and more.
