= Raisting =

- Municipality
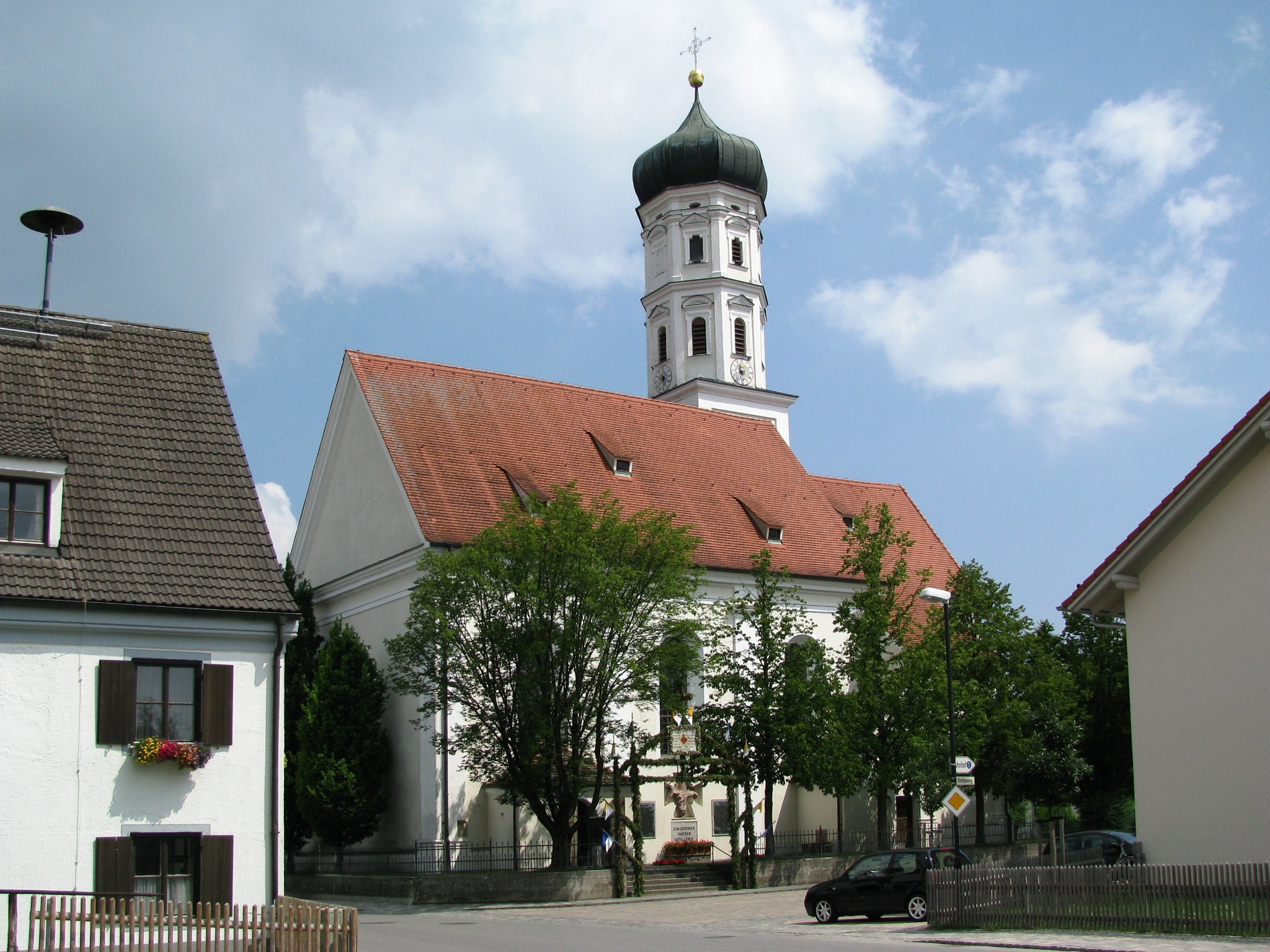
- Saint Remigius parish church

- Coat of arms

- Location of Raisting within Weilheim-Schongau district
- Interactive map of Raisting
- Location within Germany Location within Bavaria
- Coordinates: 47°55′N 11°6′E
- Country: Germany
- State: Bavaria
- Admin. region: Oberbayern
- District: Weilheim-Schongau

Government
  - Mayor (2020–26): Martin Höck

Area
  - Total: 21.98 km^{2} (8.49 sq mi)
- Elevation: 553 m (1,814 ft)

Population (2025-12-31)
  - Total: 2,374
  - Density: 108.0/km^{2} (279.7/sq mi)
- Time zone: UTC+01:00 (CET)
  - Summer (DST): UTC+02:00 (CEST)
- Postal codes: 82399
- Dialling codes: 08807
- Vehicle registration: WM
- Website: www.raisting.de

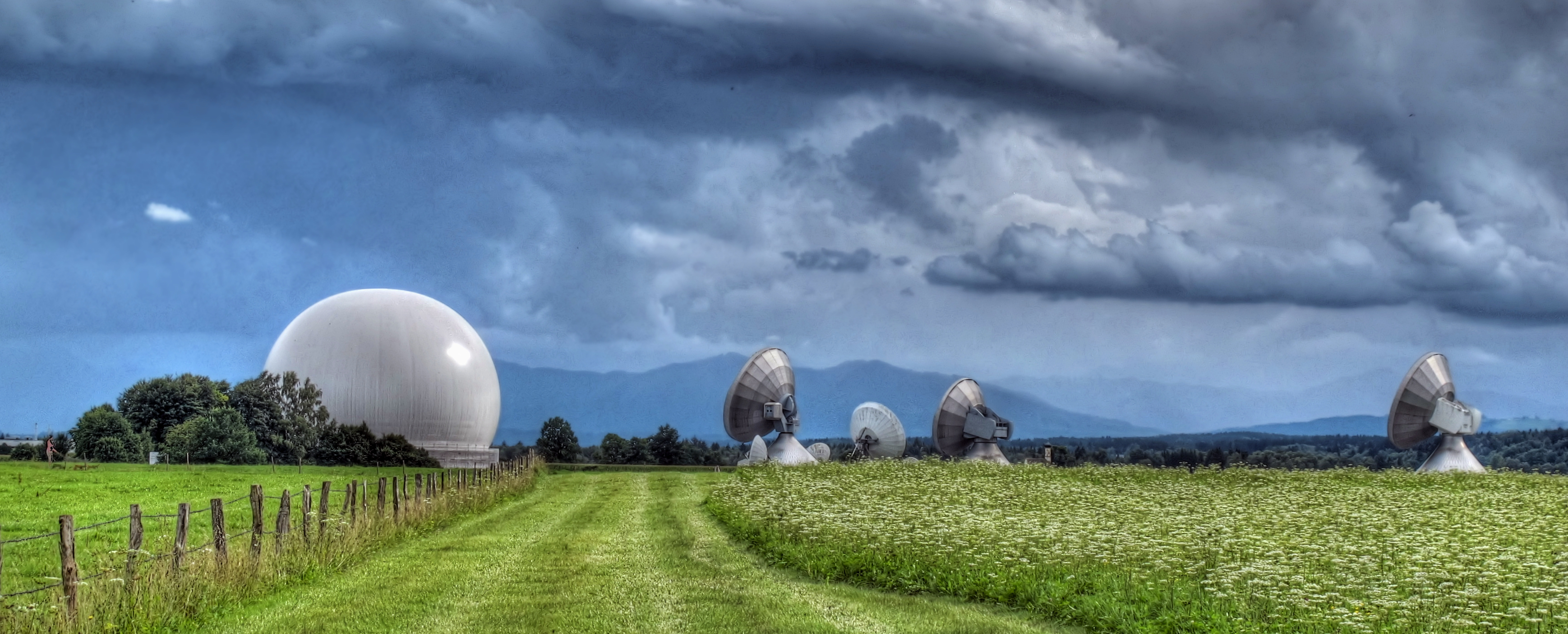
Parabolic antennas of the radio telescope station at Raisting

Raisting (German pronunciation: [ˈʁaɪstɪŋ]) is a municipality in the Weilheim-Schongau district, in Bavaria, Germany.

== Sport ==
The towns association football club SV Raisting, formed in 1924, experienced its greatest success in 2013 when it won promotion to the southern division of the Bayernliga for the first time.

== Science ==
The town is home to Germany's first satellite ground station, Raisting Earth Station.

== Transport ==
The town has a railway station, Raisting, on the Mering–Weilheim line.
