= Young Engineers' Satellite 2 =

Student-built tether satellite

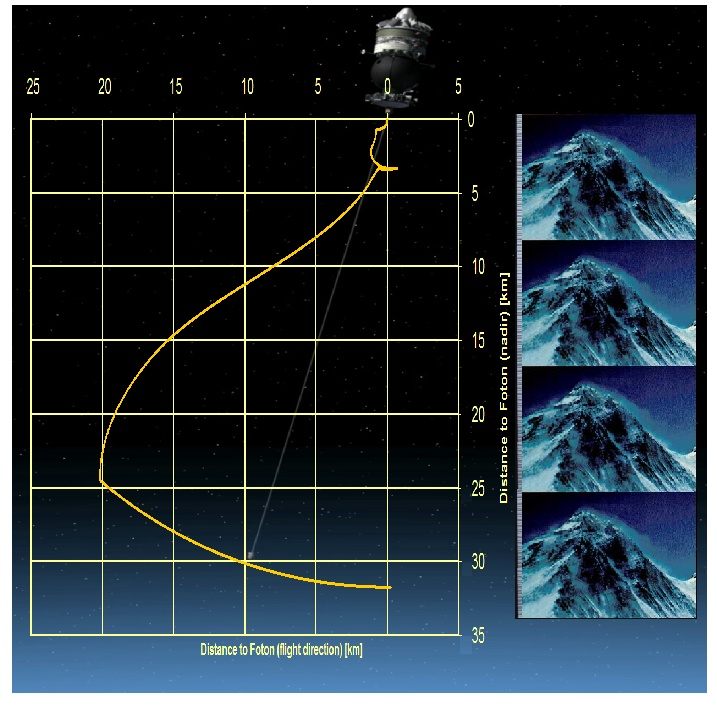
The reconstructed deployment of the YES2 tether, i.e., the trajectory of the Fotino capsule in relationship to the Foton spacecraft. Orbital motion is to the left. The Earth is down. Mount Everest is shown several times for scale. The Fotino was released at the vertical, 32 km below Foton, about 240 km above the surface of the Earth, and made a re-entry towards Kazakhstan.

The Young Engineers' Satellite 2 (YES2) was a 36 kg student-built tether satellite that was part of ESA's Foton-M3 microgravity mission. The launch of the Russian Foton-M3 occurred on September 14, 2007, at 13:00 (CEST) by a Soyuz-U launcher lifting off from the Baikonur Cosmodrome in Kazakhstan. Foton-M3 returned successfully to Earth on 26 September 2007, landing in Kazakhstan at 7:58 GMT. The YES2 project was carried out by Delta-Utec SRC and supervised by the ESA Education Office and was nearly entirely designed and built by students and young engineers.

== History ==
The YES2 deployment took place Sept. 25, 2007. The mission objective was to deploy a 30 km long and 0.5 mm thin tether (made of Dyneema) in two controlled stages, in order to release a small, spherical, lightweight reentry capsule called Fotino into a predetermined trajectory to a landing area in Kazakhstan.

The scientific objectives of the mission were achieved. The YES2 featured the first multi-stage tether deployment. It could be reconstructed within about 20 m accuracy for the first stage (3400 m) and 100–150 m for the 31.7 km deployment as a whole. The first stage was deployed accurately (about 10–20 m error), the second stage overdeployed by 1.7 km. Fotino released as planned during a swing of the tethered system through the vertical (as seen from Foton). The tether properties, deployment dynamics and tether deployer system performance could be evaluated. The tether deployer performed nominally. However, due to an electrical fault, the on-board computer failed to register the final length correctly and only a partial deployment was initially reported based on telemetry available in real-time. Initial deployment friction was found to exceed the nominal range, revealed by post-mission testing to be most likely due to a thermomechanical settling of the tether spool. Some weeks after mission completion, analysis of the full data set confirmed that the tether deployed to its full length of 31.7 km.

No signal was ever received from the "Fotino" re-entry capsule after separation, and it was lost. YES2 established a new world record as the longest artificial structure in space and was later included in the Guinness Book of Records Edition 2009.

== The YES2 project ==
Most of the work done in this ambitious project (like design, manufacturing and integration) was done by students and young engineers. In total some 450 students participated.

Soon after the beginning of the project, four "Centres of Expertise" were created. These were universities which were responsible for parts of the satellite or subsystems. The centres were: Samara State Aerospace University, Russia (mission analysis, GPS); University of Modena and Reggio Emilia, Italy (re-entry capsule); Hochschule Niederrhein in Krefeld, Germany (tether); University of Patras, Greece (mechanical and thermal). Coordination and system engineering was carried out by prime contractor Delta-Utec SRC from the Netherlands.

Towards the end of the project, in the manufacturing and integration phase, the work concentrated on the Delta-Utec office in Leiden and ESA's ESTEC in Noordwijk, where the satellite was built and tested.

The test program included:

- electromagnetic compatibility testing in the "Maxwell" EMC test chamber
- simulation of space environment in a thermal vacuum chamber
- vibration testing on a shake table
- functional tests of all components and sub-systems

The satellite was handed over to ESA at the beginning of May 2007 and was shipped to Samara (Russia) soon after, where YES2 was mated to Foton-M3 for the first time for test purposes. Afterwards, YES2 and Foton were separated again and brought to Baikonur (Kazakhstan) by train where the whole satellite was completely integrated and mated with the launcher, a Soyuz-U rocket. Foton-M3 and YES2 finally launched on 14 September 2007 at 13:00 (CEST) from the Gagarin launch pad at Baikonur Cosmodrome.

The main contribution of the project was the demonstration of a complex controlled deployment in two stages. Post-flight, several independent sources of deployment data were collected, including deployment length and rate measurements from YES2 itself as well as highly precise triaxial accelerometer data from a separate experiment on the Foton carrier spacecraft. These data confirmed that the deployment did progress mostly successfully, in particular the critical first stage and stage transition and the tether deployer performed nominally. The data that was recovered helped to understand the deployer performance and tether dynamics in yet unseen detail, including explicit signatures of sound waves, transverse waves and spring-mass motion. The small reentry capsule Fotino, intended to demonstrate the SpaceMail concept, was not successfully recovered. Calculations based on YES2 sensor data indicate that the landing site should have been in or near the Aral Sea. Alternatively, the capsule, experimental in itself, may have burnt up or crashlanded.

== Design of the satellite ==
There were three main components of the experiment:

- FLOYD – the YES2 deployment mechanism located on the Foton spacecraft;
- MASS – the Mechanical data Acquisition and Support System;
- FOTINO – a small spherical capsule, with a diameter of 40 cm and a mass of 6 kg.

== YES2 mission design ==
During the flight, the FLOYD mechanism ejected the other two components. There was then to be a controlled deployment of a 30 km long tether. Orbital dynamics caused the Fotino capsule to be positioned in front of the mother spacecraft. By bringing the deployment to a halt, a pendulum-like swing was induced. When the capsule and tether swung through the local vertical, the tether was cut. Since the capsule was then going too slowly to stay in orbit, it entered a trajectory to re-enter the atmosphere from an altitude of about 250 km, protected by a heat shield made of novel materials. Once it reached an altitude of 5 km, a parachute was intended to deploy to ensure a soft landing on the steppes of Kazakhstan.

Since data from the Fotino was not downlinked and the Fotino capsule itself was not recovered, it is not known how well the capsule survived the entry.

== See also ==
- Space tether
