= Dießen station =

Railway station in Bavaria

Dießen
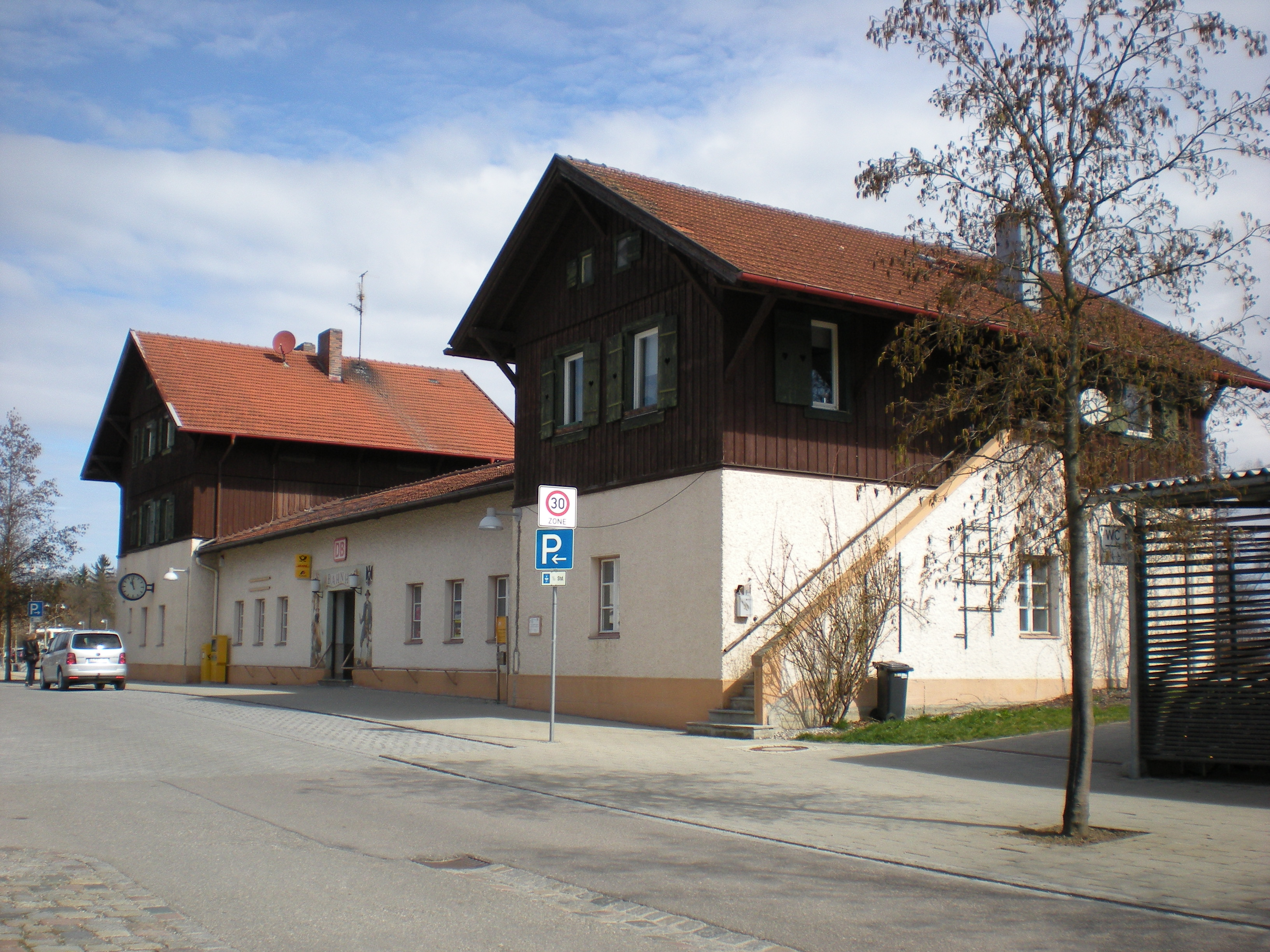
- The station building in 2013

General information
- Location: Dießen am Ammersee, Bavaria; Germany
- Coordinates: 47°57′03″N 11°06′27″E
- Owner: DB Netz
- Operator: DB Station&Service
- Lines: Mering–Weilheim line (KBS 985)
- Distance: 41.5 km (25.8 mi) from Mering
- Platforms: 2 side platforms
- Tracks: 2
- Train operators: Bayerische Regiobahn
- Connections: Regionalverkehr Oberbayern buses; Bayerische Seenschifffahrt ferries

Other information
- Station code: 1205
- DS100 code: MDIN
- IBNR: 8001447
- Category: 6

Services
Preceding station		Following station
St. Alban towards Augsburg-Oberhausen	RB 67	Raisting towards Schongau
Location

Dießen station (German: Bahnhof Dießen) is a railway station in the municipality of Dießen am Ammersee, in Bavaria, Germany. It is located on the Mering–Weilheim line of Deutsche Bahn.

== Services ==
As of the December 2021 timetable change, the following services stop at Dießen:

- RB: hourly service between Augsburg-Oberhausen and Weilheim (Oberbay); some trains continue from Weilheim to Schongau.
