= Utting station =

Railway station in Bavaria

Utting
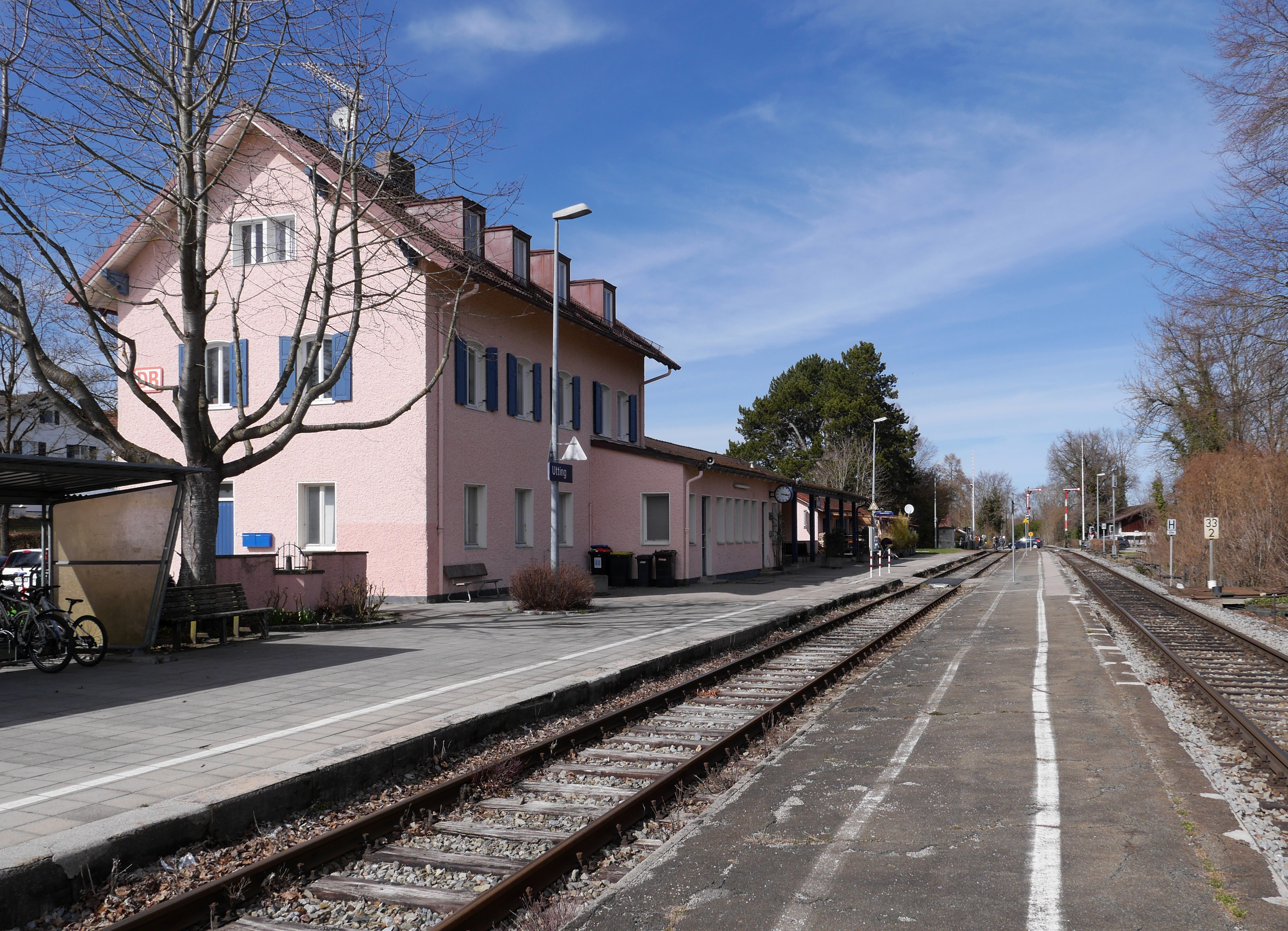
- The station in 2018

General information
- Location: Utting am Ammersee, Bavaria; Germany
- Coordinates: 48°01′22″N 11°05′38″E
- Owner: DB Netz
- Operator: DB Station&Service
- Lines: Mering–Weilheim line (KBS 985)
- Distance: 33.2 km (20.6 mi) from Mering
- Platforms: 1 island platform; 1 side platform
- Tracks: 2
- Train operators: Bayerische Regiobahn
- Connections: Landsberger Verkehrsgemeinschaft buses

Other information
- Station code: 6382
- DS100 code: MUTG
- IBNR: 8006048
- Category: 6

Services
Preceding station		Following station
Schondorf (Bay) towards Augsburg-Oberhausen	RB 67	Riederau towards Schongau
Location

Utting station (German: Bahnhof Utting) is a railway station in the municipality of Utting am Ammersee, in Bavaria, Germany. It is located on the Mering–Weilheim line of Deutsche Bahn.

== Services ==
As of the December 2021 timetable change, the following services stop at Utting:

- RB: hourly service between Augsburg-Oberhausen and Weilheim (Oberbay); some trains continue from Weilheim to Schongau.
