= St. Ottilien station =

Railway station in Bavaria

St. Ottilien
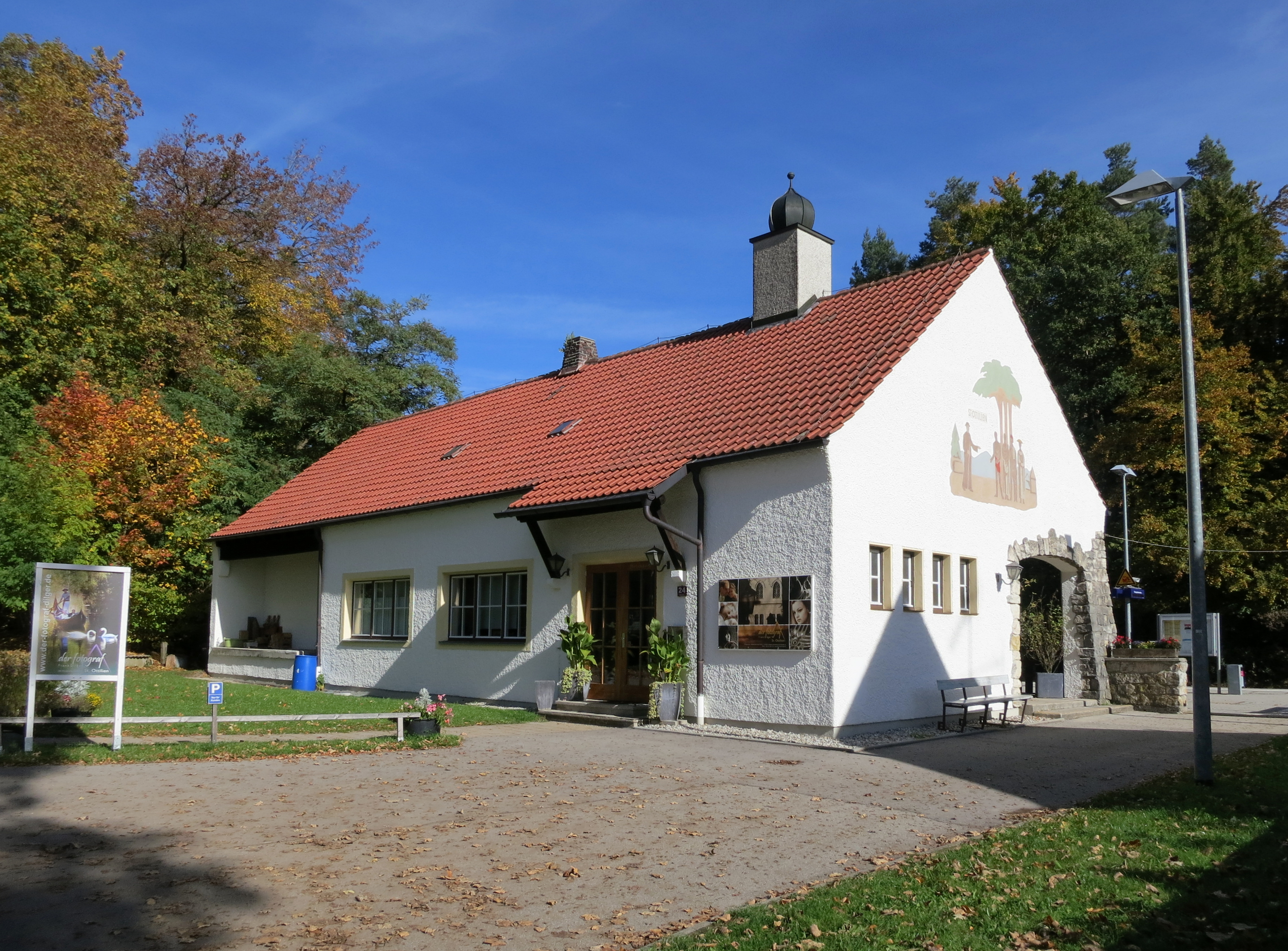
- The station in 2013

General information
- Location: Eresing, Bavaria; Germany
- Coordinates: 48°05′40″N 11°02′54″E
- Owner: DB Netz
- Operator: DB Station&Service
- Lines: Mering–Weilheim line (KBS 985)
- Distance: 23.1 km (14.4 mi) from Mering
- Platforms: 1 side platform
- Tracks: 1
- Train operators: Bayerische Regiobahn
- Connections: Landsberger Verkehrsgemeinschaft buses

Other information
- Station code: 5946
- DS100 code: MOTN
- IBNR: 8005656
- Category: 6

Services
Preceding station		Following station
Geltendorf towards Augsburg-Oberhausen	RB 67	Schondorf (Bay) towards Schongau
Location

St. Ottilien station (German: Haltestelle St. Ottilien) is a railway station in the municipality of Eresing, in Bavaria, Germany. It is located on the Mering–Weilheim line of Deutsche Bahn. The station takes its name from the nearby St. Ottilien Archabbey.

== Services ==
As of the December 2021 timetable change, the following services stop at St. Ottilien:

- RB: hourly service between Augsburg-Oberhausen and Weilheim (Oberbay); some trains continue from Weilheim to Schongau.
