= St. Alban station =

Railway station in Bavaria

St. Alban
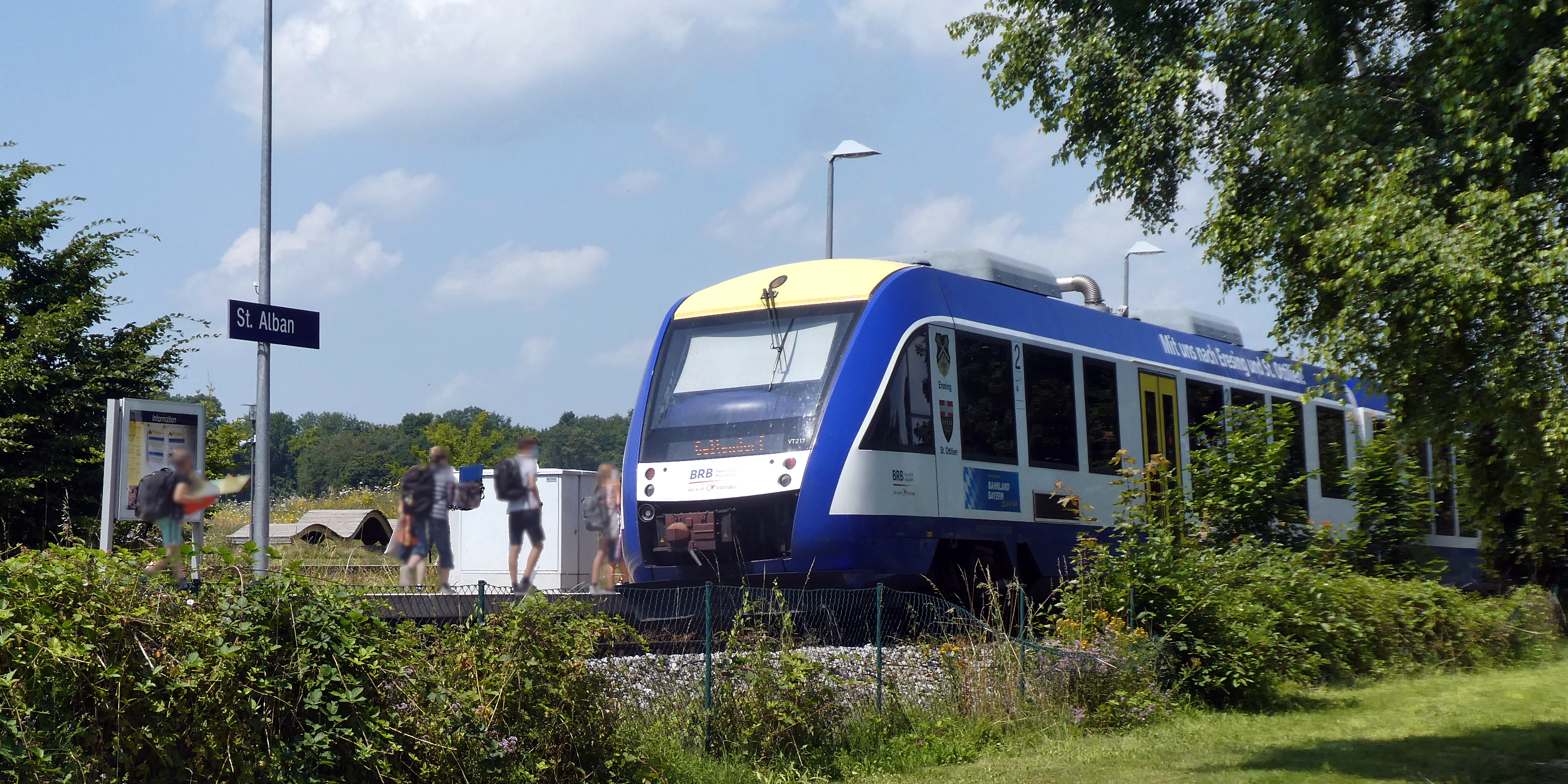
- A train at the station in 2021

General information
- Location: Dießen am Ammersee, Bavaria; Germany
- Coordinates: 47°57′51″N 11°06′19″E
- Owner: DB Netz
- Operator: DB Station&Service
- Lines: Mering–Weilheim line (KBS 985)
- Distance: 39.8 km (24.7 mi) from Mering
- Platforms: 1 side platform
- Tracks: 1
- Train operators: Bayerische Regiobahn

Other information
- Station code: 8123
- DS100 code: MSAB
- IBNR: 8005639
- Category: 6

Services
Preceding station		Following station
Riederau towards Augsburg-Oberhausen	RB 67	Dießen towards Schongau
Location

St. Alban station (German: Bahnhof St. Alban) is a railway station in the municipality of Dießen am Ammersee, in Bavaria, Germany. It is located on the Mering–Weilheim line of Deutsche Bahn.

== Services ==
As of the December 2021 timetable change, the following services stop at St. Alban:

- RB: hourly service between Augsburg-Oberhausen and Weilheim (Oberbay); some trains continue from Weilheim to Schongau.
