= Schondorf (Bay) station =

Railway station in Bavaria

Schondorf (Bay)
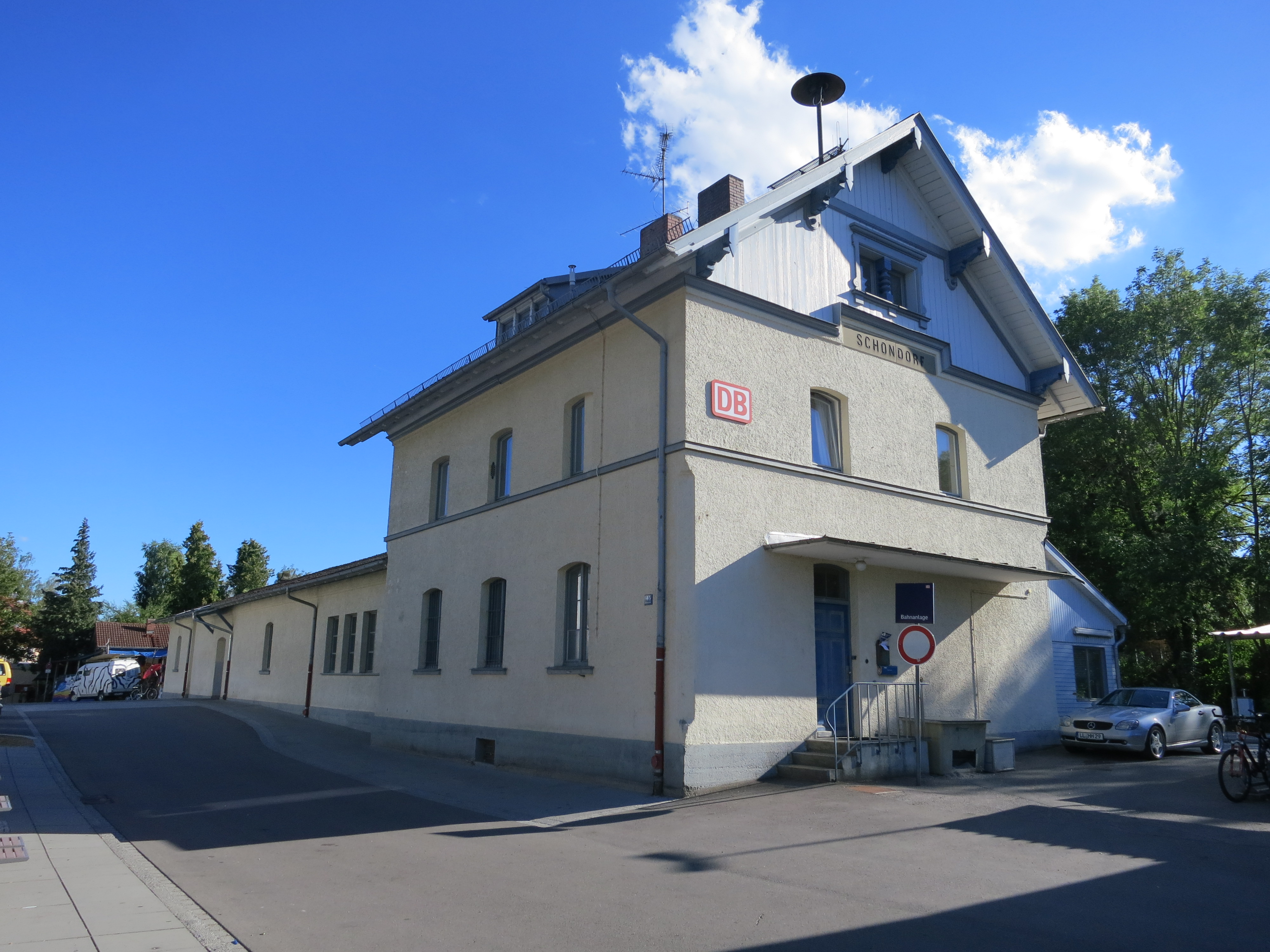
- The station in 2013

General information
- Location: Schondorf, Bavaria; Germany
- Coordinates: 48°03′10″N 11°05′23″E
- Owner: DB Netz
- Operator: DB Station&Service
- Lines: Mering–Weilheim line (KBS 985)
- Distance: 29.8 km (18.5 mi) from Mering
- Platforms: 1 island platform; 1 side platform
- Tracks: 2
- Train operators: Bayerische Regiobahn
- Connections: Landsberger Verkehrsgemeinschaft buses

Other information
- Station code: 5644
- DS100 code: MSDF
- IBNR: 8005417
- Category: 6

Services
Preceding station		Following station
St. Ottilien towards Augsburg-Oberhausen	RB 67	Utting towards Schongau
Location

Schondorf (Bay) station (German: Bahnhof Schondorf (Bay)) is a railway station in the municipality of Schondorf, in Bavaria, Germany. It is located on the Mering–Weilheim line of Deutsche Bahn.

== Services ==
As of the December 2021 timetable change, the following services stop at Schondorf (Bay):

- RB: hourly service between Augsburg-Oberhausen and Weilheim (Oberbay); some trains continue from Weilheim to Schongau.
