= Riederau station =

Railway station in Bavaria

Riederau
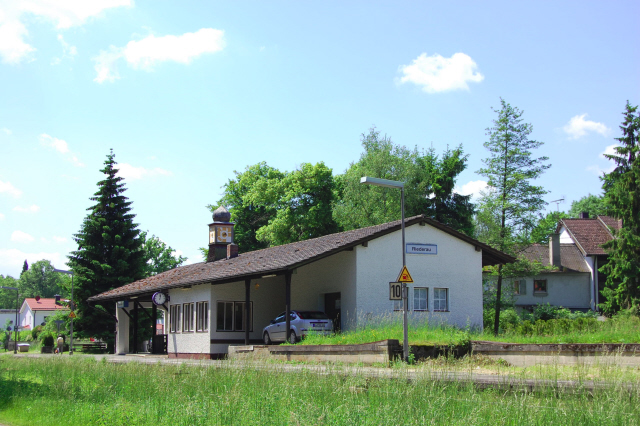
- The station in 2010

General information
- Location: Dießen am Ammersee, Bavaria; Germany
- Coordinates: 47°58′57″N 11°05′50″E
- Owner: DB Netz
- Operator: DB Station&Service
- Lines: Mering–Weilheim line (KBS 985)
- Distance: 37.7 km (23.4 mi) from Mering
- Platforms: 1 side platform
- Tracks: 1
- Train operators: Bayerische Regiobahn
- Connections: Regionalverkehr Oberbayern buses

Other information
- Station code: 5270
- DS100 code: MRDU
- IBNR: 8005086
- Category: 7

Services
Preceding station		Following station
Utting towards Augsburg-Oberhausen	RB 67	St. Alban towards Schongau
Location

Riederau station (German: Bahnhof Riederau) is a railway station in the municipality of Dießen am Ammersee, in Bavaria, Germany. It is located on the Mering–Weilheim line of Deutsche Bahn.

== Services ==
As of the December 2021 timetable change, the following services stop at Riederau:

- RB: hourly service between Augsburg-Oberhausen and Weilheim (Oberbay); some trains continue from Weilheim to Schongau.
