= Dießen am Ammersee =

Dießen an Ammersee
- Municipality
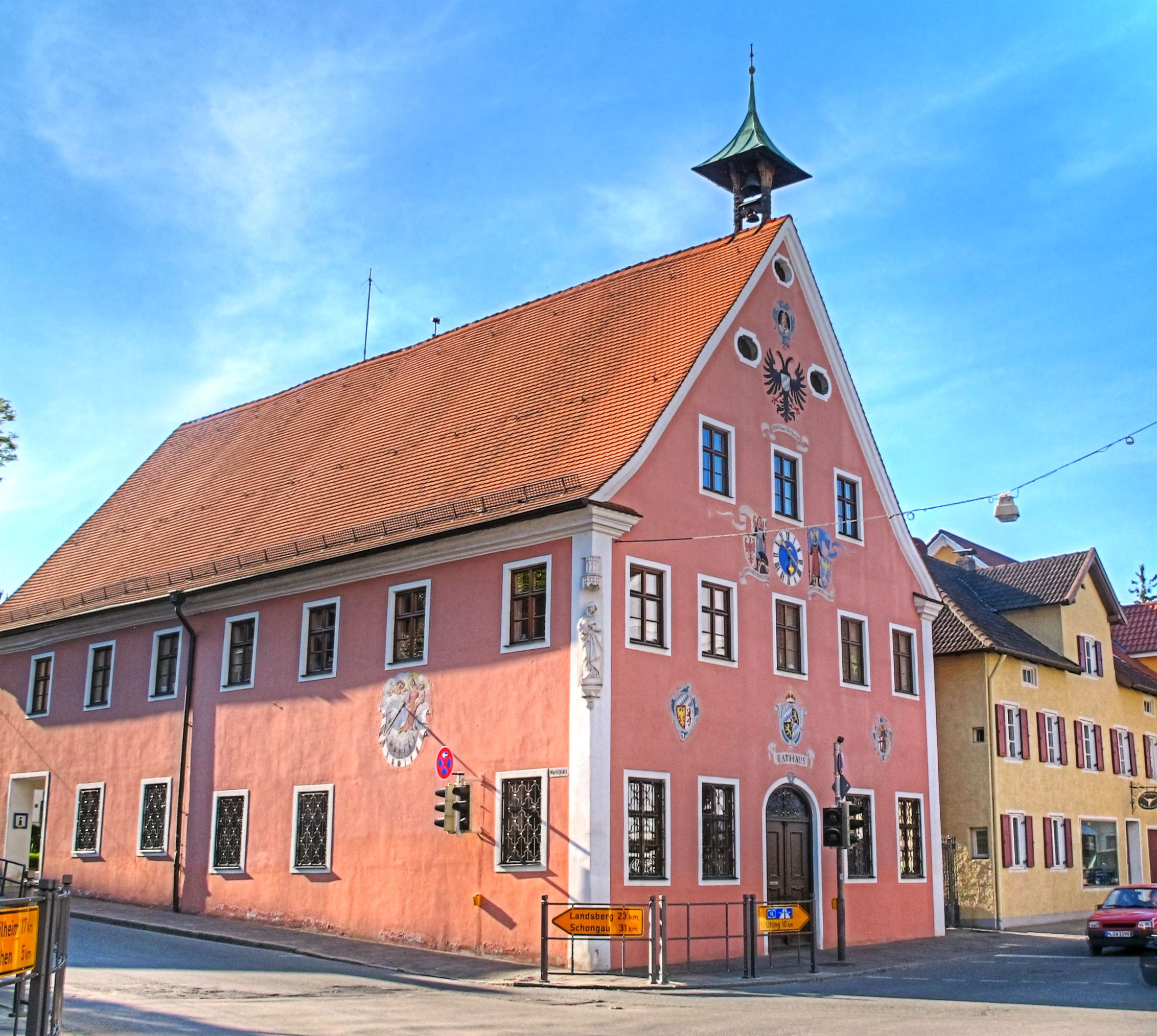
- Town hall

- Coat of arms

- Location of Dießen an Ammersee within Landsberg am Lech district
- Interactive map of Dießen an Ammersee
- Location within Germany Location within Bavaria
- Coordinates: 47°57′N 11°6′E
- Country: Germany
- State: Bavaria
- Admin. region: Oberbayern
- District: Landsberg am Lech

Government
  - Mayor (2020–26): Sandra Perzul

Area
  - Total: 82.66 km^{2} (31.92 sq mi)
- Elevation: 533–719 m (1,749–2,359 ft)

Population (2025-12-31)
  - Total: 10,699
  - Density: 129.4/km^{2} (335.2/sq mi)
- Time zone: UTC+01:00 (CET)
  - Summer (DST): UTC+02:00 (CEST)
- Postal codes: 86911
- Dialling codes: 08807
- Vehicle registration: LL
- Website: www.diessen.de

Dießen am Ammersee (German pronunciation: [ˈdiːsn̩ ʔam ˈʔamɐˌzeː], lit. 'Dießen on the Ammersee'; Southern Bavarian: Diaßn am Ammasä) is a municipality in the district of Landsberg in Bavaria in Germany. It is located on the shores of the Ammersee.

== Geography ==
Situated in the Bavarian Alpine Foreland the town stretches from the shores of the Ammersee to the forested morainic hills of the Saale and Würm glaciation.

The town area consists of the market town of Dießen (with St. Georgen, Wengen, Ziegelstadel, Bischofsried and Seehof) and the former independent boroughs of Rieden (with Riederau, Bierdorf, Lachen, St. Alban and Romenthal), Dettenschwang (with Oberhausen, Unterhausen, Wolfgrub and Abtsried), Dettenhofen (with Pitzeshofen, Engenried, Hübschenried and Ummenhausen) and Obermühlhausen (with Oberbeuern, Unterbeuern and Schlöglhof).

== History ==
In Roman times the Via Raetia passed through the area of the modern town.

The first documentary mention of the village "Diezen" dates from 1039, the name meaning waterfall. From 1050 on a local nobility is mentioned, the family of the Counts of Dießen-Andechs. The counts had their castle on the south of the town on the Schatzberg and in the years between 1121 and 1127, they founded the Dießen monastery. Around 1140 the family moved to Wolfratshausen and left the town to the monastery though they still acted as bailiffs.

With the extinction of the Counts of Andechs in 1248, the Wittelsbacher took over the bailiwick of the monastery. Already in 1251 the place appears as the market town of Diessen.

In the course of the war between Ludwig the Bavarian and Frederick the Fair Dießen was burned in 1318 and 1320 by the troops of Duke Leopold. After the victorious battle of Mühldorf Ludwig raised the place to Bannmarkt.

This meant that until secularisation in 1803, there were two strictly separate legal areas in the area of today's township, the ducal and later electoral Bannmarkt Dießen and the Klosterhofmark Dießen-St. Georgen.

The market Dießen itself was under the control of ducal, later electoral judges, who also held jurisdiction over the Ammersee and since 1599 also over the forested area west of the town called Forst Bayerdießen. This market judge office even held the blood or high jurisdiction.

In the Thirty Years' War the town was plundered by Swedish troops in 1632 and most of its inhabitants fled either to Erlaich island in the lake or the extensive forests around town.

In the War of the Spanish Succession Dießen was again looted in 1703 by Austrian troops, the population fled again to Erlaich island in the lake. Already in 1704 it came to further raids by hussars. In the years 1743 and 1744 it came again to a cast by Austrian troops.

The monastery church, the Marienmünster, was rebuilt in the years 1732 to 1739 by the Baroque master builder Johann Michael Fischer. The monastery was dissolved in 1803 in the course of secularization and parts of the monastery were demolished and most of its land sold off.

With the start of steam shipping on the lake and the railroad service from Augsburg to Weilheim towards the end of the 19th century, Dießen became a center of attraction for artists and a center of the arts and crafts movement.

From the 1920s onwards the town expanded in all directions with new settlement and building areas.

== Dießen Abbey ==
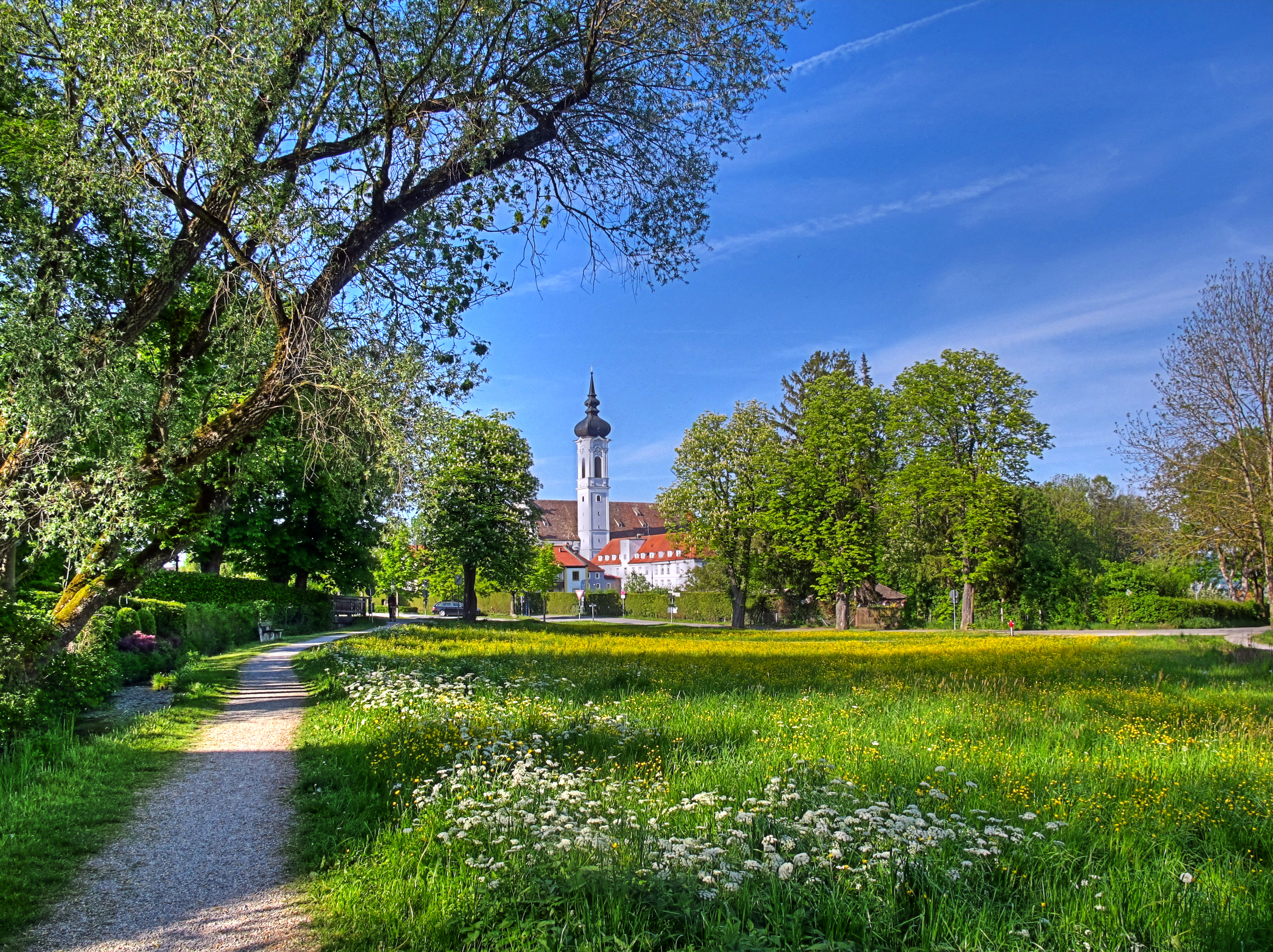

=== First foundation ===
The first documentary mention stems from the year 815, when Rathard founded a monastery in St. Georgen and built the first church there. It was presumably a re-foundation of an older monastery established by the Huosi, since the first larger landed property of the monastery was around the town of Raisting, a heartland of the Huosi. The first monastery was already destroyed in 955 by the marauding Hungarians, the nuns were raped and murdered and the monastery burnt down.

=== Second foundation ===
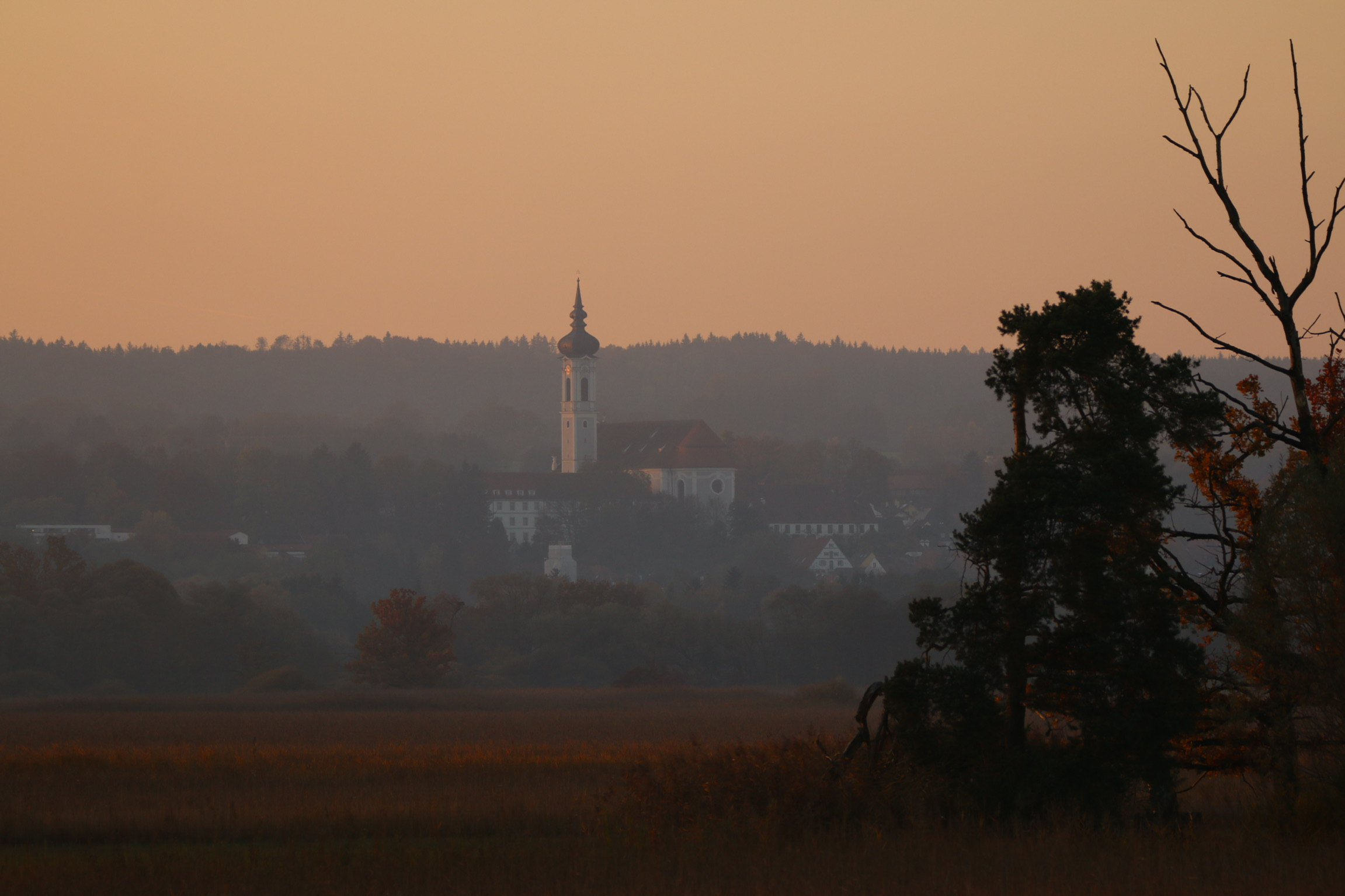

The second monastery, which was consecrated to Our Lady was founded 1132 by the Counts of Dießen. In 1150 the Counts gifted their manor to the new monastery.

In 1157, the Counts of Dießen bequeathed to the monastery all their possessions in and around Dießen with all serfs, fish rights and forests. The castle of the Counts went to the monastery too, but with the order to demolish it.

While the monastery shortly held the jurisdiction over the town of Dießen, by 1326 the free market won all its rights back. This led to the existence of two clearly separated legal areas in the town. Although the monastery lost jurisdiction over the market around 80 estates were still allodial to the monastery.

The jurisdiction area of the Augustiner-Chorherrenstift itself included Raisting, Lachen, Bierdorf, Engenried, St. Alban, Riederau, Rieden, St. Georgen, Wengen, Bischofsried and Pitzeshofen.

In the years 1632 and 1634, the monastery was looted by the Swedes, 1704 by troops of the emperor.

In 1673 under Provost Renatus Sunday an extension or partial rebuilding of the monastery took place. Under Provost Herkulan Karg the new monastery church was finished in 1739.

The monastery was dissolved in 1803 during the secularization in Bavaria. Most of the Abbey's possessions were sold to private citizens, only the vast forest was transferred to the state. At the time of the dissolution, 18 convent lords and 5 lay brothers lived in the monastery.

In 1917, nuns from Augsburg acquired the surviving convent buildings and operated their mother house there until 1968. In 2014, the monastery was abandoned by the last nuns.

Since 2018 the buildings of the Abbey house a psychosomatic clinic.

== Transport ==
=== Railway ===
Dießen has three stations (Riederau, St. Alban, and Dießen) on the Ammersee Railway. The railway was opened in 1898.

=== Ammersee shipping ===
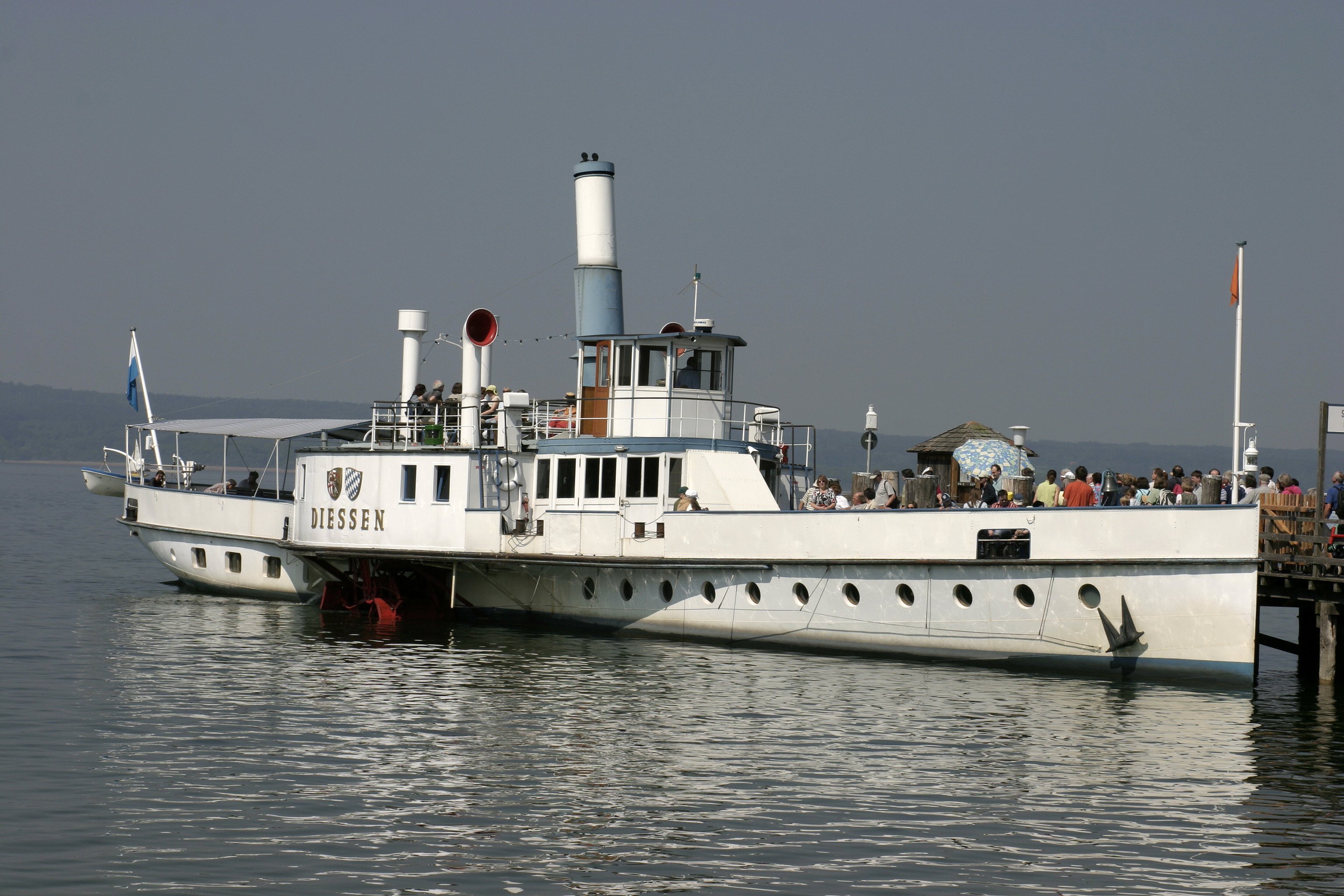
Paddle motor ship Diessen on Ammersee

In 1877, twelve Dießen citizens founded the steamship company Ammersee AG.

From Easter Sunday to Kirchweih, the four passenger ships of the Bayerische Seenschifffahrt can be used to reach other places on the Ammersee. From Herrsching, located on the eastern shore of the lake, the Munich S-Bahn runs in about 50 minutes via the Munich-Herrsching railway line to Munich Central Station.

The oldest passenger ship still in regular service today is the paddle steamer Diessen launched in 1908.

== Sources ==
- Weißhaar-Kiem, Heide (2010). Landkreis Landsberg am Lech. Landsberg am Lech: Landkreis Landsberg am Lech. pp. 170–179.
- Schnurer O.P., M. Aquinata (1976). Heimatbuch des Marktes Dießen a. Ammersee. Diessen: Markt Dießen a. Ammersee. pp. 19–231.
- Hugo, Josef Anto (1901). Chronik des Marktes und der Pfarrei Diessen. Diessen: Markt Dießen a. Ammersee. pp. 41–68.
- Fried, Pankraz (1991). Aus Schwaben und Altbayern. München. pp. 122–124.
- Schweizer, Bruno (1999). Das Dießener Heimatbüchlein. Dießen am Ammersee. pp. 4–48.
