= Schmiechen (Schwab) station =

Railway station in Germany

Schmiechen (Schwab)
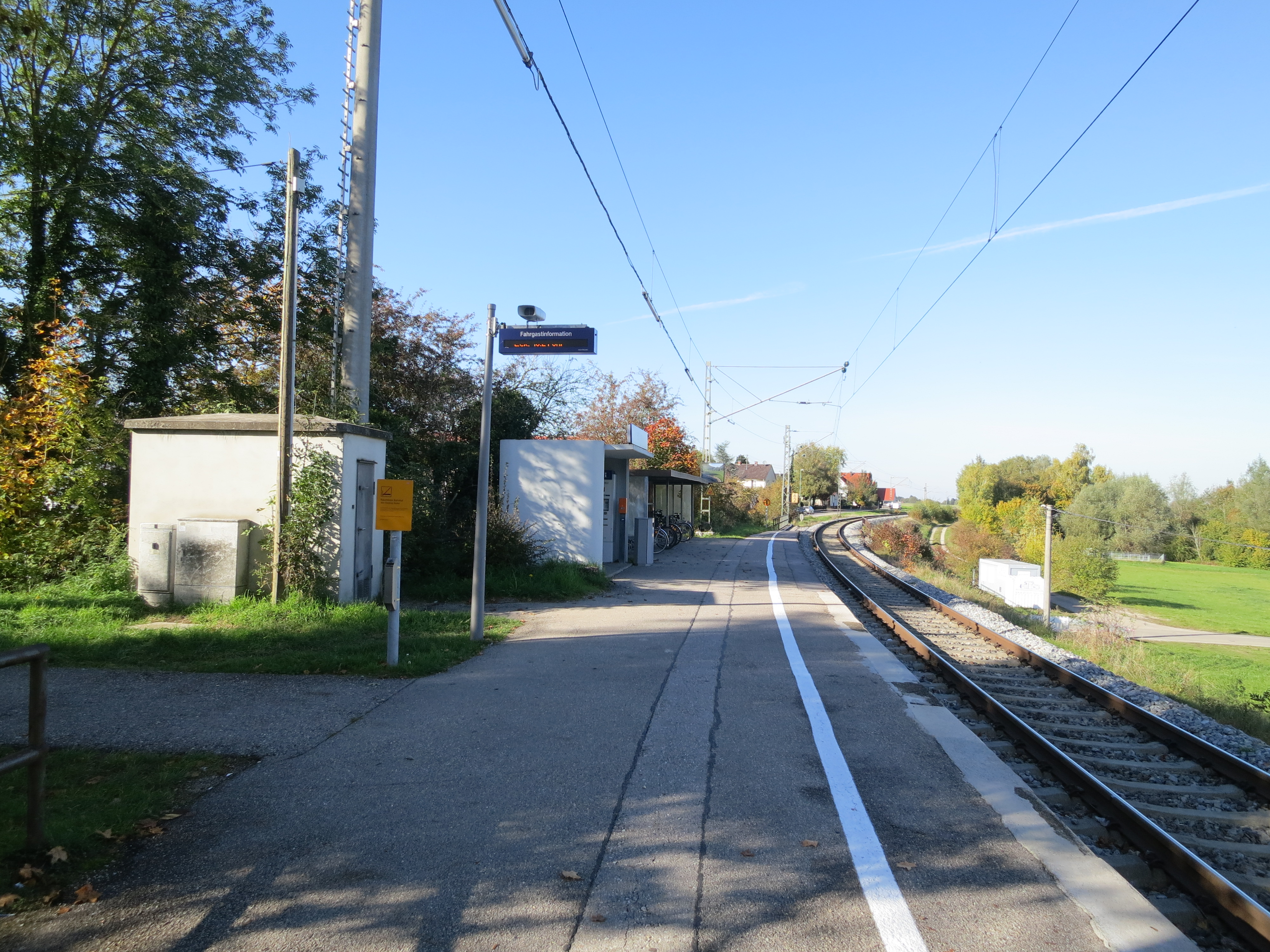
- 2013

General information
- Location: Am Bahnhof 1; 86511 Schmiechen; Bavaria; Germany
- Coordinates: 48°12′47.2″N 10°58′40.2″E
- Owner: DB Netz
- Operator: DB Station&Service
- Line: Ammersee Railway
- Platforms: 1
- Tracks: 1
- Train operators: Bayerische Regiobahn

Other information
- Station code: 5609
- DS100 code: MSCN
- IBNR: 8005381
- Category: 7
- Fare zone: : 50
- Website: www.bahnhof.de

Services
Preceding station		Following station
Merching towards Augsburg-Oberhausen	RB 67	Egling towards Schongau
Location
- Location within Bavaria Location within Germany Location within Europe

Schmiechen (Schwab) is a railway station in the municipality of Schmiechen, located in the district of Aichach-Friedberg in Swabia, Germany.
