= Merching station =

Railway station in Germany

Merching
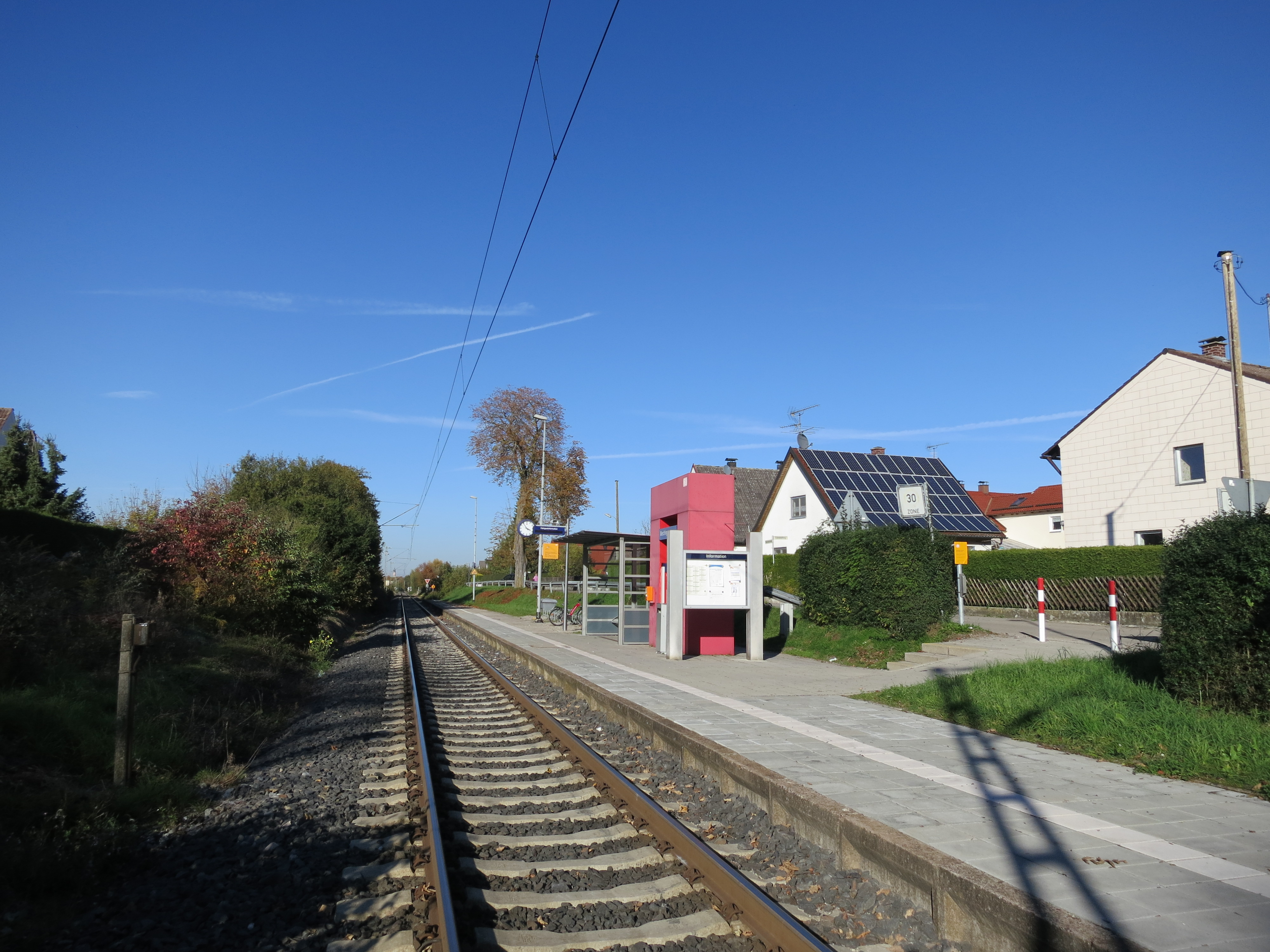
- 2013

General information
- Location: Westendstraße 1; 86504 Mering; Bavaria; Germany
- Coordinates: 48°15′46.4″N 10°59′18.6″E
- Owner: DB Netz
- Operator: DB Station&Service
- Lines: Ammersee Railway (KBS 985)
- Platforms: 1
- Tracks: 1
- Train operators: Bayerische Regiobahn

Other information
- Station code: 4062
- DS100 code: MMEG
- IBNR: 8003979
- Category: 7
- Fare zone: : 40 and 50
- Website: www.bahnhof.de

Services
Preceding station		Following station
Mering towards Augsburg-Oberhausen	RB 67	Schmiechen (Schwab) towards Schongau
Location
- Location within Bavaria Location within Germany Location within Europe

Merching station is a railway station in the municipality of Merching, located in the district of Aichach-Friedberg in Swabia, Germany.
