= Eresing =

- Municipality
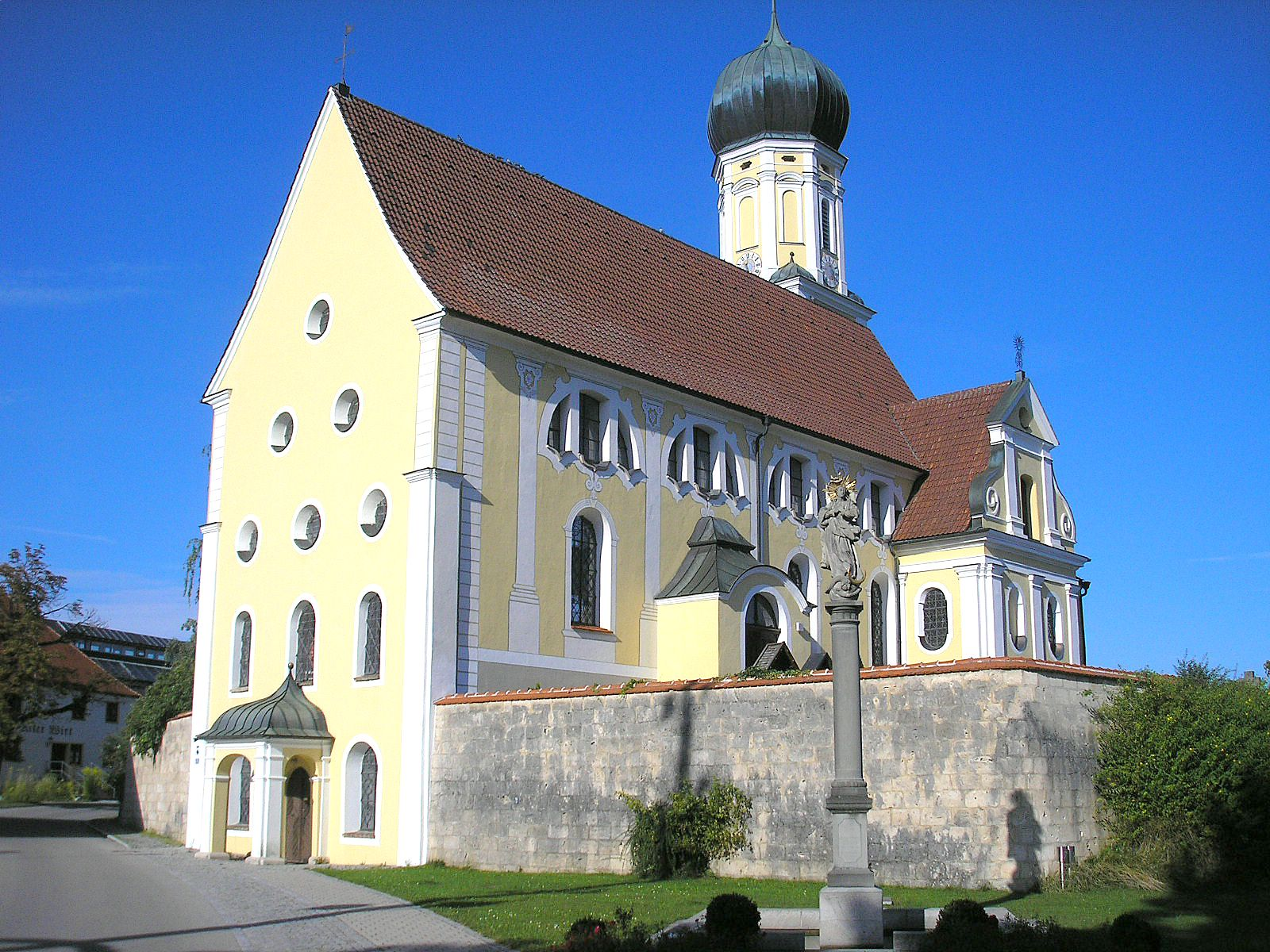
- Church of Saint Ulrich

- Coat of arms

- Location of Eresing within Landsberg am Lech district
- Interactive map of Eresing
- Location within Germany Location within Bavaria
- Coordinates: 48°04′N 11°01′E
- Country: Germany
- State: Bavaria
- Admin. region: Oberbayern
- District: Landsberg am Lech
- Municipal assoc.: Windach
- Subdivisions: 4 Ortsteile

Government
  - Mayor (2020–26): Michael Klotz

Area
  - Total: 14.22 km^{2} (5.49 sq mi)
- Elevation: 600 m (2,000 ft)

Population (2025-12-31)
  - Total: 2,080
  - Density: 146/km^{2} (379/sq mi)
- Time zone: UTC+01:00 (CET)
  - Summer (DST): UTC+02:00 (CEST)
- Postal codes: 86922
- Dialling codes: 08193
- Vehicle registration: LL
- Website: www.eresing.de

Eresing is a municipality in the district of Landsberg in Bavaria in Germany.

== Transport ==
The municipality has a railway station, St. Ottilien, on the Mering–Weilheim line.
