= Utting am Ammersee =

Place in Bavaria, Germany

- Municipality
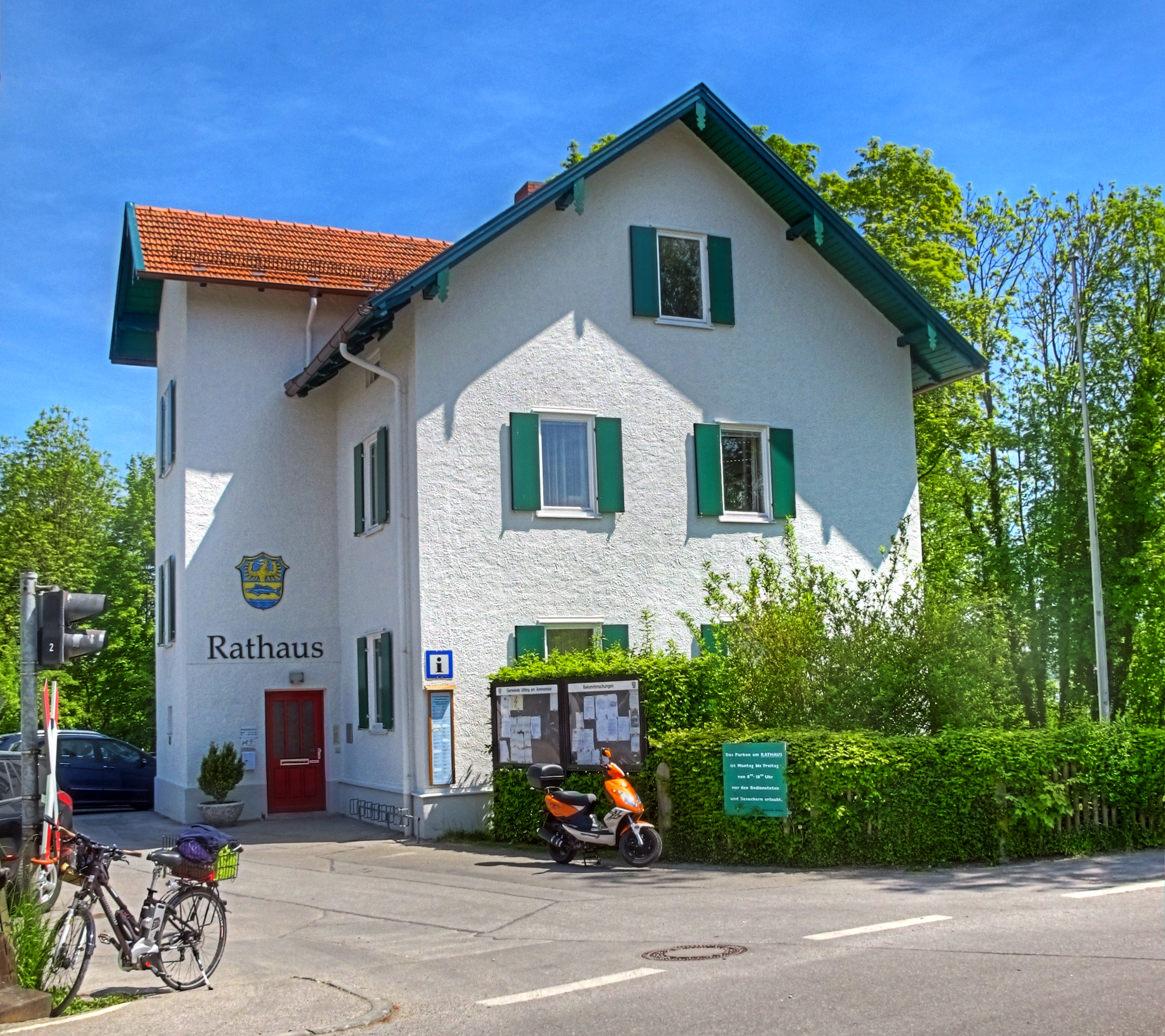
- Town hall

- Coat of arms

- Location of Utting am Ammersee within Landsberg am Lech district
- Interactive map of Utting am Ammersee
- Location within Germany Location within Bavaria
- Coordinates: 48°2′N 11°5′E
- Country: Germany
- State: Bavaria
- Admin. region: Oberbayern
- District: Landsberg am Lech

Government
  - Mayor (2020–26): Florian Hoffmann

Area
  - Total: 19.01 km^{2} (7.34 sq mi)
- Elevation: 554 m (1,818 ft)

Population (2025-12-31)
  - Total: 4,561
  - Density: 239.9/km^{2} (621.4/sq mi)
- Time zone: UTC+01:00 (CET)
  - Summer (DST): UTC+02:00 (CEST)
- Postal codes: 86919
- Dialling codes: 08806
- Vehicle registration: LL
- Website: www.utting.de

Utting am Ammersee (German pronunciation: [ˈʊtɪŋ ʔam ˈʔamɐˌzeː], lit. 'Utting on the Ammersee'; until 1953 just Utting) is a municipality in the district of Landsberg in Bavaria in Germany.

== History ==
During World War II, a subcamp of Dachau concentration camp was located in the town.

== Transport ==
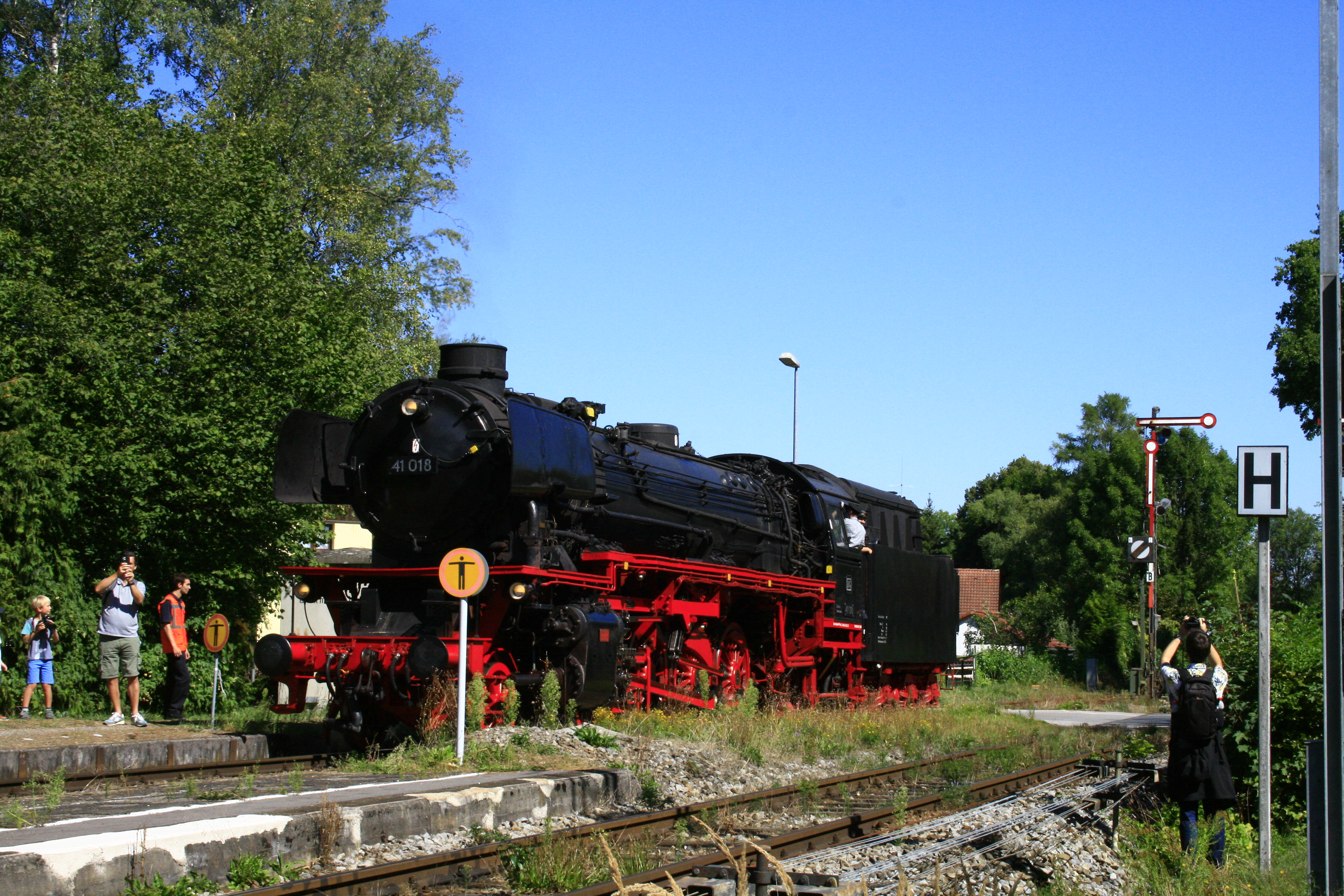
Ammersee-Dampfbahn Utting

The municipality has a railway station, Utting, on the Mering–Weilheim line.
