= Marienmünster church =

Church in Dießen am Ammersee, Upper Bavaria, Germany

Coordinates: 47.9482°N 11.0975°E

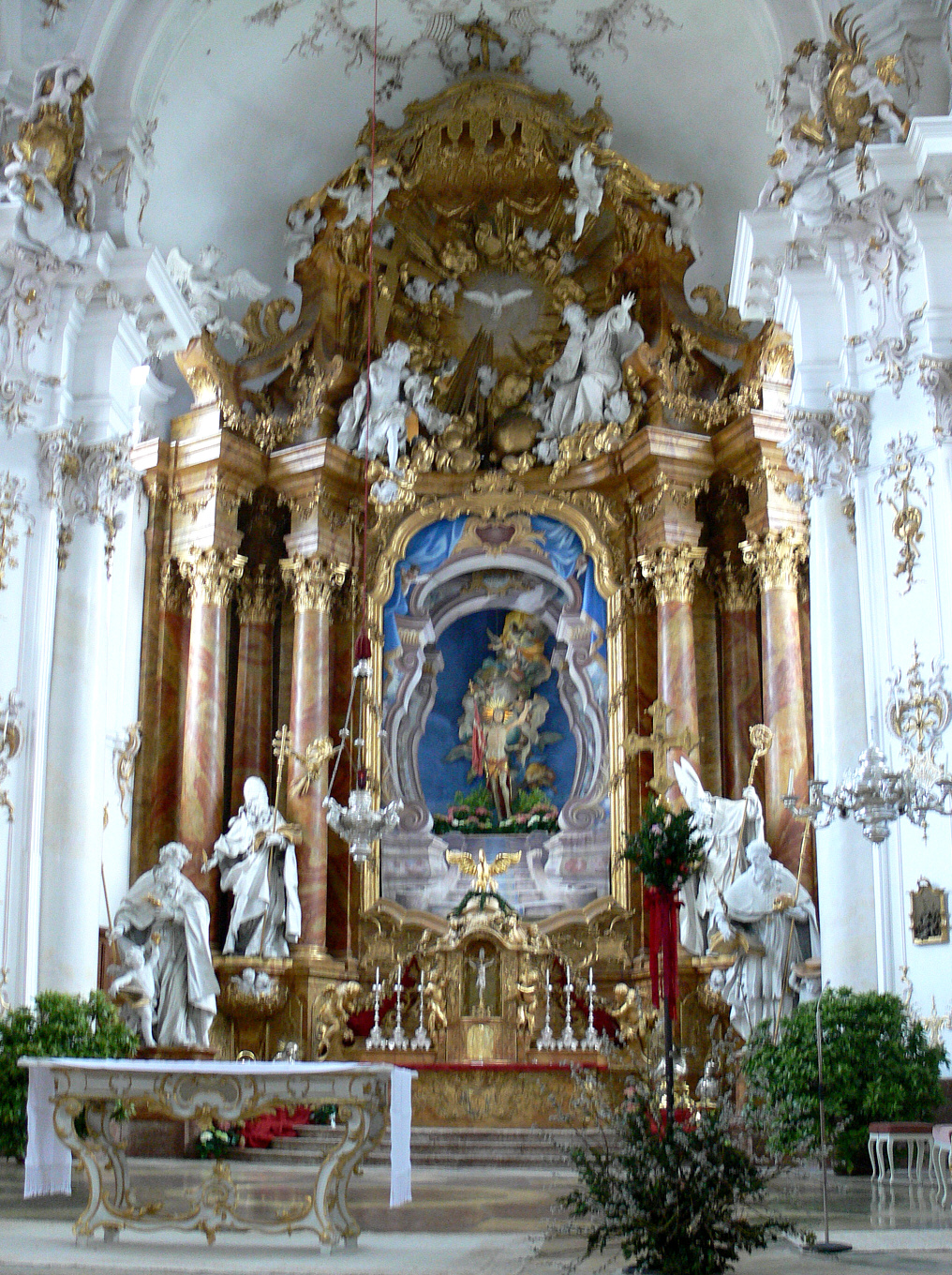
The Altar

Dießen Marienmünster Church is a Baroque style church in Dießen am Ammersee in the German district of Landsberg am Lech in Upper Bavaria.

== Architecture and style ==
The architecture, furnishing and art combine to form one of the finest expressions of 18th century Baroque style in Bavaria. The inside of the church is filled with Baroque statues, paintings, frescoes and decorative art.

== Organ ==
The church organ was built by Caspar König around 1739 and in 1878, it was renovated and rebuilt. In 1959, the instrument was completely restored by Orgelbau Schmid; the interior of the organ was rebuilt, along with its console. In the course of the 1984-1987 restoration by Schmid, the organ was given an additional swell and more registers. It now has 39 registers on three manuals and a pedal.

== Music ==
The church has played Baroque and classical music for many years, the most notorious being the selection of Baroque music by Johann Sebastian Bach. A famous recording of 1969 by Karl Richter as maestro performing the "Mass in B minor" was recorded in the church.

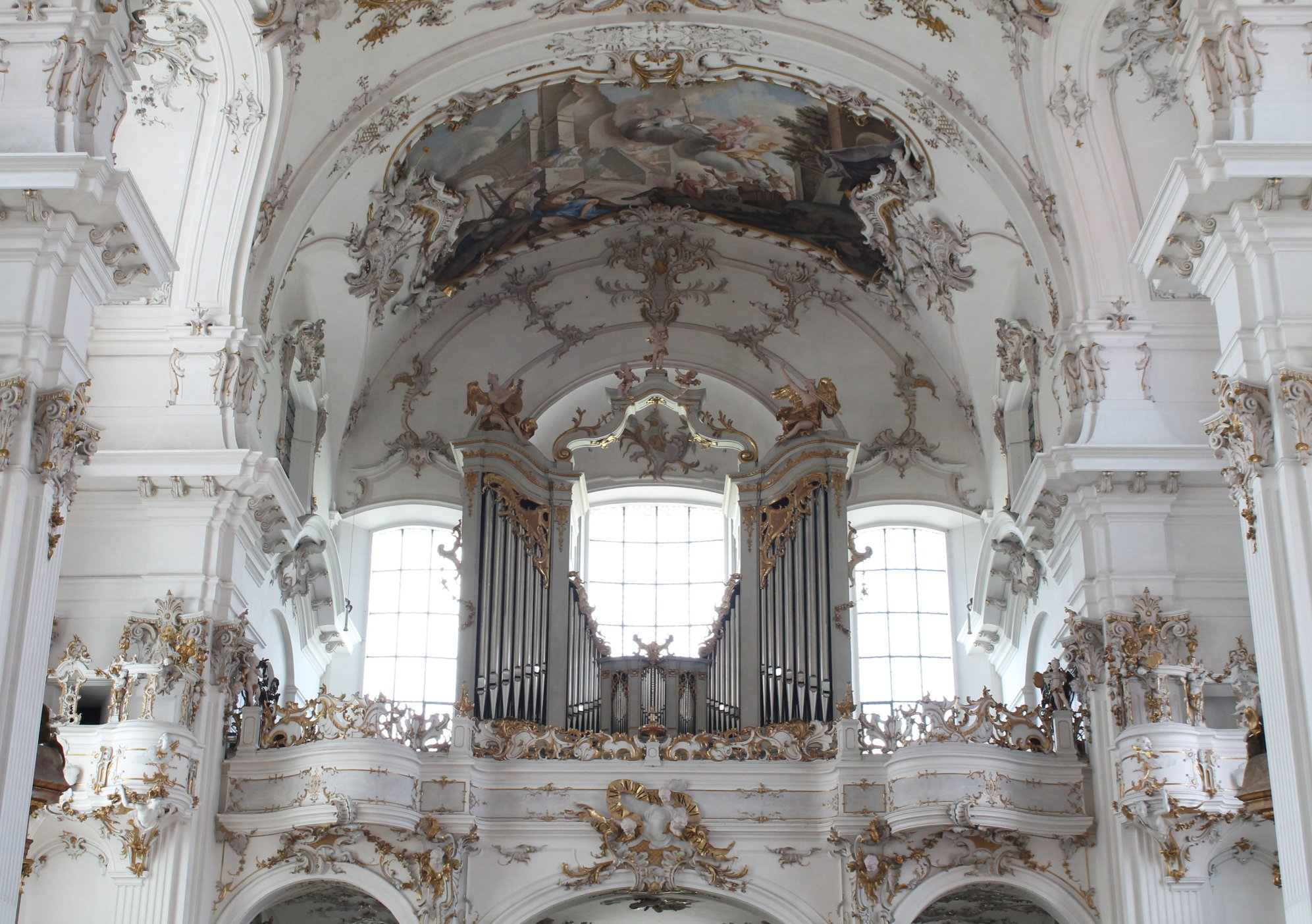
The organ

== Gallery ==
Gallery of the interior of the church
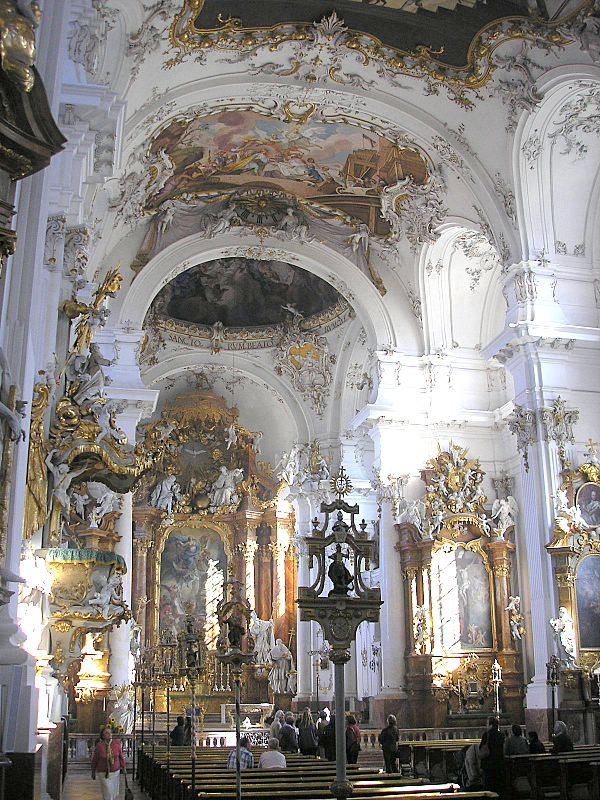

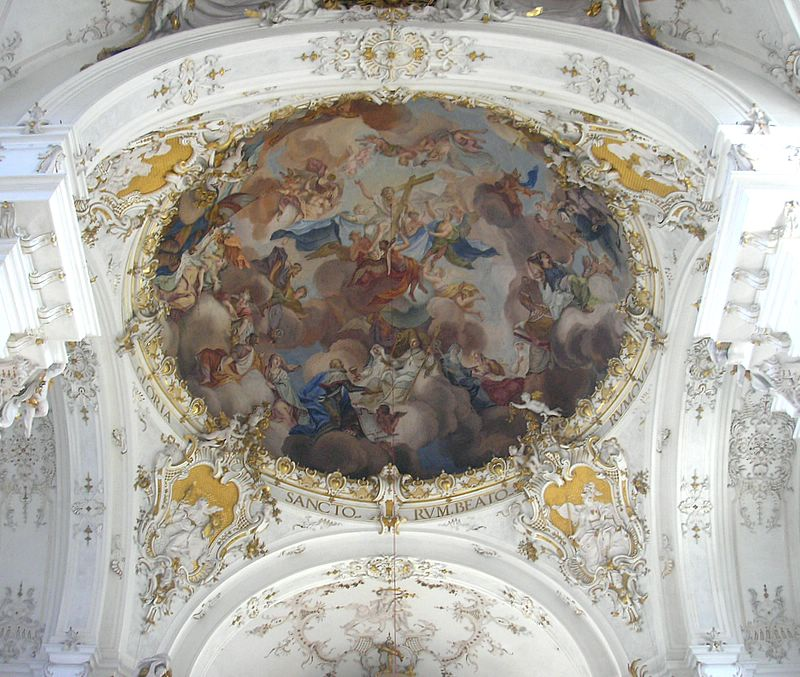

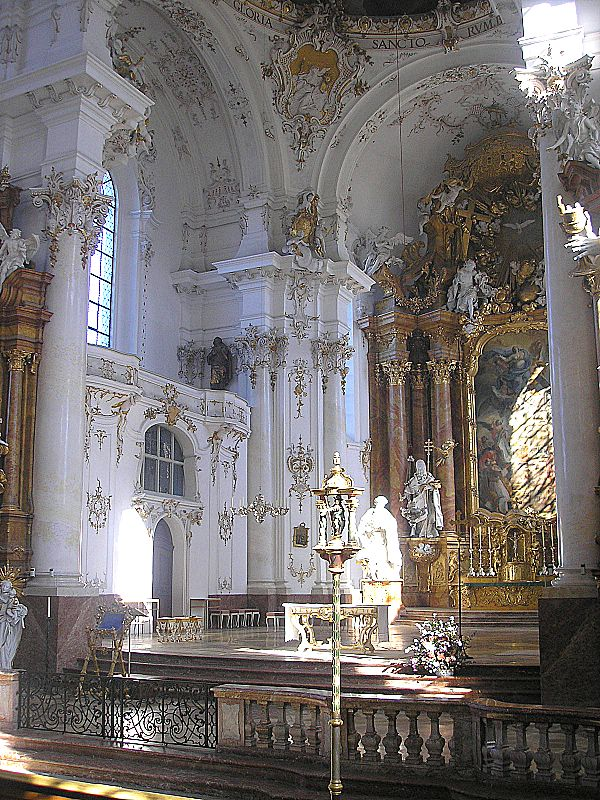

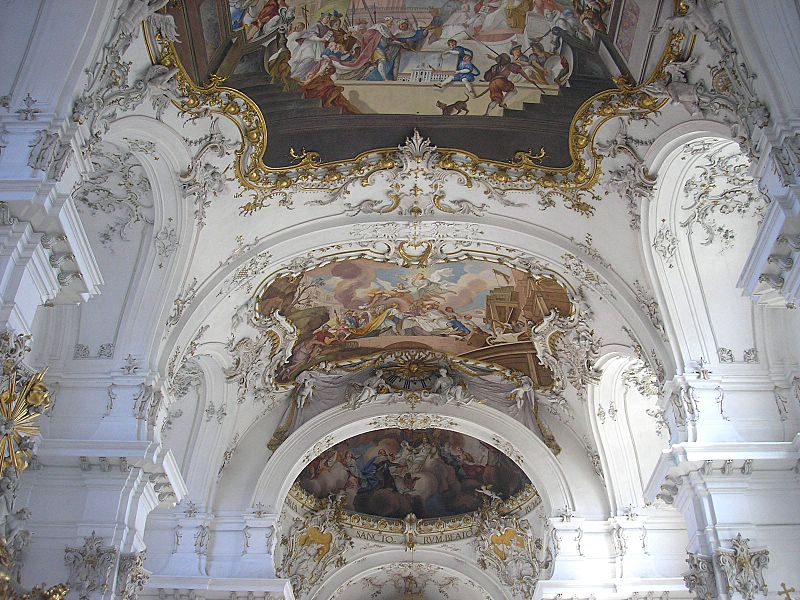
