= Bayerische Seenschifffahrt =

Bayerische Seenschifffahrt GmbH
- Company type: Gesellschaft
- Industry: Transportation
- Founded: 1997
- Headquarters: Schönau am Königssee, Germany
- Website: seenschifffahrt.de

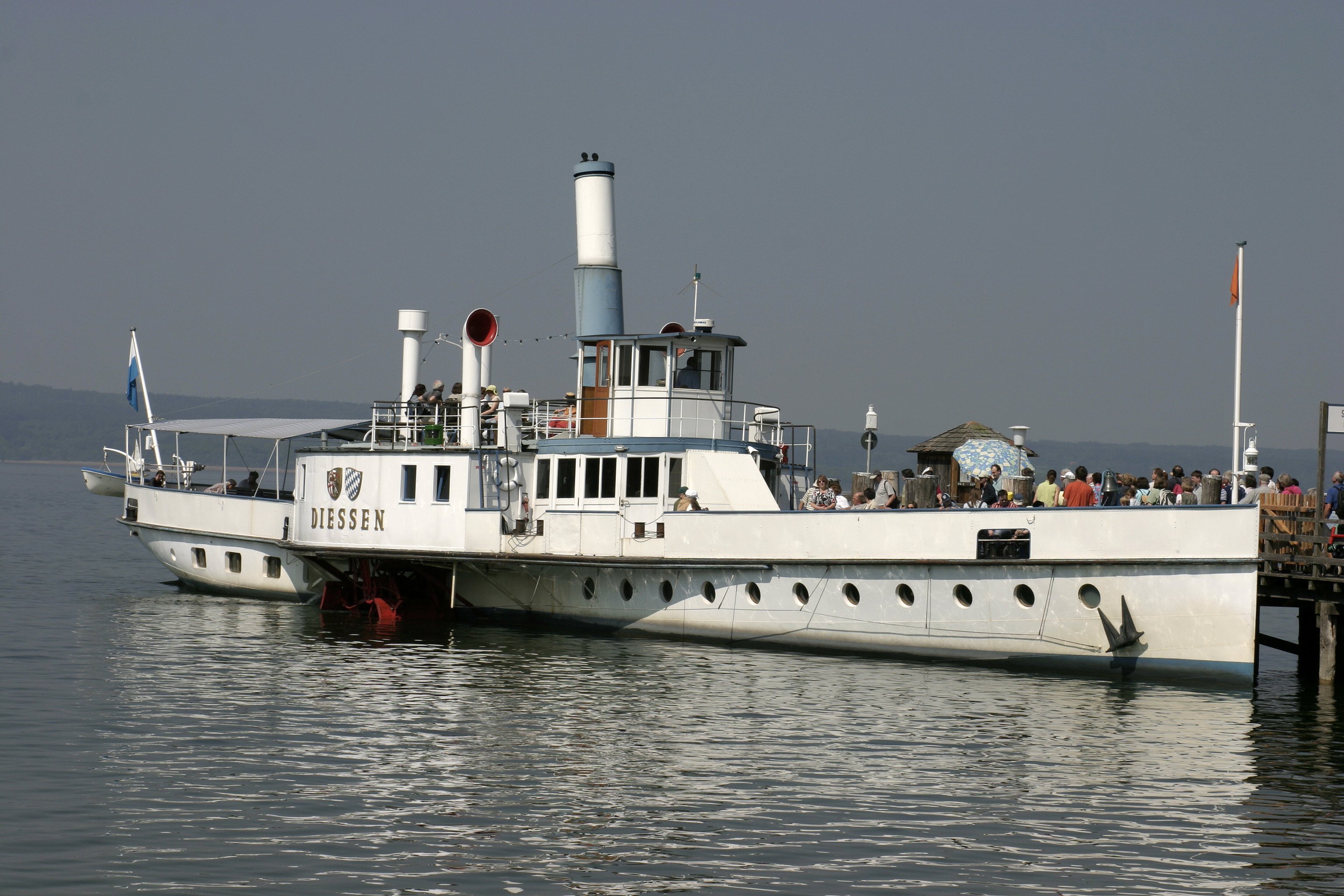
Paddle ship Diessen on the Ammersee

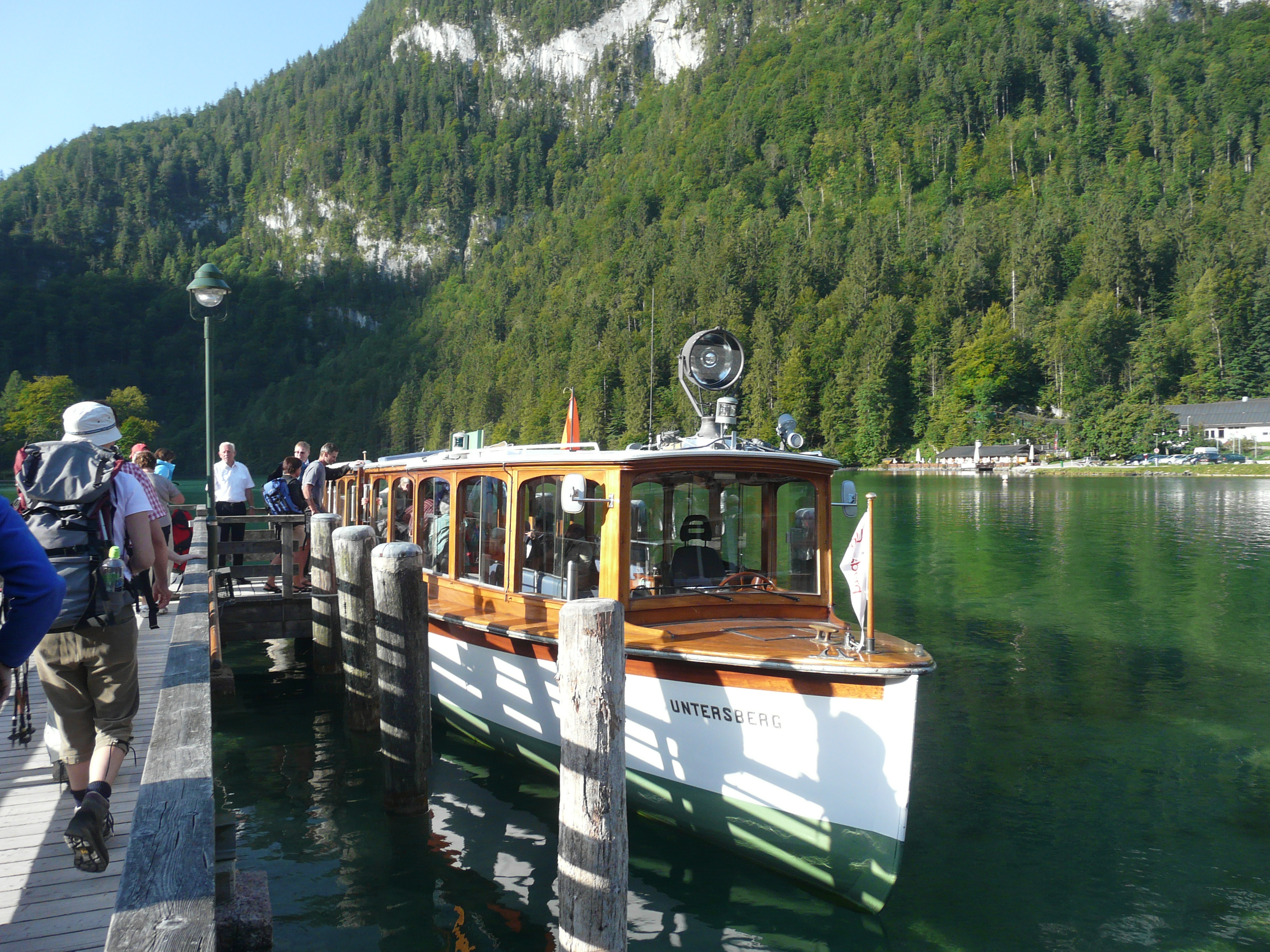
An electric passenger launch at Schönau on the Königssee

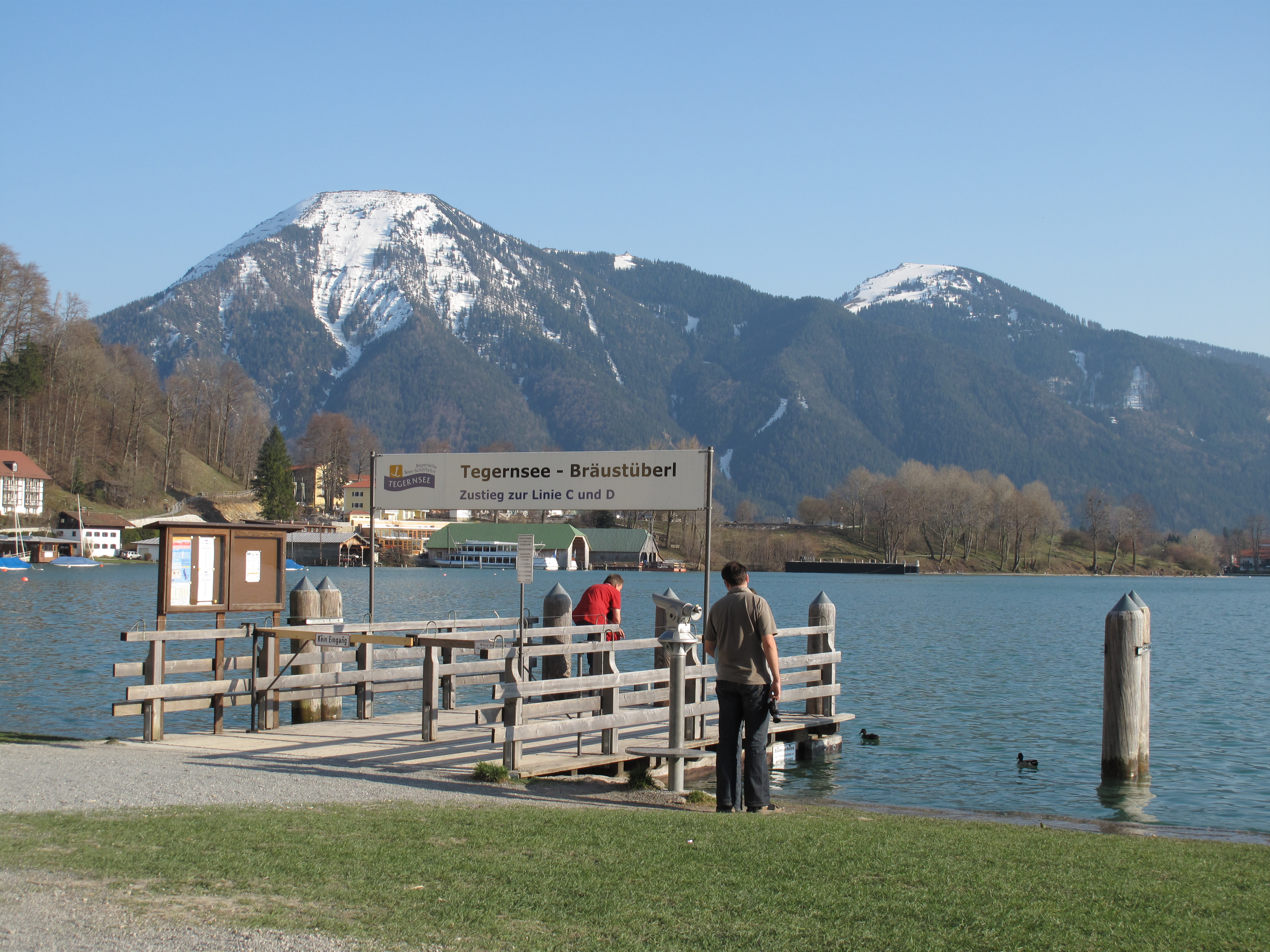
A company landing stage on the Tegernsee, with boatyard in the background

The Bayerische Seenschifffahrt GmbH, or Bavarian Lakes Shipping Company, is a company that operates shipping services on several lakes in the German state of Bavaria. Services operate on the Königssee, the Starnberger See, the Ammersee and the Tegernsee.

The Bayerische Seenschifffahrt company was created in 1997, to operate services on the four lakes that were previously operated directly by the Bavarian state government. These services date back to 1851 (on the Starnberger See), 1879 (on the Ammersee), 1894 (on the Tegernsee) and 1909 (on the Königssee). The company is owned by the state of Bavaria, and has some 160 employees.

The company operates 34 vessels of a variety of types. On the Ammersee it operates a fleet of motor ships, including both propeller-driven and paddle-driven vessels. One of the latter, the Diessen, dates back to 1908 and was originally steam powered. On the Starnberger See and Tegernsee conventional propeller-driven motor vessels are operated. On the environmentally sensitive Königssee only battery-electric launches are permitted, and a fleet of 18 such launches is operated.

Similar passenger services on the Chiemsee, Bavaria's largest internal lake, are operated by the private sector Chiemsee Schifffahrt company. The international Lake Constance White Fleet operates ferry and cruise services on Lake Constance, on which Bavaria has a shore.
