= Mering station =

Railway station in Bavaria, Germany

Mering
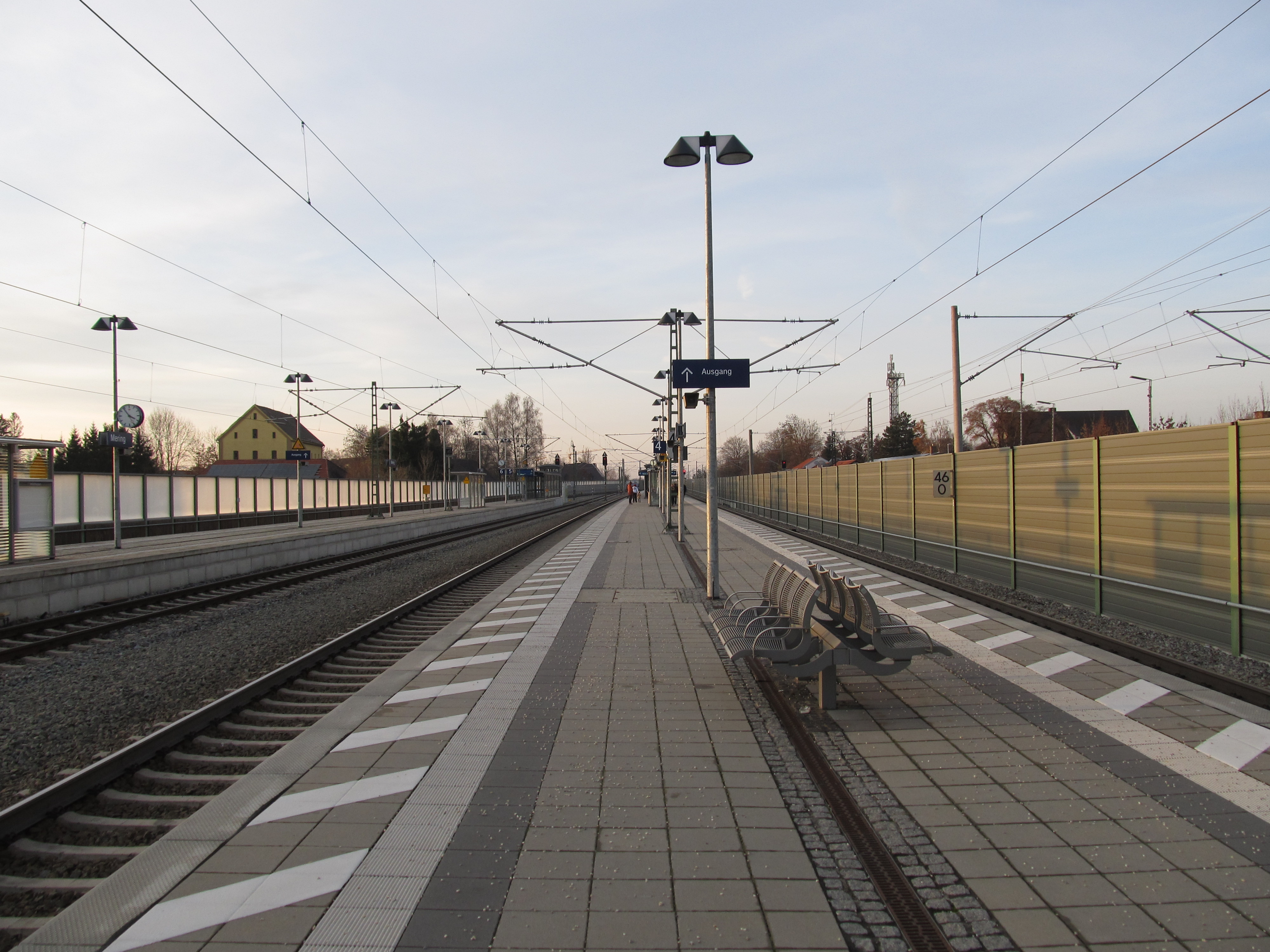

General information
- Location: Bahnhofstraße 4; 86415 Mering; Bavaria; Germany
- Coordinates: 48.2625°N 10.9886°E
- Owner: Deutsche Bahn
- Operator: DB Netz; DB Station&Service
- Lines: Ammersee Railway; Munich–Augsburg railway
- Train operators: Bayerische Regiobahn; Go-Ahead Bayern

Other information
- Station code: 4064
- DS100 code: MMR
- IBNR: 8003982
- Category: 3
- Fare zone: : 40
- Website: www.bahnhof.de

History
- Opened: 4 October 1840; 185 years ago

Services
Preceding station		Following station
Mering-St Afra towards Ulm Hbf	RE 9	Munich-Pasing towards München Hbf
Mering-St Afra towards Würzburg Hbf	RE 80	Munich-Pasing towards München Hbf
Mering-St Afra towards Aalen Hbf	RE 89	Munich-Pasing towards München Hbf
Mering-St Afra towards Dinkelscherben	RB 86	Althegnenberg towards München Hbf
Mering-St Afra towards Donauwörth	RB 87	Althegnenberg towards München Hbf
Preceding station		Following station
Mering-St Afra towards Augsburg-Oberhausen	RB 67	Merching towards Schongau
Location
- Location within Bavaria Location within Germany Location within Europe

Mering station is a railway station in the municipality of Mering, located in the district of Aichach-Friedberg in Swabia, Germany.
