= Mering–Weilheim railway =

Railway line in Bavaria, Germany

Mering–Weilheim
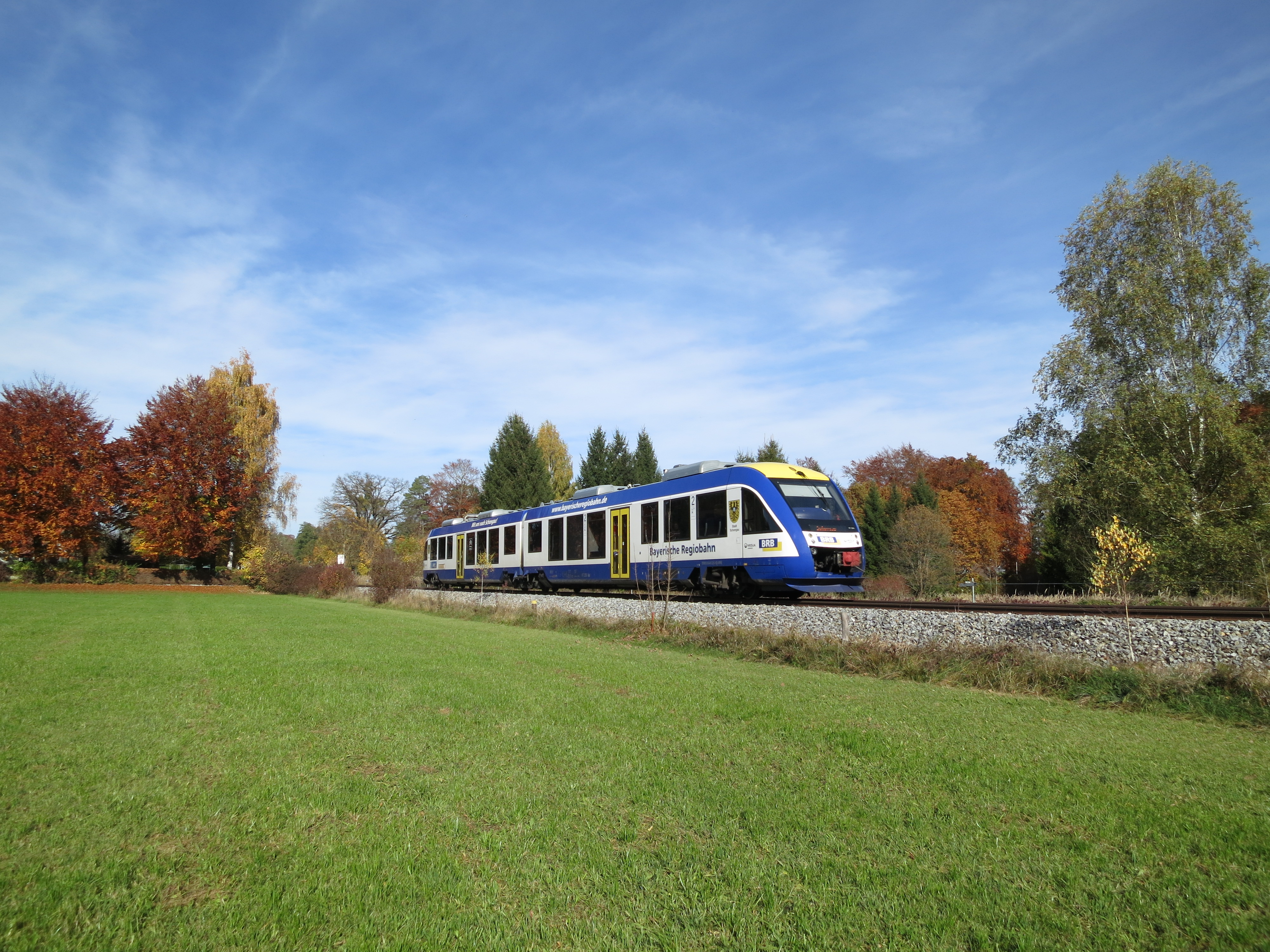
- A LINT train near Utting in 2013

Overview
- Native name: Ammerseebahn
- Status: Operational
- Owner: Deutsche Bahn
- Line number: 5370
- Locale: Bavaria
- Termini: Mering; Weilheim (Oberbay)
- Stations: 14

Service
- Type: Heavy rail, Passenger rail Regional rail
- Route number: 985
- Operator(s): Bayerische Regiobahn

History
- Opened: 1898

Technical
- Line length: 54.6 km (33.9 mi)
- Number of tracks: Single track
- Track gauge: 1,435 mm (4 ft 8 1/2 in) standard gauge
- Electrification: 15 kV/16.7 Hz AC Overhead line (Mering–Geltendorf)
Route map
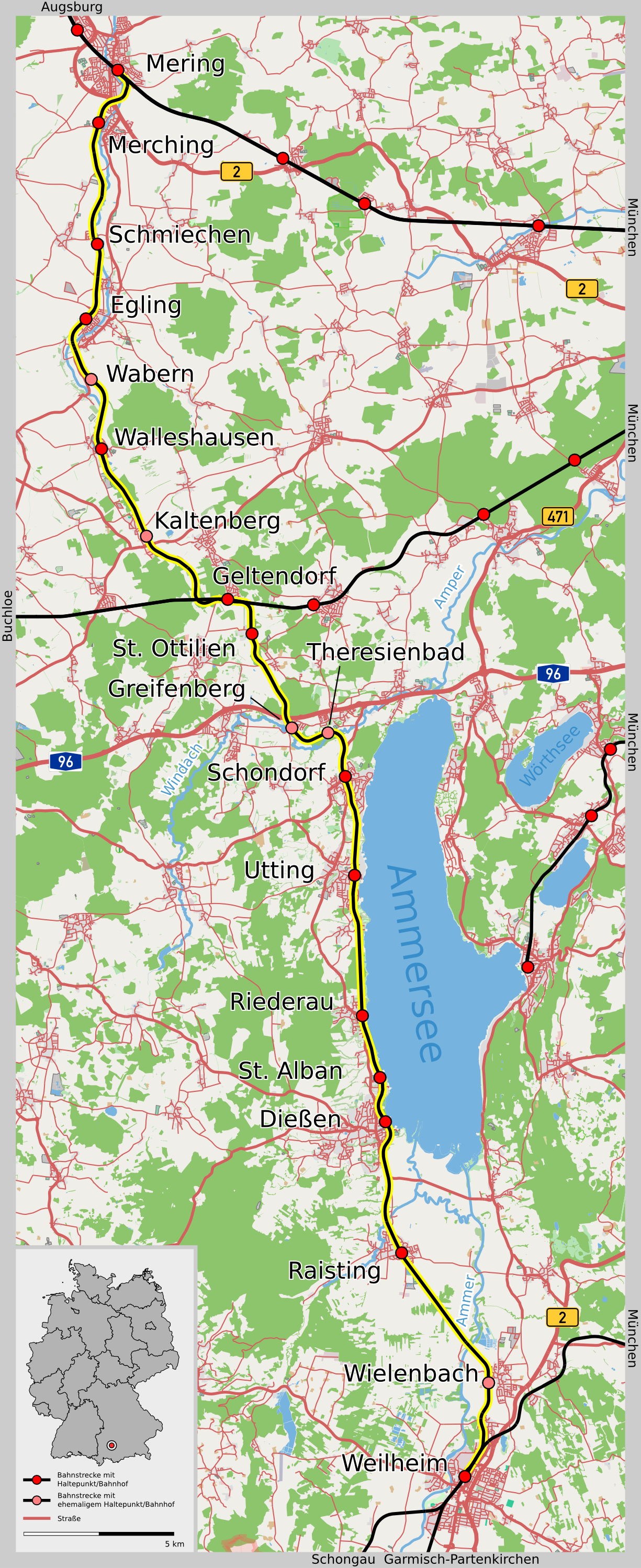
- Source: German railway atlas

The Mering–Weilheim railway (German: Ammerseebahn) is a 54 km long single-tracked main line in the provinces of Swabia and Upper Bavaria in southern Germany. It runs from Mering near Augsburg via Geltendorf to Weilheim and is listed by the Deutsche Bahn as Kursbuchstrecke 985.

== Construction ==
The Mering–Geltendorf–Schondorf (29.77 km) and Weilheim–Dießen (13.07 km) sections were the first to be constructed. They were built by the Augsburg railway division of the Royal Bavarian State Railways and were completed simultaneously on 30 June 1898. The intervening 18.36 km section from Dießen to Schondorf was finished on 24 December 1898.

== Electrification ==
The line was electrified between Mering and Geltendorf from 7 September 1970 in order to provide a diversionary line for the heavily trafficked trunk route from Augsburg to Munich, the Geltendorf–Munich-Pasing section having been electrified two years earlier.

Nowadays the Ammersee Railway in only of regional importance. Trains run hourly from Augsburg-Oberhausen via Weilheim to Schongau and back. Until the early 1990s there were still long-distance trains (the FD-Züge) on the line that did not take the 'bypass' via Munich on their way from the north of Germany to Garmisch-Partenkirchen, but went directly from Augsburg along the Ammersee Railway to Weilheim. One curious aspect was the mode of operation on the non-electrified section from Geltendorf to Weilheim. A diesel engine was hooked up to the train in Geltendorf or Weilheim and the electric locomotive was hauled along with its pantographs lowered.

This gap in the electrified network still remains a stumbling block, because all trains on the Ammersee Railway are diesel-hauled, although there is now catenary between Geltendorf and Augsburg. This excludes the few trains that, until the end of 2008, used to run only between Geltendorf and Augsburg in the morning and evening and were therefore hauled by electrics. A closure of this gap in the electrified network is planned in the longer term.

The long waits at some of the crossing stations and irregular services meant that travel on the Ammersee Railway was not particularly attractive in the past. This has changed since 14 December 2008 with a new, tauter timetable. The variable interval services have been restricted to the Dießen-Weilheim section. On the rest of the line, as on the through services to Schongau and Augsburg-Oberhausen, a strict hourly service is offered.

Since 14 December 2008, running powers on the Ammersee Railway have been awarded to the Bayerische Regiobahn (BRB). The BRB is a sister company of the Bayerische Oberlandbahn (BOB) and belongs to the Veolia Group. The BRB operates the Weilheim–Peißenberg, Schongau–Peißenberg, and Augsburg–Geltendorf–Weilheim lines and, from 2009, has also worked the Augsburg–Aichach–Ingolstadt and Ingolstadt–Eichstätt Stadt routes.
