= Transdev Germany =

German transport company

- Formerly: Veolia Verkehr; Connex Verkehr; Aktiengesellschaft für Industrie und Verkehrswesen
- Industry: Public transport
- Headquarters: Berlin, Germany
- Owner: Transdev
- Subsidiaries: Bayerische Oberlandbahn; NordWestBahn (64%); RheinRuhrBahn; Transdev Sachsen-Anhalt; Württembergische Eisenbahn-Gesellschaft
- Website: www.transdev.de

Transdev Germany is the largest private operator of passenger buses and trains in Germany. It is a subsidiary of Transdev.

== History ==
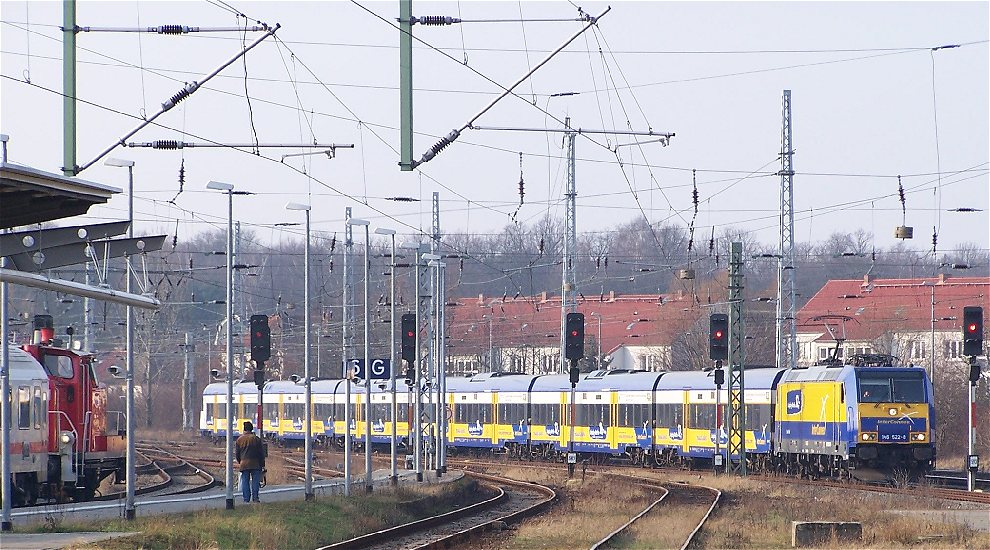
Interconnex Line 1 (Gera - Rostock) in 2007

In 1997, Aktiengesellschaft für Industrie und Verkehrswesen was purchased by a CGEA Group (60%) EnBW (40%) consortium. In 2000, CGEA bought EnBW's shares and rebranded the operation Connex Verkehr. in April 2006 it was rebranded as Veolia Verkehr, and following the merger of Transdev and Veolia Transport as Transdev in March 2015.

Transdev, as was the case with Veolia and Connex, operates dozens of subsidiaries, each with their own name. Most of them operate small, regional train and bus services.

== Rail services ==
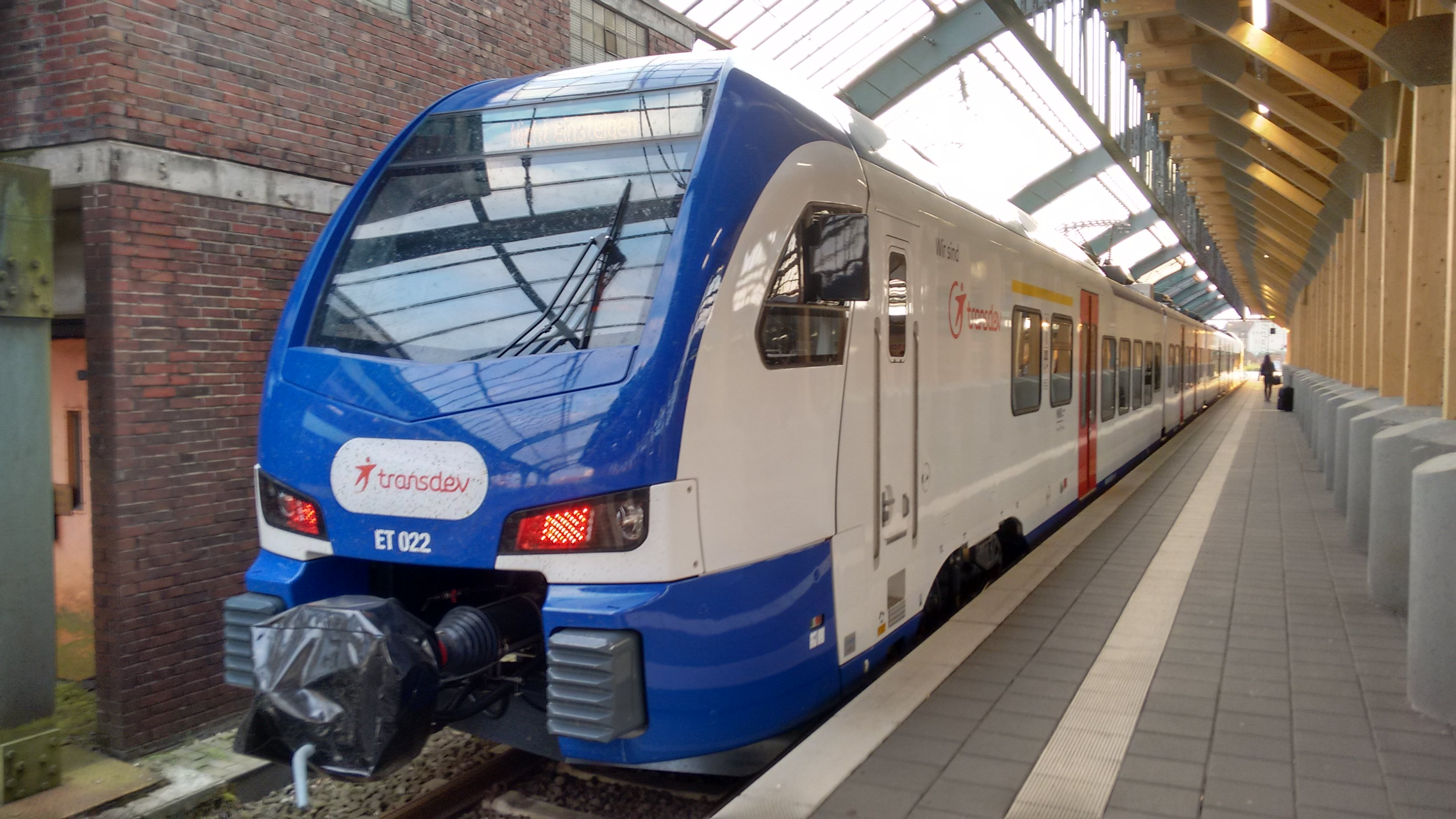
Flirt 3 of NordWestBahn in Oldenburg Hbf (2017)

Transdev subsidiaries operate the following services:

- Bayerische Oberlandbahn GmbH, Holzkirchen, and Bayerische Regiobahn GmbH, Augsburg, with these shared brands
  - BRB Oberland (formerly BOB),
  - BRB Chiemgau-Inntal (formerly Meridian),
  - BRB Ammersee-Altmühltal and
  - BRB Ostallgäu-Lechfeld
  - BRB Berchtesgaden-Ruhpolding
- NordWestBahn GmbH, Osnabrück
- Transdev Rhein-Ruhr GmbH, Duisburg with the brand
  - RheinRuhrBahn
- Transdev Hannover GmbH, Hannover
- Transdev Regio Ost GmbH, Leipzig, and Bayerische Oberlandbahn GmbH, Holzkirchen, with the shared brand
  - Mitteldeutsche Regiobahn
- Transdev Sachsen-Anhalt GmbH, Halberstadt
- Trans Regio Deutsche Regionalbahn GmbH, Koblenz (with the brand MRB Mittelrheinbahn)
- Württembergische Eisenbahn-Gesellschaft mbH (with the brand WEG), Waiblingen; it operates rail services on four lines
- Transdev Verkehr GmbH, Moers (evolved from Rhenus Veniro); it operates rail services on three lines
  - Freiberger Eisenbahn (Nossen–Moldava railway)
  - Hunsrückbahn
  - Moselwein-Bahn

== Other transport activities ==
Transdev’s German operations have been structured into four regions since April 2005.

=== North ===
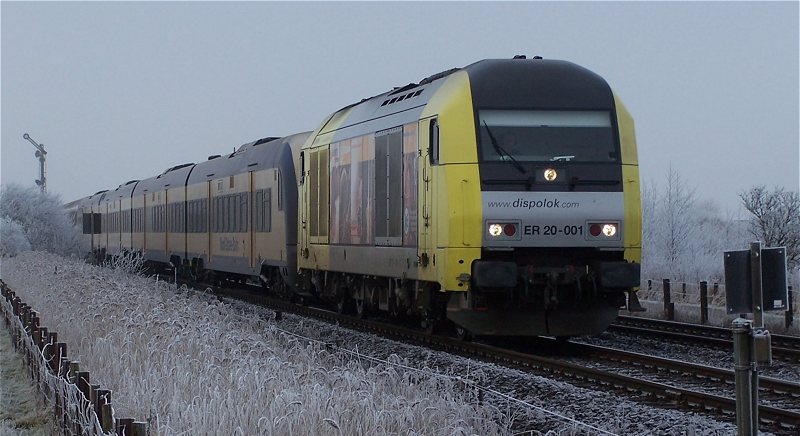
Nord-Ostsee-Bahn train between Hamburg and Sylt

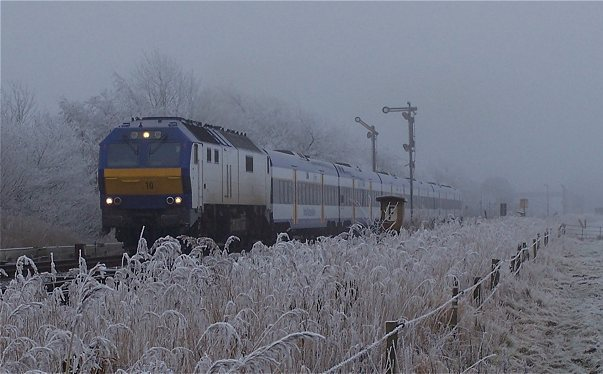
Nord-Ostsee-Bahn train between Hamburg and Sylt

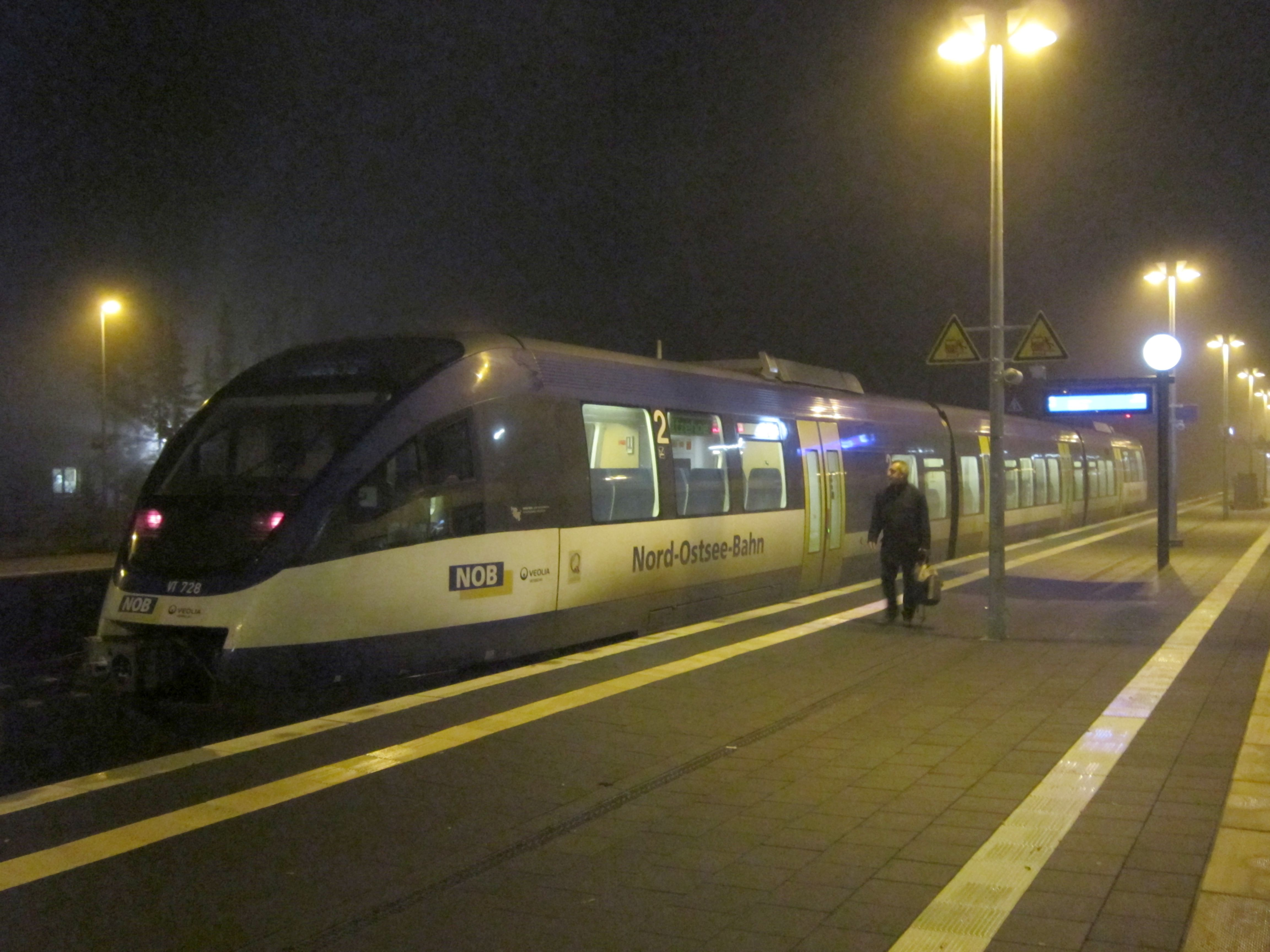
Nord-Ostsee-Bahn Bombardier Talent at Husum station

Region North includes the federal states of Hamburg and Schleswig-Holstein and a short line in Denmark. In this region, the Niebüller Verkehrsbetriebe (NVB) and the Nord-Ostsee-Bahn (NOB) operate:

- Niebüller Verkehrsbetriebe, a bus company operating ten bus lines with a length of about 530 km (about 330 miles). It has nineteen employees and carries about 680,000 passengers each year. Its main shareholder is the Nord-Ostsee-Bahn;
- Nord-Ostsee-Bahn has been operating a 237-kilometre-long (150 mi) railway service between the island of Sylt and Hamburg since December 12, 2005. The corporate name translates to North and Baltic Sea Railway. It was the first private train operator to offer such a long route. Nord-Ostsee-Bahn also operates the routes Kiel - Husum, Husum - Sankt Peter-Ording, Kiel - Neumünster (together with Deutsche Bahn), Niebüll - Tønder (Denmark) and the bus line Brunsbüttel - Glückstadt. They have more than 250 employees, run about 7.1 million km (4.4 million miles) per year, carry 7 million passengers each year and operate a railway network that is 431 km (270 miles) long.

It is planned to extend these trains from Hamburg on to Berlin and Cologne under the operation of "Ostseeland Verkehrs GmbH" (OLA), which runs all Veolia long-distance trains in Germany. Unlike the trains between Sylt and Hamburg, the trains from Hamburg to Berlin and Cologne are not subsidised by any State of Germany

=== East ===
(Berlin, Brandenburg, Mecklenburg-Vorpommern, Saxony, Saxony-Anhalt and Thuringia)

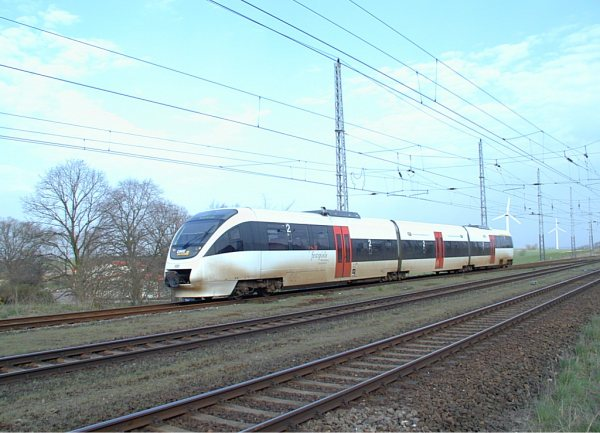
OME/OLA Bombardier Talent

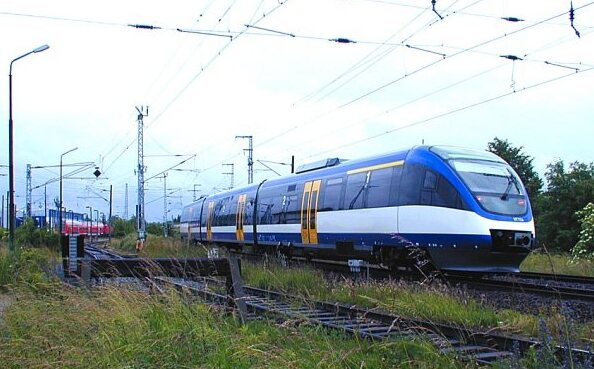
OME/OLA Bombardier Talent

- SaxBus Eilenburger Busverkehr: urban bus lines
- Transdev Sachsen-Anhalt
- Transdev Regio Ost(formerly: Veolia Verkehr Regio Ost and Connex Sachsen)
- Niederschlesische Verkehrs-Gesellschaft
- Ostseelandverkehr (OLA): the result of a merger between Ostmecklenburgische Eisenbahngesellschaft mbH (OME) and MecklenburgBahn (MeBa)
- Schöneicher-Rüdersdorfer Straßenbahn GmbH: Tram line linking Berlin suburbs to Friedrichshagen S-Bahn station
- Taeter Tours (Dresden)
- Verkehrsgesellschaft Görlitz, urban network of 2 tram lines

=== West ===
(Bremen, Hesse, Lower Saxony, North Rhine-Westphalia, Rhineland-Palatinate and Saarland)

- Alpina Bad Homburg GmbH
- Alpina Limburg GmbH & Co KG
- Alpina Rhein-Main GmbH & Co KG
- Düren trans GmbH
- Farge-Vegesacker Eisenbahn (FVE), (Bremen)
- Habus Verkehrsbetriebe (Hagen): urban bus lines
- Nassauische Verkehrs-Gesellschaft
- NordWestBahn (NWB)
  - Transdev Hannover
- PalatinaBus (Edenkoben)
- RegioBus Gütersloh
- Rheinisch-Bergische Eisenbahn (RBE) (Mettmann)
- Stadtbus Bad Kreuznach (SBK)
- Stadtbus Zweibrücken (SBZ)
- Schaumburger Verkehrs-Gesellschaft
- TAETER GmbH & Co KG (Aachen)
- Teutoburger Wald Eisenbahn-Gesellschaft (TWE), (Gütersloh)

- TWE-Busverkehrs

- Transdev Hannover GmbH
- Verkehrsgesellschaft Idar-Oberstein (VIO)
- INGmobil (Ingelheim am Rhein)

=== South ===
(Baden-Württemberg and Bavaria)

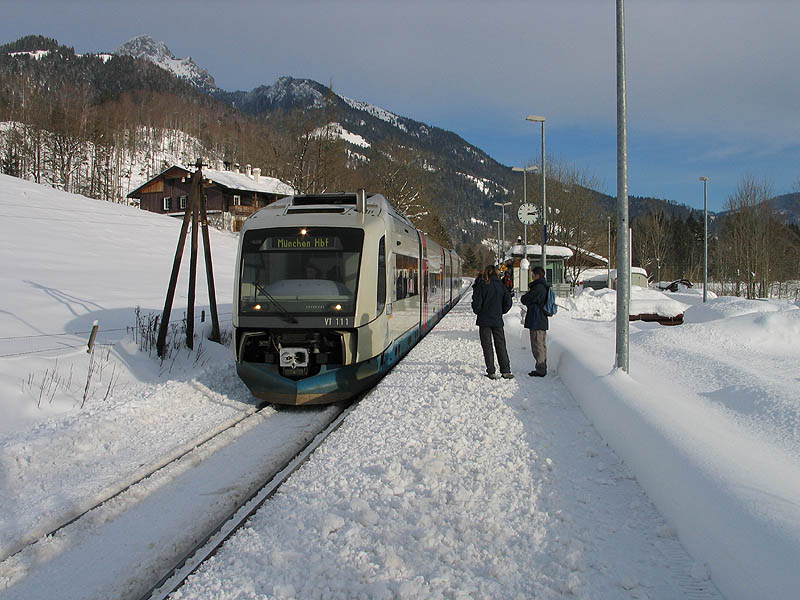
Bayerische Oberlandbahn train

- Bayerische Oberlandbahn (BOB)
- Bayerische Regiobahn (BRB), Holzkirchen and Augsburg
- J.P. Griensteidl (Gröbenzell)
- Heidenheimer Verkehrsgesellschaft mbH,
- Omnibus-Verkehr Ruoff (Waiblingen)
- Stadtbus Schwäbisch Hall: urban bus lines
- Stadtverkehr Pforzheim GmbH & Co. KG (SVP), urban bus lines
- Württembergische Eisenbahn-Gesellschaft mbH (WEG), (Waiblingen): regional trains

=== Operations absorbed from old Transdev ===
In addition to the above operations, Transdev also operates buses that were formerly part of the old Transdev.

- Ahrweiler Verkehrsgesellschaft, Brohl-Lützing
- Mittelrheinischer Verkehrsbetrieb, Neuwied
- Verkehrsbetrieb Lahn-Dill, Limburg
- Verkehrsbetrieb Rhein Eifel Mosel, Neuwied
- Verkehrsbetrieb Rhein Lahn, Bogel
- Verkehrsbetrieb Rhein Westerwald, Puderbach

== Former long distance rail operations ==
From 2001 to 2014, Transdev (known at the time as Veolia) ran a number of long distance trains:

=== InterConnex ===
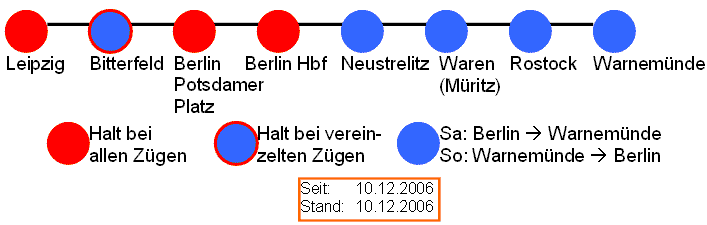
Plan of the InterConnex 1

The Interconnex ran between Leipzig and Berlin, up to three times each way, Monday to Friday. On Saturdays, the train ran from Leipzig to Rostock via Berlin and back on Sunday. The locomotives and carriages were provided by the Nord-Ostsee-Bahn. It commenced on 1 March 2002 as the first open access operator in Germany.

Previously, the service was run all the way between Rostock - Berlin - Leipzig - Gera using Bombardier Talent diesel multiple units. This service commenced in December 2001 under the flag of Ostseeland Verkeher Since those trains were constructed for regional use, longer journeys were quite unpleasant. Only later were they fitted with more comfortable long distance seats. From the beginning on they had a BoardBistro. This train was conceptualized as a compensation for the cancelled Deutsche Bahn trains between Rostock and Leipzig. The trains offered three classes: Traveler, Economy and Business. Each of them with a different kind of service. These classes disappeared in May 2006, when the train service was shortened to Leipzig - Berlin.

There was a period of transition for this service between May and December 2006. During this period, a shuttle train ran between Gera and Leipzig consisting of a Siemens Desiro diesel multiple unit. In this period, the train service already ran twice a day only between Leipzig and Berlin, stopping at Berlin Potsdamer Platz (and some trains also at Bitterfeld). On Saturdays the train went all the way to Warnemünde via Neustrelitz, Waren and Rostock, making the return trip on Sundays. On Sundays it drove back from Warnemünde to Berlin and further to Leipzig. This service ceased on 13 December 2014.

=== Harz-Berlin-Express ===
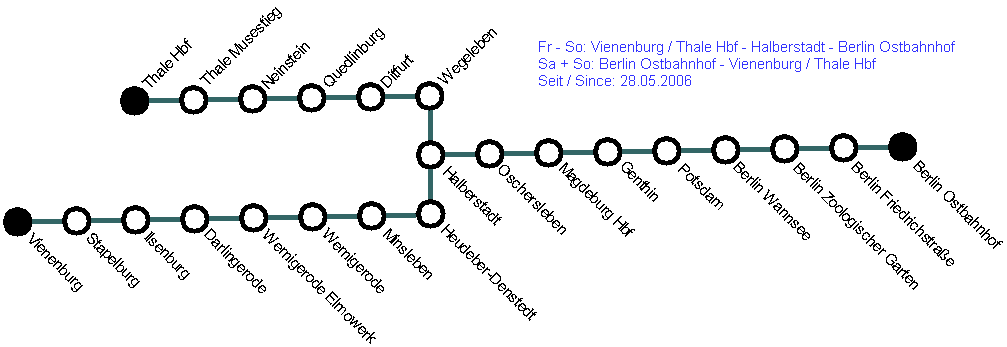
Plan of the Harz-Berlin-Express

Since December 2005, Veolia subcontractor HarzElbeExpress (HEX) has been operating the Harz-Berlin-Express from Berlin via the lines to Magdeburg and Halberstadt to Thale in the Harz on weekends. This route was previously operated by Deutsche Bahn.

=== InterConnex 2/Ostseeland Express ===
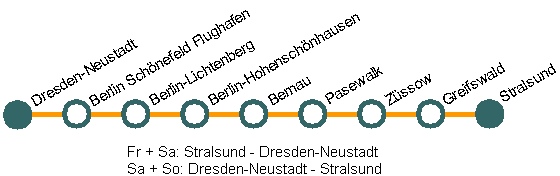
Plan of the Ostseeland Express

Interconnex 2, which was officially called the Ostseeland Express (OLX) since December 2005, ran between Stralsund, Berlin and Dresden. It came into operation in December 2004, starting at first at Zittau and then running via Berlin to Stralsund, with a summer extension to Rügen. In the summer of 2004, it was even extended at the Zittau side all the way to Liberec in the Czech Republic. Shuttle buses operated from Dresden and Usedom. However, at the timetable modification of December 2004, the route was changed to a shorter stretch. It was abandoned in late 2006.

=== InterConnex 3 ===
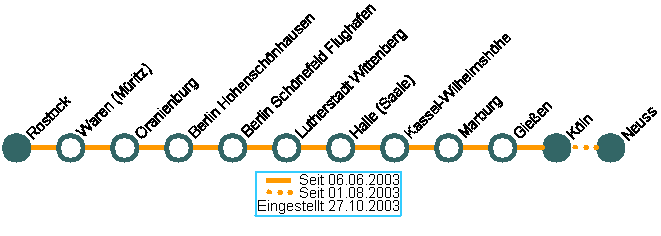
Plan of the InterConnex 3

A third line between Rostock and Cologne ran between 6 June and 27 October 2003.

== Freight trains ==
In January 2002, Connex Cargo Logistics commenced operating freight services. In 2009 it was sold to SNCF.
