= Hohenpeißenberg station =

Railway station in Bavaria

Hohenpeißenberg
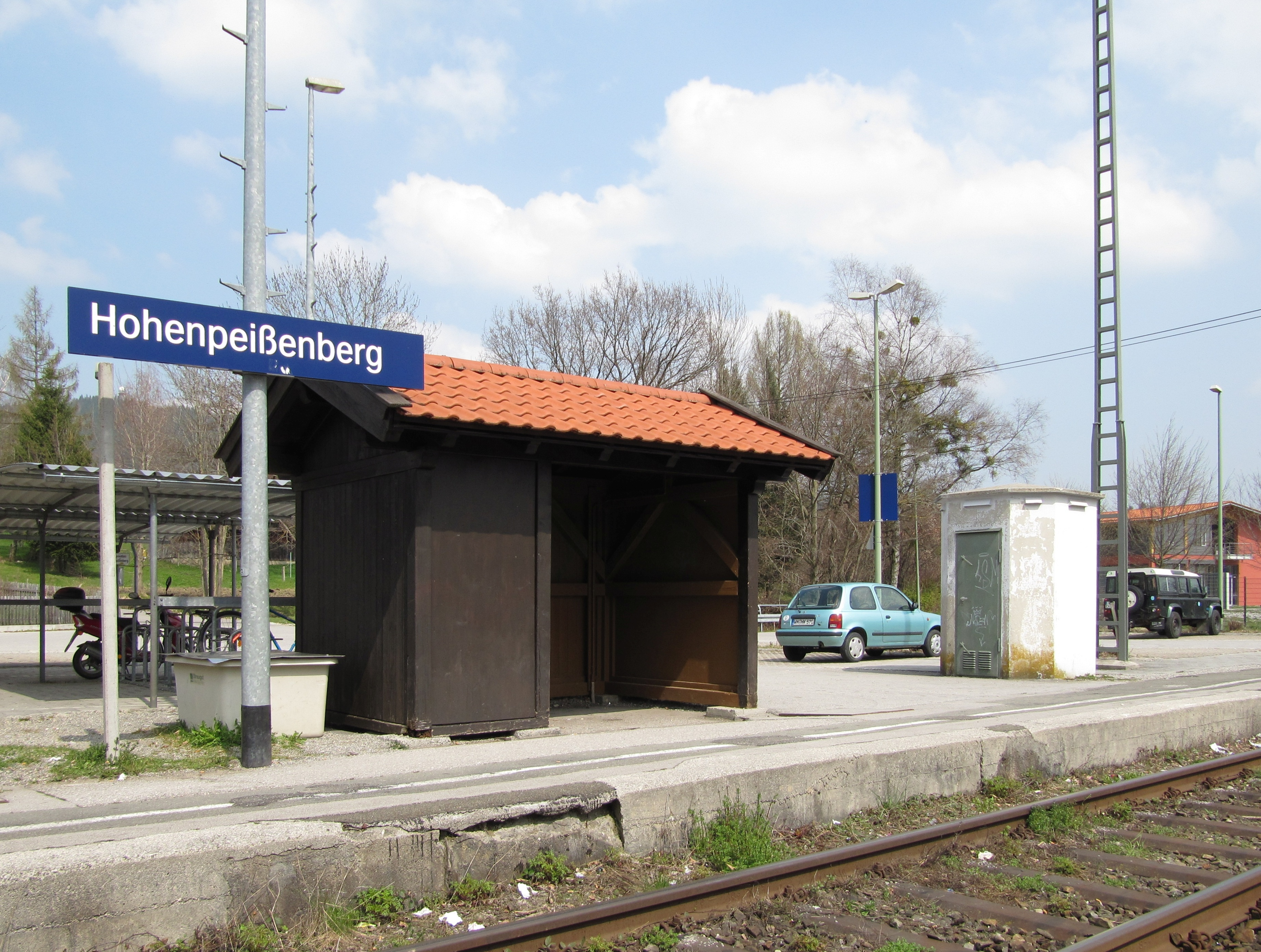
- The station platform in 2010

General information
- Location: Hohenpeißenberg, Bavaria; Germany
- Coordinates: 47°47′20″N 10°59′57″E
- Owner: DB Netz
- Operator: DB Station&Service
- Lines: Schongau–Peißenberg line (KBS 962)
- Distance: 9.3 km (5.8 mi) from Schongau
- Platforms: 1 side platform
- Tracks: 1
- Train operators: Bayerische Regiobahn
- Connections: Regionalverkehr Oberbayern buses

Other information
- Station code: 2856
- DS100 code: MHPG
- IBNR: 8002954
- Category: 6

Services
Preceding station		Following station
Peißenberg towards Augsburg-Oberhausen	RB 67	Peiting Ost towards Schongau
Location

Hohenpeißenberg station (German: Haltepunkt Hohenpeißenberg) is a railway station in the municipality of Hohenpeißenberg, in Bavaria, Germany. It is located on the Schongau–Peißenberg line of Deutsche Bahn.

== Services ==
As of the December 2021 timetable change, the following services stop at Hohenpeißenberg:

- RB: hourly service between Schongau and Weilheim (Oberbay); some trains continue from Weilheim to Augsburg-Oberhausen.
