= Peiting Ost station =

Railway station in Bavaria

Peiting Ost
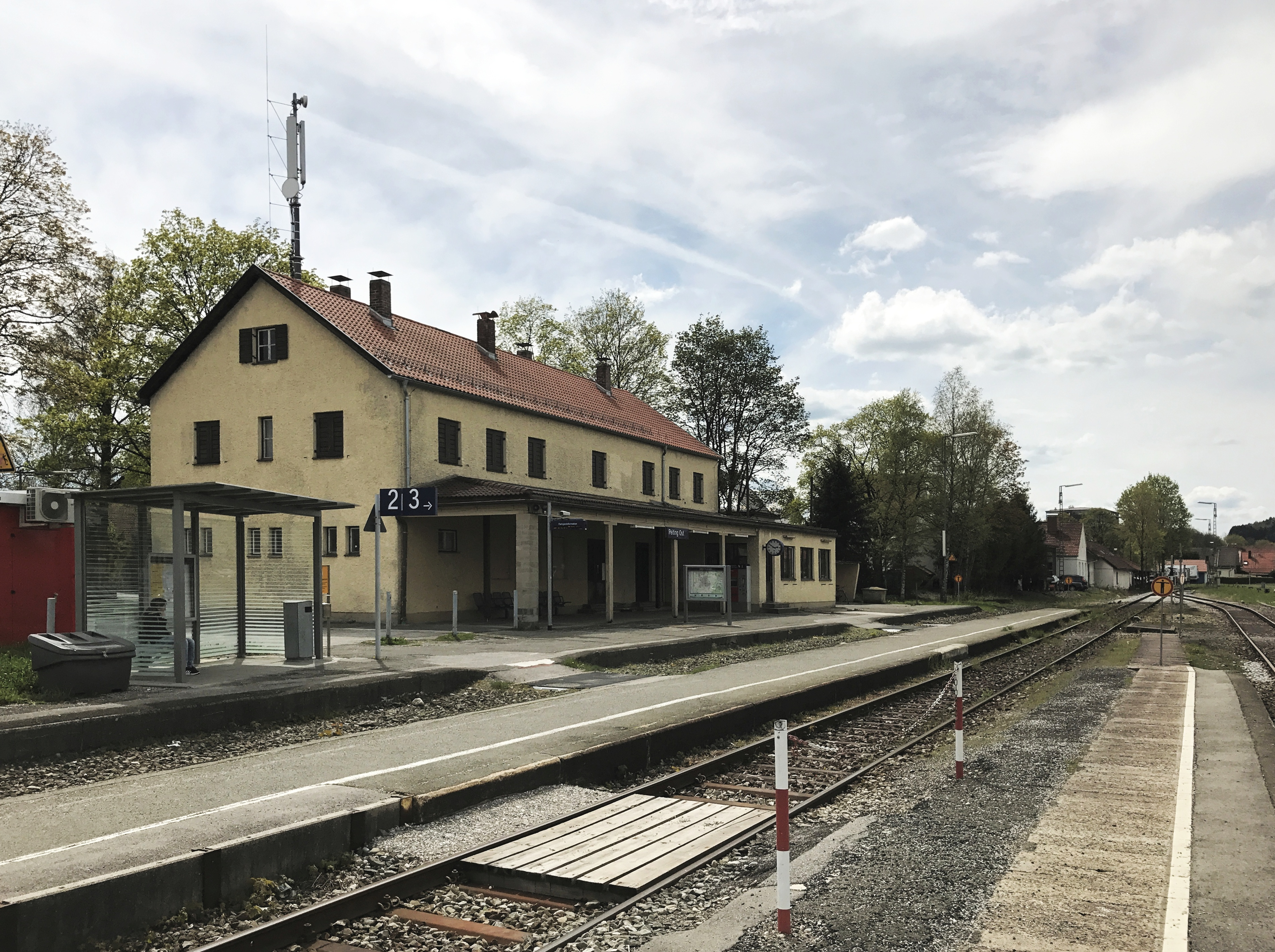
- The station in 2017

General information
- Location: Peiting, Bavaria; Germany
- Coordinates: 47°47′35″N 10°56′12″E
- Owner: DB Netz
- Operator: DB Station&Service
- Lines: Schongau–Peißenberg line (KBS 962)
- Distance: 4.2 km (2.6 mi) from Schongau
- Platforms: 1 island platform
- Tracks: 2
- Train operators: Bayerische Regiobahn
- Connections: Regionalverkehr Oberbayern buses

Other information
- Station code: 4891
- DS100 code: MPTO
- IBNR: 8004765
- Category: 6

Services
Preceding station		Following station
Hohenpeißenberg towards Augsburg-Oberhausen	RB 67	Peiting Nord towards Schongau
Location

Peiting Ost station (German: Haltepunkt Peiting Ost) is a railway station in the municipality of Peiting, in Bavaria, Germany. It is located on the Schongau–Peißenberg line of Deutsche Bahn.

== Services ==
As of the December 2021 timetable change, the following services stop at Peiting Ost:

- RB: hourly service between Schongau and Weilheim (Oberbay); some trains continue from Weilheim to Augsburg-Oberhausen.
