= Peißenberg Nord station =

Railway station in Bavaria

Peißenberg Nord
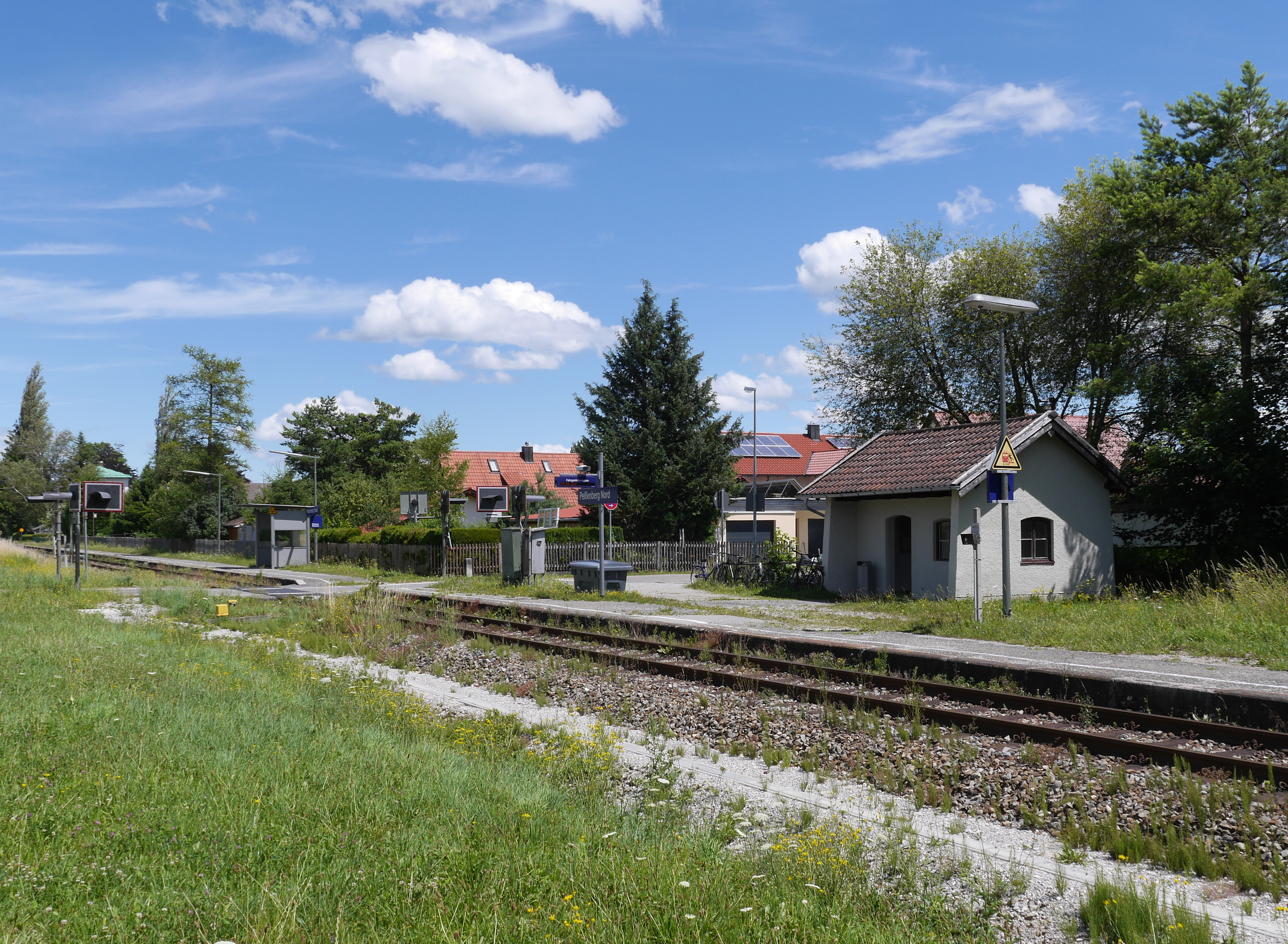
- The station in 2017

General information
- Location: Peißenberg, Bavaria; Germany
- Coordinates: 47°48′57″N 11°04′38″E
- Owner: DB Netz
- Operator: DB Station&Service
- Lines: Weilheim–Peißenberg line (KBS 962)
- Distance: 6.5 km (4.0 mi) from Weilheim (Oberbay)
- Platforms: 1 side platform
- Tracks: 1
- Train operators: Bayerische Regiobahn

Other information
- Station code: 4889
- DS100 code: MPBN
- IBNR: 8004763
- Category: 6

Services
Preceding station		Following station
Weilheim (Oberbay) towards Augsburg-Oberhausen	RB 67	Peißenberg towards Schongau
Location

Peißenberg Nord station (German: Haltepunkt Peißenberg Nord) is a railway station in the municipality of Peißenberg, in Bavaria, Germany. It is located on the Weilheim–Peißenberg line of Deutsche Bahn.

== Services ==
As of the December 2021 timetable change, the following services stop at Peißenberg Nord:

- RB: hourly service between Schongau and Weilheim (Oberbay); some trains continue from Weilheim to Augsburg-Oberhausen.
