= Peiting =

- Municipality
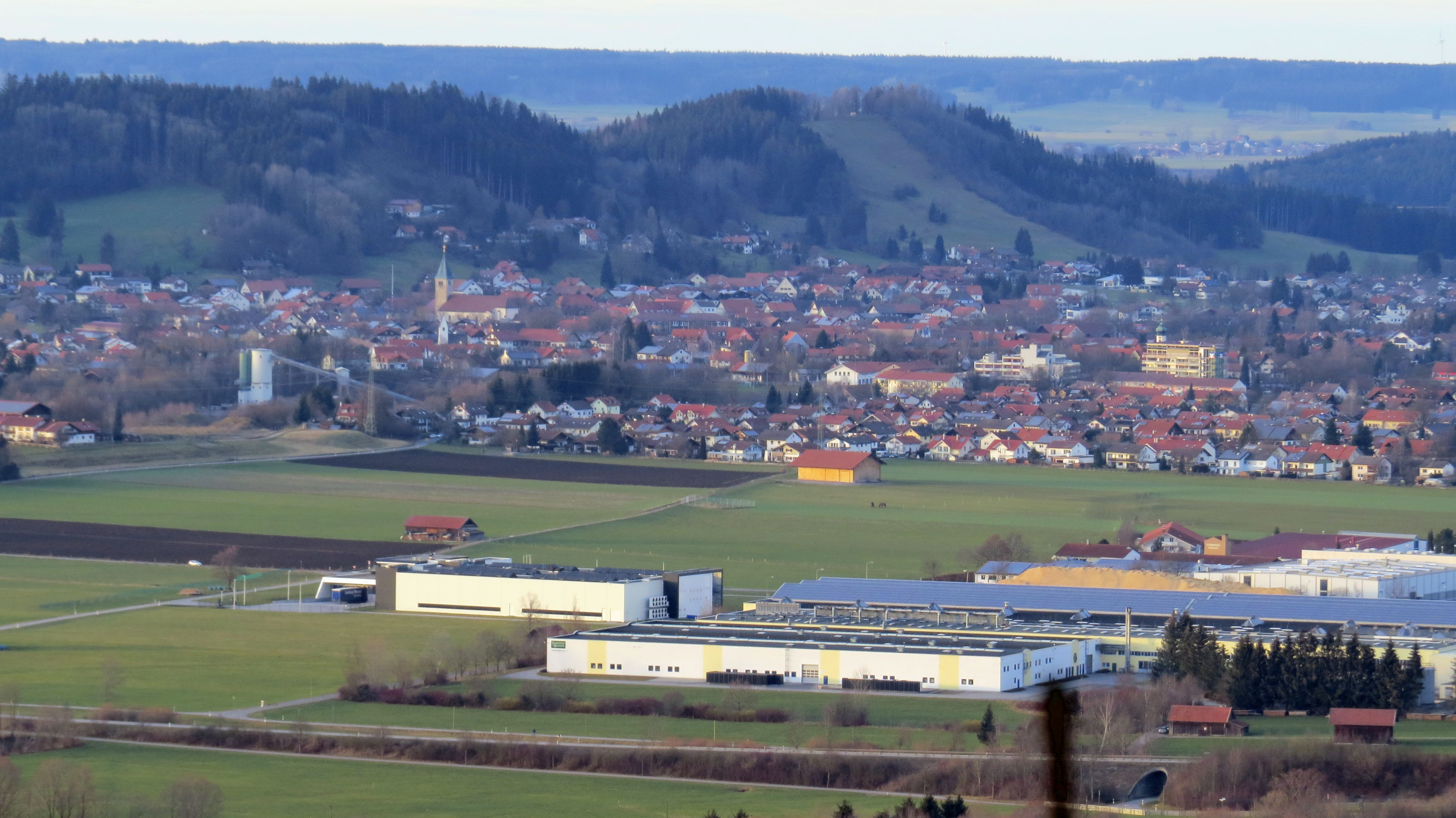
- Peiting seen from the southeast

- Coat of arms

- Location of Peiting within Weilheim-Schongau district
- Interactive map of Peiting
- Location within Germany Location within Bavaria
- Coordinates: 47°48′N 10°56′E
- Country: Germany
- State: Bavaria
- Admin. region: Upper Bavaria
- District: Weilheim-Schongau

Government
  - Mayor (2020–26): Peter Ostenrieder (CSU)

Area
  - Total: 75.13 km^{2} (29.01 sq mi)
- Elevation: 718 m (2,356 ft)

Population (2025-12-31)
  - Total: 11,773
  - Density: 156.7/km^{2} (405.9/sq mi)
- Time zone: UTC+01:00 (CET)
  - Summer (DST): UTC+02:00 (CEST)
- Postal codes: 86971
- Dialling codes: 08861
- Vehicle registration: WM, SOG
- Website: www.peiting.de

Peiting (German pronunciation: [ˈpaɪtɪŋ]) is a municipality in the Weilheim-Schongau district, in Bavaria, Germany. It is situated on the right bank of the Lech, 3 km southeast of Schongau, and 17 km west of Weilheim in Oberbayern.

== Transport ==
The municipality has two railway stations, Peiting Nord and Peiting Ost. Both are located on the Schongau–Peißenberg line.

== Notable people ==
- Placidus Braun, Benedictine priest, historian and archivist
- Martin Echtler, ski mountaineer
- Erwin Kreuz, tourist who mistook Bangor, Maine for San Francisco
