= Peiting Nord station =

Railway station in Bavaria

Peiting Nord
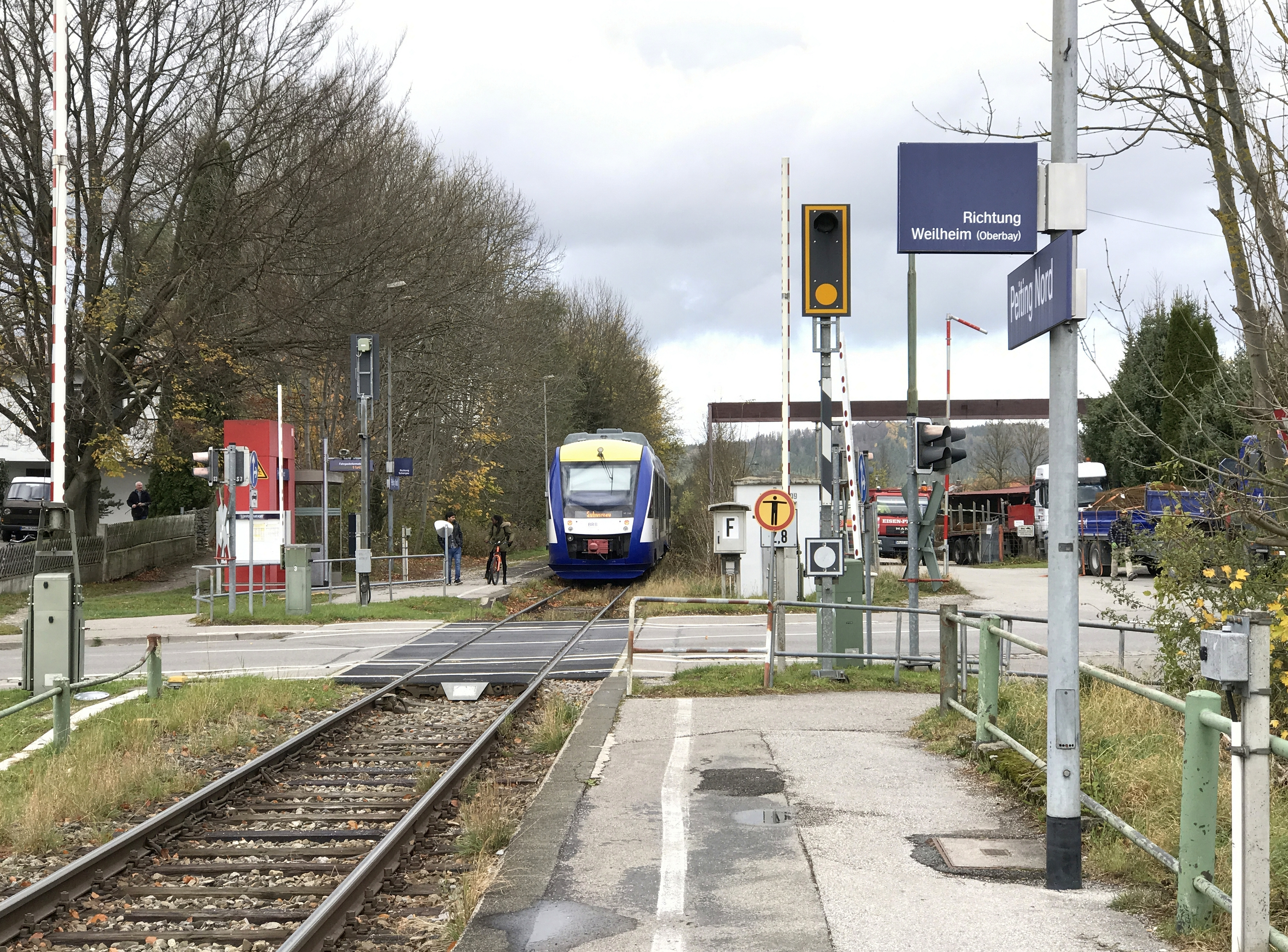
- A train at the station in 2017

General information
- Location: Peiting, Bavaria; Germany
- Coordinates: 47°48′06″N 10°55′36″E
- Owner: DB Netz
- Operator: DB Station&Service
- Lines: Schongau–Peißenberg line (KBS 962)
- Distance: 2.8 km (1.7 mi) from Schongau
- Platforms: 1 side platform
- Tracks: 1
- Train operators: Bayerische Regiobahn

Other information
- Station code: 4890
- DS100 code: MPTN
- IBNR: 8004764
- Category: 6

Services
| Preceding station | | Following station |
|---|---|---|
| Peiting Ost towards Augsburg-Oberhausen | RB 67 | Schongau Terminus |
Location

Peiting Nord station (German: Haltepunkt Peiting Nord) is a railway station in the municipality of Peiting, in Bavaria, Germany. It is located on the Schongau–Peißenberg line of Deutsche Bahn.

== Services ==
As of the December 2021 timetable change, the following services stop at Peiting Nord:

- RB: hourly service between Schongau and Weilheim (Oberbay); some trains continue from Weilheim to Augsburg-Oberhausen.
