= Peißenberg station =

Railway station in Bavaria

Peißenberg
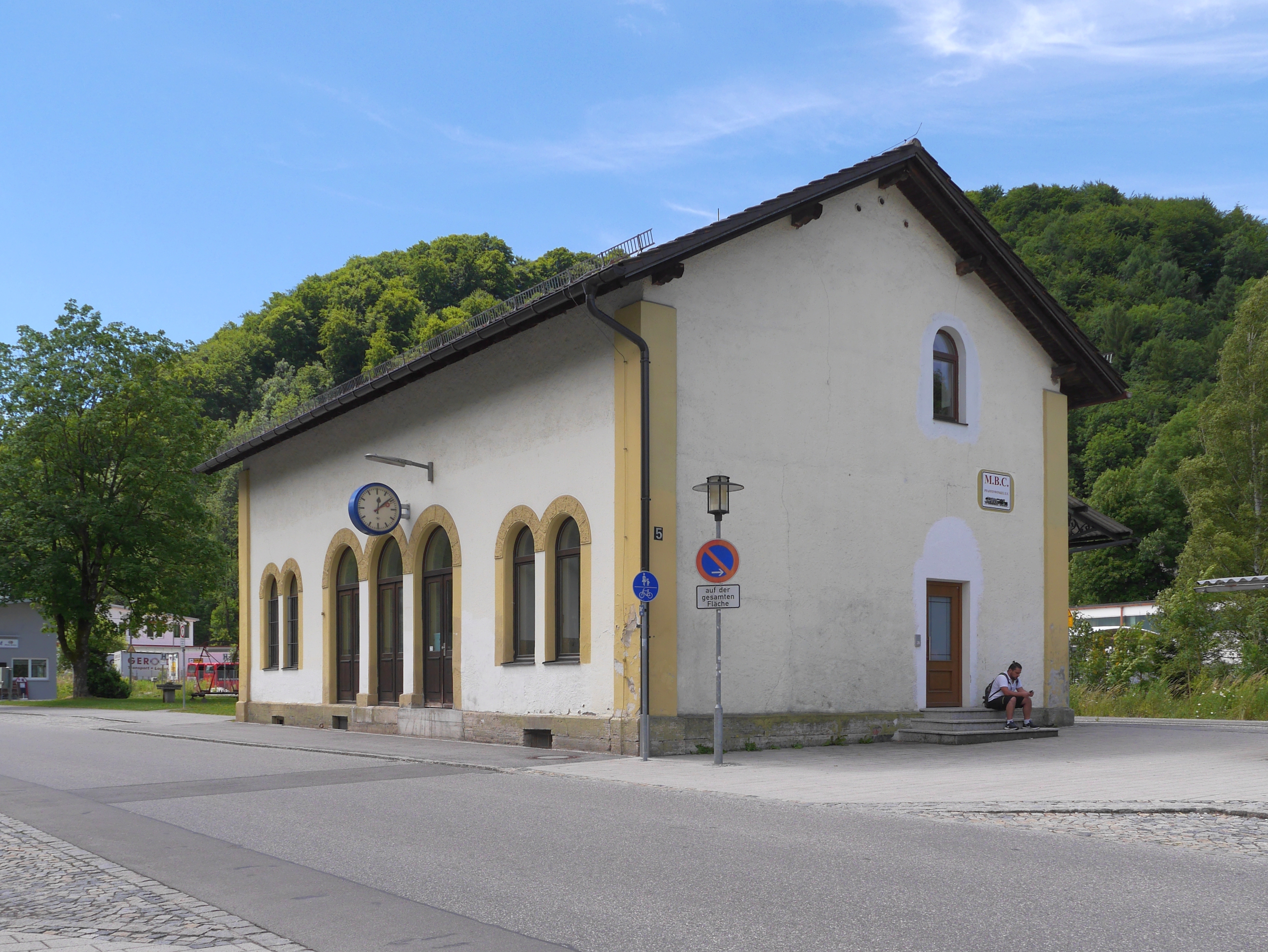
- The station building in 2017

General information
- Location: Peißenberg, Bavaria; Germany
- Coordinates: 47°48′N 11°04′E
- Owner: DB Netz
- Operator: DB Station&Service
- Lines: Schongau–Peißenberg line (KBS 962); Weilheim–Peißenberg line (KBS 962)
- Distance: 8.9 km (5.5 mi) from Weilheim (Oberbay); 15.5 km (9.6 mi) from Schongau
- Platforms: 1 island platform
- Tracks: 2
- Train operators: Bayerische Regiobahn
- Connections: Regionalverkehr Oberbayern buses

Other information
- Station code: 4888
- DS100 code: MPBG
- IBNR: 8004762
- Category: 6

History
- Opened: 1 August 1875; 151 years ago
- Electrified: 1 May 1925; 101 years ago 1982 de-electrified
- Former names: 1875–1880: Bergwerk Peißenberg

Services
Preceding station		Following station
Peißenberg Nord towards Augsburg-Oberhausen	RB 67	Hohenpeißenberg towards Schongau
Location

Peißenberg station (German: Bahnhof Peißenberg) is a railway station in the municipality of Peißenberg, in Bavaria, Germany. It is located at junction of the Schongau–Peißenberg and Weilheim–Peißenberg lines of Deutsche Bahn.

== Services ==
As of the December 2021 timetable change, the following services stop at Peißenberg:

- RB: hourly service between Schongau and Weilheim (Oberbay); some trains continue from Weilheim to Augsburg-Oberhausen.
