= Weilheim in Oberbayern =

- Town
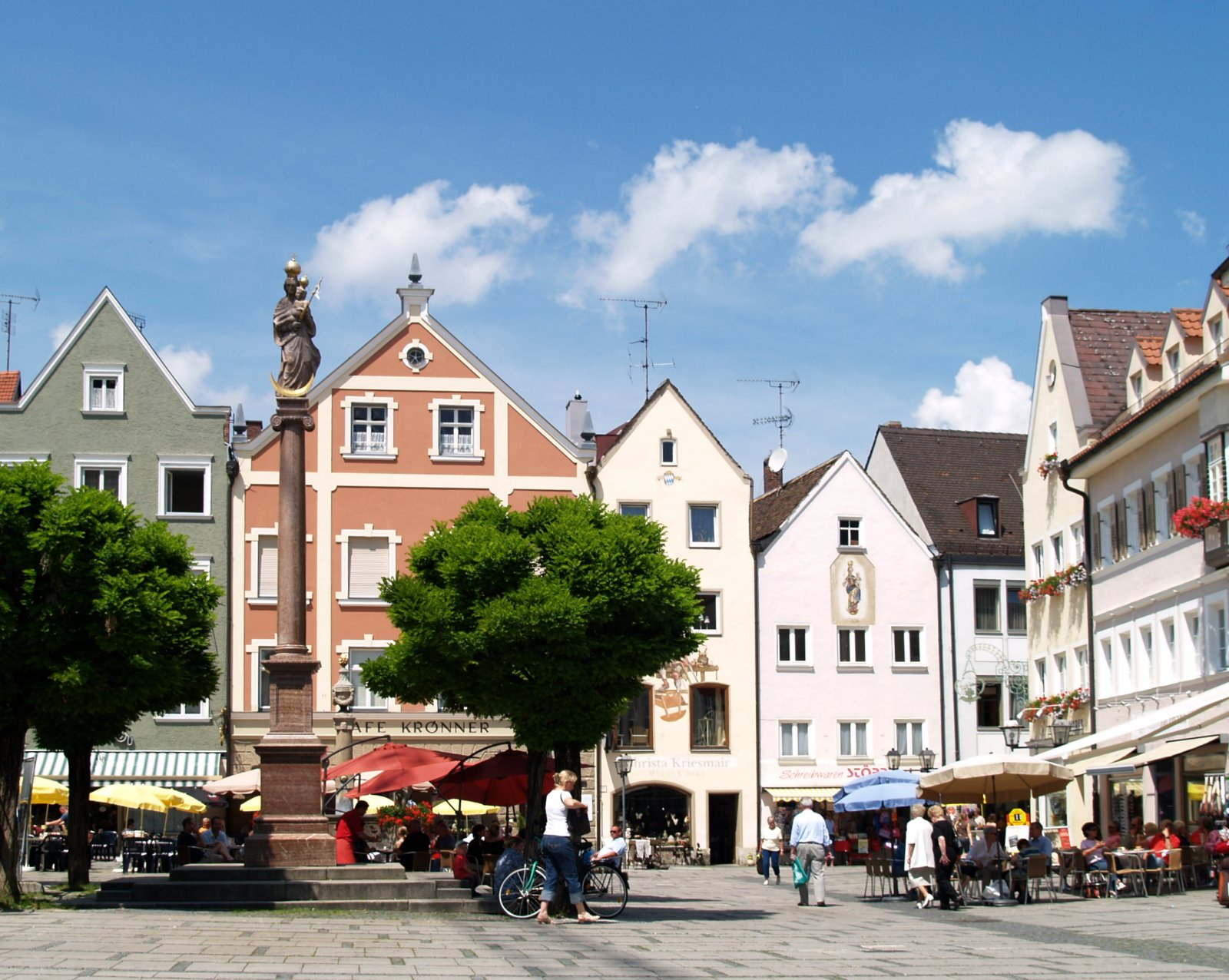
- Pedestrian zone in Weilheim

- Flag Coat of arms

- Location of Weilheim in Oberbayern within Weilheim-Schongau district
- Interactive map of Weilheim in Oberbayern
- Location within Germany Location within Bavaria
- Coordinates: 47°50′N 11°09′E
- Country: Germany
- State: Bavaria
- Admin. region: Upper Bavaria
- District: Weilheim-Schongau

Government
  - Mayor (2026–32): Tillman Wahlefeld (Bürger für Weilheim)

Area
  - Total: 55.5 km^{2} (21.4 sq mi)
- Elevation: 563 m (1,847 ft)

Population (2025-12-31)
  - Total: 23,406
  - Density: 422/km^{2} (1,090/sq mi)
- Time zone: UTC+01:00 (CET)
  - Summer (DST): UTC+02:00 (CEST)
- Postal codes: 82362
- Dialling codes: 0881
- Vehicle registration: WM
- Website: www.weilheim.de

Weilheim in Oberbayern (German pronunciation: [ˈvaɪlhaɪm ʔɪn ˈʔoːbɐˌbaɪɐn], lit. 'Weilheim in Upper Bavaria'; officially Weilheim i.OB) is a town in Germany, the capital of the district Weilheim-Schongau in the south of Bavaria. Weilheim has an old city-wall, historic houses and a museum.

== Geography & Geomorphology ==
=== Geography ===
The town is located in the landscape of the Alpine Foreland between Munich to the north and Garmisch-Partenkirchen to the south. The Ammer flows through the town.

Weilheim lies in a basin that was carved out by repeated advances of the Isar-Loisach Glacier over the past 2.6 million years. The glacier was also responsible for the formation of the Ammersee, which was once significantly larger and extended southward as far as Weilheim.

=== Geomorphology ===
In particular, the glacial advance during the Würm glaciation, which began 115,000 years ago and ended about 10,000 years ago, has strongly shaped the current landscape of the region. For example, the “Gögerl” south of Weilheim was formed when the glacier, during its retreat about 18,000 years ago near Weilheim, deposited debris and rocks along its flanks for several hundred years (lateral moraine).

The Weilheimer Moos (the "Weilheim wetland"), was formed (similar to the Murnau wetland) by sand and clay particles that were deposited by the Ur-Ammer River into the eroded, water-filled basin after the glacier melted. While the Ammersee became increasingly silted up as a result of this deposition, the lake sediments still prevent surface water from seeping away today, thus creating the foundation for the lowland bog area known as the Weilheimer Moos.

== Local history ==
=== Up to the 18th century ===
The oldest traces of human settlement date back to the Bronze Age and there were grave finds from the Late Roman era. The name Weilheim is interpreted as a home to the Roman villas (land estates). There are, however, several other theories for the roots of the name. Upper Bavaria came in Roman hands through commander Drusus. The Romans built "Via Raetia" in 200 AD, which led over the Brenner Pass to Augsburg. This Roman road ran through the Weilheim area. Around 476 AD, the Romans withdrew southwards and the Bavarians came into the region.

The first documentary mention of the village "Wilhain" dates from 16 April 1010 of the king and later Emperor Heinrich II of Bamberg, who granted the monastery of Polling the property of a farm in Weilheim in 1010. From about 1080 onwards nobleman of Weilheim appeared, they were vassals from Andechs-Meranier and disappeared around 1312. From 1236, there was a palisade fence as a precursor to the town wall. Around 1328, the Munich patrician Ludwig Pütrich enabled the establishment of the Heiliggeistspital (lit.: Holy Spirit Hospital) outside the town walls through donations. An award of the town is named after him. In the Middle Ages, there were several big fires in Weilheim. When a plague epidemic broke out in Munich in 1521, the Bavarian dukes Wilhelm IV and Ludwig temporarily resided in Weilheim. Early in the 17th century, artwork flourished in Weilheim, especially the Weilheimer sculpture school. Well-known representatives from this time were Georg Petel, Hans Krumpper, and Johann Sebastian Degler. In 1611, the so-called Trifthof was set up at the Ammer for log drifting, where tree trunks were bond together as rafts to carry them along the waterway down to the Amper. In 1639, the Franciscan monastery of St. Joseph was founded at the Schmied Gate because of a lack of priests .

=== 19th and 20th century ===
The Franciscan monastery in Weilheim was abolished as a result of the secularisation in 1802. 120 houses burnt down and two people were killed in a severe fire disaster in the Oberen Stadt (lit.: upper town) on 3 May 1810. The former Franciscan monastery burnt down in 1825, after which a Heiliggeistspital was built and a hospital on today's Münchner Straße in 1826. On 1 October 1869, the first daily newspaper was published, the "Weilheimer Tagblatt". Between 1872 and 1874, three city gates were demolished, the Obere Tor in 1872, the Schmied Gate in 1873, and the Pöltner Gate in 1874. 24 people were killed and the train station was destroyed by an air raid in the Second World War on 19 April 1945.

== Economy ==
Weilheim has low unemployment thanks to several medium-sized companies headquartered there. Among them is Bremicker Verkehrstechnik, a major manufacturer of traffic signs. WTW Wissenschaftlich-Technische Werkstätten GmbH is also based in Weilheim and is a global manufacturer of water analysis products. The company now belongs to Xylem Inc.. Zarges is a light-metal engineering company that specializes in manufacturing aluminum products for access technology (ladders and scaffolding), logistics, and custom packaging. While Zarges was founded in Stuttgart in 1933, the company relocated to Weilheim in 1939. The Dachsbräu, founded 1879, is Weilheim's last brewery.

In Lichtenau, 3.5 km southwest of the Raisting Earth Station, lies the Weilheim satellite ground station of the German Aerospace Center.

== Sport ==
The aeroclub Weilheim-Peißenberg flying at Paterzell airfield is rather successful in glider aerobatics: 2006 German National Champion Markus Feyerabend and Hans-Georg Resch are members of the German national glider aerobatics team.

== Transport ==
The Weilheim (Oberbay) station has five platform tracks and is served by about 100 trains daily. It is a crossing station on the Munich–Garmisch-Partenkirchen railway, the Ammersee Railway from Augsburg and the Weilheim–Peißenberg railway. It is classified by Deutsche Bahn as a category 4 station.

== Notable people ==
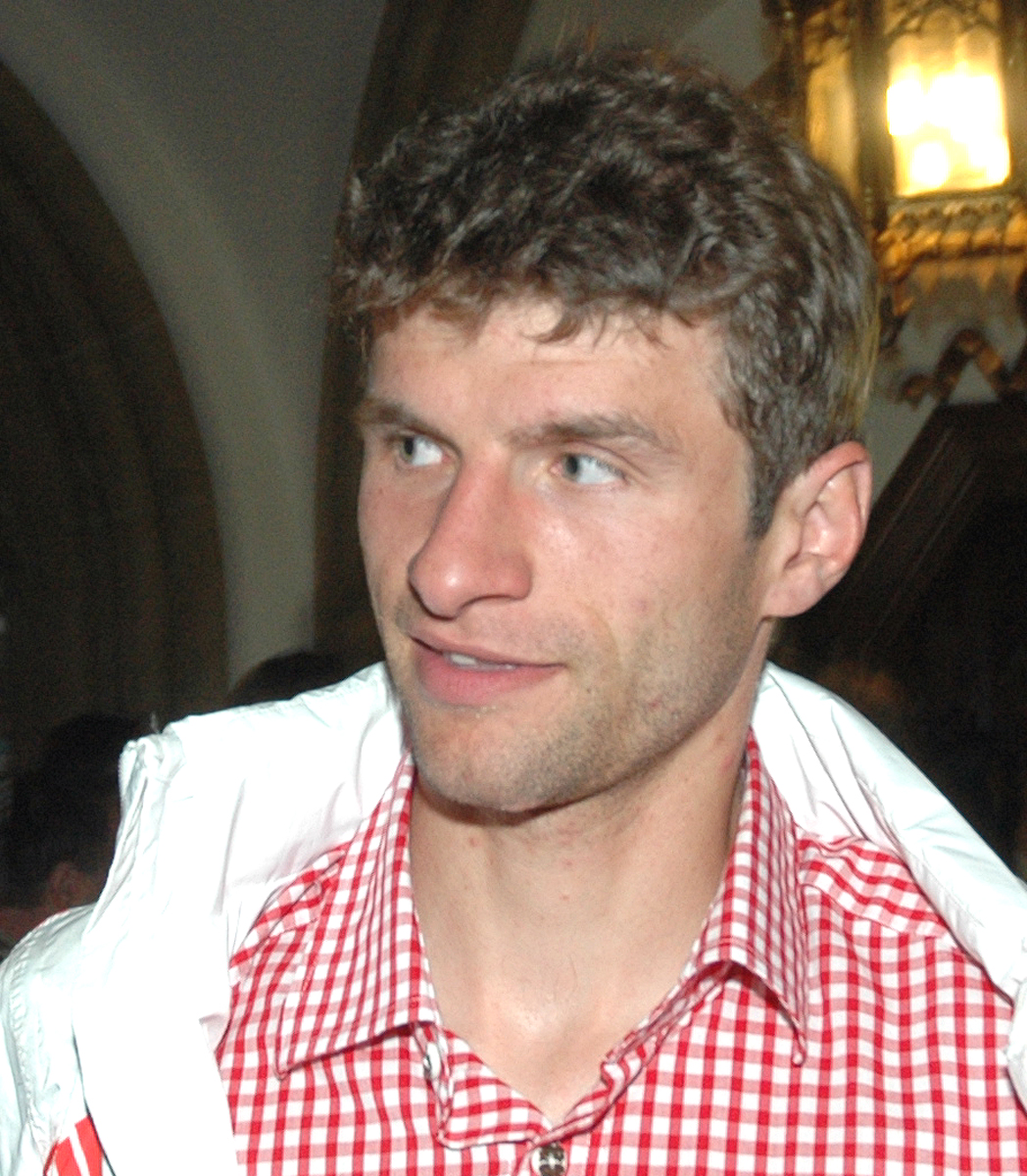
Vancouver Whitecaps footballer Thomas Müller, formerly of FC Bayern Munich and Germany national team, in 2013

- Markus Acher (born 1967), singer, guitarist and composer
- John Aelbl (born 1552), theologian
- Dominik Bittner (born 1995), ice hockey player
- Franz von Hipper (1863–1932), naval officer, last admiral in the Imperial German Navy in World War I
- Michael Holm (born 1943), lives and works in Weilheim; musician and singer
- Hans Krumpper (c. 1570–1634), Sculptor, plasterer
- Thomas Müller (born 1989), footballer for Vancouver Whitecaps, Bayern Munich and Germany, was born in Weilheim
- Max Nagl (born 1987), motocross biker
- Georg Petel (died 1635), sculptor who became known as German Michelangelo in the 18th century, was born in 1601 or 1602 in Weilheim
- Wilhelm Röntgen (1845–1923), had a mansion in Weilheim and is an honorary citizen
- Willi Schmid (1893–1934), music critic and poet, as well as victim of the Night of the long knives (Röhm-Putsch 1934)

== Twin city and Navy sponsorship ==
Weilheim has a sister city relationship with the French city of Narbonne. This relationship originated from an incident in 1965, when French Scouts from Narbonne were camping near Weilheim and were caught off guard by flooding. The residents of Weilheim came to their aid, and this led to friendly ties with the French city, which were formalized with the signing of a partnership agreement in Narbonne in 1971 and in Weilheim in 1974. Since 1988, this partnership has been celebrated with “French Week,” organized by the Weilheim Chamber of Commerce, on the first weekend of July each year at Marienplatz in Weilheim. Every two years, “Bavarian Week” takes place in the sister city of Narbonne. The respective festivals are attended by high-ranking delegations from each sister city.

Furthermore, the town maintains a sponsorship with a German Navy Minehunter (Frankenthal-class Type 332) christened Weilheim. Its predecessor of the same name (christened in 1958) is on display at the German Navy Museum (Deutsches Marinemuseum) in Wilhelmshaven. The proposal for the ship sponsorship came at the suggestion of the then-Minister of Defense, Franz Josef Strauß. One of the ship's anchors is on display near the old town wall.
