= Dachsbräu =

Brewery in Weilheim, Germany

- Dachsbräu Logo
- Interactive map of Dachsbräu
- Location: Weilheim in Oberbayern, Bavaria, Germany
- Coordinates: 47°50′11.2″N 11°08′34.3″E
- Opened: 1879; 147 years ago
- Key people: Ulrike Flassig; Günter Klose; Ulrich Klose
- Owner: private
- Employees: 8
- Website: https://dachsbier.de/

The Brauerei Dachsbräu ("Dachsbräu Brewery"), founded in 1879, is located in Weilheim in Oberbayern and has an annual output of approximately 8,500 hectoliters. It is distributed and drunken in a radius of 50 km around Weilheim.

The Dachsbräu Brewery was founded in Weilheim in 1879 by the Munich brewer Georg Dachs (formerly of Gabelsbergerstraße 61 in Munich).

Georg Dachs purchased a farmstead with accompanying land at "Am Saliteranger", which had been put up for auction. In the same year Dachs was producing wheat beer and brown ale. Since the brewery founder’s grandsons were killed in World War II, the widowed Berta Dachs married her second husband, Gustl Beck, who ensured the business’s survival in the postwar years. In the 1970s a nephew of Gustl Beck, Ulrich Klose, became the master brewer. After Gustl's death in 1998, Ulrich Klose took over the brewery and continued the family tradition.

Around 2000, Dachsbräu got some recognition as a proponent for a can deposit system, that was discussed at the time. That is why the brewery was mentioned in a speech by then Minister for the Environment Jürgen Trittin.

In 2018, Dachsbräu won the gold medal at the European Beer Star Awards for its "Weilheimer Festbier" in the "German Style Festbier" category, as well as the silver medal in the "Consumer’s Favorite" category.

Today, the brewery is the last one remaining in Weilheim.
