= Placidus Braun =

Bavarian Benedictine priest, historian and archivist

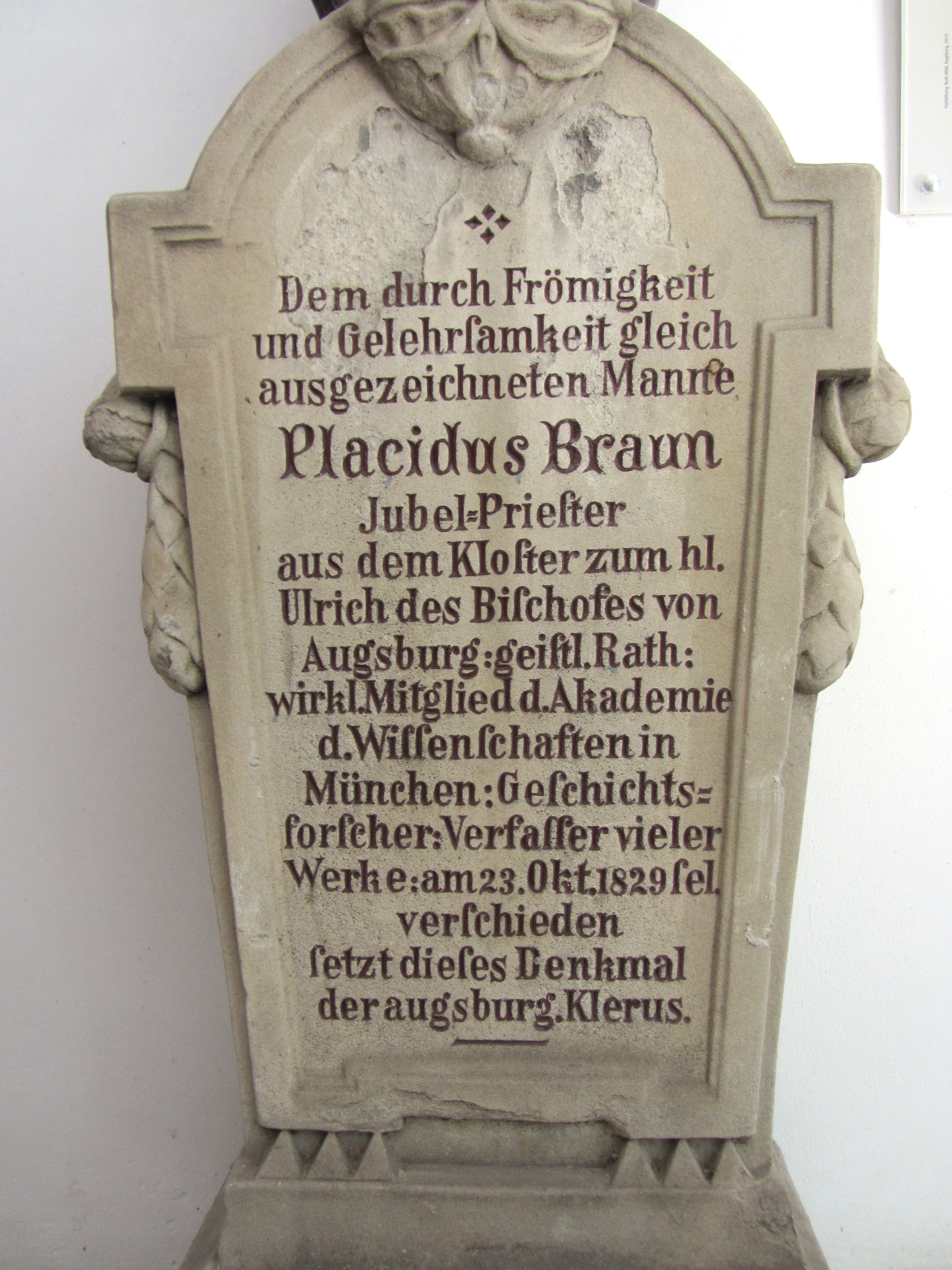
Monument to Placidus Braun in the Catholic cemetery in Augsburg

Placidus Braun, O.S.B. (11 February 1756 in Peiting near Schongau, Upper Bavaria – 23 October 1829 in Augsburg, Germany) was a Bavarian Benedictine priest, historian and archivist.

== Biography ==
At thirteen he went as a choir-boy of the Benedictine Abbey of Saints Ulrich and Afra in Augsburg and was a pupil for six years in the Jesuit gymnasium of the same city. He entered the Abbey of Saints Ulrich and Afra as a novice on 13 May 1775 and was ordained a priest on 18 September 1779.

In 1785 he was made head librarian of the abbey. He arranged and catalogued the library and made known to scholars the rarities it contained through the fine descriptions he gave of its early printed books and manuscripts in two works which he published while librarian. These publications were:

1. Notitia historico-litteraria de libris ab artis typographiae inventione usque ad annum 1479 impressis, in bibliotheca monasterii ad SS. Udalricum et Afram Augustae extantibus. Pars I: Augs. Vindel. 1788. Pars II: Notitia . . . libros complectens ab anno usque ad annum 1500 inclusive impressos. Ibidem, 1789
2. Notitia Historico-litteraria de codicibus manuscriptis in blbliotheca liberi ac imperialis monasterii O. S. Benedicti ad SS. Udalricum et Afram extantibus. Aug. Vindel., 6 partes 1791-1796

After the abbey was dissolved as a result of secularisation, and its building converted into a barrack in 1806, Braun lived with a number of fellow-members of the order in the house of Kaufmanns Fusami near the church of St. Ulrich. In these new surroundings he endeavoured to observe the rules of the order as far as possible, gave assistance in pastoral work, and devoted himself to the study of the history of the Diocese of Augsburg and its suppressed monastic foundations. He was made a foreign member of the Bavarian Academy of Sciences, August 3, 1808, which honour he accepted, but he declined to settle in Munich.

== Notable works ==
Braun bequeathed his manuscripts, which were concerned chiefly with the history of the religious foundations and monastic houses of the Diocese of Augsburg, to the diocesan archives. Among his historical writings the following may be mentioned:

- Geschichte der Bischöfe von Augsburg, chronologisch und diplomatisch verfasst, 4 volumes (Augsburg, 1813–15)
- Codex diplomaticus monasterii S. Udalrici et Afrae notis illustratus issued as volumes 22 and 23 of the Monumenta Boica (Munich, 1814–15)
- Geschichte der Kirche und des Stiftes der hll. Ulrich und Afra in Augsburg (Augsburg, 1817)
- Geschichte des Kollegiums der Jesuiten in Augsburg (Munich, 1822)
- Historisch-topographische Beschreibung, der Diocese Augsburg, 2 volumes (Augsburg, 1823)
- Die Domkirche zu Augsburg und der hohere und niedere Klerus an derselben (Augsburg, 1829)
