= Peißenberg =

- Municipality
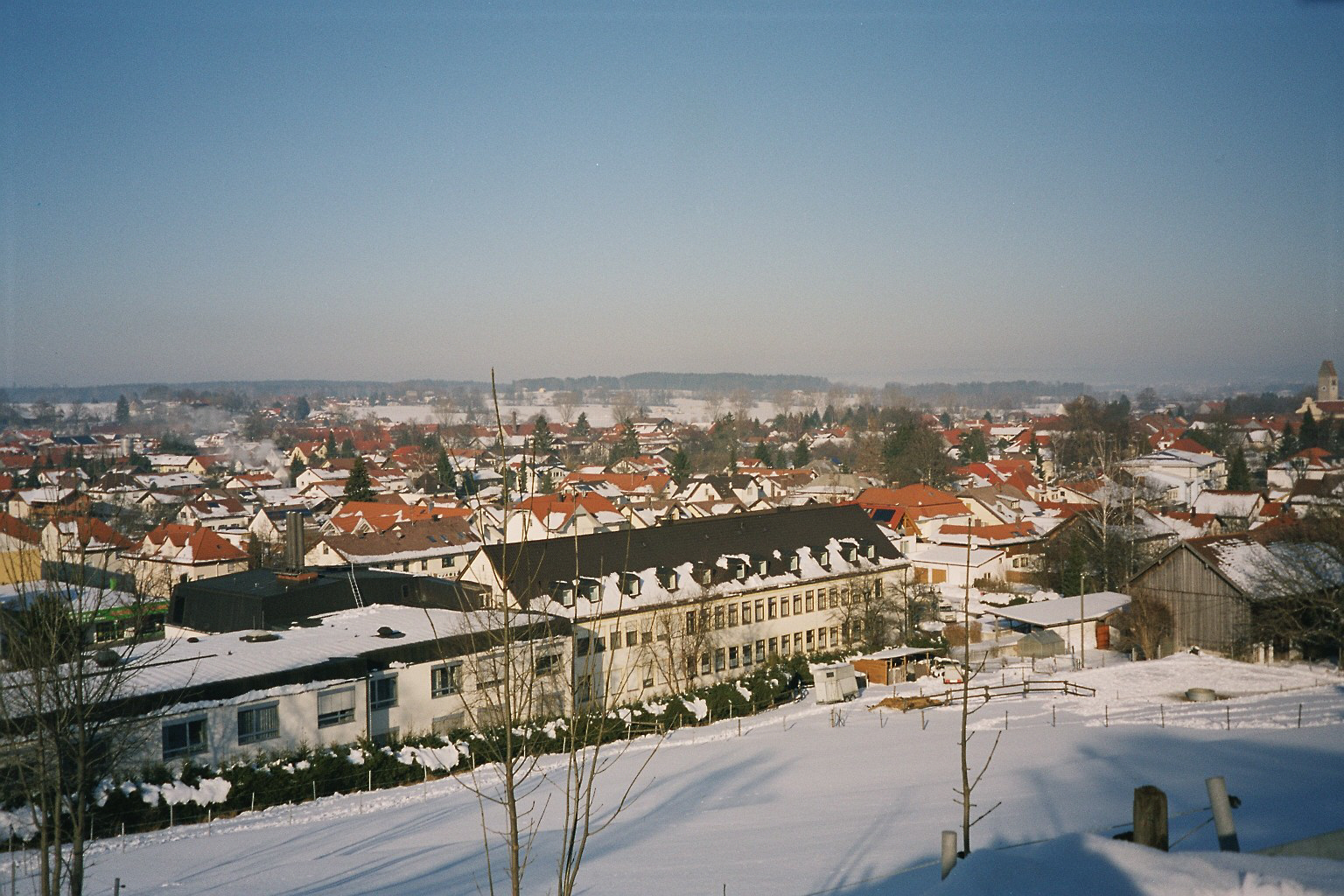
- Peißenberg in winter

- Coat of arms

- Location of Peißenberg within Weilheim-Schongau district
- Interactive map of Peißenberg
- Location within Germany Location within Bavaria
- Coordinates: 47°47′42″N 11°03′37″E
- Country: Germany
- State: Bavaria
- Admin. region: Upper Bavaria
- District: Weilheim-Schongau

Government
  - Mayor (2020–26): Frank Zellner

Area
  - Total: 32.69 km^{2} (12.62 sq mi)
- Elevation: 584 m (1,916 ft)

Population (2025-12-31)
  - Total: 13,154
  - Density: 402.4/km^{2} (1,042/sq mi)
- Time zone: UTC+01:00 (CET)
  - Summer (DST): UTC+02:00 (CEST)
- Postal codes: 82380
- Dialling codes: 08803
- Vehicle registration: WM
- Website: www.peissenberg.de

Peißenberg (German pronunciation: [ˈpaɪsn̩bɛʁk]) is a municipality in the Weilheim-Schongau district, in Bavaria, Germany. It is situated 7 km southwest of Weilheim in Oberbayern.

== Transport ==
Peißenberg has two train stations, Peißenberg and Peißenberg Nord. Both are situated on the Weilheim–Peißenberg railway and offer hourly connections to Augsburg.

== Sport ==
The aeroclub Weilheim-Peißenberg flying at Paterzell airfield is rather successful in glider aerobatics: 2006 German National Champion Markus Feyerabend and Hans-Georg Resch are members of the German national glider aerobatics team.

== People ==
- Alexander Dobrindt (born 1970), politician (CSU)
