= Georg Petel =

German sculptor

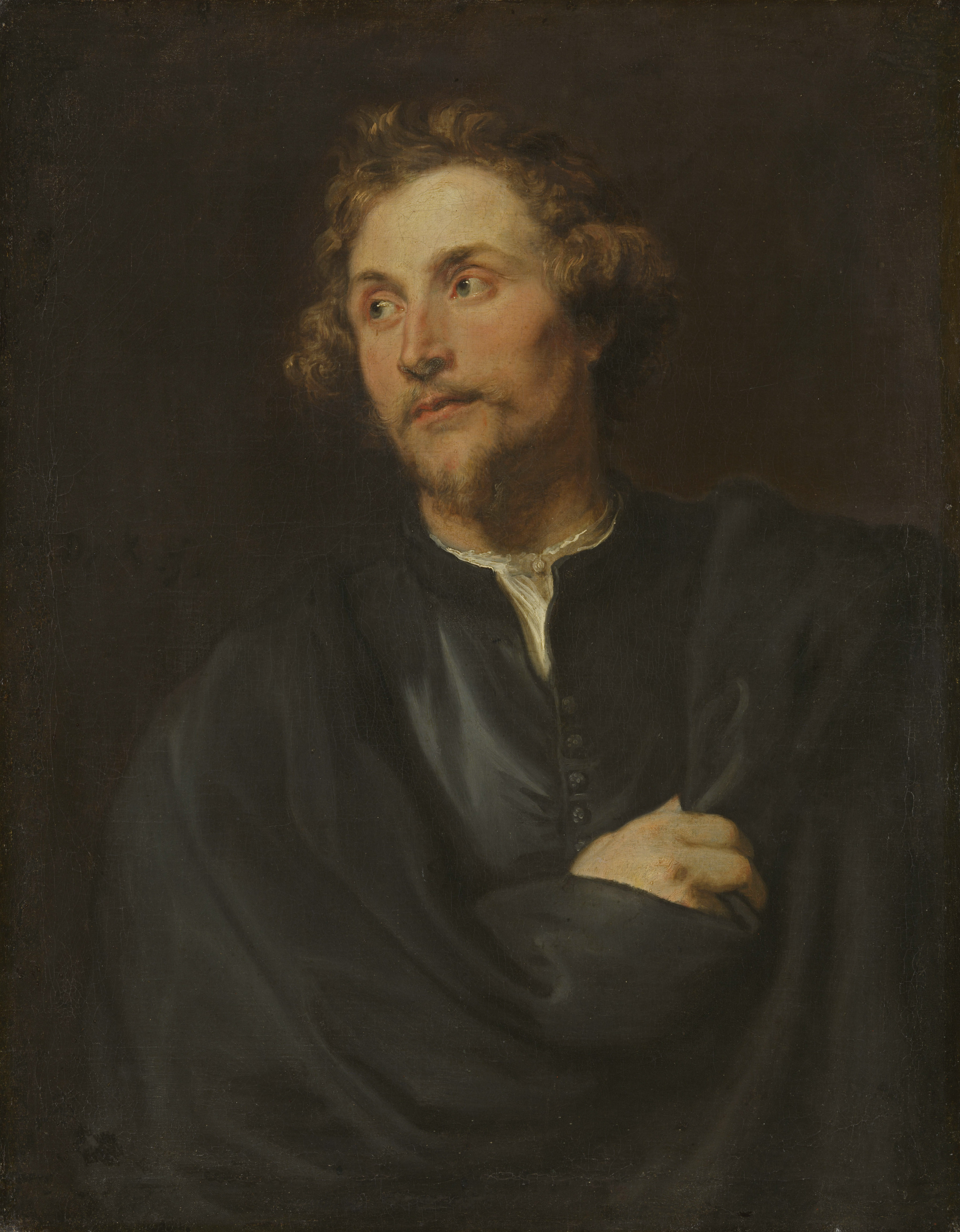
Georg Petel, painted by Anthony van Dyck 1628

Georg Petel or Jorg Petel (1601/02, Weilheim, Bavaria – January 1635, Augsburg) was a German sculptor and a virtuoso ivory carver. His work marks the beginning of Baroque sculpture in Germany.

== Life ==
Petel was born in 1601 or 1602 in Weilheim, Bavaria, about forty kilometres south-west of Munich, the son of Clement Petle (or Betle -alternative spellings), a cabinetmaker. He grew up an orphan as both his parents died when he was a small child. Bartholomäus Steinle, a local carver, became his guardian and was his first master. Petel learned ivory carving in the court cabinet-making studio of Christoph Angermair in Munich. At the beginning of the Thirty Years' War, he left Germany and became an itinerant craftsman. In 1620/21 he met Peter Paul Rubens in Antwerp who was an important influence.

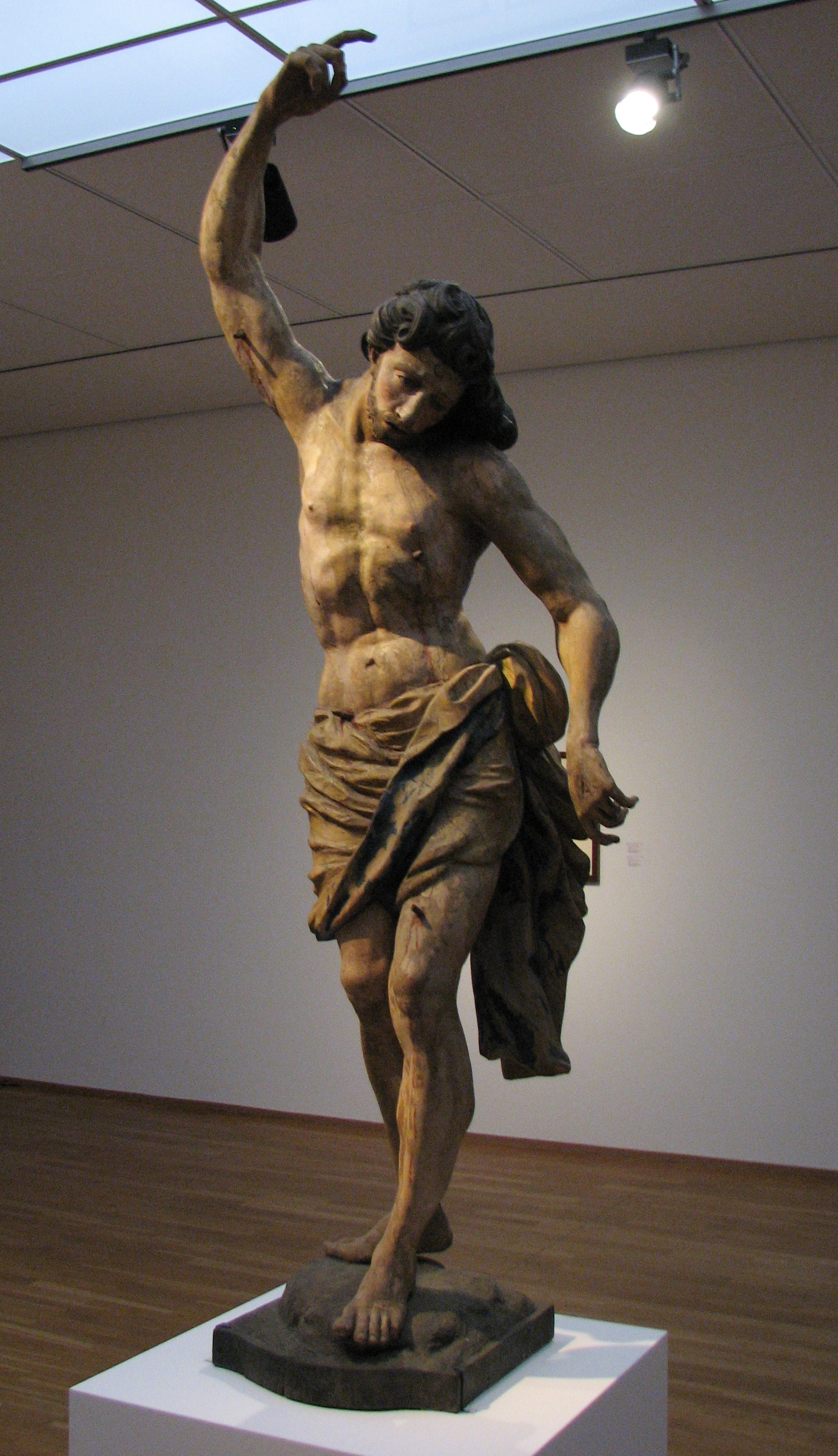
Saint Sebastian

He later travelled via Paris to Rome. In Rome he copied both antique and modern works. Here he also met Anthony van Dyck and François Duquesnoy, the leading Flemish representatives of the Baroque in respectively painting and sculpture in Rome. He resided in Genoa from 1622 to 1624 where he received many commissions from local noble families. He was regarded by his patrons as the greatest ivory carver of his time. He subsequently travelled to Livorno, where he made studies after Pietro Tacca’s bronze Slaves, which is part of the monument to Ferdinand I de’ Medici on the Piazza della Darsena. He returned to Antwerp in 1624 where he visited Rubens again.

In late 1624 Petel returned to Germany as a free master and first took commissions from various electors and princes who tried to engage him as their court sculptor. He rather chose to settle in the liberal city Augsburg. Here he would reside for the remainder of his life apart from occasional trips to the Southern Netherlands. During one of these trips in 1633 he made a bust portrait of Rubens which, in its spontaneity, recalls the work of Gianlorenzo Bernini. Van Dyck also painted his portrait on one of these visits to Antwerp although the portrait may also have been painted earlier in Rome (around 1622–23). In Augsburg he received many orders from the nobility and the church. He created numerous works including the second labour of Hercules, a salt barrel showing the Triumph of Venus, statues of Saint Sebastian and also St. Christopher in St. Moritz Church, Augsburg (1628).

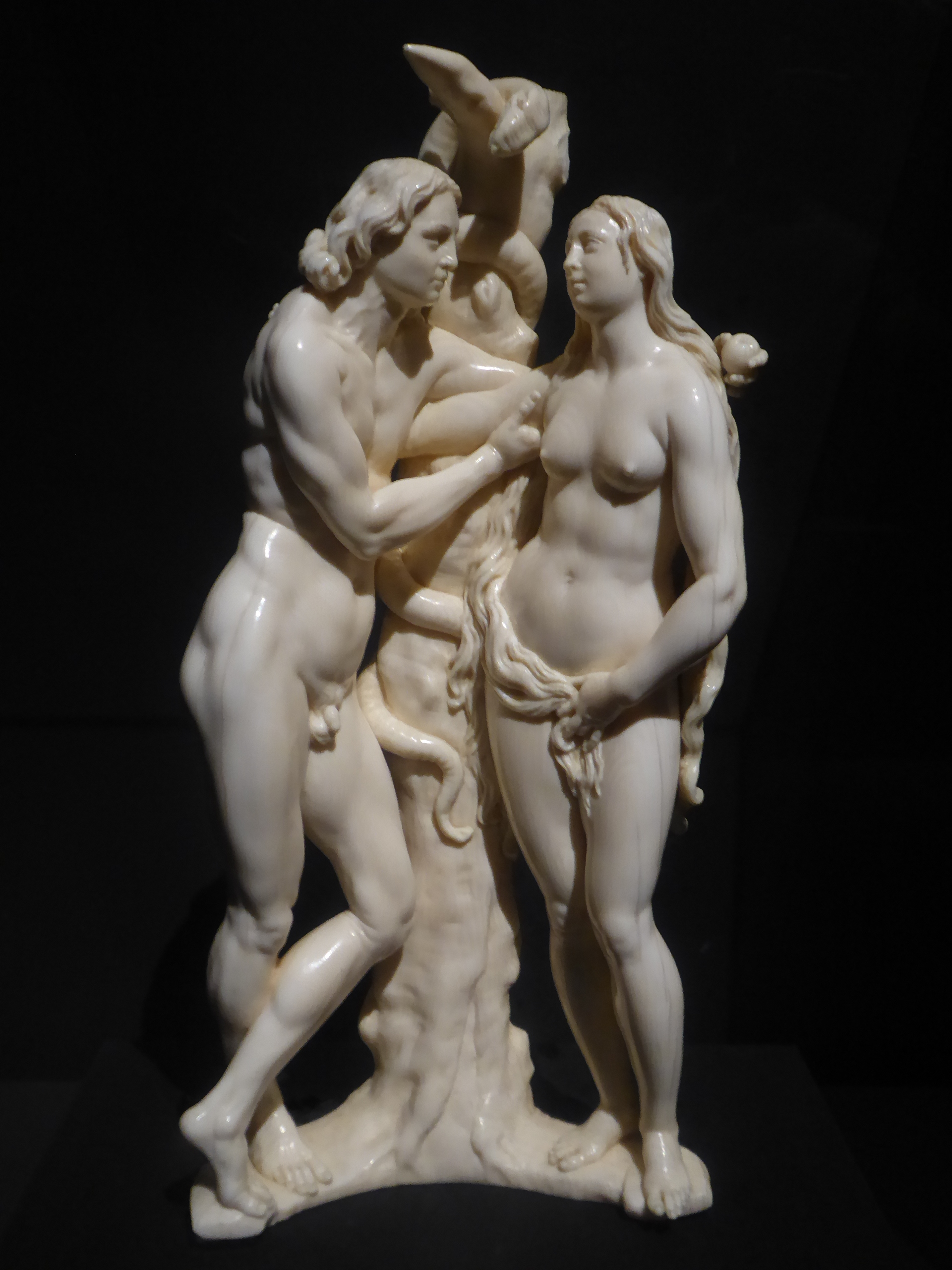
Adam and Eve at the Rubenshuis, Antwerp

During the siege of Augsburg by the army of the Catholic League, thousands of its inhabitants succumbed to hunger and epidemics. Petel's trail is also lost in the turmoil. He probably died of the plague in Augsburg in January 1635 at the age of 33 or 34.

== Work ==
The so-called Weilheim school of his home town, the study of the antique and influences of contemporary sculptors of Italy all influenced Petel's style. Petel did not orient himself solely on late-Mannerist and Baroque sculpture. He also adopted ideas from contemporary painting such as that of Rubens. Rubens' type of the crucified Christ with arms raised very high were translated by Petel to his ivory statuettes. This style was well suited to ivory carving, as it allowed the figure to be made in a single piece. He carved the ivory crucifix, discovered recently at the Carmelite convent in Pontoise, when he was in Paris in 1621 at the age of just nineteen. The influence of Rubens and the study of nature allowed him to transcend the Mannerist tendencies in sculpture. His "St. Mary Magdalene" in Regensburg Niedermünster anticipated the High Baroque of Bernini.

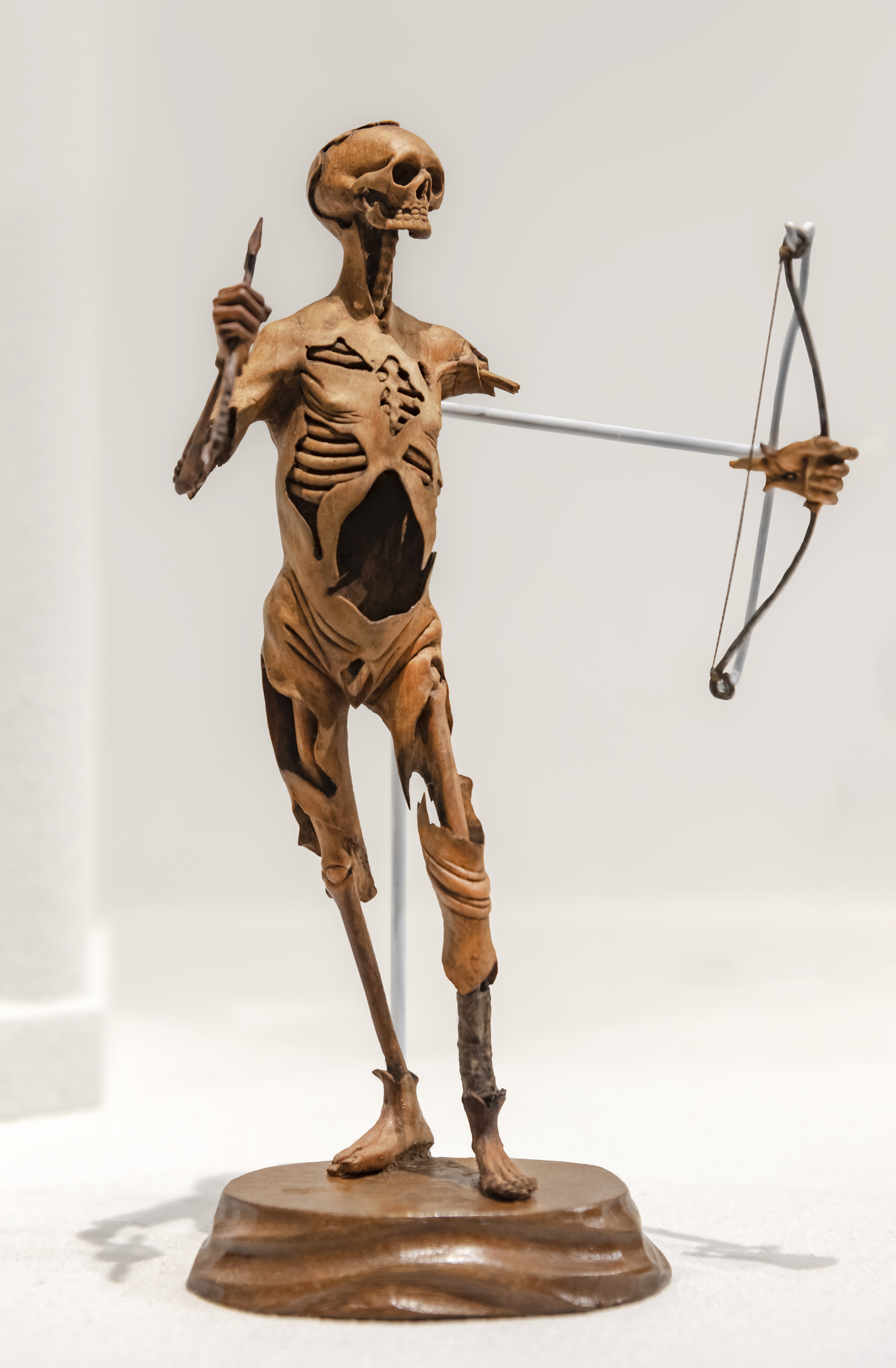
Death archer Musée des Arts Décoratifs, Paris

During his repeated visits to Rubens in Antwerp, he produced after Rubens' designs some of his most famous small sculptures such as "Venus and Cupid" (Ashmolean Museum, Oxford), freely adapted from the Aphrodite of Cnidus but in its soft modelling closer in style to Rubens. Inspired by Rubens' sketches was also a salt container with the "Triumph of Venus" (Stockholm Palace). Its concise composition and soft, sensual modelling make it a supreme achievement in Petel's ivory work. His statue of a Saint Christopher for the St Moritz Church in Augsburg also references an altarpiece of the 'Deposition' by Rubens of 1611 (in the Antwerp Cathedral). This statue served as the model for many 17th-century representations of the saint in southern Germany. In 1631 he made a life-size limewood statue of 'Salvator mundi' for the altar of the St Moritz Church in Augsburg.

Petel also created figures of saints and in particular Saint Sebastian, who was regarded as a protector against the plague. He chose subjects from mythology and pioneered an earthy eroticism in his treatment of these subjects.

He worked mainly in wood and ivory but was no less skilled in bronze. He worked equally well on large as small formats. He prepared his sculptures carefully using wax models and drawings.

Examples of his work can be found in the Kunsthistorisches Museum, Vienna; the Residenz Museum, Munich; St. Moritz Church, Augsburg, the Bavarian National Museum in Munich, and the Museum of Fine Arts, Boston.

== Biographical works (in German) ==
- Leon Krempel, 'Georg Petel'
- Alfred Schädler, Eva Langenstein, und Peter Volk, 'Georg Petel: Barockbildhauer zu Augsburg' (1985)
- Theodor Müller und Alfred Schädler, 'Georg Petel' (Published – 1964)
