= Weilheim (Oberbay) station =

Railway station in Weilheim in Oberbayern, Germany

Weilheim (Oberbay)
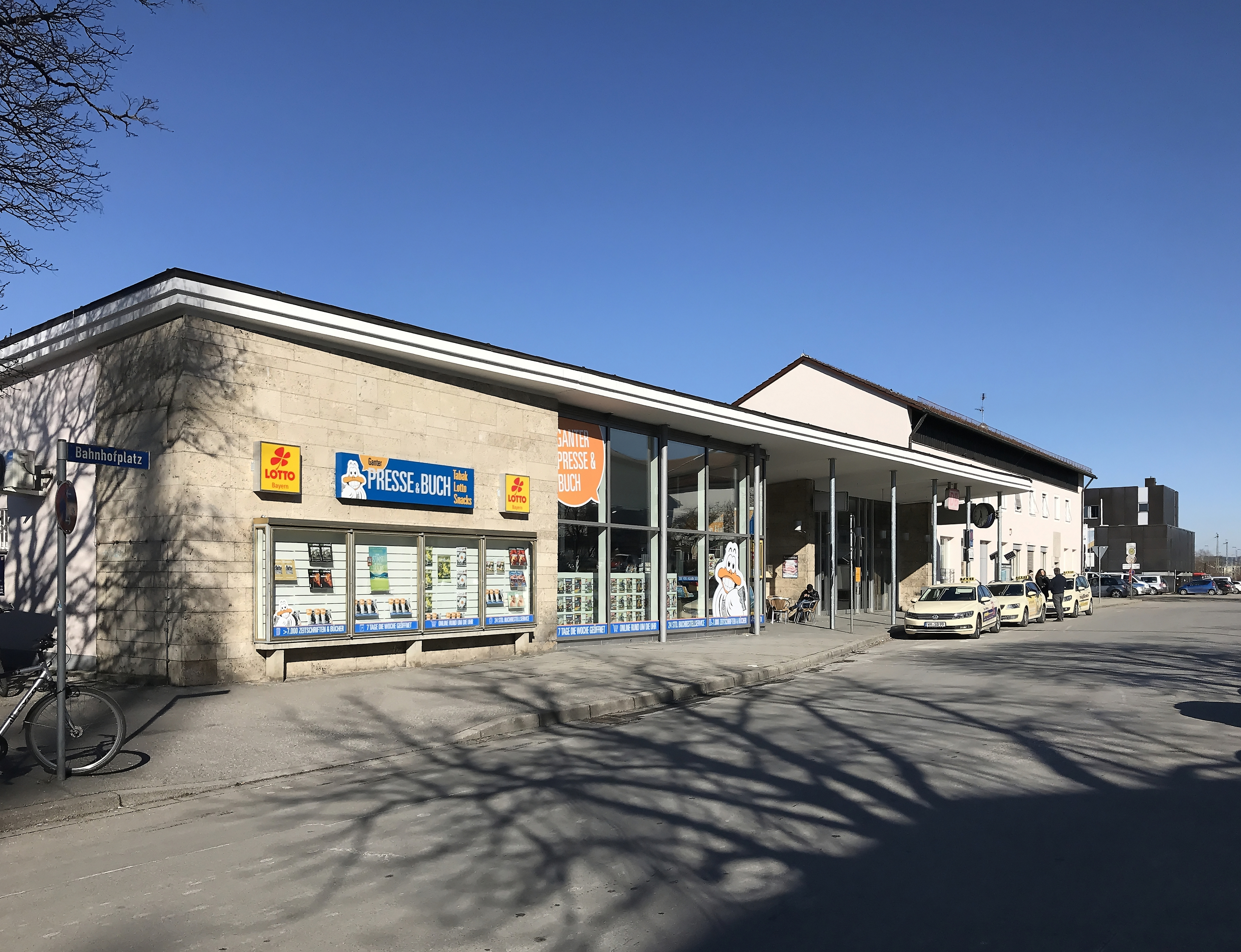
- Entrance building from the streetside (2018)

General information
- Location: Bahnhofplatz 1, Weilheim in Oberbayern, Bavaria; Germany
- Coordinates: 47°50′42″N 11°08′35″E
- Lines: Munich–Garmisch-Partenkirchen (km 53.5); Mering–Weilheim (km 54.6); Weilheim–Peißenberg (km 0.0)
- Platforms: 5

Construction
- Accessible: Yes

Other information
- Station code: 3979
- DS100 code: NWH
- IBNR: 8000220
- Category: 4
- Website: stationsdatenbank.de; www.bahnhof.de

History
- Opened: 1 February 1866; 160 years ago
- Electrified: 23 February 1925; 101 years ago

Passengers
- < 10,000 (2006)

Services
Preceding station	DB Fernverkehr	Following station
Murnau towards Garmisch-Partenkirchen	ICE 60	Tutzing towards Saarbrücken Hbf
Preceding station	DB Regio Bayern	Following station
Murnau towards Mittenwald	RE 61	München-Pasing towards München Hbf
Murnau towards Lermoos	RE 62	München-Pasing towards München Hbf
Huglfing towards Innsbruck Hbf	RB 6	Tutzing towards München Hbf
Huglfing towards Pfronten-Steinach	RB 60	Tutzing towards München Hbf
Terminus	RB 65	Tutzing towards München Hbf
Preceding station		Following station
Raisting towards Augsburg-Oberhausen	RB 67	Peißenberg Nord towards Schongau
Location

Weilheim (Oberbay) station is the station of the Bavarian district town of Weilheim in Oberbayern. It is a crossing station on the Munich–Garmisch-Partenkirchen railway, the Ammersee Railway from Mering and the Weilheim–Peißenberg railway. It is classified by Deutsche Bahn as a category 4 station and has five platform tracks. It is served by about 100 trains daily operated by Deutsche Bahn and Bayerische Regiobahn (BRB).

At the opening of the station in Weilheim on 1 February 1866, it was a through station on the Munich–Unterpeißenberg line. With the opening of the line to Murnau on 15 May 1879, which was extended to Garmisch-Partenkirchen in 1889, it became a “separation” station (Trennungsbahnhof) and with the opening of the Ammersee Railway on 30 June 1898 it became a "crossing" station (Kreuzungsbahnhof). It has a small locomotive depot until 1986 with a roundhouse and a turntable.

== Location ==
Weilheim station is located north of inner Weilheim. The tracks run in the north–south direction and run around the city in an arc to the west. The station building is located east of the railway tracks on Bahnhofstraße (station street) and has the address of Bahnhofplatz 1. The street of Am Öferl runs west of the tracks. To the north of the station, Zargesstraße crosses under the tracks through an underpass. To the south, state road 2057, here called Schützenstraße, also runs under the tracks through an underpass.

Weilheim station is at a railway junction of three lines. The Munich–Garmisch-Partenkirchen line (VzG 5504) is a single-track and electrified main line, over which regional services and, at the weekend, Intercity Express trains run. Furthermore, services running from Mering on the Ammersee Railway (VzG 5370) and from Schongau on the Weilheim–Schongau line (VzG 5450) meet each other in Weilheim. Both lines are single track and not electrified and are served only by regional services operated by Bayerische Regiobahn.

Weilheim is served by the following timetable routes:

- KBS 960: Munich–Weilheim–Garmisch-Partenkirchen–Mittenwald–Innsbruck
- KBS 962: Weilheim–Peißenberg–Schongau
- KBS 985: Mering–Augsburg–Geltendorf–Weilheim

== History ==
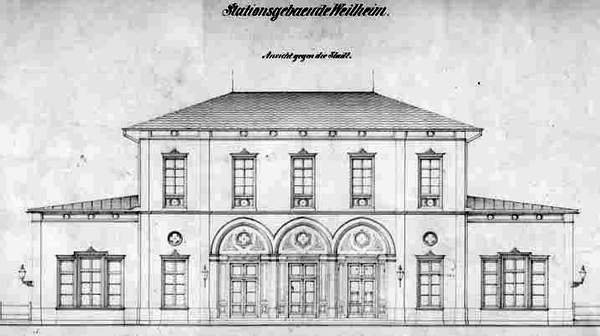
Architect's drawing of an elevation of the station building in 1866

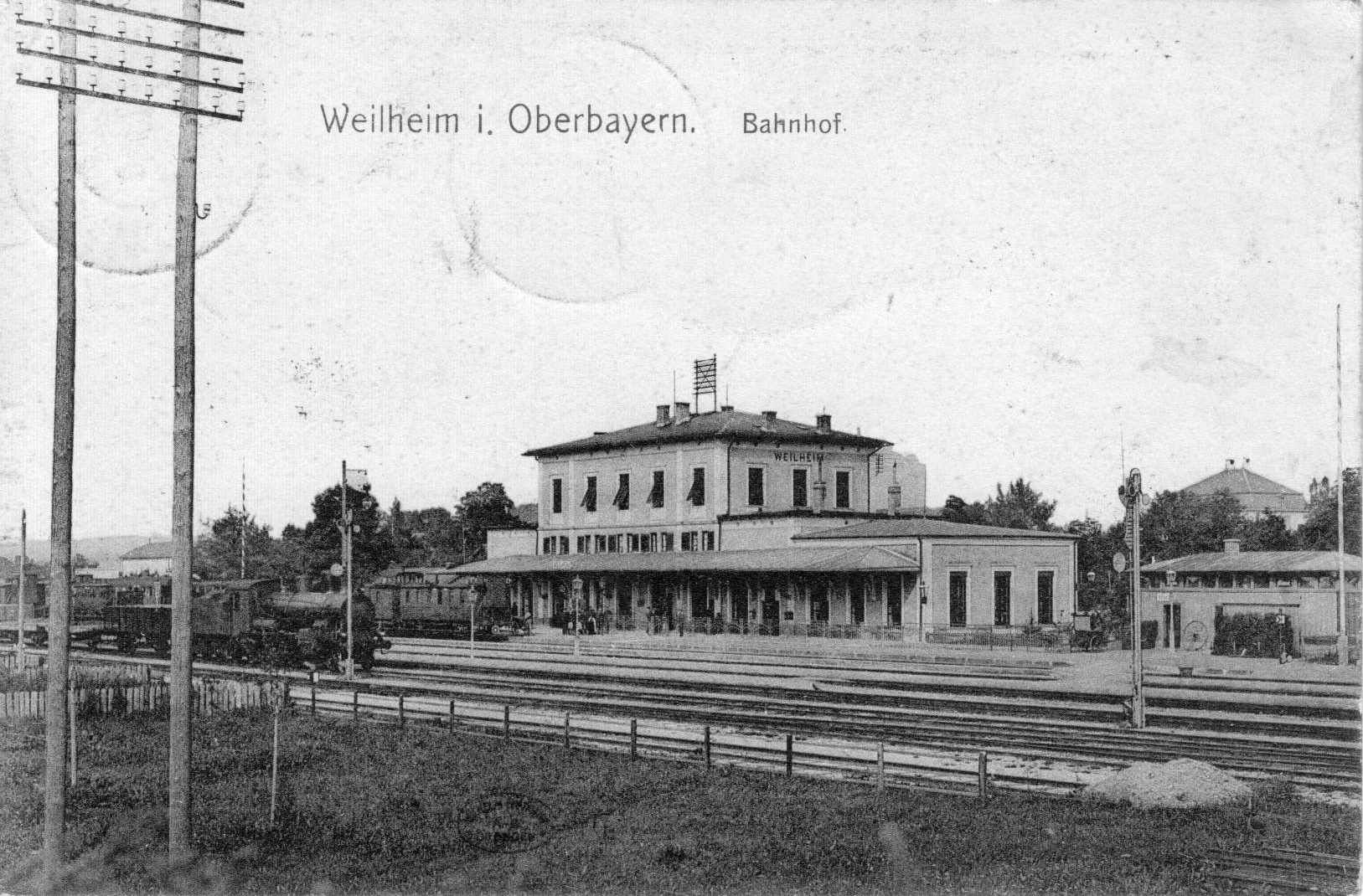
Old station building from the track side (1907)

Weilheim station was opened on 1 February 1866, together with the line from Starnberg via Tutzing to Unterpeißenberg. Starnberg had already been connected by a line from Munich completed on 28 November 1854. The line would primarily carry “pitch coal” (Pechkohle, a form of lignite) mined in Peißenberg. At the station a three-story station building was built with a hip roof and two side extensions, in the neoclassical style. A “railway committee” was founded in Murnau on 8 May 1874 with the aim of building a branch line (a Vizinalbahn, literally a "local railway", which was built by a local community with a state subsidy under a Bavarian law of 1869) from Weilheim to Murnau. On 29 July 1876, the Bavarian state parliament approved the route, allowing construction to start in 1878. The branch line was opened on 15 May 1879, turning Weilheim station into a railway junction. A private railway company, Lokalbahn AG (LAG) opened a branch line from Murnau to Garmisch-Partenkirchen on 25 July 1889 as an extension of the Vizinalbahn, creating a continuous line from Munich via Weilheim to Garmisch-Partenkirchen.

In the early 1870s planning began for a railway line from Augsburg to the Ammersee (Lake Ammer) and continuing towards the Alps. In 1886, the Bavarian government approved the Ammersee Railway, running from Mering near Augsburg via Diessen to Weilheim. Construction of the line began in the autumn of 1886. The Royal Bavarian State Railways opened the section from Weilheim to Dießen on 30 June 1898 and the whole line from Mering to Weilheim was opened on 23 December 1898. Weilheim station became a crossing station. In the 1900s, another building was built for a station restaurant as a southern extension of the entrance building. In addition, the platform roofing was extended on the platform next to the station building. On 1 January 1917, the Weilheim–Peissenberg line (also known as the Pfaffenwinkelbahn—Pfaffenwinkel Railway—after the Pfaffenwinkel region, which lies mainly to the west and south of Weilheim) was extended to Schongau, where it connected to the existing Fuchs Valley Railway to Landsberg am Lech.

In 1924, Deutsche Reichsbahn electrified the line from Munich to Garmisch-Partenkirchen. Electrical operations began between Weilheim and Garmisch-Partenkirchen on 5 January 1925 and electrical operations began between Weilheim and Starnberg on 16 February 1925. Electrical operations on the whole line from Munich to Garmisch-Partenkirchen began on 20 January 1925 and continued over the Mittenwald Railway to Mittenwald and Innsbruck. On 1 May 1925, the Pfaffenwinkel Railway between Weilheim and Peissenberg was also electrified; the electrification on this line mainly served coal transportation.

During the Second World War, the Allies dropped about 250 bombs on the station during an air raid on Weilheim on 19 April 1945. The bombs destroyed the northern part of the station building, parts of the railway tracks and the overhead lines and 20 carriages. A hospital train with wounded Hungarian soldiers was destroyed by fire. There were 24 deaths, including five Hungarian soldiers who were in the hospital train. After the war, Deutsche Reichsbahn replaced the destroyed station building with a long two-storey building with a gable roof.

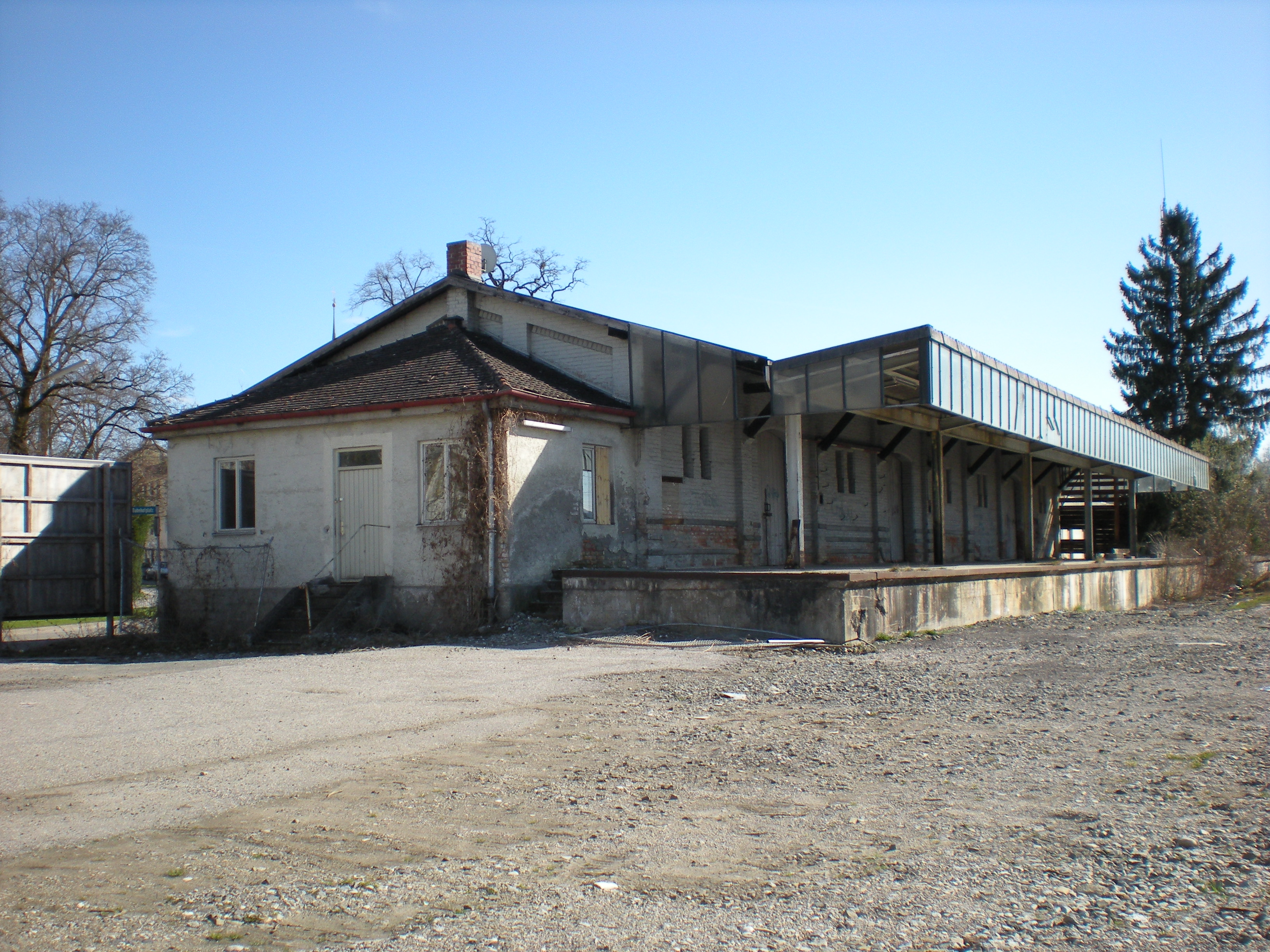
Former goods hall (2013)

In 1977, the station had 23 tracks, but they were cut back during rationalisations by Deutsche Bundesbahn in the following years. In 1981, the three mechanical interlockings of the station were replaced by a centralised track plan pushbutton interlocking and the semaphore signals dating from the State Railways era were replaced by colour light signals. In 1983, Deutsche Bundesbahn removed the overhead line on the line to Peissenberg, since its replacement was necessary, but not financially viable. The locomotive depot was closed and demolished along with its roundhouse and turntable in 1986. The staff of the station fell from 251 to 198 employees between 1982 and 1986.

Most loading and storage sidings to the west and east of the station were closed in November 2001. The town of Weilheim bought the vacant western part of the station precinct in 2002. Railway workers dismantled the disused tracks in this area in March 2002. The other disused sidings were eliminated in 2004.

== Infrastructure ==
=== Entrance building ===
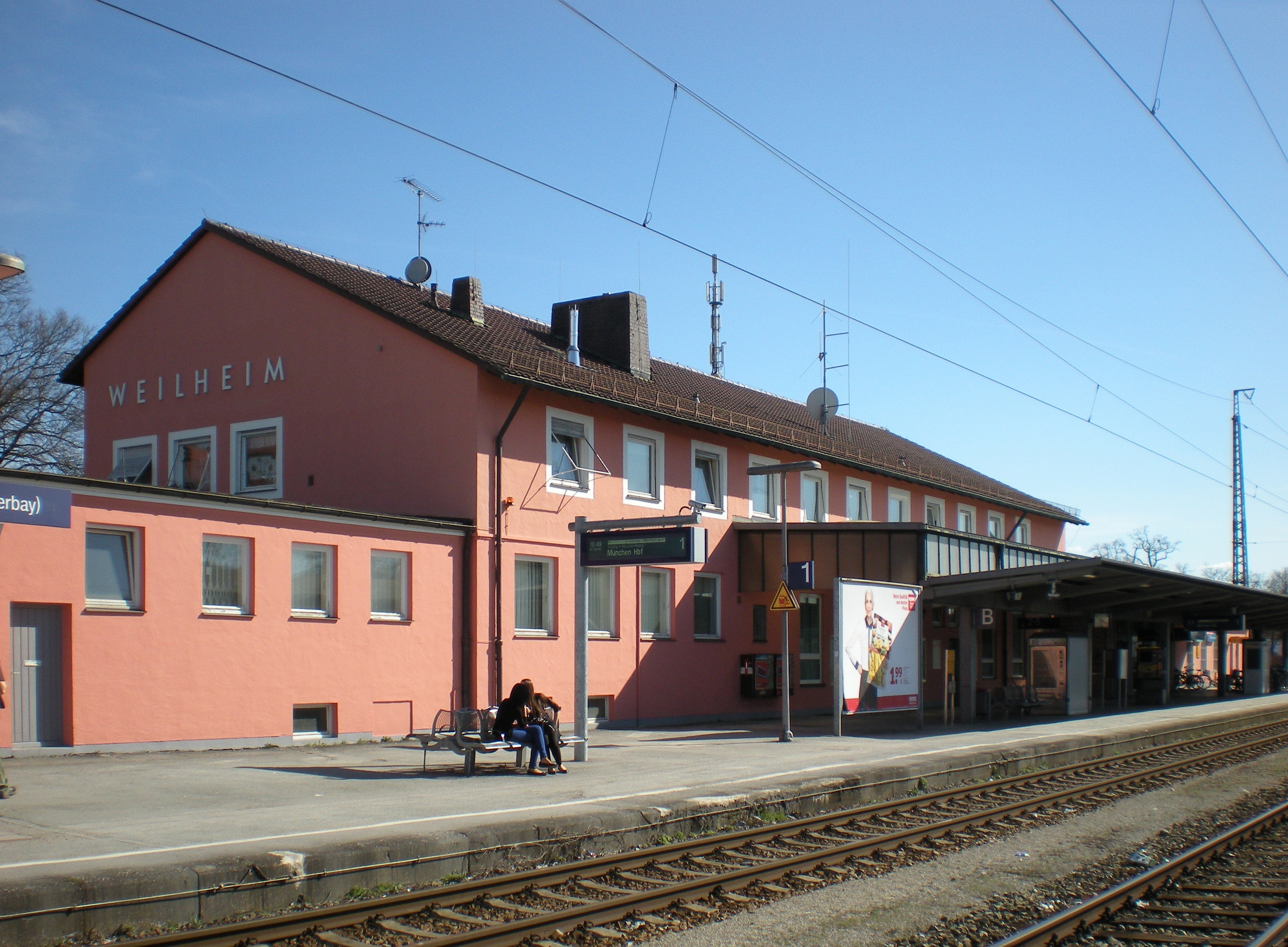
Entrance building from the track side (2013)

The first Weilheim station building was opened in 1866. It was a three-story symmetrical building with a hip roof in the neoclassical style. The facades of the main building were richly structured. To the north and south of the main building there were single-storey extensions with flat roofs, which were the same size as each other. An unusual feature was that the platform canopy over the “home” platform extended along the entire length of the building, which was more common in Austria than in Germany at the time. In the 1900s, a further single-storey building with a hip roof was built on to the southern extension; this included a station restaurant. The platform canopy was extended accordingly. During World War II, the northern part of the building was destroyed in an air raid on 19 April 1945.

In the postwar period, the ruins of the old station building was demolished and a new building was built in its place, which is still in operation. The station building is a long two-story building with an asymmetrical gable roof, connected to the south and north to single-storey buildings with flat roofs. The two-story part of the building includes the operations room, a single-storey annex to the south, which houses the waiting room with access to the platform subway and some shops and a DB travel centre.

==== Platforms and railway tracks ====
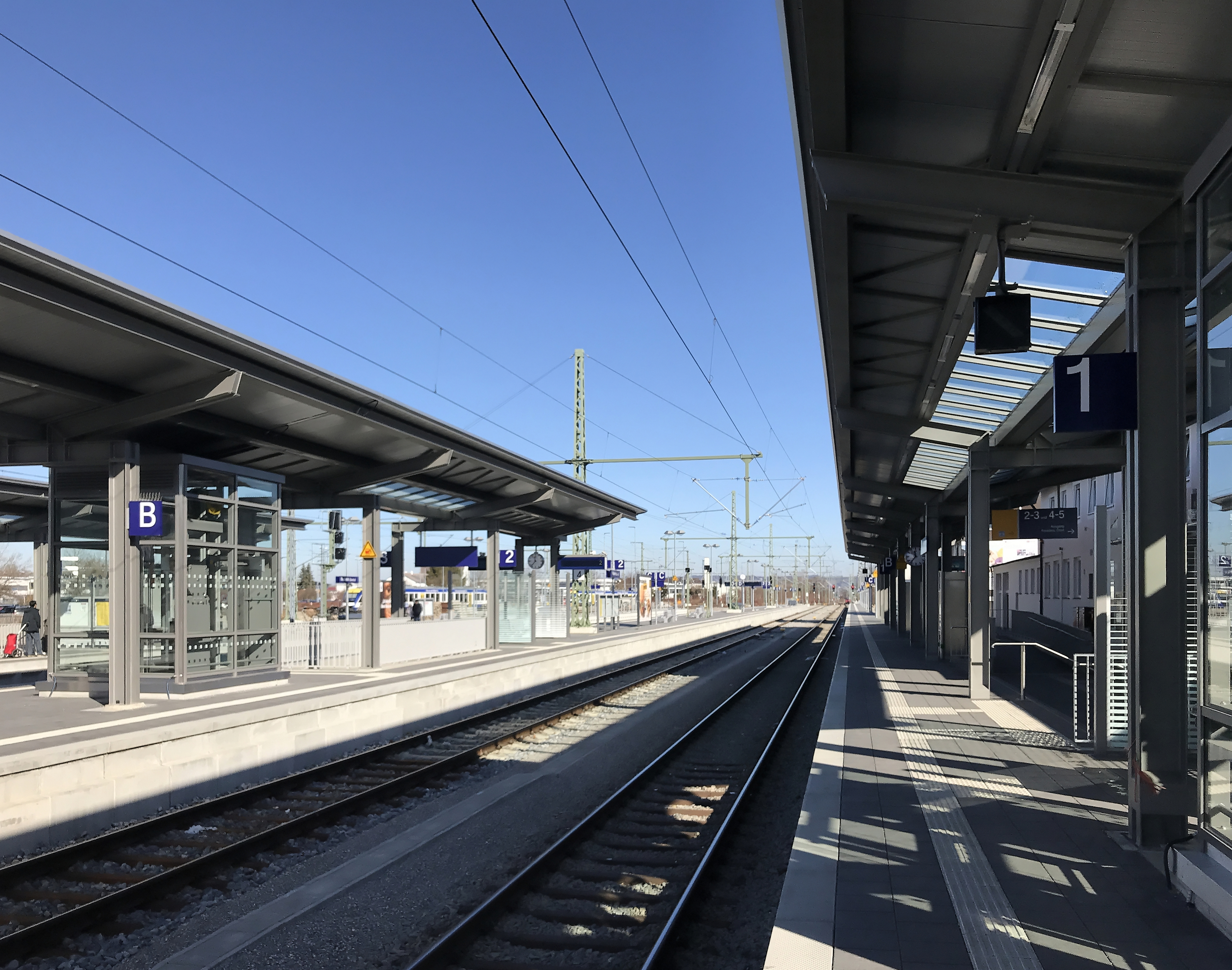
Platforms (2018)

By 1977, Weilheim station had 23 tracks, including five platform tracks. East of the platform tracks there were the local loading tracks, five of which were north and five south of the station building. South of the building there was also the goods shed with a loading dock, equipped with two tracks and a loading road. West of the platform tracks were freight and storage sidings as well as the roundhouse and the turntable of the locomotive depot. Most of the loading and storage sidings were closed and dismantled In the following years and in 2002 and 2004.

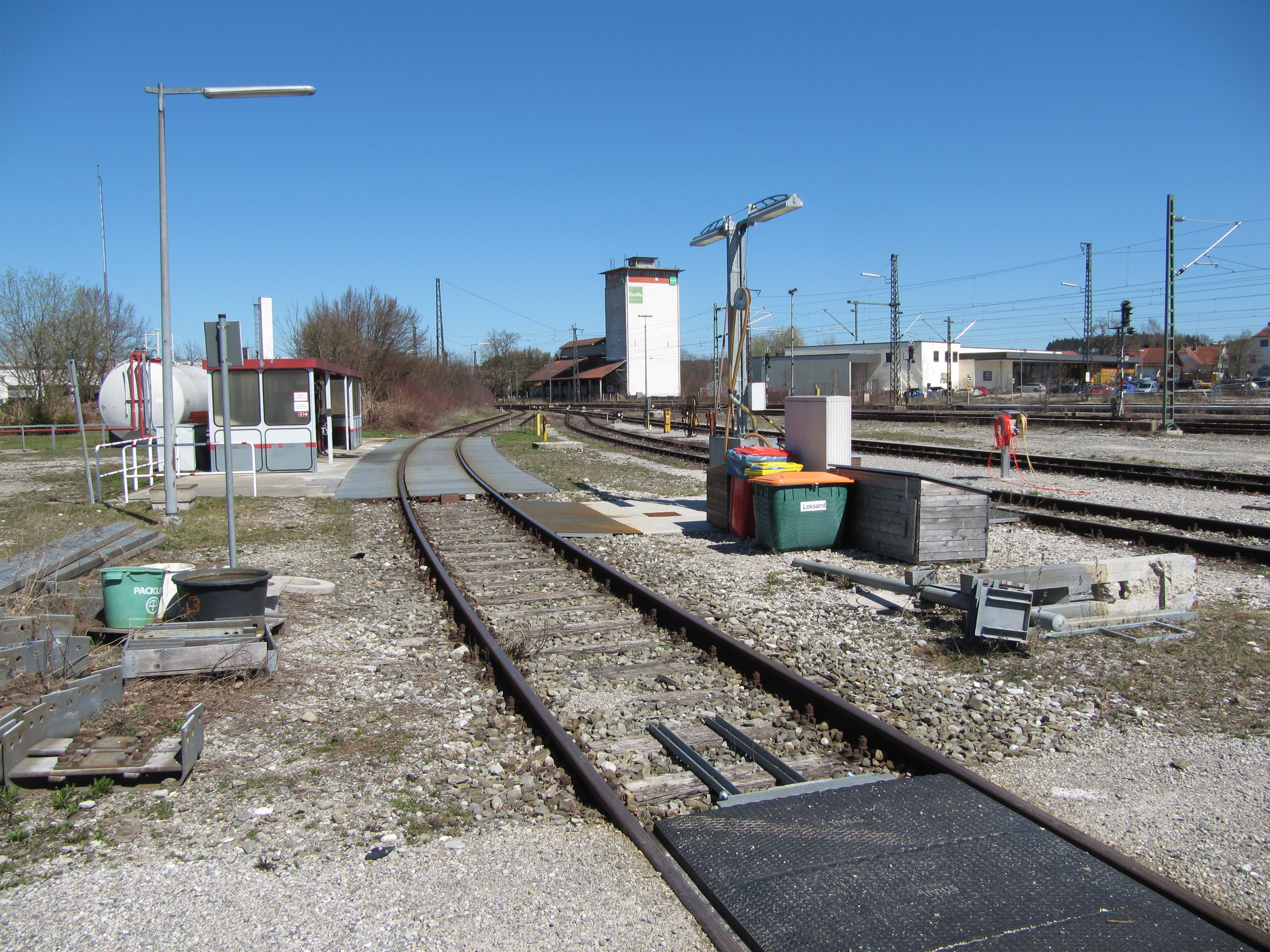
Diesel filling station (2013)

The five platform tracks are located on a home platform and two island platforms, all of which are covered. The platform canopies of the two island platforms still come from the state railway period and are built of wood joists. All platforms are equipped with digital destination indicators in 2009. The island platforms are connected by an underpass to the station building, which was only accessible by stairs until 2017. Because of the low platform height of 34 cm, Intercity-Express trains formerly could not stop in Weilheim. West of the platform tracks, there exist two freight tracks without platforms and three terminating tracks that can only be approached from the north and are used for the parking of Bayerische Regiobahn (BRB) railcars. The goods shed south of the station building is preserved. To the west of the three terminating tracks of the station there is a diesel filling station.

As part of the renovation from 2016 to 2017, the old platforms were demolished and rebuilt one after the other. The platform canopies were completely renewed and all platforms were given barrier-free access to the underpass via lifts from Schindler and tactile paving. The main platform and the first central platform were rebuilt with a height of 76 cm and the other island platform is 55 cm high.

Track	Length in m	Height in cm	Comment
1	238	76	Trains towards Munich and Garmisch-Partenkirchen
2	280	76	Trains beginning and ending in Weilheim or from Munich
3	280	76	Some services towards Garmisch-Partenkirchen
4	180	55	BRB services towards Geltendorf and Augsburg
5	150	55	BRB services towards Peißenberg and Schongau
6		No platform	Train storage
7		No platform	Train storage

=== Signal boxes ===
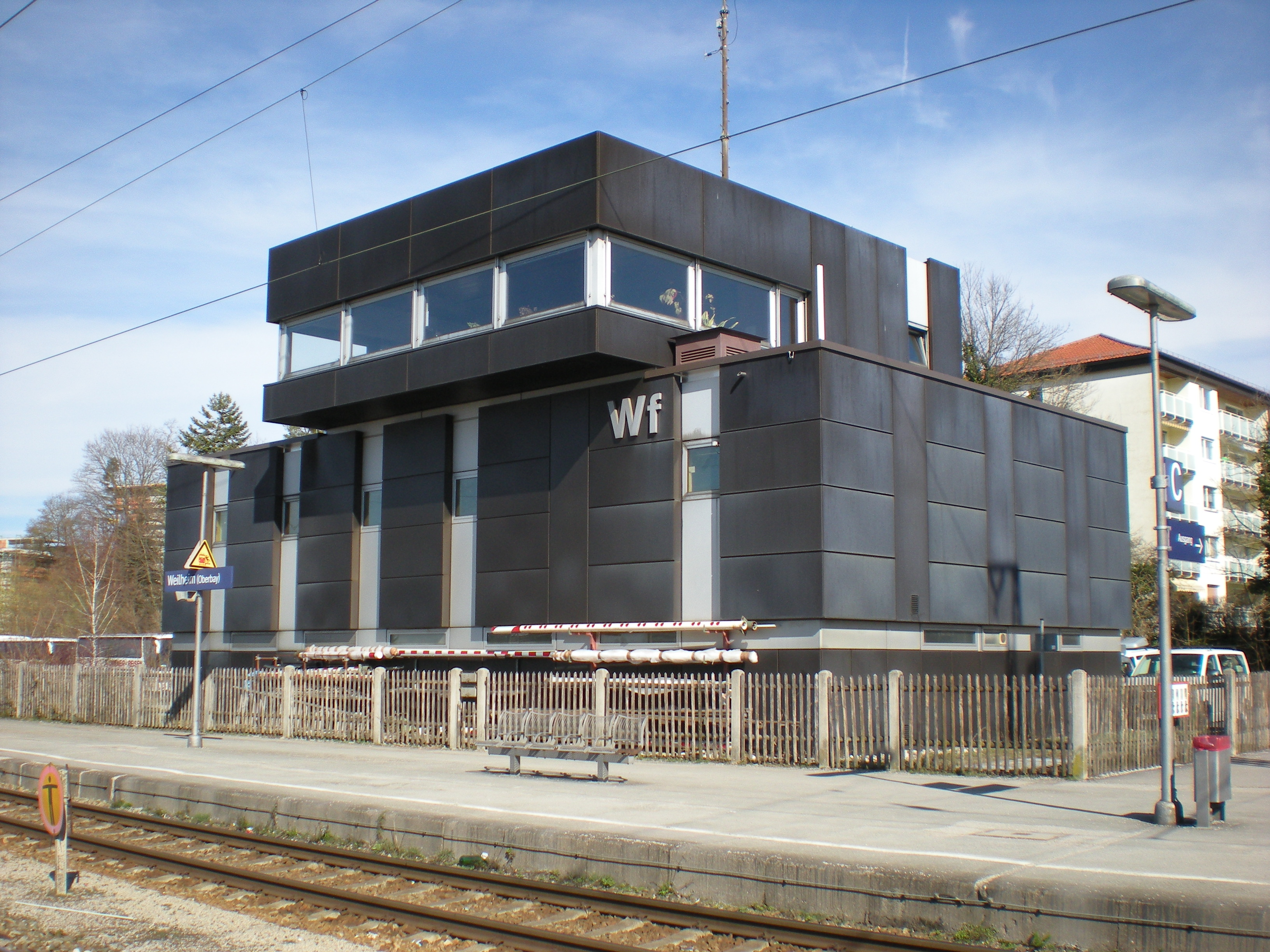
Track-plan push-button interlocking (2013)

The Weilheim station originally had three mechanical signal boxes. Signal box 1 controlled movements between different parts of the station precinct and was located at the northern end of the station west of the tracks. Signal box 2 was operated by the train dispatcher and was situated south of the entrance building between the local loading tracks and the station building. Both were mechanical interlocking of the Krauss class of 1902. Signal box 3 was a mechanical interlocking of the Krauss class of 1925, which controlled the marshalling yard and was located at the southern end of the sidings to the west of the station. In 1983, the three signal boxes were replaced by a centralised signal box with a track-plan push-button interlocking of the Lorenz L60 class, which is housed in a cubic, three-storey building with an attached observation deck. This signal box controls, in addition to the Weilheim station area, the Wilzhofen and Polling areas. The signal box is located on the main platform north of the entrance building.

=== Locomotive depot ===
Due to its importance as a hub, Weilheim station had its own locomotive depot (Lokomotivstation), a branch of Bw München Hbf at Munich Central Station. The locomotive station was located to the west of the station and consisted of a three-stall roundhouse, a turntable and some sidings. Signal box 3 controlled the tracks of the locomotive depot. The locomotive station was closed in 1986 and the roundhouse and turntable were demolished.

=== Services ===
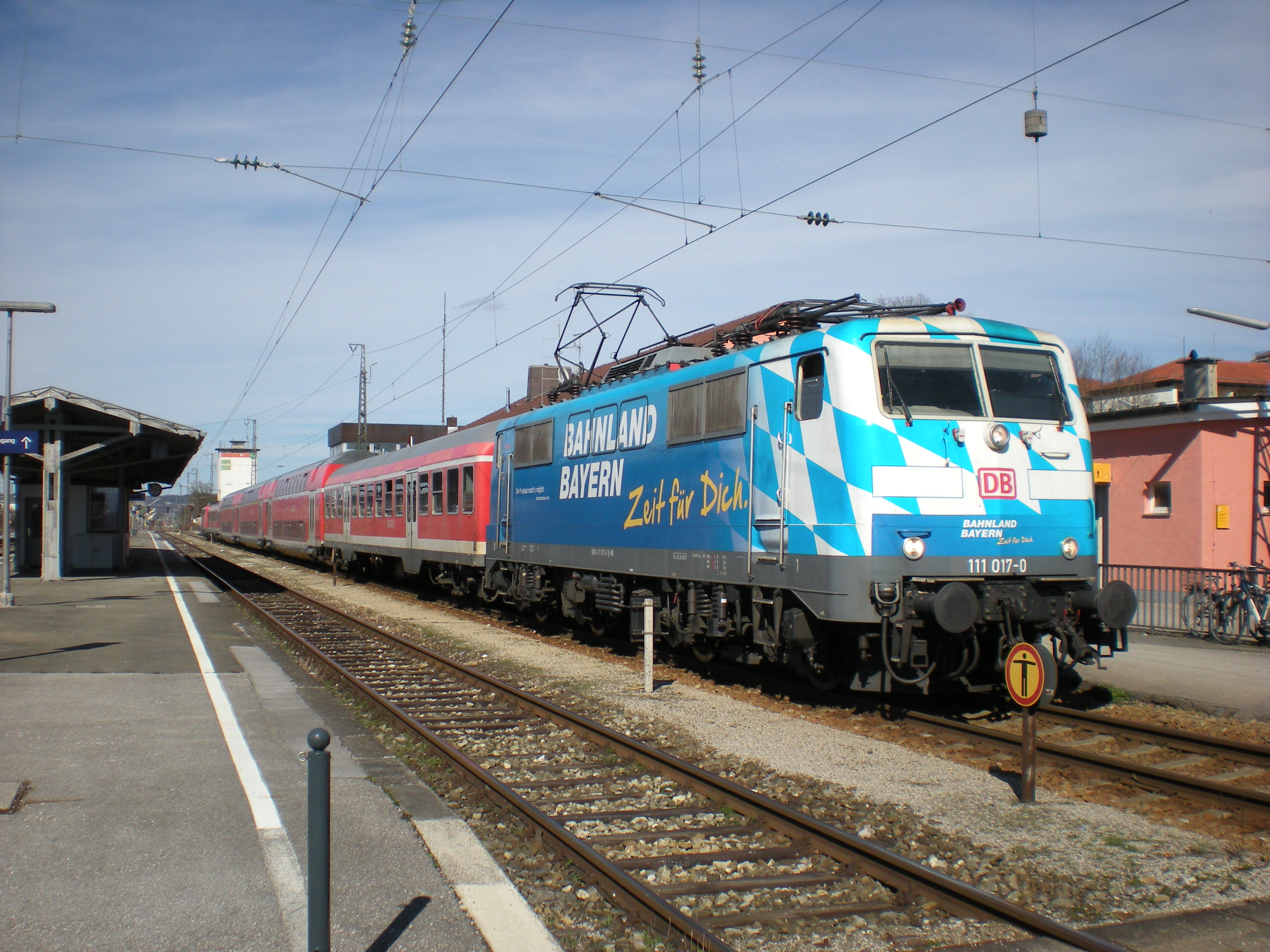
Regionalbahn service to Mittenwald hauled by class 111 locomotive (2013)

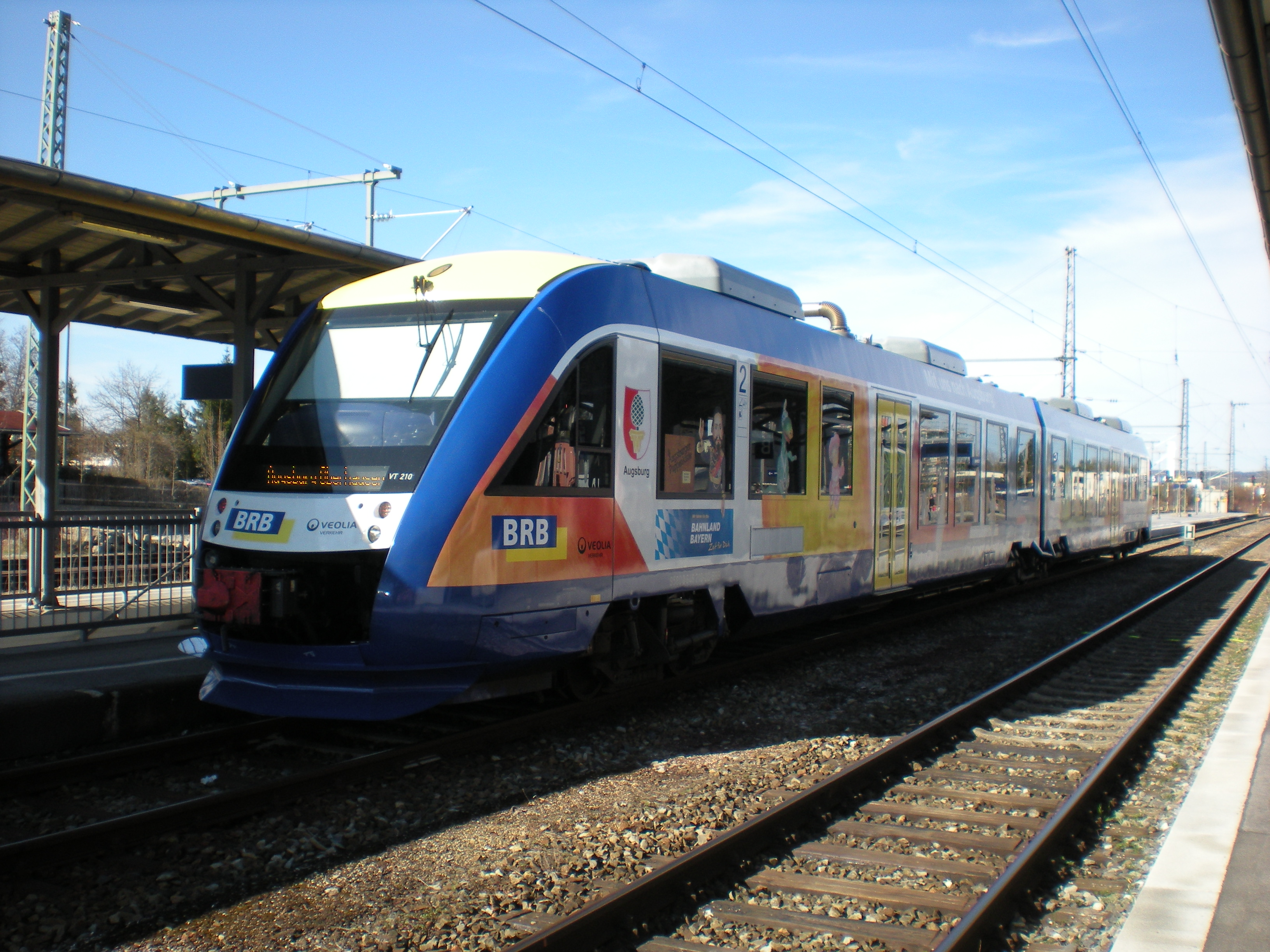
LINT 41 DMU of the BRB (2013)

Weilheim station is served by Regionalbahn services of Deutsche Bahn trains and Bayerische Regiobahn (BRB). The hourly Regionalbahn services from Munich stops in Mittenwald; this continues every two hours to Innsbruck. They consist of electric locomotives of class 111 with Silberling carriages or mixed sets of double-decker and Silberling carriages. In the peak, additional hourly Regionalbahn services run between Munich and Garmisch-Partenkirchen, which means there are services every half-hour in the peak. The Ammersee and the Weilheim–Schongau lines are served every hour by BRB trains operated with LINT 41 diesel multiple units from Augsburg to Schongau. In the peak, additional services run between Geltendorf and Peißenberg, also creating a service at 30-minute intervals. In the winter, the Garmischer Skiexpress (classified as a Regional Express) also runs on weekends from Munich to Garmisch-Partenkirchen Hausberg and is formed from double-decker carriages.

In 2013, class 442 (Bombardier Talent 2) railcars replaced the locomotive-hauled carriage trains on the Regionalbahn service from Munich to Garmisch-Partenkirchen.

Intercity Express trains that run on Saturdays on the Munich–Garmisch-Partenkirchen line, ran through Weilheim station without stopping until the low platform heights of 34 cm were raised in 2016/2017.

In the 2026 timetable, the following services stop at the station:

Line/train type	Route	Interval
ICE 60	Saarbrücken – Kaiserslautern – Mannheim – Stuttgart – Ulm – Augsburg – Munich – Munich – Weilheim – Murnau – Garmisch-Partenkirchen	1 train on some Sats and Suns towards Saarbrücken
RE 61 / RE 62	Munich – Weilheim – Murnau – Garmisch-Partenkirchen – Mittenwald / Lermoos	3 pairs of trains in the peak each in the load direction
RB 6 / RB 60 S6 / S7	Munich – Tutzing – Weilheim – Murnau – Garmisch-Partenkirchen – Mittenwald (– Seefeld in Tirol – Innsbruck / – Reutte in Tirol – Pfronten-Steinach)	Hourly
RB 65	Munich – Tutzing – Weilheim	Hourly
RB 67	Augsburg-Oberhausen – Augsburg Hauptbahnhof – Augsburg Haunstetterstr. – Augsburg-Hochzoll – Mering – Geltendorf – Weilheim	Hourly; 30 mins to Peißenberg in the peak including through trains
RB 67	Weilheim – Peißenberg – Peiting – Schongau	Hourly; 30 mins to Peißenberg in the peak including through trains
As of 14 December 2025
