= Weilheim–Peißenberg railway =

Railway line in Bavaria, Germany

Weilheim–Peißenberg
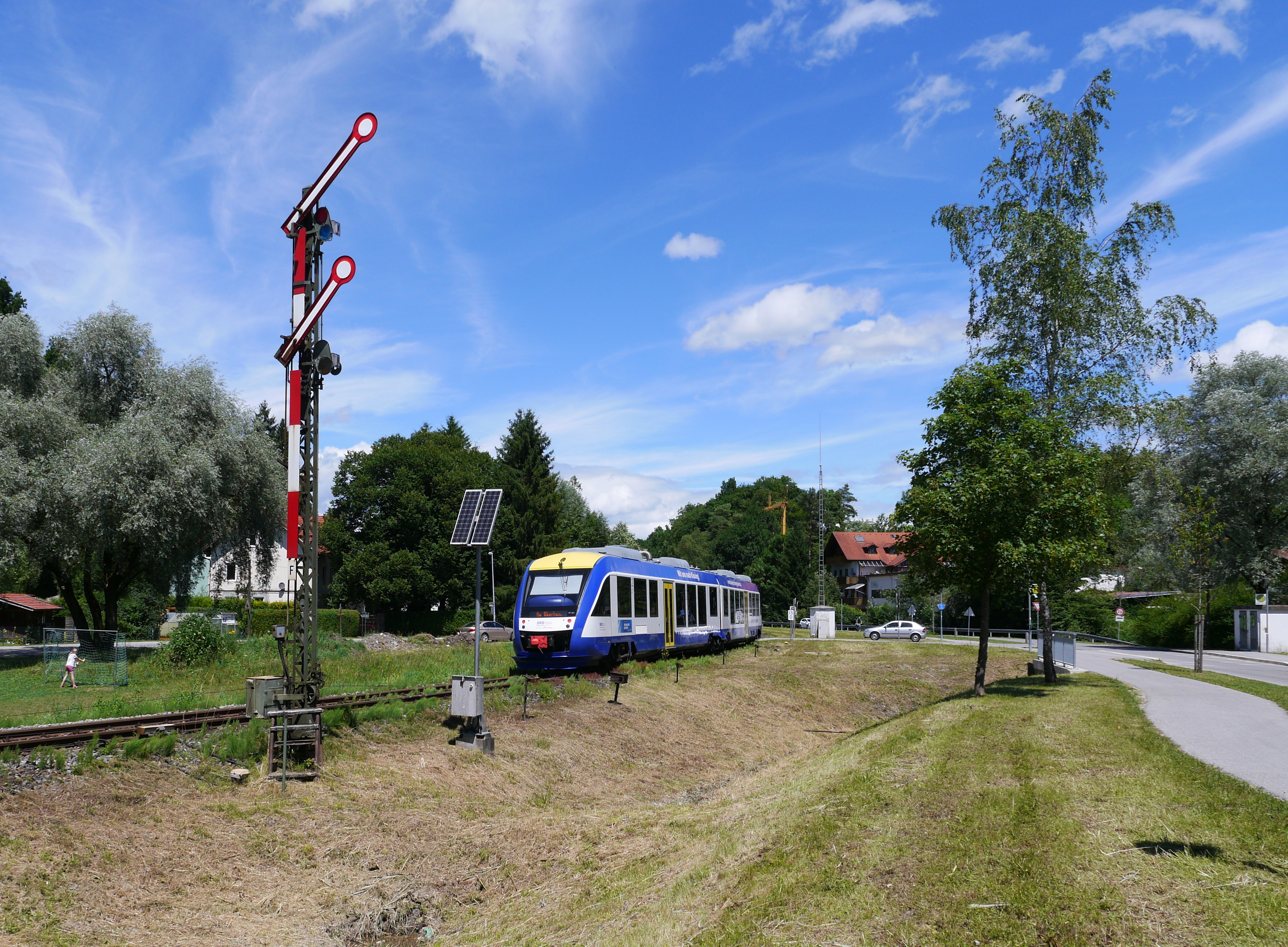
- A Bayerische Regiobahn train at Peißenberg in 2017

Overview
- Line number: 962
- Locale: Upper Bavaria
- Termini: Weilheim (Oberbay); Peißenberg
- Stations: 3

Service
- Services: RB 67
- Route number: 5450

Technical
- Line length: 8.9 km (5.5 mi)
- Track gauge: 1,435 mm (4 ft 8 1/2 in) standard gauge

The Weilheim–Peißenberg railway is a railway line in Upper Bavaria, Germany. It runs 8.9 kilometres (5.5 mi) from a junction with the Munich–Garmisch-Partenkirchen railway in Weilheim (Oberbay) to a junction with the Schongau–Peißenberg railway in Peißenberg.
