= Schongau–Peißenberg railway =

Railway line in Bavaria, Germany

Schongau–Peißenberg
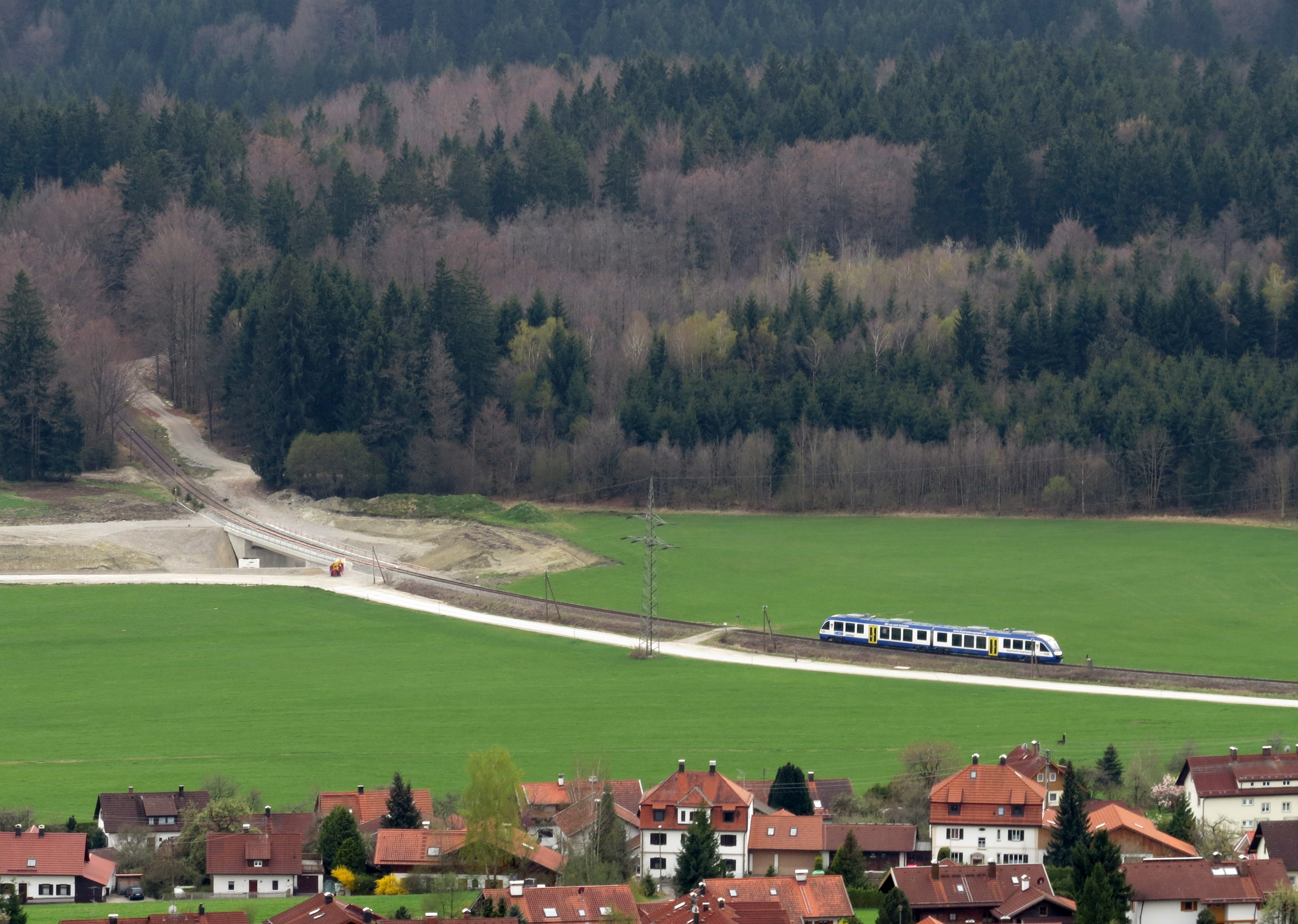
- The line west of Hohenpeißenberg in 2014

Overview
- Line number: 962
- Locale: Upper Bavaria
- Termini: Peißenberg; Schongau
- Stations: 5

Service
- Services: RB 67
- Route number: 5444

Technical
- Line length: 15.5 km (9.6 mi)
- Track gauge: 1,435 mm (4 ft 8 1/2 in) standard gauge

The Schongau–Peißenberg railway is a railway line in Upper Bavaria, Germany. It runs 15.5 kilometres (9.6 mi) from a junction with the Weilheim–Peißenberg railway in Peißenberg to a junction with the Landsberg am Lech–Schongau railway in Schongau.
