= Schongau station =

Railway station in Schongau, Bavaria, Germany

Schongau
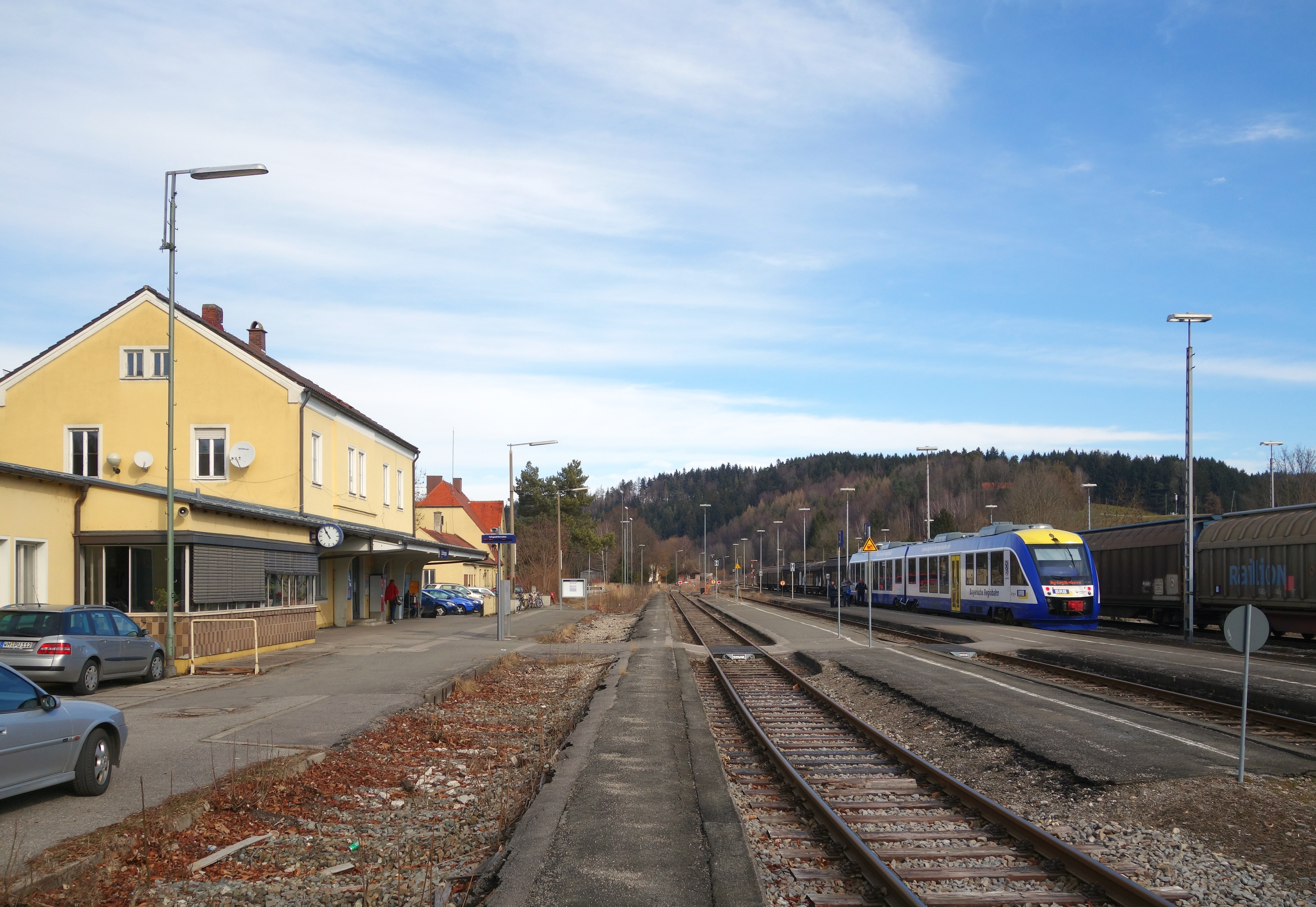
- The station in 2014

General information
- Location: Bahnhofstraße 17; Schongau, Bavaria; Germany
- Coordinates: 47°48′44″N 10°54′09″E
- Owner: DB Netz
- Operator: DB Station&Service
- Lines: Landsberg am Lech–Schongau line; Schongau–Peißenberg line
- Distance: 28.7 km (17.8 mi) from Landsberg (Lech)
- Platforms: 1 island platform
- Tracks: 2
- Train operators: Bayerische Regiobahn
- Connections: Regionalverkehr Oberbayern buses

Other information
- Station code: 5661
- DS100 code: MSGU
- IBNR: 8005418
- Category: 5
- Website: www.bahnhof.de

History
- Opened: 16 November 1886; 139 years ago

Services
Preceding station		Following station
Peiting Nord towards Augsburg-Oberhausen	RB 67	Terminus
Location

Schongau station is a railway station in the town of Schongau, in the district of Weilheim-Schongau in Upper Bavaria, Germany. It is located at the junction of the Landsberg am Lech–Schongau and Schongau–Peißenberg lines of Deutsche Bahn.

== Services ==
As of the December 2021 timetable change, the following services stop at Schongau:

- RB: hourly service to Weilheim (Oberbay); some trains continue from Weilheim to Augsburg-Oberhausen.
