= Adrian Warburton =

British World War II flying ace (1918–1944)

Wing commander Adrian Warburton DSO* DFC**
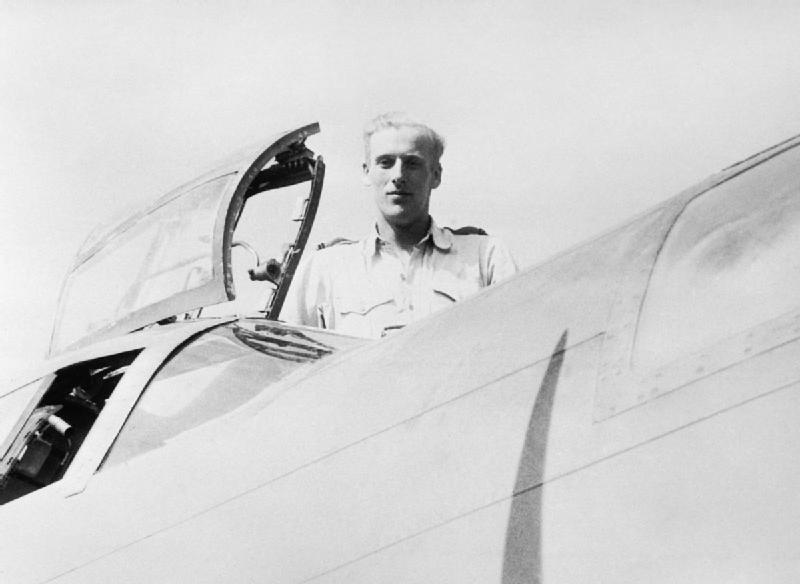
- Flying Officer Adrian Warburton about to enter the cockpit of a Martin Maryland
- Born: 10 March 1918; Middlesbrough, England
- Died: 12 April 1944 (aged 26); Egling an der Paar, Germany
- Burial place: Durnbach Commonwealth War Cemetery, Gmund am Tegernsee, Germany
- Military career
- Allegiance: United Kingdom
- Branch: Royal Air Force
- Service years: 1939–1944
- Rank: Wing commander
- Nickname: Warby
- Units: No 431 Flight & No 2 PRU RAF, Nos 22, 69 & 683 Squadrons RAF, No 336 Wing RAF
- Conflicts: Second World War: Siege of Malta; Allied invasion of Sicily
- Awards: Distinguished Service Order & Bar; Distinguished Flying Cross & Two Bars; Distinguished Flying Cross (United States)

Adrian "Warby" Warburton, DSO & Bar, DFC & Two Bars (10 March 1918 – 12 April 1944) was a Royal Air Force (RAF) pilot and flying ace of the Second World War. He became legendary in the RAF for his role in the defence of Malta and was described by the then Air Officer Commanding in Chief Middle East, Air Marshal Sir Arthur Tedder, as "the most important pilot in the RAF". Warburton was also awarded a United States DFC. Described as 'Six-medal Warburton', all of Warby's gallantry awards were earned while operating from Malta. He remains the most highly decorated RAF photo-reconnaissance pilot of all time.

His life and work has been depicted in the books Warburton's War by Tony Spooner, and Malta's Greater Siege & Adrian Warburton DSO* DFC** DFC (USA) by Paul McDonald. Warburton was also the subject of the BBC Timewatch documentary The Mystery of the Missing Ace. The 1953 film Malta Story features a photo-reconnaissance pilot who may be based on Warburton.

== Early life ==
Adrian Warburton was born in Middlesbrough on 10 March 1918, the only son of Commander Geoffrey Warburton DSO, a highly respected RN submariner, and Muriel Warburton, née Davidson. Adrian was christened on board a submarine in Grand Harbour, Valletta, Malta.

Warburton attended St Edward's School in Oxford, where two other famous airmen, Guy Gibson and Douglas Bader, were also educated. On leaving school, he became an articled clerk with a firm of accountants in Cheapside, London. He joined a local Territorial Army unit on 1 November 1937, joining the RAF a year later on 31 October 1938.

== Second World War ==
=== To Malta 1940 ===
Warburton was commissioned in the Royal Air Force (RAF) an acting pilot officer (on probation) on 3 September 1939 and confirmed as a pilot officer on 31 October. During pilot training, Warburton struggled to achieve the minimum standard. Nevertheless, he was awarded his pilot's flying badge in May 1939. Despite writing off his aircraft's undercarriage in a botched landing, he successfully completed advanced flying training and was posted to a torpedo training course at Gosport in Hampshire at the end of August 1939. He was then posted to No 22 Squadron, RAF Thorney Island, on 12 October 1939, which was operating ancient, single-engine Vickers Vildebeest biplanes. The squadron was in the process of being equipped with the advanced Bristol Beaufort torpedo bomber. Warburton's weaknesses on twin-engine aircraft were all too apparent and no attempt was made to convert him onto the Beaufort.

In April 1940, 22 Squadron moved to RAF North Coates in Lincolnshire and was involved in mine-laying operations, night bombing of enemy ports and, in May, daylight raids to try and stem the tide of the German Blitzkrieg. The squadron commander failed to return from a mission. Warburton did not fly operationally, and his few flying hours were mostly split between the Vildebeest and the Hawker Audax. He was then sent on a navigation and reconnaissance course at RAF Squire's Gate, Blackpool, which lasted until September 1940.

On his return to RAF North Coates, his new squadron commander, Wing Commander Jos Braithwaite, had been giving Warburton's future some thought. This was not simply because of Warburton's problems in the air. Braithwaite was aware Warburton had debts and may have heard rumours of 'woman trouble', although he had no idea of the extent of Warburton's deception. Against regulations, Warburton had married in secret in October 1939. An unlikely solution presented itself.

Australian Flight Lieutenant "Tich" Whiteley had been tasked with delivering three American-built Martin Maryland aircraft to Malta to be used for reconnaissance. Each aircraft had a crew of three: a pilot, an observer or navigator, and a Wireless Operator/Air Gunner (WOp/AG). With few specialist navigators available, pilots with navigation training were considered. One was Warburton, the other was Paddy Devine. Taking two pilots in place of two navigators also gave Tich more flexibility. This was a fortuitous decision. Tich said later, 'Warburton had already demonstrated to me that he was a capable and reliable officer just looking for a challenge.' The new unit created was 431 Flight.

The three aircraft left for Malta on 6 September, with Warburton as navigator in the second. The next Maryland did not reach Malta until October. A fifth was shot down on the way in November. Intense training alongside operations began immediately. The first operational mission was to Tripoli, with Warburton as navigator. Tich then began training Devine and Warburton as Maryland pilots, a task made easier as the navigator sat in front of the pilot and had a set of flying controls. Devine was soon operational, but Warburton struggled on take-off and landing. On his first solo, he landed crosswind, trailing wire behind him from RAF Luqa's perimeter fence. He then completed a savage ground-loop, an uncontrollable swing through almost 360 degrees. This was witnessed by an irate wing commander, and Tich was firmly reprimanded for risking a precious aircraft in the hands of such a "ham-fisted idiot". Warburton found himself back in the navigator's seat.

Two 431 pilots, were laid low with "Malta Dog", a stomach complaint similar to dysentery. Tich had no choice but to use Warburton. His take-off was so bad it tore a wheel off the aircraft (AR712), forcing an immediate emergency landing. Tich then took the unusual step of asking observer Sergeant Frank Bastard and WOp/AG Sergeant Paddy Moren if they were willing to continue flying with Warburton. They thought he was full of guts and said yes. After some high-speed taxiing practice, Warburton was airborne within three days as a pilot, with Frank and Paddy. He went on to fly 20 missions in October. On 30 October, he shot down an Italian seaplane. Publicly, Tich was critical, as Warburton had risked a precious reconnaissance aircraft, but privately, he was rather pleased. To encourage the staff assembling Marylands at RAF Burtonwood, Tich sent them a message: "Your friend Mr Martin doing very nicely out here. Did some boxing yesterday and won by a knock-out." Two days later, during combat with another seaplane and three Italian fighters, a bullet hit Warburton's instrument panel before penetrating his harness and striking him in the chest. One engine caught fire. But the seaplane was destroyed, and one fighter shot down. Warburton extracted the bullet on his way back to Luqa and had it mounted on a wristband. The man who became known as "Warby" began to emerge.

431 Flight was sent to Malta following pressure from the Commander-in-Chief (C-in-C) Mediterranean, Admiral Cunningham, who wanted "eyes" on the powerful and modern Italian battle fleet. Cunningham had a plan to strike a blow at the Italians in their base at Taranto in southern Italy, but he needed up-to-date intelligence first. November was therefore busy for 431 Flight, with two Maryland missions to Taranto each day. On 3 November, 431 reported three battleships at Taranto; four days later there were four. The most important sorties were flown on 10 and 11 November, two on each day. Tich flew the first on 10 November, Warburton the second. Warburton's aircraft was subject to intense flak and intercepted by an Italian CR.42 fighter which took twenty minutes to shake off. Frank Bastard confirmed that photographs of the Italian fleet were taken on this sortie. These were crucial: "An aircraft from Illustrious working from Malta then picked up full details of the enemy’s dispositions, together with photographs showing the anti-torpedo nets and barrage balloons, and it was in the light of these that the Swordfish crews planned their attack." The pilot of the morning sortie on 11 November was Paddy Devine. That afternoon, Warburton flew with John Spires as navigator. The sortie was abortive photographically because of low cloud, but that did not stop Warburton. Years later, Spires said Warburton told him they were going in at zero feet, and he was to get a sharp pencil and plenty of paper to plot the ships on the harbour map. Spires and the WOp/AG expressed their response in a single word. "The weather was so bad the birds were walking, and the fish were at anchor. But nothing, absolutely nothing, could get in the way of what Warby wanted to do that day." They achieved complete surprise, low cloud having deterred the Italians from raising their balloon barrage. The Maryland crew did their best to count and note the names of the major warships and escaped unscathed, having flown twice around the outer harbour. When comparing notes, there was a discrepancy in the number of battleships: they counted six; there should only have been five. With no photographic evidence, Warburton decided to go back. But they had lost the element of surprise and were quickly spotted. Despite the intense flak, they agreed on only five battleships, along with 14 cruisers and 27 destroyers. The Fleet Air Arm launched their attack that night, which became known as the Battle of Taranto.

The morning after the battle, Tich Whiteley, newly promoted to squadron leader, reported one battleship partially submerged and another beached. Oil was pouring from many other ships and the harbour was in chaos. Admiral Cunningham wrote to Air Commodore Maynard, Air Officer Commanding (AOC) Malta, on 14 November thanking him:

I hasten to write you a line to thank you for the most valuable reconnaissance work carried out by your squadrons, without which the successful attack on Taranto would have been impossible. I well know what long monotonous flying time they have to put in and I am very grateful to them. The work over Taranto has been particularly valuable and gave us all we wanted to know. Good luck and my grateful thanks again for your cooperation

In a single stroke, the balance of power in the Mediterranean had been altered. Announcing news to the House of Commons, Churchill spoke of "this glorious episode". Cunningham's despatch on the operation, published in 1947, said the success of the Fleet Air Arm attack was due in no small part to the excellent reconnaissance provided by 431 Flight under very difficult conditions and often in the face of fighter opposition.

Warburton played an important part over Taranto, but some accounts unnecessarily embellish his involvement at the expense of the other crews. The success was that of 431 Flight, led by Tich Whiteley. Nevertheless, his performance formed the basis of a growing reputation. This gave his confidence an enormous boost. A legend began to develop and, from then on, it appeared as though Warburton could do no wrong. In mid-December he attacked a surfaced U-boat, and on Christmas Eve he shot down an Italian SM.75. On 27 December, he was awarded a Distinguished Flying Cross (DFC) and his two sergeants, Frank Bastard and Paddy Moren, were each awarded the Distinguished Flying Medal (DFM).

=== 1941 ===
Warburton was promoted to flying officer on 3 January 1941. On 10 January 1941, 431 Flight was designated 69 Squadron, with Tich Whiteley in command. On paper, the squadron had twelve Marylands, but was short of spares and on some days only one aircraft was ready to fly. Later the same month, the citation for Warburton's Distinguished Flying Cross (DFC) was published in The London Gazette:

This officer has carried out numerous long distance reconnaissance flights and has taken part in eight air combats. In October, 1940, he destroyed an aircraft, and again, early in December, he shot down an enemy bomber in flames. Flying Officer Warburton has at all times displayed a fine sense of devotion to duty.

Most reconnaissance aircraft, built for speed and a high ceiling, were unarmed to reduce weight. But the American Maryland, built primarily as a light bomber, had forward- and rear-facing guns, enabling Warburton and his crew's success in air combat. He achieved his 50th operational mission in February. His reputation of always returning with the goods was now well-established, and he was often selected for special tasks, constantly varying his tactics to achieve the best results. Sometimes he flew at height, and on others extremely low. He took photographs of the Tragino viaduct near Calitri in southern Italy, the target for an experimental raid by paratroopers. Some of his photographs before and after the raid were taken from the near-suicidal height of 25 feet (7.6 m). He located numerous enemy convoys supplying Axis forces in North Africa. Much was made of "Warby’s luck", but it was also used to protect the existence of another intelligence source: Ultra. Warburton was not always taken at his word, so heavy was the layer of secrecy, as illustrated when he reported an Italian ship by name and the harbour in which it was berthed. The RN did not accept the report. A few days later, he presented the senior service with a photograph of the ship, taken so low and at such close range its name could clearly be read.

Personal appearance and dress on 69 Squadron were important to Tich Whiteley, who thought his officers should set the right example. After Tich left Malta, things changed, as it became nearly impossible to obtain replacement items of uniform. Warburton's attire became an expression of his individuality and he often wore an army battledress blouse with his RAF rank on slides on the shoulder tabs. He wore a cravat rather than a tie, and rarely wore uniform shoes. This was very much against the RAF "norm", even in those trying days in Malta. He continued to foster a special, almost unique, relationship with the airmen, which he had begun as soon as he arrived in Malta. Tich had always encouraged his aircrew to help in servicing their aircraft, but Warburton went further, befriending many. To him, the airmen were equals and, in their turn, many became devoted to him. Whenever he flew to Egypt, he invariably asked the airmen if there was anything they wanted him to bring back. One of his ground crew in 1941 was 20-year old Leading Aircraftman (LAC) Jack Vowles from Halifax. Of Warby, Jack said, "He wasn't boastful or overpowering - but overall, he was a most exceptional man."

On 14 April 1941, Warburton's Maryland was mistaken for a Ju 88 and attacked by a Hurricane flown by Flying Officer Innes Westmacott. Warby had to force-land wheels-up. Later, he photographed the entire 250-mile (400 km) length of the coast road from Benghazi to Tripoli. It was thought the task would take six sorties to complete. Warburton did it in one, with every yard photographed and no breaks in coverage. During the flight, he was chased out to sea four times by enemy fighters, but returned to his task after shaking off his pursuers. Being mistaken for a Ju 88 sometimes had its advantages. On the same mission, with Frank Bastard and Paddy Moren, he also attacked a new Axis airstrip at Misurata they had discovered three days earlier. He first joined the traffic pattern and was given a "green" to land. According to Frank, they overflew the airstrip at a height of 15 feet (4.6 m), leaving three Italian bombers in flames.

By the summer of 1941, Warburton was living on his nerves. He was also perceived by many who did not know him as a "loner" who did not mix in the officers' mess. But he was desperately short of money, as, at Tich's instigation, much of his pay was going toward debts he had run up in the UK. Many were jealous of Warburton's access to senior officers, and in particular the new AOC, Air Vice-Marshal Hugh Lloyd, who gave him free rein. Some considered him irresponsible and reckless. But his access to senior officers was because of the secret nature of his work, while those who knew him recognised the risks he took were calculated.

In September 1941, Warburton was awarded a Bar to his DFC. He and Sergeants Bastard and Moren were then posted to Egypt for a rest, leaving Malta on 1 October 1941. By then, he had flown 116 operational missions. He would be back. He would see in New Year 1942 in Malta in a Bristol Beaufighter, and as a war substantive flight lieutenant.

=== 1942 ===
On his "rest tour", Warby promptly had his posting changed from No. 233 Squadron, a training unit, to No. 2 Photo Reconnaissance Unit (PRU). When 2 PRU acquired two Beaufighters, its commander, Squadron Leader Hugh McPhail, had them stripped of guns, cannon, and other equipment, to increase their speed and ceiling. By mid-November, Warburton was on operations over Crete. Both aircraft were then detached to Malta. Within 24 hours, he was revisiting his old haunts including Tripoli, all of Sicily, and southern Italy, once again under the direct control of Air Vice-Marshal Hugh Lloyd. Lloyd later described Warburton as "the absolute king of photographic reconnaissance, the pearl of the Mediterranean." "Warby’s luck" continued when he was attacked by a Hurricane. He said it was rather a poor show, as he only found one bullet hole, in his aircraft's left aileron.

To the photographers who flew with him, Warburton showed no outward sign of fear. On 13 February 1942, he conducted a reconnaissance of Taranto accompanied by Corporal Ron Hadden, who said it took them two attempts to penetrate the harbour because of low cloud. Once inside, he flew three runs at 50 feet (15 m), despite intense flak. The armour-plated door dividing the front cockpit from Hadden's position was blown open. Warburton was sitting calmly, with a cigarette stuck in the corner of his mouth, his elbows propped up on the sides of the cockpit, and with his beloved service cap pulled over his flying helmet. One engine had been damaged and the other was running hot. The squadron Operational Readiness Book recorded that they had taken photographs of two battleships, nine submarines, two destroyers, one torpedo boat, a hospital ship, and a merchant ship. Warburton also reported on four battleships, four cruisers, six to eight destroyers, and nine merchant ships. With the port engine shut down owing to oil failure, they were then chased by four Macchi C.202 fighters, which they evaded. On the way home, Warburton reported the presence of three cruisers, four destroyers and five merchant ships at Messina. He then spotted another hospital ship south of Reggio di Calabria.

Warburton's detachment to Malta ended in mid-March 1942. He had flown 43 missions and produced some of the most important photographs of his career. Three weeks later, he was listed in the London Gazette as being awarded the Distinguished Service Order (DSO). He had been a flight lieutenant for just two months. The two camera operators, Corporal Ron Hadden and Leading Aircraftman Norman Shirley were each awarded DFMs, making them unique, as they were not aircrew.

His second "rest period" was much like the first. On a flight in an old biplane, the aircraft's engine failed over the desert. Warburton force-landed, then walked out, earning the unofficial "flying boot" emblem, which he wore on his left breast pocket. Of great significance was a flight, his first, in a PR Spitfire with which 2 PRU were being equipped. From May, he flew them almost exclusively, covering Greece and Crete and many of the Greek islands. He also often photographed the coastal road along which Rommel was advancing toward Egypt. By 11 August, he was on his way back to Malta, in a PR Spitfire. He arrived in the middle of Operation Pedestal, a vital convoy for Malta. The following day, he checked up on the Italian fleet at Taranto on two separate missions. Promoted to squadron leader, he took command of 69 Squadron. Under the new AOC, Air Vice-Marshal Keith Park, 69 Squadron expanded into three flights, each operating a different type of aircraft: the Baltimore, Spitfire, and Wellington. Warburton was awarded a second Bar to his DFC in October.

On 15 November, Warburton was shot down over Tunisia. He was able to crash-land at Bône, captured by the Allies three days earlier. He was greeted by recently arrived Spitfire pilots of 111 Squadron. Their squadron commander was perplexed by the long-haired, flamboyantly dressed, reconnaissance pilot showing no rank, but wearing medal ribbons that would make any pilot stand out. Having made his way to Gibraltar, Warburton borrowed a Spitfire fighter to fly back to Bône to pick up his undamaged camera magazine. He then shot down a Ju 88 on his way back to Luqa. On arrival on 21 November, he was met by Luqa's Station Commander, Group Captain Le May. Warburton apologised for being late. Le May then told him he had been promoted to wing commander. He was 24 years old and had been a squadron leader for only three months. Warburton took his film to be developed six days after taking off on his original mission.

=== 1943 ===
By 1943, a new Warburton had emerged. His longer than regulation hair was gone and his flamboyant dress, at the least on the ground, was a thing of the past. By February, 69 Squadron was enormous, and was split into three squadrons. The PR flight became 683 Squadron, with him in command. Soon afterwards, he met Elliott Roosevelt, son of US President Franklin D. Roosevelt. Elliot commanded all US photo-reconnaissance units in North Africa, and he and Warby developed a close friendship. It was to have fateful consequences.

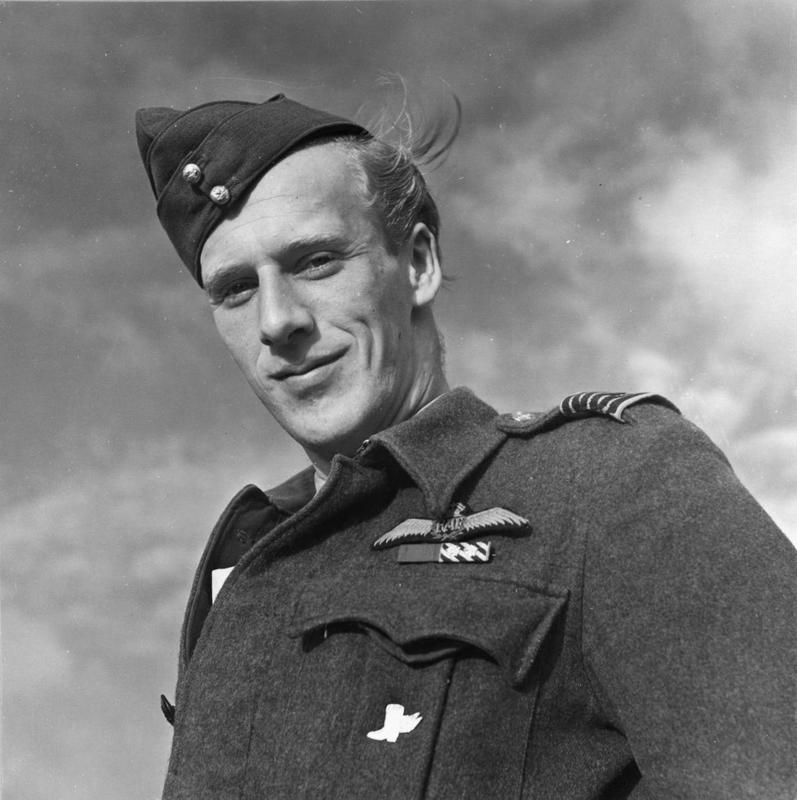
Warburton during his time as commander of No. 683 Squadron

One of the newcomers to Warburton's squadron was 20-year-old Canadian William Keir Carr, known as Bill. When he reported to Warburton, he found him in a revetment shack, stretched out on a table drinking tea surrounded by airmen. Carr soon recognised Warburton's leadership as inspirational. He was no longer the loner of his early days in Malta. He personally flew all the missions targeting the heavily defended island of Pantelleria. Keith Durbridge, one of 683 Squadron's pilots, later remarked that Warburton was the only pilot he ever heard of who was fired at by anti-aircraft batteries from above. His photographs allowed Allied planners to pinpoint every defensive location, which were then subjected to a merciless bombardment. As soon as the invading force (Operation Corkscrew) was sighted, Pantelleria's garrison surrendered. Warby also undertook the photography of the landing beaches for the Allied invasion of Sicily. He covered all four missions from a height of 200 feet (61 m). Hugh O'Neil flew the fighter escort and commented that Warburton was undeterred by the flak, simply smoking a large cigar as he went about his task. "The vertical and low oblique photographs of the coastline, which General Patton considered 'essential to the success of the operation', were of the highest value to the whole force." All had been taken by Warburton. The C-in-C Middle East, General Harold Alexander, signalled Malta, asking that Warburton be thanked personally. In late July, he was awarded a Bar to his DSO.

But others were noting changes in him. He still flew more than a normal squadron commander and continued to take the most dangerous missions. He exercised his responsibility over his subordinates well, but he was long overdue a genuine rest tour. There were signs he was becoming weary and edgy.

On 10 September, the Italian fleet, photographed so many times by him, arrived in Malta to formally surrender. A week later, he paraded with 683 Squadron for the final time. He left Malta on 1 October, having been in command of a squadron on continuous war operations for 14 months. This was highly unusual. But he was not posted to a rest tour. He was to become the first commanding officer of a newly formed RAF North African photo-reconnaissance wing. It comprised 682 and 683 Squadrons, equipped with PR Spitfires, and 60 (South African Air Force) Squadron, flying PR Mosquitos. The wing was based at La Marsa in Tunisia. Soon afterwards, Warburton was awarded a US Distinguished Flying Cross for his exceptional work at Pantelleria and Sicily, although it was not gazetted until mid-January 1944.

On 26 November 1943, at La Marsa, his vehicle was hit by a truck which failed to stop, leaving him seriously injured with a broken pelvis. He was expected to be hospitalised for three months, with the lower part of his body encased in plaster. On 27 December, still in his hospital bed, he was relieved of command of 336 Wing.

=== 1944 ===
Warby was a consummate planner. He told his father Elliot Roosevelt was moving on and he hoped to accompany him. Roosevelt commanded the 90th Reconnaissance Wing (the size of an RAF group), which included 336 Wing. The group was in the process of moving to San Severo, on the Foggia Plain in southern Italy. Canadian Bill Carr from 683 Squadron described what Warburton then did:

Growing tired of being bed-ridden, he climbed out of the window, "borrowed" a vehicle, and made his way to the airport. There, he located some old friends who helped him cut off his cast. He borrowed shorts and a shirt, and a Mark IX Spit from a friendly squadron commander, and flew to see use of his old squadron, now located in Italy.

Warburton had no parachute and no maps. The aircraft had no oxygen, yet he coped with clouds which topped out at 25,000 feet (7,600 m). The following day, he visited old friends on 683 Squadron at San Severo.

Not long afterwards, General Eisenhower requested Elliot Roosevelt's transfer to England, along with key personnel from 90th Wing, to set up a new reconnaissance wing. Warburton was one of those chosen, although officially he was still listed as "sick". The new wing was the 325th Reconnaissance Wing based at the 8th Army Air Force HQ at High Wycombe. One of the subordinate units was the American 7th Photo-Recce Group (PRG) at RAF Mount Farm near Oxford. On 1 April 1944, Warby was posted as the RAF Liaison Officer to the 7th PRG. It is unclear how much the American authorities had known of his medical category, as he had been at Mount Farm since late January or early February.

He was the pilot of one of two Lockheed F-5B photo-reconnaissance aircraft (a version of the Lockheed P-38 Lightning fighter) that took off together from Mount Farm on the morning of 12 April 1944 to photograph targets in Germany. Although, as a liaison officer, Warburton should not have been flying operations, and his flight in a P-38 had been opposed by 7th PRG's commander, Lieutenant Colonel George Lawson, it was approved by Lawson's superior, Elliot Roosevelt. The aircraft separated approximately 100 miles (160 km) north of Munich to carry out their respective tasks; it was planned that they would meet before heading south. Warburton would not be seen again until his body and the wreckage of his aircraft were finally unearthed in Germany, fifty-eight years later.

=== Private life ===
Warburton married Eileen Adelaide Mitchell, known as Betty, on 28 October 1939. He was 21 and had known her for only a few weeks. She was 27, a divorcee with a nine-year-old daughter in her parents' care. Warburton did not tell his parents of the marriage, then or later, and in a clear breach of regulations, did not inform the RAF. He never altered his RAF next-of-kin forms, which named his father. Although he rented a bungalow near Thorney Island where he was based, he virtually ignored his new wife, visited rarely, and lived in the officers' mess, as required by RAF regulations. In later years, Mrs Warburton said they never lived together. In July 1940, on hearing he was in Blackpool, she travelled there to agree to a divorce. They met, but divorce papers were never served. She never saw Warburton again.

By the time Warburton returned to North Coates, his complicated personal life was unravelling. He was in serious debt and his future as an officer looked bleak. He was then sent to Malta. However, the RAF was not ignoring his situation. His commanding officer in Malta, Tich Whiteley, arranged to have part of his pay stopped in the UK to go toward his debts. Three years later, while on leave in England, Warburton met Tich and learnt that not only were all his debts paid, but there was a significant credit balance. He attempted to leave half of the remainder in an envelope for Tich to open after he left. Tich simply deposited the money back into Warburton's bank account.

Warburton met Christina Ratcliffe in Floriana, Malta, on the evening of 24 January 1941. They soon became recognised by many as Malta's "golden couple". Ratcliffe was a dancer stranded in Malta and a founder member of the Whizz Bangs concert party which entertained troops. She became a civilian plotter working for the RAF, later captain of her watch and assistant controller. She was decorated in 1943. After Warburton left Malta in October 1943, she never saw him again. She stayed in Malta, never married, and died there in 1988. George Lawson, who commanded the 7th PRG and reluctantly authorised Warburton's last sortie said, "Warby told me he was going to San Severo in Italy and had no intention of going to Sardinia. He may have had it in mind going back to Malta from San Severo to see his old girlfriend." Christina's story was featured in the short musical play Star of Strait Street, by Philip Glassborow, which opened in Valletta in 2017, and she is the central character in the book Ladies of Lascaris, by Paul McDonald, published in 2018.

=== Death and legacy ===
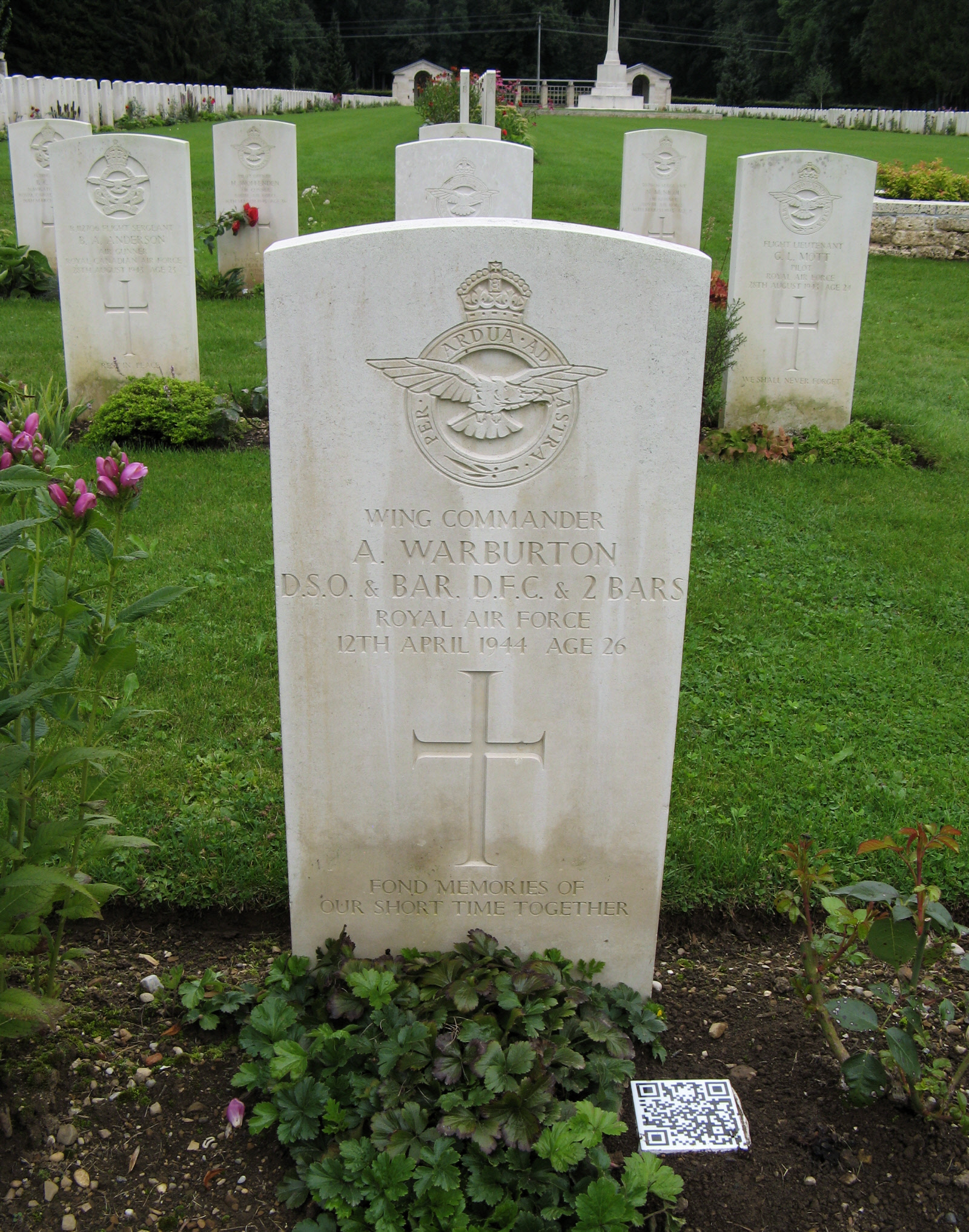
The grave of Wing Commander Adrian Warburton at Durnbach War Cemetery in Gmund am Tegernsee, Germany.

When he went missing, Warburton had just turned 26 years old. He was a wing commander and his gallantry had been recognised by the award of the Distinguished Service Order and Bar, the Distinguished Flying Cross and two Bars and an American Distinguished Flying Cross. He had flown nearly 400 operations and claimed nine enemy aircraft destroyed.

Bill Carr, the young Canadian who joined 683 Squadron in 1943, went on to become a lieutenant general in the Royal Canadian Air Force. He has been described as the father of the modern Canadian Air Force. He said that:

Warburton's "charisma was unlike any I ever experienced. While none of us ever hoped to achieve his level of competence as a pilot or his prowess against the enemy, we sincerely hoped for his approval. And this he was wont to give generously when it was justified. How hard we young pilots tried to achieve this may be reflected in the unique achievements of 683 during his tenure as CO. The groundcrew too worked like slaves; indeed I believe they loved the man. Warby was a unique officer in a great many ways. Not only was he a very brave person, braver than any I have ever met, but also he was a warm and sensitive human being who tried to hide these facets in his make-up. He had the mark of a great leader. He inspired his colleagues and his subordinates to achieve goals most would not have thought themselves capable of achieving. His disappearance brought disbelief and sadness and generated such a sense of loss and regret in wartime as to be remembered. We lost a great leader; the RAF and the allies: one of the very best.

Years of speculation about Warburton's fate came to an end in 2002, when his remains were found with his aircraft, buried about 2 yards (1.8 m) deep in a field near the Bavarian village of Egling an der Paar, 34 miles (55 km) west of Munich. According to witnesses, the aircraft fell there on 12 April 1944, around 11:45. One of the propellers had bullet holes in it, which suggests that Warburton had been shot down. Parts of the wreck can be seen today in the Malta Aviation Museum. Only a few pieces of bone and the odd part of flying clothing were found. As Warburton was flying an F-5B Lightning—a USAAF plane with USAAF markings—he was mistaken for an American pilot. Most of Warburton's body was removed from the P-38. Rumours persisted locally that the remains were buried in a grave at St Johannes Baptist Church in Kaufering, which already contained seven airmen from an RAF Halifax shot down the previous year. After the war, they were subsequently reburied at Dürnbach, a parish of Gmund am Tegernsee.

A memorial service for Wing Commander Adrian Warburton DSO* DFC** DFC (USA) was held on 14 May 2003, in St Agidius Parish Church, Gmund am Tegernsee, followed by burial with full military honours at the Durnbach Commonwealth War Cemetery. The ceremony was attended by his widow, Betty, and Jack Vowles, a former comrade who had served with him in Malta in 1941. Vowles placed a single rose on the coffin, from Christina:

She'd been gone a while by then bless her. No one else thought about doing such a thing. She never came back to Britain. She waited for him there.

Warburton was the subject of the "Mystery of the Missing Ace" episode of the BBC investigative documentary series Timewatch, first broadcast in November 2003.

Constance Babington Smith, head of the Central Interpretation Unit at RAF Medmenham in Buckinghamshire, summed him up thusly:

The photographic pilot has to have all the accuracy of the bomber pilot, as well as the alertness and tactical skill of the fighter pilot. In addition, he must be an individualist who can make quick responsible decisions entirely on his own. And he must have the persistent purpose and the endurance not only to reach his target but to bring back the photographs to his base. In all these things Warburton excelled … . The names of Bader and Gibson are rightly famous, but the name of Adrian Warburton has hardly been heard outside the circle of those who actually knew him, and there is no single mention of him in the official RAF history of the Second World War.
