= Türkenfeld =

- Municipality
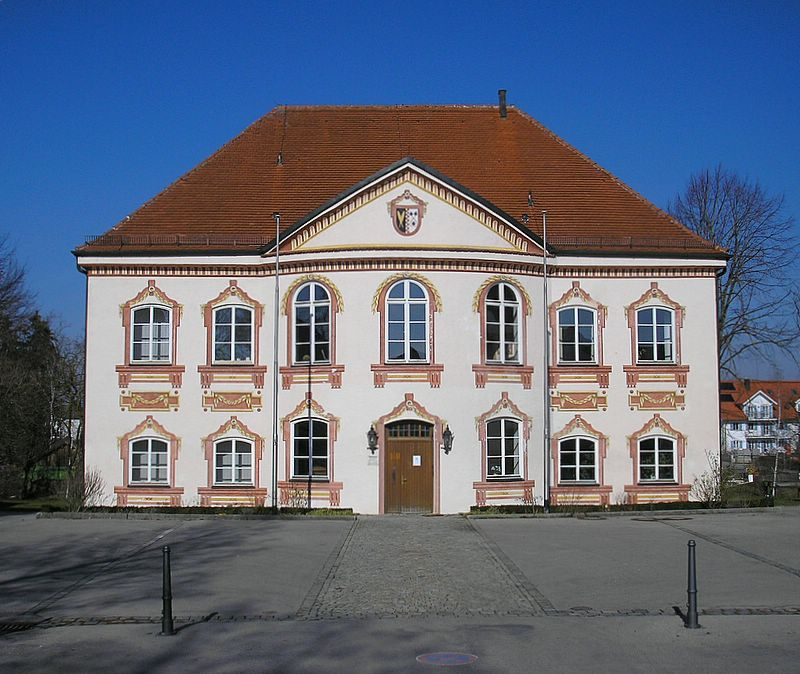
- The former palace, now domicile of the local government

- Coat of arms

- Location of Türkenfeld within Fürstenfeldbruck district
- Interactive map of Türkenfeld
- Location within Germany Location within Bavaria
- Coordinates: 48°07′N 11°05′E
- Country: Germany
- State: Bavaria
- Admin. region: Oberbayern
- District: Fürstenfeldbruck
- Subdivisions: 6 Ortsteile

Government
  - Mayor (2020–26): Emanuel Staffler (CSU)

Area
  - Total: 15.95 km^{2} (6.16 sq mi)
- Elevation: 599 m (1,965 ft)

Population (2025-12-31)
  - Total: 3,626
  - Density: 227.3/km^{2} (588.8/sq mi)
- Time zone: UTC+01:00 (CET)
  - Summer (DST): UTC+02:00 (CEST)
- Postal codes: 82299
- Dialling codes: 08193
- Vehicle registration: FFB
- Website: www.tuerkenfeld.de

Türkenfeld (German pronunciation: [ˈtʏʁkn̩ˌfɛlt]) is a municipality in the district of Fürstenfeldbruck, Bavaria, Germany.

== Geography ==
Türkenfeld is located about 14 km south-west of Fürstenfeldbruck and 37 km west of Munich. The municipality has incorporated the communities of Burgholz, Klotzau, Türkenfeld, Peutenmühle, Pleitmannswang, and Zankenhausen.

== History ==
The first evidence of settlement is a burial place dating from Neolithic. In the area of Türkenfeld one can also find several Tumuli from about 1500 BC.

The first written reference is in the Breves Notatiae of 749 as "Duringveld".

During World War II, a subcamp of Dachau concentration camp was built in the town, though it was never put into operation due to construction failures.

== Infrastructure ==
Public facilities in Türkenfeld comprise a kindergarten, a primary school, and a Hauptschule as well as a natatorium. There are also several restaurants in the town.

The Türkenfeld railway station is located at the Munich–Buchloe railway and is served by the of the Munich S-Bahn.
