= Grafrath station =

Railway station in Bavaria, Germany

Grafrath
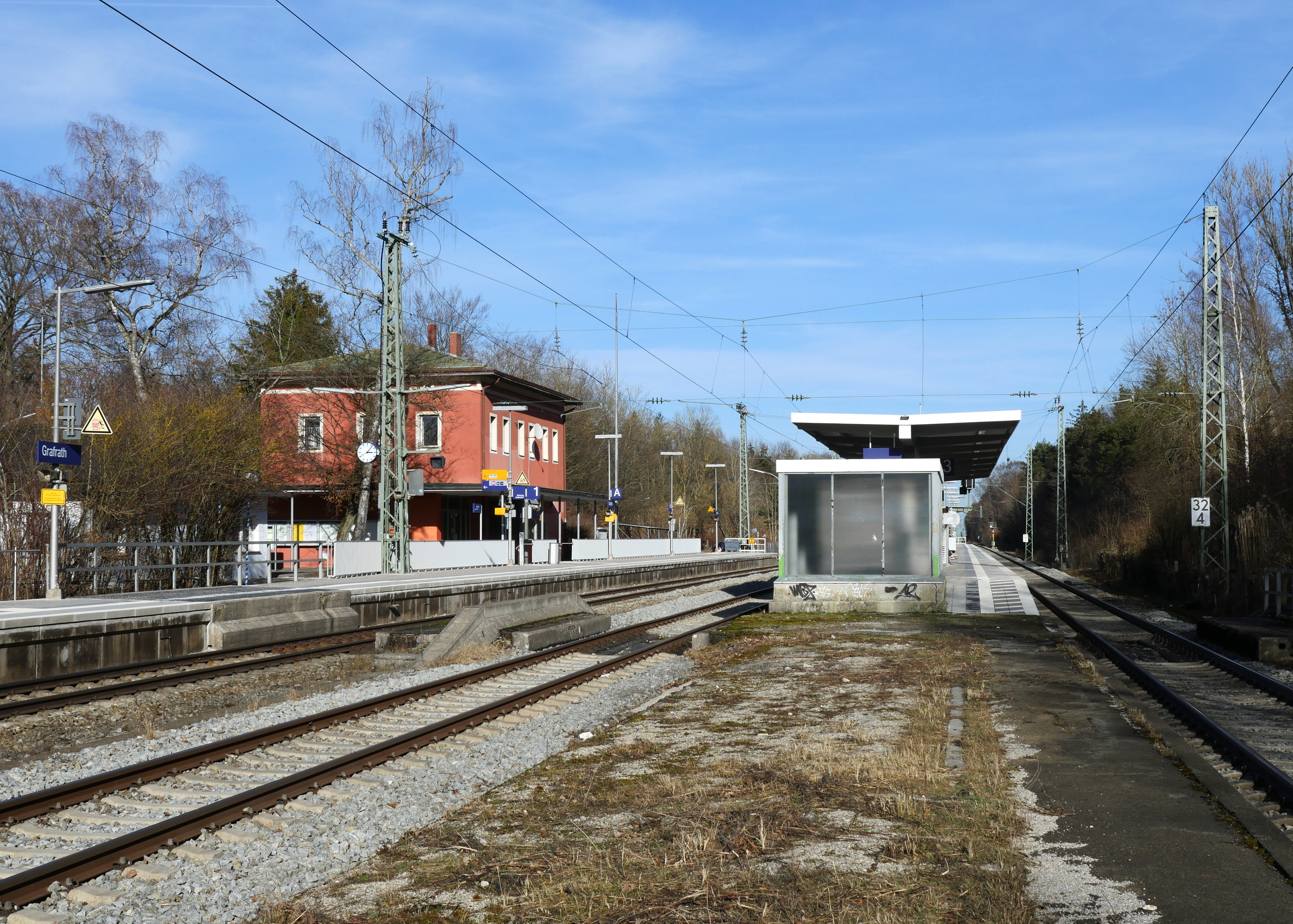
- 2021

General information
- Location: Bahnhofstraße 98; 82284 Grafrath; Bavaria; Germany
- Coordinates: 48°07′56″N 11°09′10″E
- System: Bf
- Owner: Deutsche Bahn
- Operator: DB Station&Service
- Lines: Munich–Buchloe railway (KBS 970)
- Platforms: 1 island platform 1 side platform
- Tracks: 3
- Train operators: S-Bahn München
- Connections: 804, 805, 826, 8200, 8400

Construction
- Parking: yes
- Cycle facilities: yes
- Accessible: partly

Other information
- Station code: 2243
- DS100 code: MGF
- IBNR: 8002351
- Category: 5
- Fare zone: : 3 and 4
- Website: www.bahnhof.de

History
- Opened: 1 May 1873; 153 years ago

Services
Preceding station	Munich S-Bahn	Following station
Türkenfeld towards Geltendorf	S4	Schöngeising towards Ebersberg
Türkenfeld towards Geltendorf	S20 Limited service	Schöngeising towards Höllriegelskreuth
Location
- Location within Bavaria Location within Germany Location within Europe

Grafrath station (German: Bahnhof Grafrath) is a railway station in the municipality of Grafrath, located in the Fürstenfeldbruck district in Bavaria, Germany.
