= Fürstenfeldbruck station =

Railway station in Bavaria, Germany

Fürstenfeldbruck
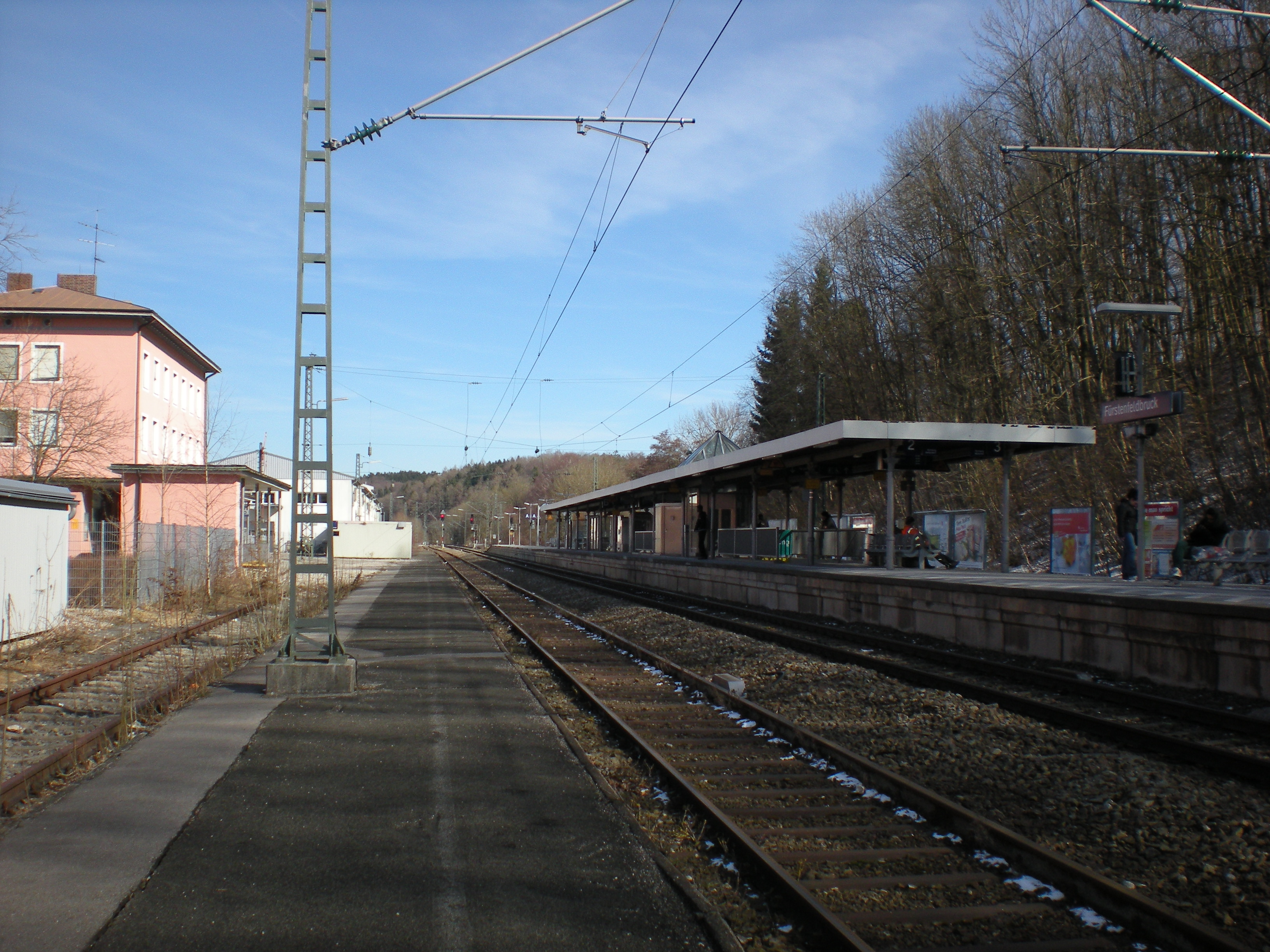
- 2013

General information
- Location: Bahnhofstraße 24; 82256 Fürstenfeldbruck; Bavaria; Germany
- Coordinates: 48.1720°N 11.2621°E
- Owner: Deutsche Bahn
- Operator: DB Netz; DB Station&Service
- Lines: Munich–Buchloe railway (KBS 970)
- Platforms: 1 island platform 1 side platform
- Tracks: 3
- Train operators: S-Bahn München
- Connections: 822, 823, 825, 839, 840, 843, 845, 852, 862, 873, 8000, 8200, 8300, 8400, 8500, 8700, 8800, X850, X900

Construction
- Parking: yes
- Cycle facilities: yes
- Accessible: yes

Other information
- Station code: 1977
- DS100 code: MFB
- IBNR: 8002141
- Category: 4
- Fare zone: : 2 and 3
- Website: www.bahnhof.de

Services
Preceding station	DB Regio Bayern	Following station
Geltendorf towards Buchloe	RB 74	Munich-Pasing towards München Hbf
Preceding station	Munich S-Bahn	Following station
Buchenau (Oberbay) towards Geltendorf	S4	Eichenau (Oberbay) towards Ebersberg
Buchenau (Oberbay) towards Geltendorf	S20 Limited service	Eichenau (Oberbay) towards Höllriegelskreuth
Location
- Location within Bavaria Location within Germany Location within Europe

Fürstenfeldbruck station (German: Bahnhof Fürstenfeldbruck) is a railway station in the municipality of Fürstenfeldbruck, located in the Fürstenfeldbruck district in Bavaria, Germany.

The station, which went into operation with the opening of the railway line on 1 May 1873, had a station building, three platform tracks and extensive goods loading facilities. The tracks for freight traffic were demolished in the 1980s. Today there are still three platform tracks here, which are located at a house and a middle platform. The station building is still preserved. The platforms are connected by an underpass. Since the opening of the S-Bahn network in 1972, the station was only rarely served by regional trains. Beginning in early 2022, Fürstenfeldbruck was added as a stop to some trains of the hourly regional line RB 74. With the redevelopment of the train station, Fürstenfeldbruck was added as a permanent stop on the RB 74 in early December 2022.
