= Geltendorf =

- Municipality
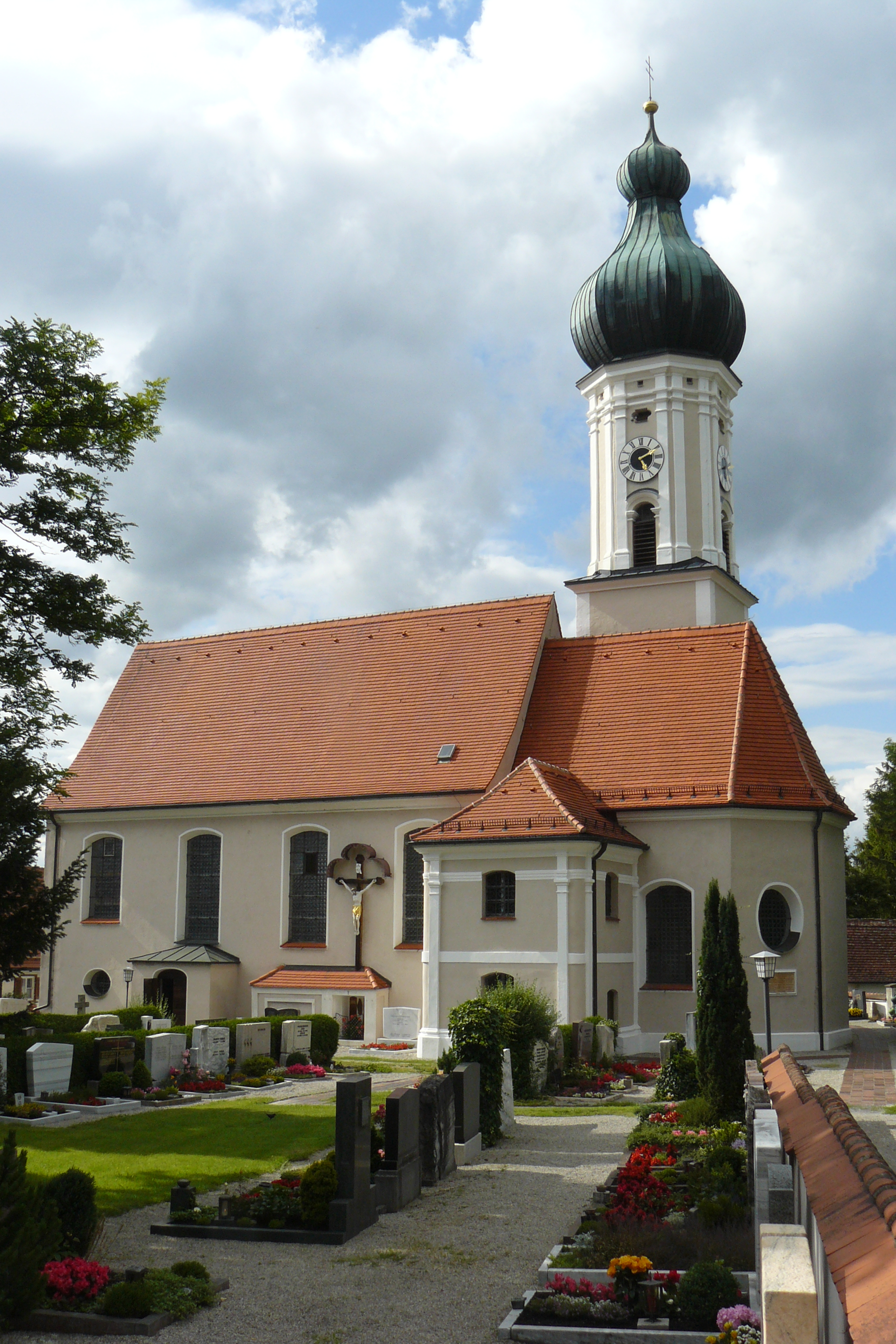
- Church of Saint Stephen

- Coat of arms

- Location of Geltendorf within Landsberg am Lech district
- Interactive map of Geltendorf
- Location within Germany Location within Bavaria
- Coordinates: 48°7′20″N 11°1′40″E
- Country: Germany
- State: Bavaria
- Admin. region: Oberbayern
- District: Landsberg am Lech
- Subdivisions: 8 Ortsteile

Government
  - Mayor (2020–26): Robert Sedlmayr (ÖDP)

Area
  - Total: 34.81 km^{2} (13.44 sq mi)
- Elevation: 603 m (1,978 ft)

Population (2025-12-31)
  - Total: 5,855
  - Density: 168.2/km^{2} (435.6/sq mi)
- Time zone: UTC+01:00 (CET)
  - Summer (DST): UTC+02:00 (CEST)
- Postal codes: 82269
- Dialling codes: 08193
- Vehicle registration: LL
- Website: www.geltendorf.de

Geltendorf (German pronunciation: [ˈɡɛltn̩ˌdɔʁf]) is a municipality in the district of Landsberg in Bavaria, Germany.

== World heritage site ==
It is home to one or more prehistoric pile-dwelling (or stilt house) settlements that are part of the Prehistoric Pile dwellings around the Alps UNESCO World Heritage Site.

== Transport ==
The municipality has two railway stations, Geltendorf and Walleshausen.
