= Türkenfeld station =

Railway station in Bavaria, Germany

Türkenfeld

General information
- Location: Aresinger Straße/Bahnhofstraße; 82299 Türkenfeld; Bavaria; Germany
- Coordinates: 48°06′16″N 11°04′35″E
- System: Hp
- Owner: Deutsche Bahn
- Operator: DB Station&Service
- Lines: Munich–Buchloe railway (KBS 970)
- Platforms: 2 side platforms
- Tracks: 2
- Train operators: S-Bahn München
- Connections: 805, 807, 8200, 8400

Construction
- Parking: yes
- Cycle facilities: yes
- Accessible: partly

Other information
- Station code: 6286
- DS100 code: MTFD
- IBNR: 8005920
- Category: 5
- Fare zone: : 4
- Website: www.bahnhof.de

History
- Opened: 1 May 1873; 153 years ago

Services
Preceding station	Munich S-Bahn	Following station
Geltendorf Terminus	S4	Grafrath towards Ebersberg
Geltendorf Terminus	S20 Limited service	Grafrath towards Höllriegelskreuth
Location
- Location within Bavaria Location within Germany Location within Europe

Türkenfeld station (German: Haltepunkt Türkenfeld) is a railway station in the municipality of Türkenfeld, located in the Fürstenfeldbruck district in Bavaria, Germany.
