= Egling station =

Railway station in Bavaria

Egling
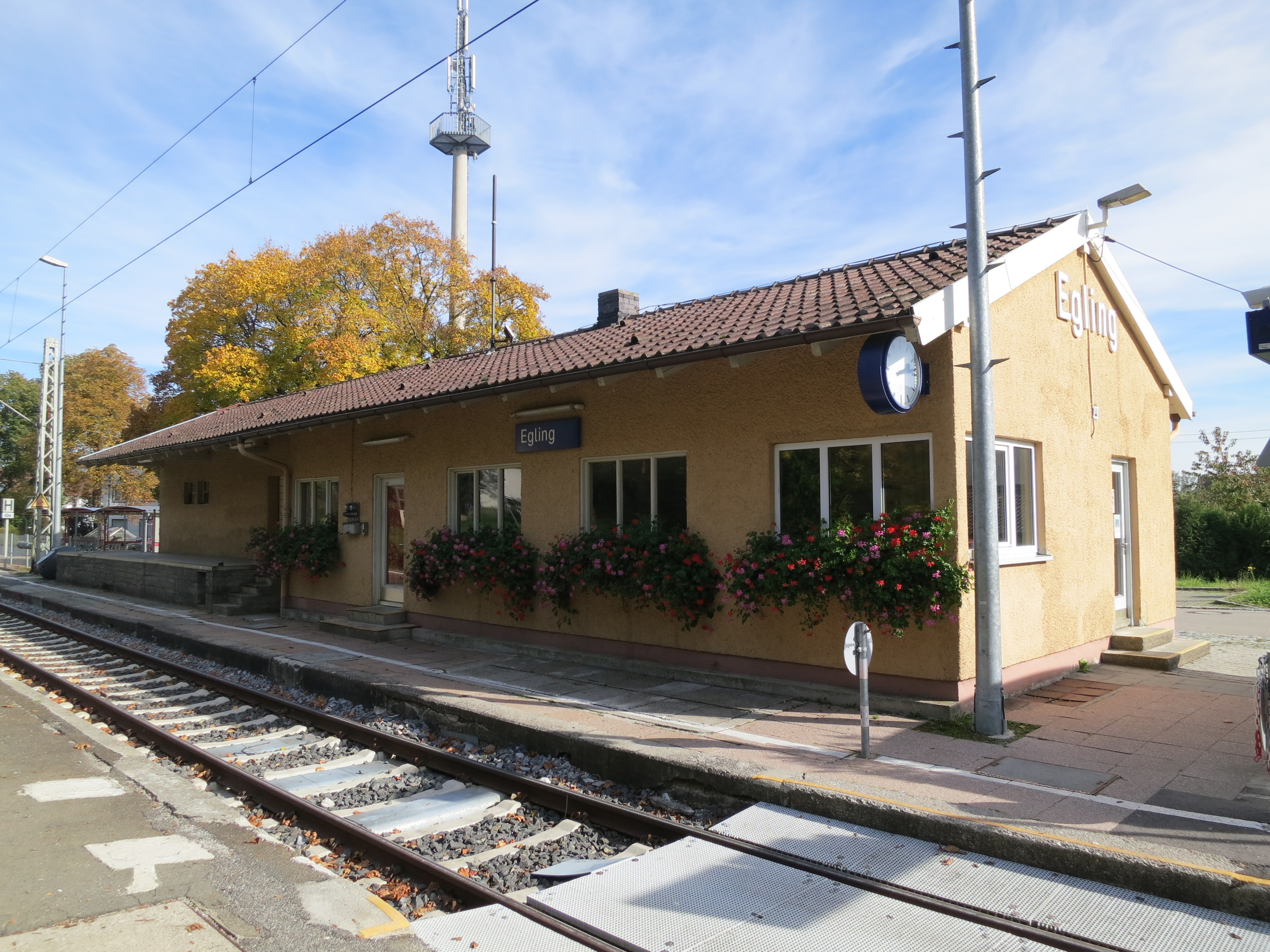
- The station in 2013

General information
- Location: Egling an der Paar, Bavaria; Germany
- Coordinates: 48°11′27″N 10°58′35″E
- Owner: DB Netz
- Operator: DB Station&Service
- Lines: Mering–Weilheim line (KBS 985)
- Distance: 8.9 km (5.5 mi) from Mering
- Platforms: 1 island platform; 1 side platform
- Tracks: 2
- Train operators: Bayerische Regiobahn
- Connections: Landsberger Verkehrsgemeinschaft buses

Other information
- Station code: 1482
- DS100 code: MELG
- IBNR: 8001683
- Category: 6

Services
Preceding station		Following station
Schmiechen (Schwab) towards Augsburg-Oberhausen	RB 67	Walleshausen towards Schongau
Location

Egling station (German: Bahnhof Egling) is a railway station in the municipality of Egling an der Paar, in Bavaria, Germany. It is located on the Mering–Weilheim line of Deutsche Bahn.

== Services ==
As of the December 2021 timetable change, the following services stop at Egling:

- RB: hourly service between Augsburg-Oberhausen and Weilheim (Oberbay); some trains continue from Weilheim to Schongau.
