= Egling an der Paar =

Egling a.d.Paar
- Municipality
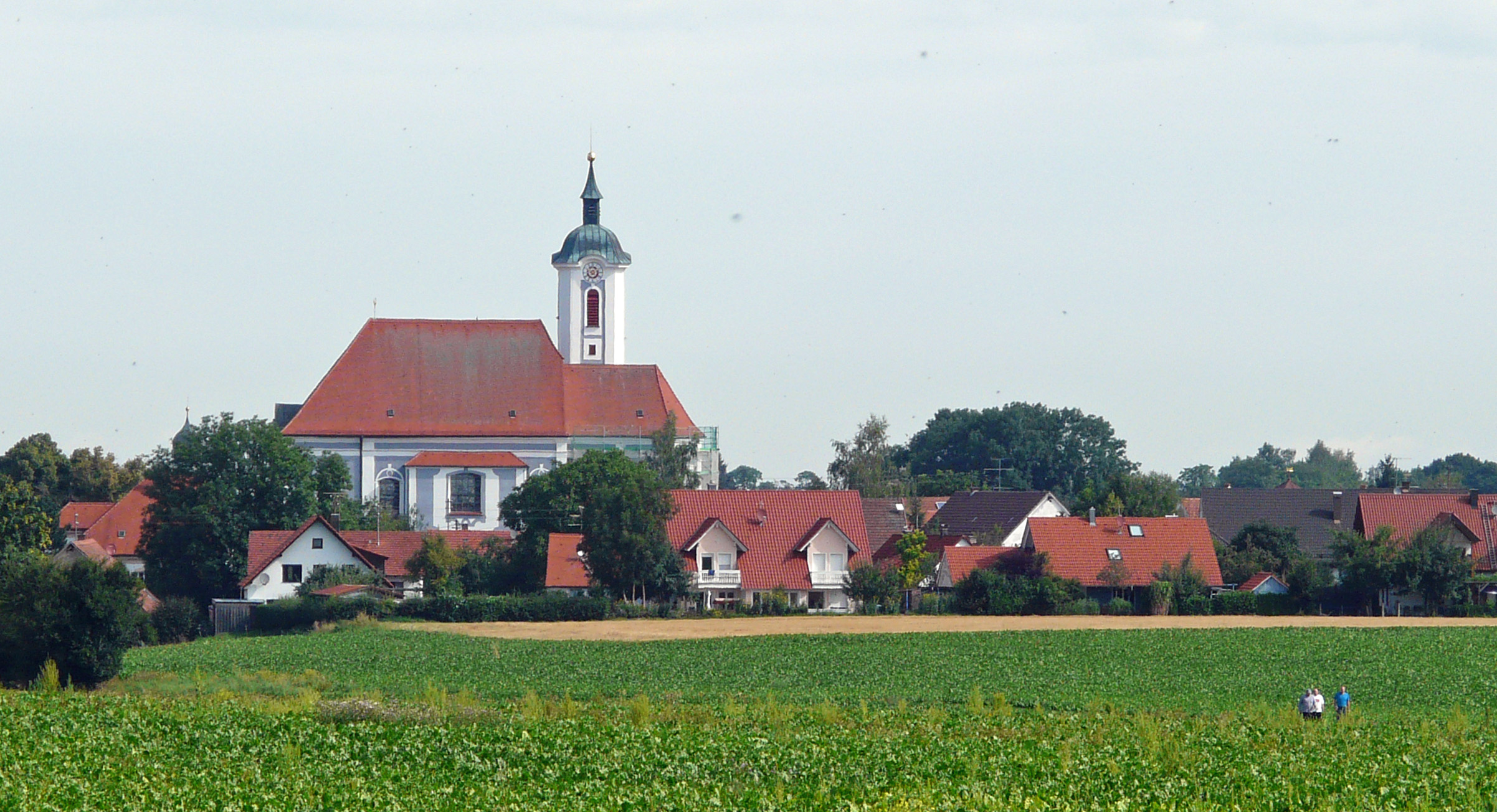
- Egling an der Paar seen from the south

- Coat of arms

- Location of Egling a.d.Paar within Landsberg am Lech district
- Interactive map of Egling a.d.Paar
- Location within Germany Location within Bavaria
- Coordinates: 48°10′N 10°58′E
- Country: Germany
- State: Bavaria
- Admin. region: Oberbayern
- District: Landsberg am Lech
- Subdivisions: 2 Ortsteile

Government
  - Mayor (2020–26): Ferdinand Holzer (CSU)

Area
  - Total: 20.77 km^{2} (8.02 sq mi)
- Elevation: 552 m (1,811 ft)

Population (2025-12-31)
  - Total: 2,448
  - Density: 117.9/km^{2} (305.3/sq mi)
- Time zone: UTC+01:00 (CET)
  - Summer (DST): UTC+02:00 (CEST)
- Postal codes: 86492
- Dialling codes: 08206
- Vehicle registration: LL
- Website: www.egling.com

Egling an der Paar is a municipality in the district of Landsberg in Bavaria in Germany.

== Transport ==
The municipality has a railway station, Egling, on the Mering–Weilheim line.
