= Geltendorf station =

Railway station in Bavaria, Germany

Geltendorf
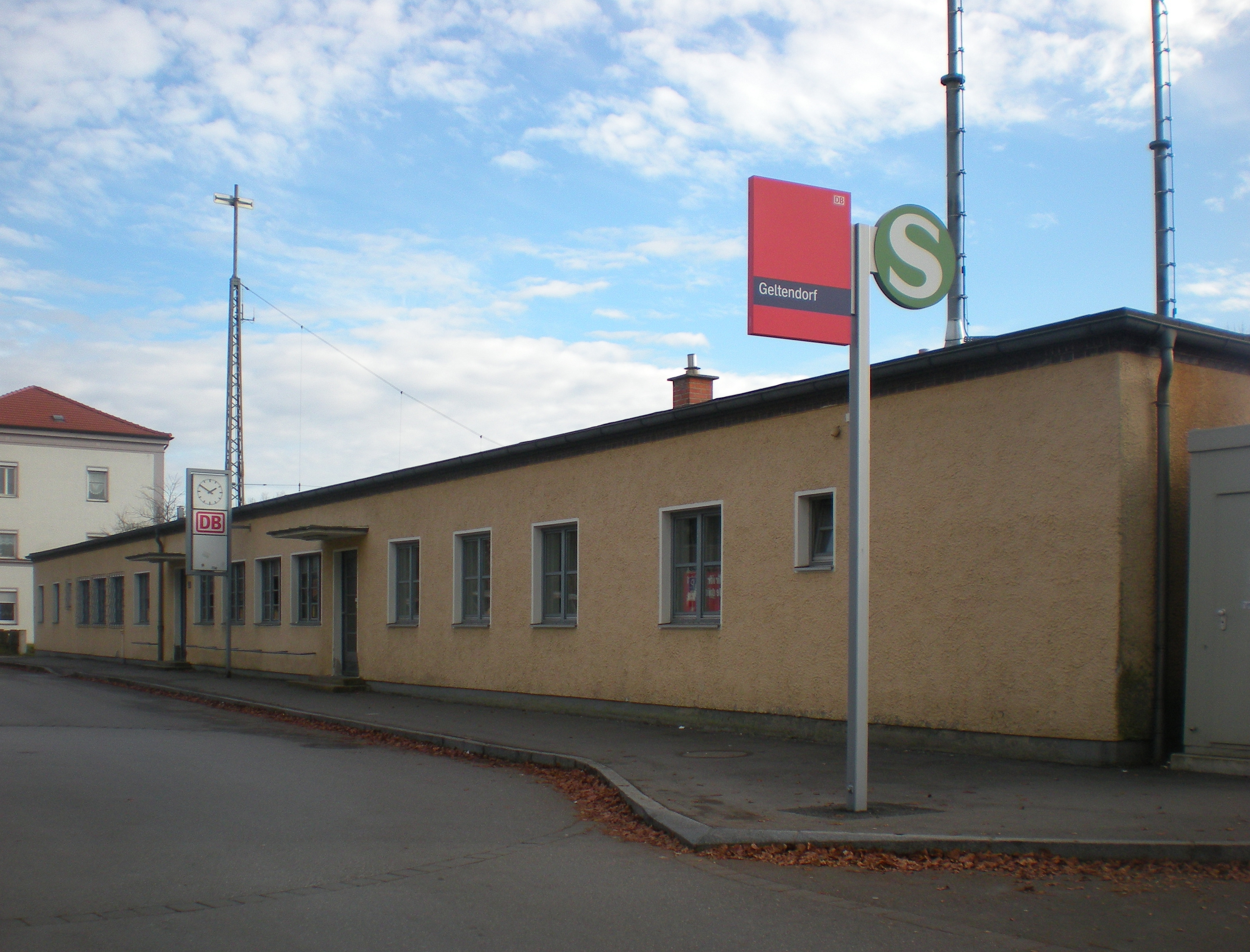
- Street side of the station building

General information
- Location: Geltendorf, Bavaria; Germany
- Coordinates: 48°06′21″N 11°02′15″E
- Owner: Deutsche Bahn
- Operator: DB Netz; DB Station&Service
- Lines: Munich–Buchloe railway (KBS 970 / 999.4); Augsburg–Weilheim (KBS 985)
- Platforms: 5
- Connections: 809, 810, 816, 817, 894V, 8162

Construction
- Accessible: Yes

Other information
- Station code: 2058
- DS100 code: MGE
- IBNR: 8000119
- Category: 3
- Fare zone: : 4 and 5
- Website: www.bahnhof.de; stationsdatenbank.de

History
- Opened: 30 June 1898

Passengers
- 6,000

Services
Preceding station	DB Regio Bayern	Following station
Kaufering towards Lindau-Insel	RE 70	Munich-Pasing towards München Hbf
Kaufering towards Oberstdorf	RE 76	Munich-Pasing towards München Hbf
Kaufering towards Buchloe	RB 74	Fürstenfeldbruck towards München Hbf
Preceding station		Following station
Kaufering towards Memmingen	RE 72	Munich-Pasing towards München Hbf
Kaufering towards Lindau-Reutin	RE 96 Limited service	Munich-Pasing towards München Hbf
Preceding station		Following station
Walleshausen towards Augsburg-Oberhausen	RB 67	St. Ottilien towards Schongau
Kaufering towards Füssen	RB 68	Munich-Pasing towards München Hbf
Preceding station	Munich S-Bahn	Following station
Terminus	S4	Türkenfeld towards Ebersberg
Terminus	S20 Limited service	Türkenfeld towards Höllriegelskreuth
Location

Geltendorf station is the largest railway station of the town of Geltendorf and is a railway junction in Upper Bavaria, Germany. The railway junction is also a station of the Munich S-Bahn. It has five platforms and is classified by Deutsche Bahn as a category 3 station. The station is served by about 150 trains daily of Deutsche Bahn, Bayerische Regiobahn (a subsidiary of Transdev, BRB) and Regentalbahn, including 50 services of the Munich S-Bahn. The Munich–Buchloe railway and the Mering–Weilheim railway cross at the station.

Geltendorf municipality also includes Walleshausen station and the disused stations of Kaltenberg and Wabern, all located on the Ammersee Railway.

== Location ==
Geltendorf station lies south of the town centre in the south of the district of Geltendorf Bahnhof (Geltendorf station). The station building is located just north of the tracks and has the address of Am Bahnhof 6. The station is about a kilometre away from the town centre of Geltendorf.

== History ==
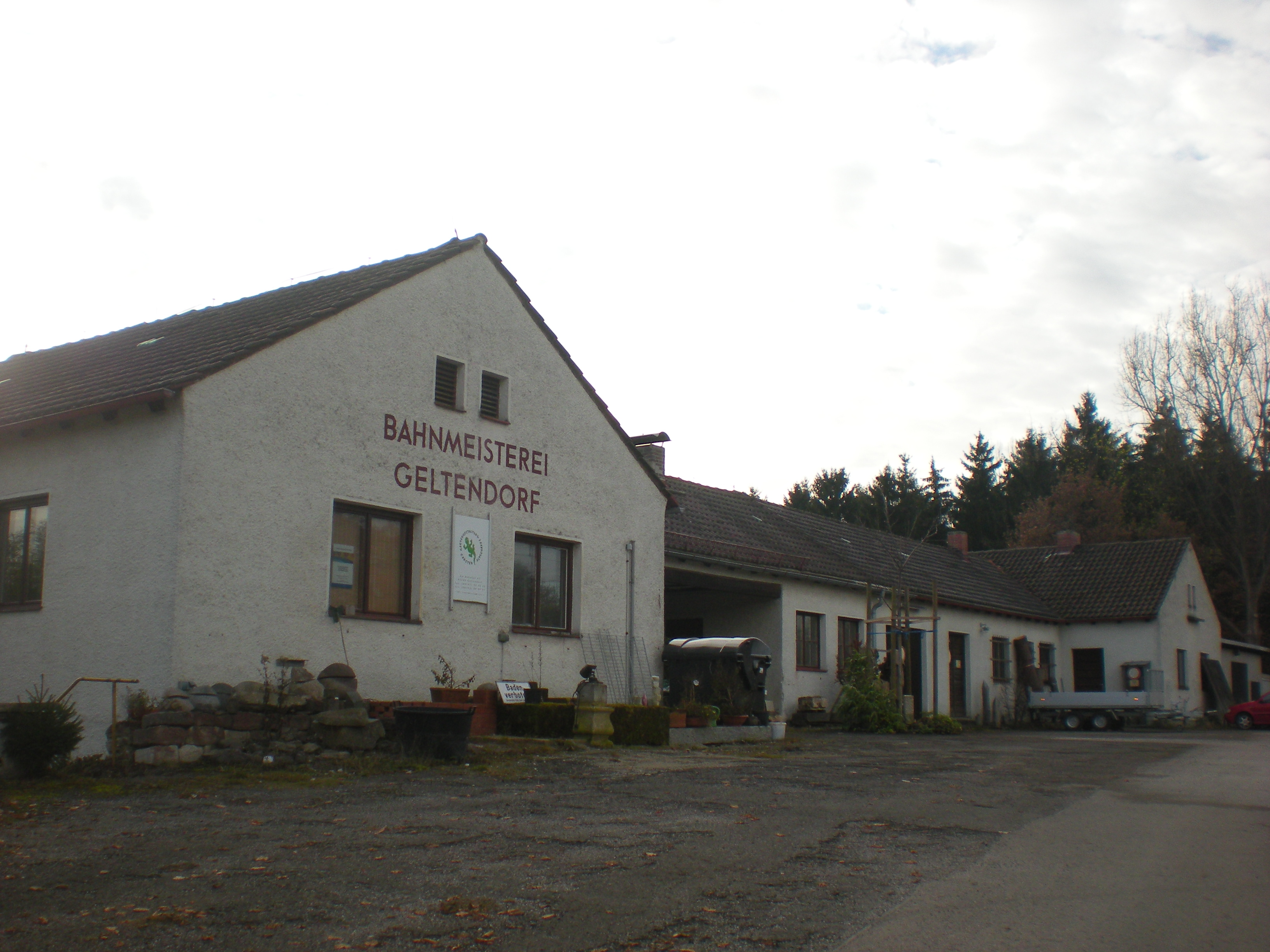
Bahnmeisterei (track supervisor's office)

On 1 May 1873, the last section of the Allgäu Railway from Munich to Kaufering was opened, completing the line from Munich to Lindau. This route went through the municipality of Geltendorf, but no station was built in Geltendorf. The station was only built with the opening of Ammersee Railway from Augsburg to Schondorf on 30 June 1898 (and completed to Weilheim on the 24 December 1898) at the junction of two lines near Geltendorf. This was done particularly on the insistence of the monastery of St. Ottilien, which needed it for the carriage of building materials. Two signal boxes were built at the western and the eastern ends of the station. In 1907, the Allgäu Railway was duplicated and, as a result, Geltendorf station was expanded to five tracks and received an underpass to the central platforms. A grade-separated crossing was also built between the Ammersee and Allgäu railways and the route of the Ammersee Railway was changed. During the First World War, a prison camp (Puchheim central prison) was established in 1915 to the east of the station with its prisoners working on the railways. It was closed in 1921. Between 1937 and 1938, track supervisor's office (Bahnmeisterei) No 2 was built at the eastern end of the station. In World War II, a bunker was built at the station for the railway employees. However, the station was not destroyed because of its low strategic importance. Between 18 June 1944 and the 27 April 1945, concentration camp prisoners were transported on both lines through Geltendorf station. Moreover, the original route of the Ammersee Railway was reactivated during World War II. This was used as a hiding place for ammunition shipments and was dismantled in 1947. From 1951 to 1952, the track supervisor's office was expanded by building a second building.

=== S-Bahn operations ===
The station was transformed radically for S-Bahn operations from 1968: the platforms were upgraded and raised until 29 September 1968 and electrification of the Allgäu line between Munich and Geltendorf was put into operation. A track plan push button interlocking was installed at the station on 30 July 1968. In 1979, the operations office in Geltendorf was disbanded and supervision of the station was assigned to Kaufering and later Buchloe. On 7 September 1970, the Ammersee Railway was electrified between Augsburg and Geltendorf as a diversion route for the densely used Munich–Augsburg railway. In the same year the signal boxes were demolished. As a result, the travel time between Munich and Geltendorf fell from 78 to 40 minutes. Finally, on 28 May 1972, the Munich S-Bahn was commissioned and Geltendorf became the terminus of S-Bahn line S 4. With the introduction of the S-Bahn, the former ticket gates were removed and passengers could now enter the entire station area without supervision. In 1974, the class 628 electrical multiple unit was officially inaugurated at Geltendorf station. The track supervisor's office was closed in 1996. The subway was extended to the south in 2004 and the platform next to the station building was renovated in August 2005. The station was rebuilt without barriers for the disabled in 2006. A new parking lot was opened south of the tracks on 5 December 2006. The station was served by line S 8 from December 2005, but the line S 4 service returned in December 2009.

=== Station building ===
Geltendorf station had two service buildings at its opening. One was located to the south of the railway tracks and served as a watering point. It had two water tanks on the top floor and basement premises for the employees of the track supervisor. To the north of the tracks there was a makeshift wooden building that served the administration and the train dispatcher. This was replaced in 1930 by a plain brick building that serves the station to this day as an entrance building. The watering point was later demolished. In the same place there was a wooden shed from 1960 to 1970.

== Infrastructure ==
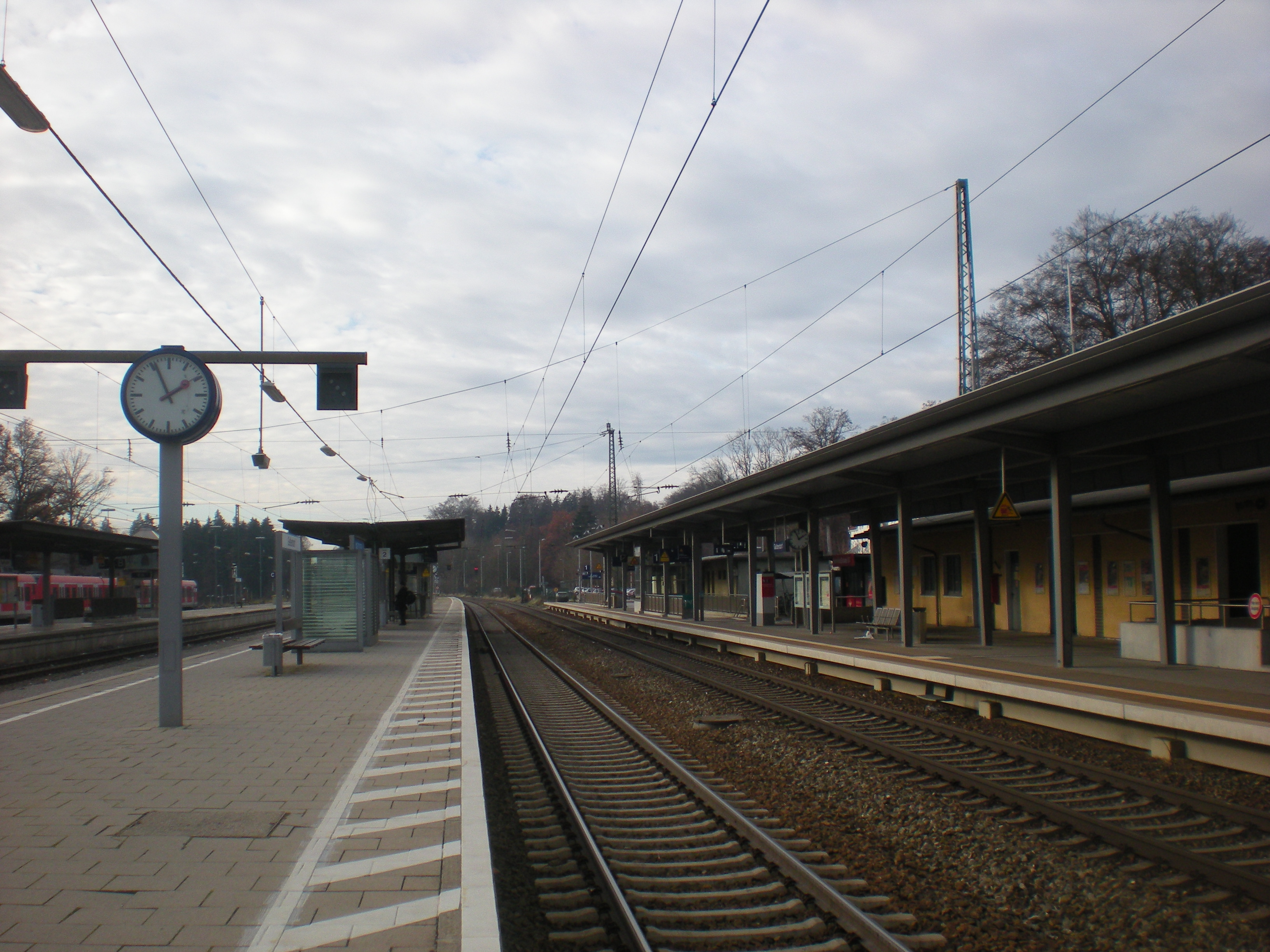
Platforms

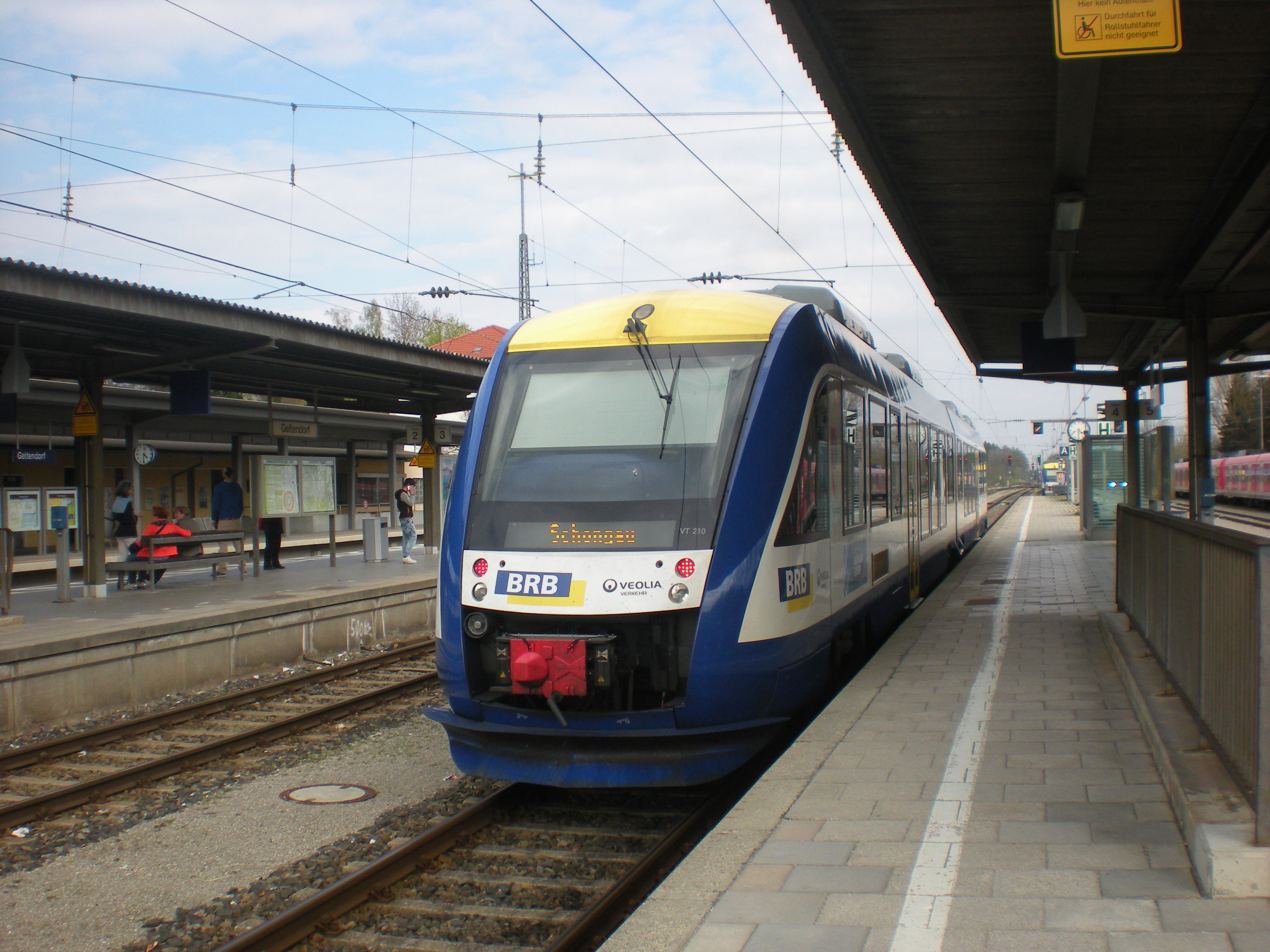
BRB to Schongau

The station has five tracks on three platforms. Platform 1 (the main platform) is next to the station building and is used by regional services towards Buchloe. Platform 2 is used by regional and some S-Bahn services to Munich; the remaining S-Bahn services to Munich stop on platform track 3. Bavarian regional services towards Weilheim stop on track 4 and services towards Augsburg stop on track 5. In addition, there are three sidings south of the platforms. All platforms are covered and are equipped with lifts to make them accessible for the disabled. The two central platforms are connected by an underpass to the main platform. There is a platform display only on the main platform.

The station is located in the area of the Münchner Verkehrs- und Tarifverbund (Munich Transport and Tariff Association, MVV).

=== Platform data ===
Platform lengths and heights are as follows:

- Track 1: length 262 m, height 55 cm
- Track 2: length 259 m, height 76 cm
- Track 3: length 259 m, height 76 cm
- Track 4: length 259 m, height 76 cm
- Track 5: length 259 m, height 76 cm

== Operations ==
The station is not served by scheduled long-distance services.

Regional-Express services run on the Munich–Memmingen, Munich–Füssen and Munich–Kempten routes every two hours and a Bayerische Regiobahn service runs on the Augsburg–Schongau route hourly.

Geltendorf is also the terminus of the Munich S-Bahn line S4, which runs every 20 or 40 minutes alternatively

Line/ train type	Route	Frequency
RE 70/ RE 76	Munich – Geltendorf – Kaufering – Buchloe – Kaufbeuren – Kempten – Immenstadt – Oberstdorf / – Hergatz – Lindau-Reutin	Every 2 hours
RE 72	Munich – Geltendorf – Kaufering – Buchloe – Türkheim – Memmingen	Every 2 hours
RB 74	Munich – Geltendorf – Kaufering – Buchloe – Kaufbeuren – Biessenhofen – Kempten	Hourly
RB 67	Augsburg-Oberhausen – Augsburg – Geltendorf – Weilheim (Oberbay) (– Schongau)	Hourly
RB 68	Munich – Geltendorf – Kaufering – Buchloe – Kaufbeuren – Biessenhofen – Füssen	Some trains
