= Augsburg =

City in Bavaria, Germany

Augsburg Ougschburg (Swabian)
- City
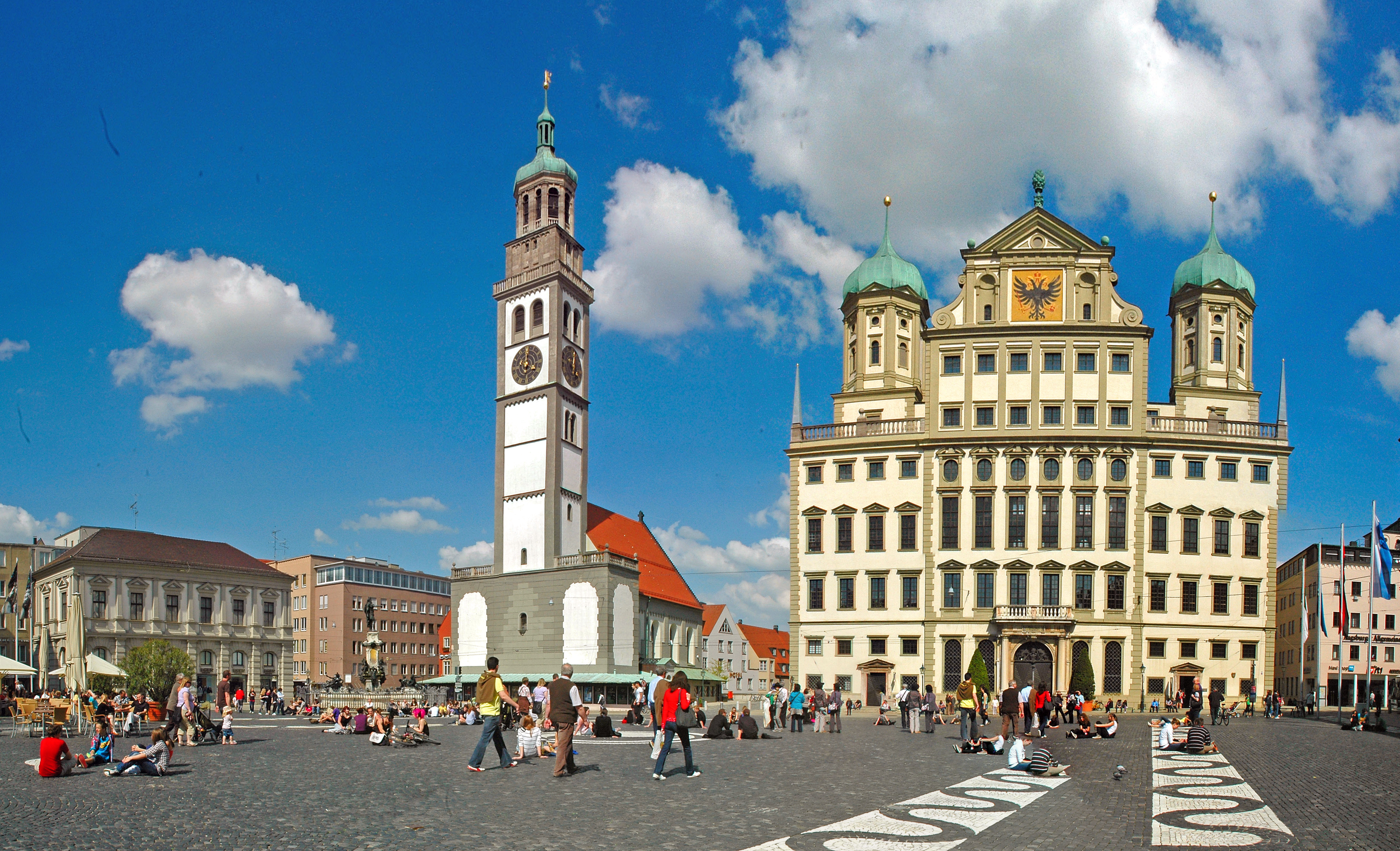
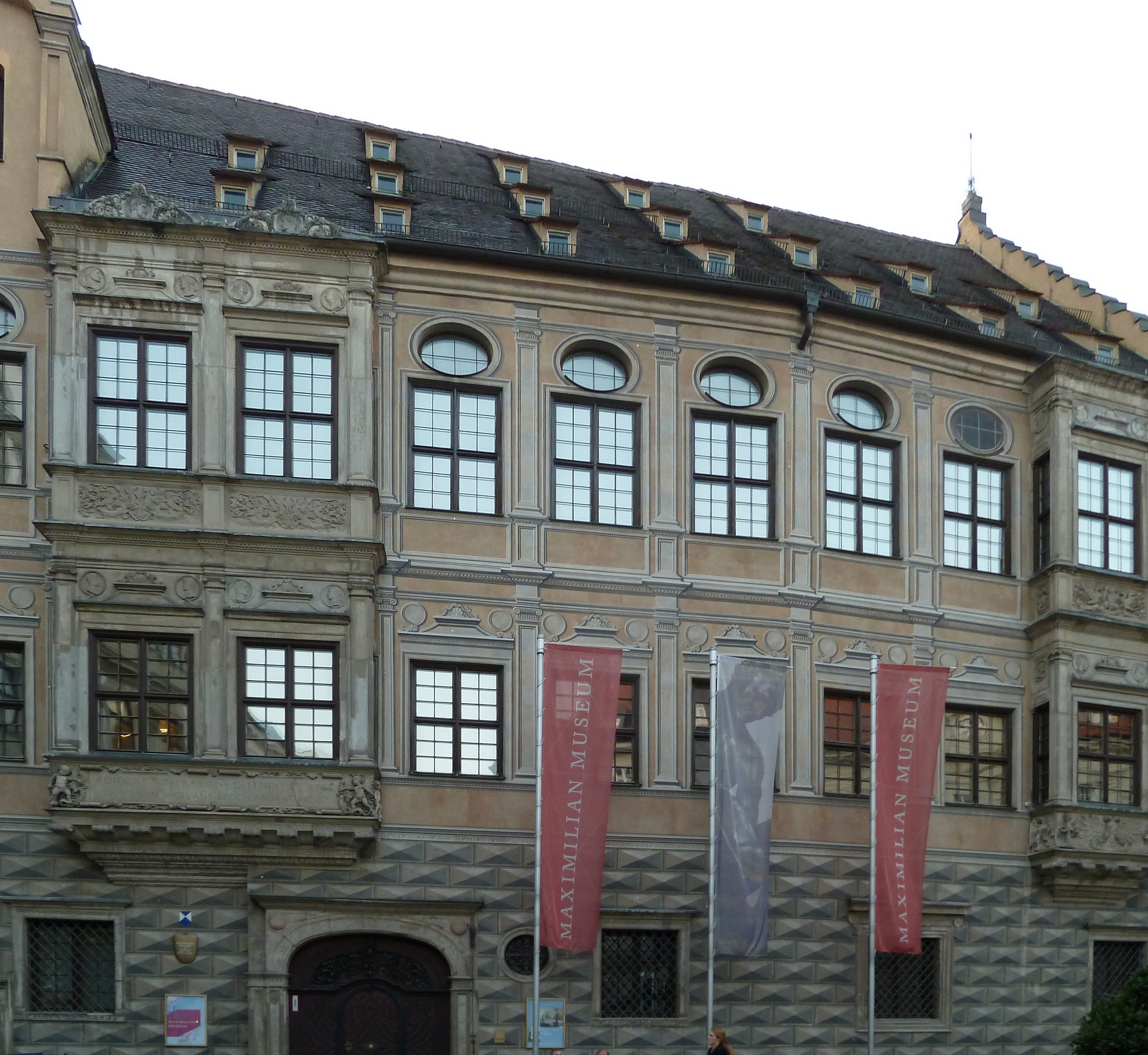
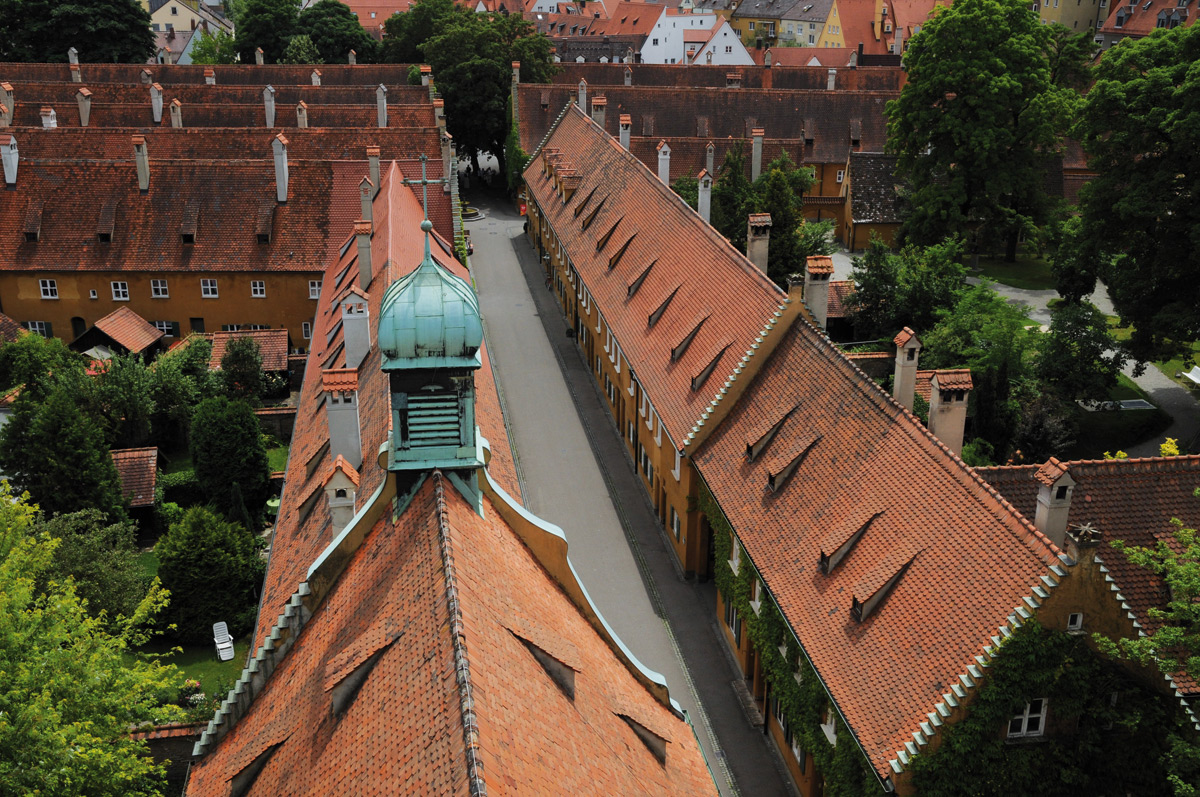
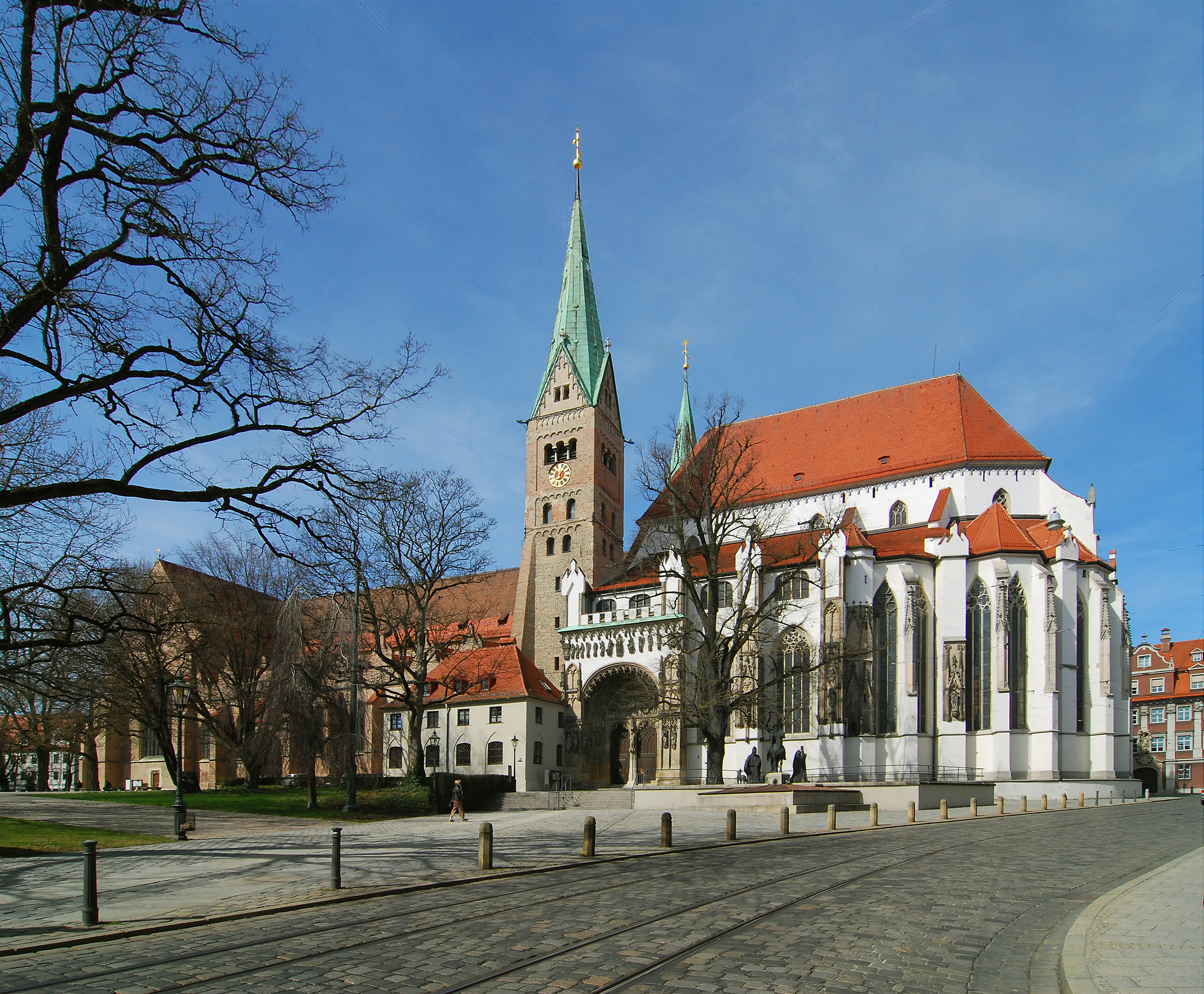
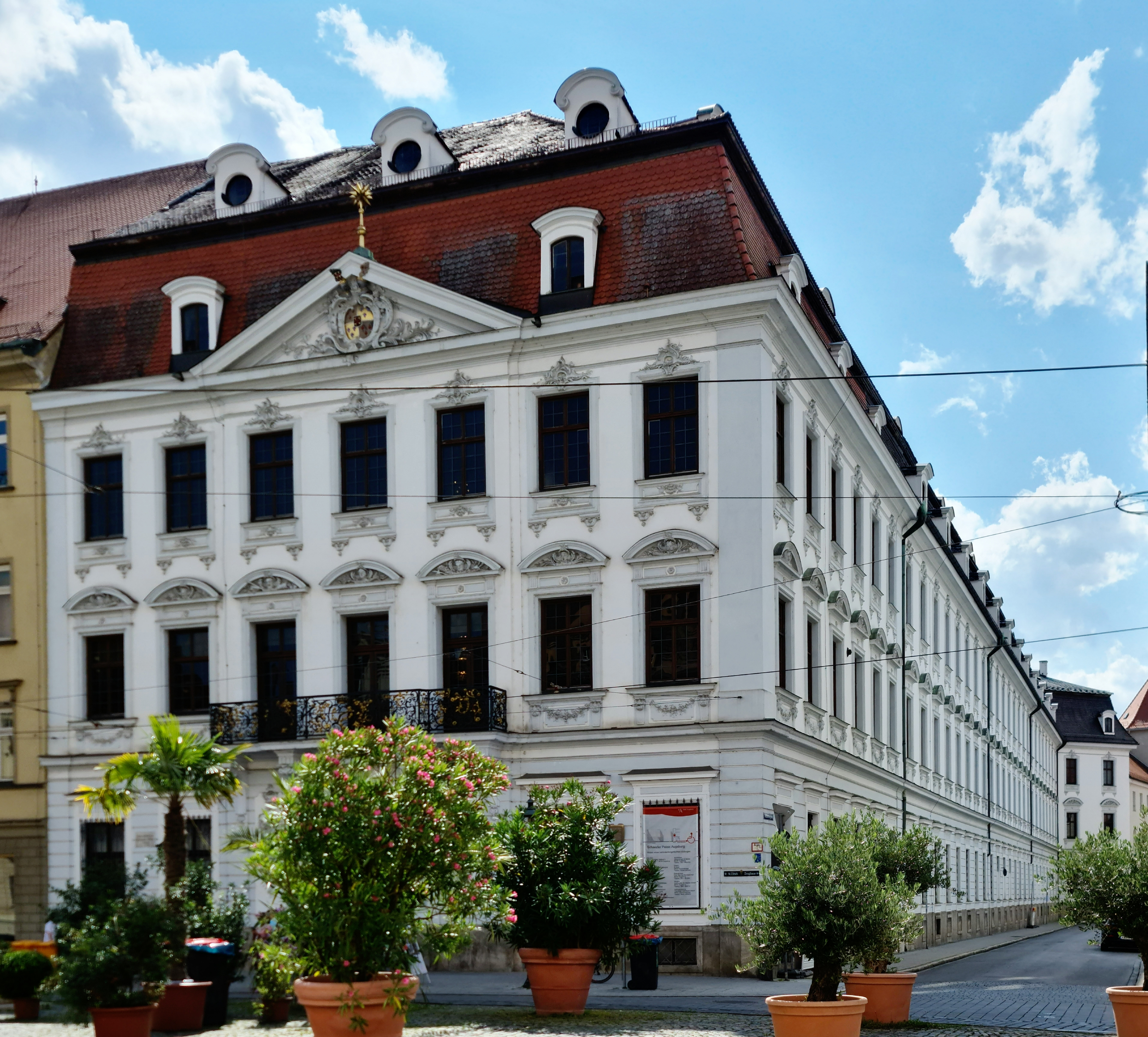
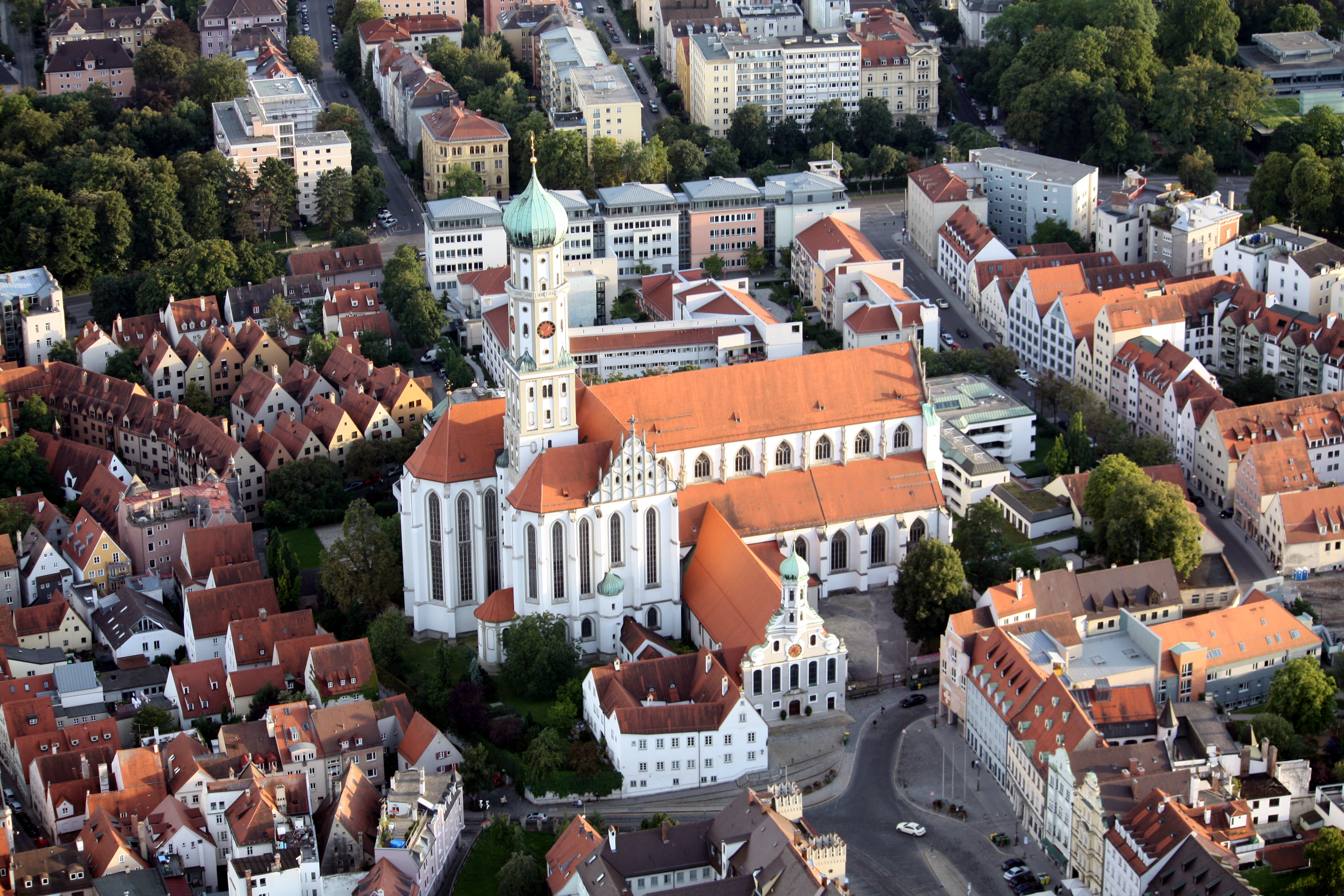
- Perlachturm and Augsburg Town Hall Maximilian Museum Fuggerei Augsburg Cathedral Schaezlerpalais Basilica of SS. Ulrich and Afra

- Flag Coat of arms
- Interactive map of Augsburg
- Location within Germany Location within Bavaria
- Coordinates: 48°22′08″N 10°53′52″E
- Country: Germany
- State: Bavaria
- Admin. region: Swabia
- District: Urban district
- First mentioned: 15 BC

Government
  - Mayor (2026–): Florian Freund (SPD)

Area
  - City: 146.84 km^{2} (56.70 sq mi)
- Elevation: 494 m (1,621 ft)

Population (2025-12-31)
  - City: 301,786
  - Density: 2,055.2/km^{2} (5,323.0/sq mi)
  - Metro: 885,000
- Time zone: UTC+01:00 (CET)
  - Summer (DST): UTC+02:00 (CEST)
- Postal codes: 86150–86199
- Dialling codes: 0821
- Vehicle registration: A
- Website: www.augsburg.de

Augsburg (UK: /ˈaʊɡzbɜːrɡ/ OWGZ-burg, also US: /ˈɔːɡz-/ AWGZ-; German: [ˈaʊksbʊʁk]; Swabian German: Ougschburg) is a city in the Bavarian part of Swabia, Germany, around 50 kilometres (31 mi) west of the Bavarian capital Munich. It is a university town and the regional seat of the Regierungsbezirk Swabia with a well-preserved Altstadt (historical city centre). Augsburg is an urban district and home to the institutions of the Landkreis Augsburg. It is the third-largest city in Bavaria (after Munich and Nuremberg), with a population of 304,000 and 885,000 in its metropolitan area.

After Neuss, Trier, Worms, Cologne and Xanten, Augsburg is one of Germany's oldest cities, founded in 15 BC by the Romans as Augusta Vindelicorum and named after the Roman emperor Augustus. It was a Free Imperial City from 1276 to 1803 and the home of the patrician Fugger and Welser families that dominated European banking in the 16th century. According to Behringer, in the sixteenth century it became "the dominant centre of early capitalism", having benefited from being part of the Kaiserliche Reichspost system as "the location of the most important post office within the Holy Roman Empire" and the city's close connection to Maximilian I. The city played a leading role in the Reformation as the site of the 1530 Augsburg Confession and the 1555 Peace of Augsburg. The Fuggerei, the oldest social housing complex in the world, was founded in 1513 by Jakob Fugger.

In 2019, UNESCO recognised the Water Management System of Augsburg as a World Heritage Site because of its unique medieval canals and water towers and its testimony to the development of hydraulic engineering.

== Geography ==
Augsburg lies at the convergence of the Alpine rivers Lech and Wertach and on the Singold. The oldest part of the city and the southern quarters are on the northern foothills of a high terrace, which has emerged between the steep rim of the hills of Friedberg in the east and the high hills of the west. In the south extends the Lechfeld, an outwash plain of the post ice age between the rivers Lech and Wertach, where rare primeval landscapes were preserved. The Augsburg city forest and the Lech valley heaths today rank among the most species-rich middle European habitats.

Augsburg borders the nature park Augsburg Western Woods, a large forestland. The city itself is also heavily verdant. As a result, in 1997, Augsburg was the first German city to win the Europe-wide contest Entente Florale for Europe's greenest and most livable city.

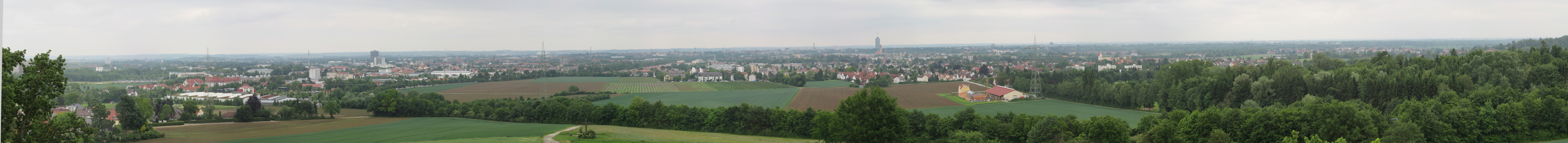
View of Augsburg, from the west

=== Suburbs and neighbouring municipalities ===
Augsburg is surrounded by the counties Landkreis Augsburg in the west and Aichach-Friedberg in the east.

The suburbs of Augsburg are Friedberg, Königsbrunn, Stadtbergen, Neusäß, Gersthofen, Diedorf.

Neighbouring municipalities: Rehling, Affing, Kissing, Mering, Merching, Bobingen, Gessertshausen.

== History ==
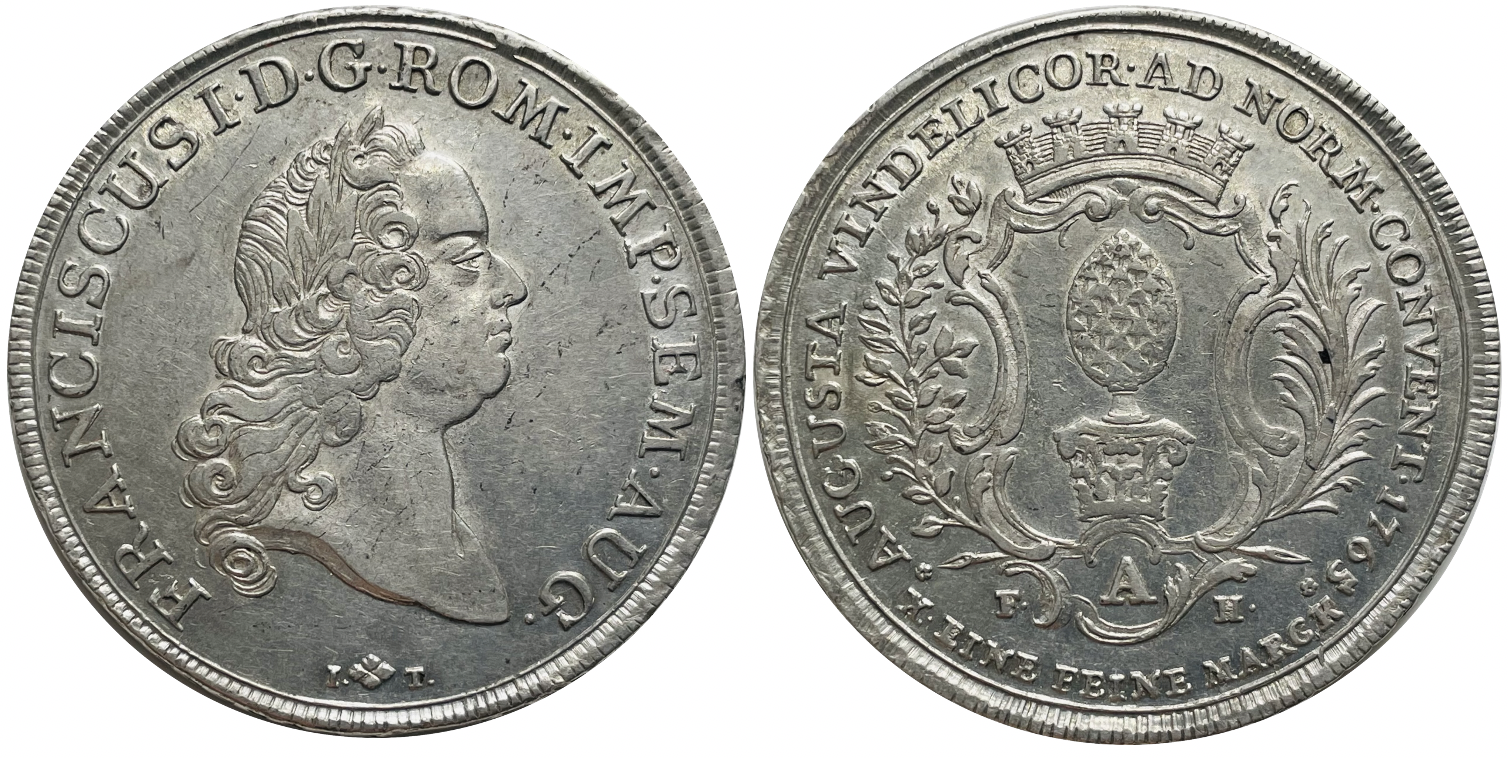
Silver coin: 1 conventionsthaler Francis I, Holy Roman Emperor, 1765

=== Early history ===
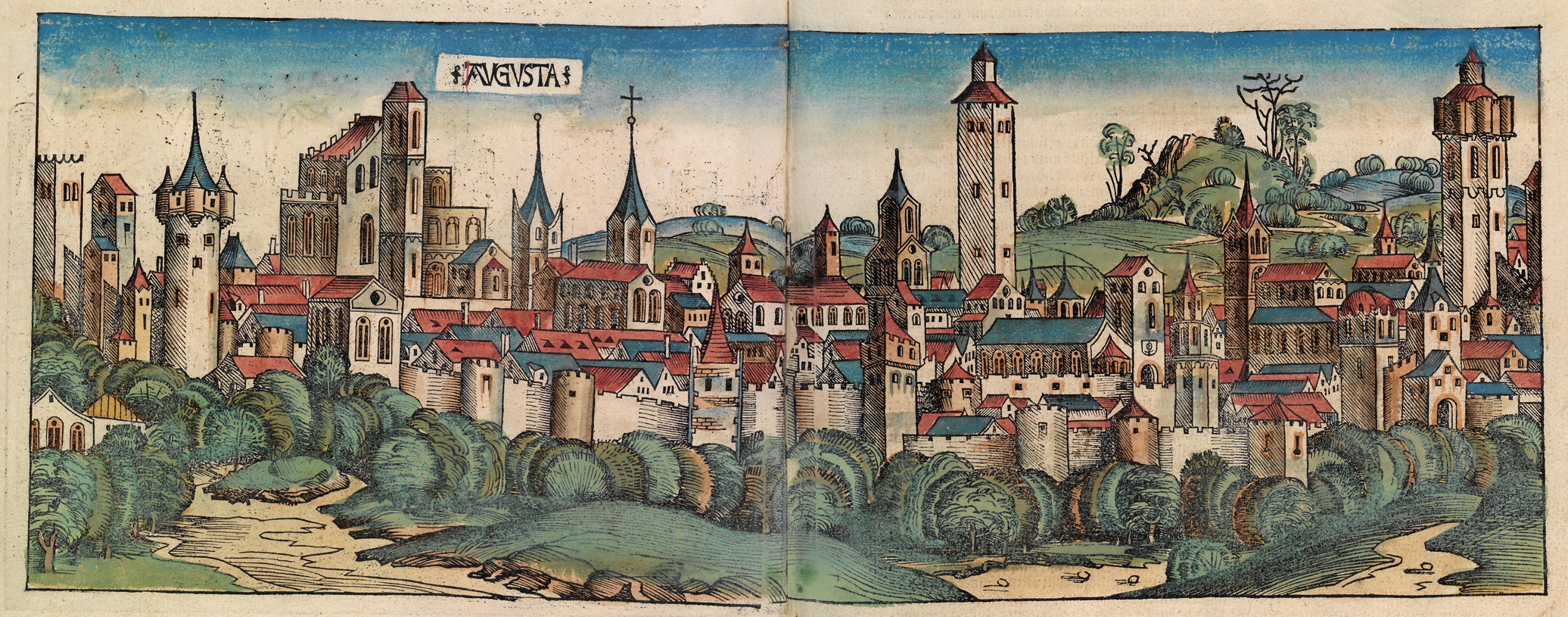
Panorama of Augsburg, 1493

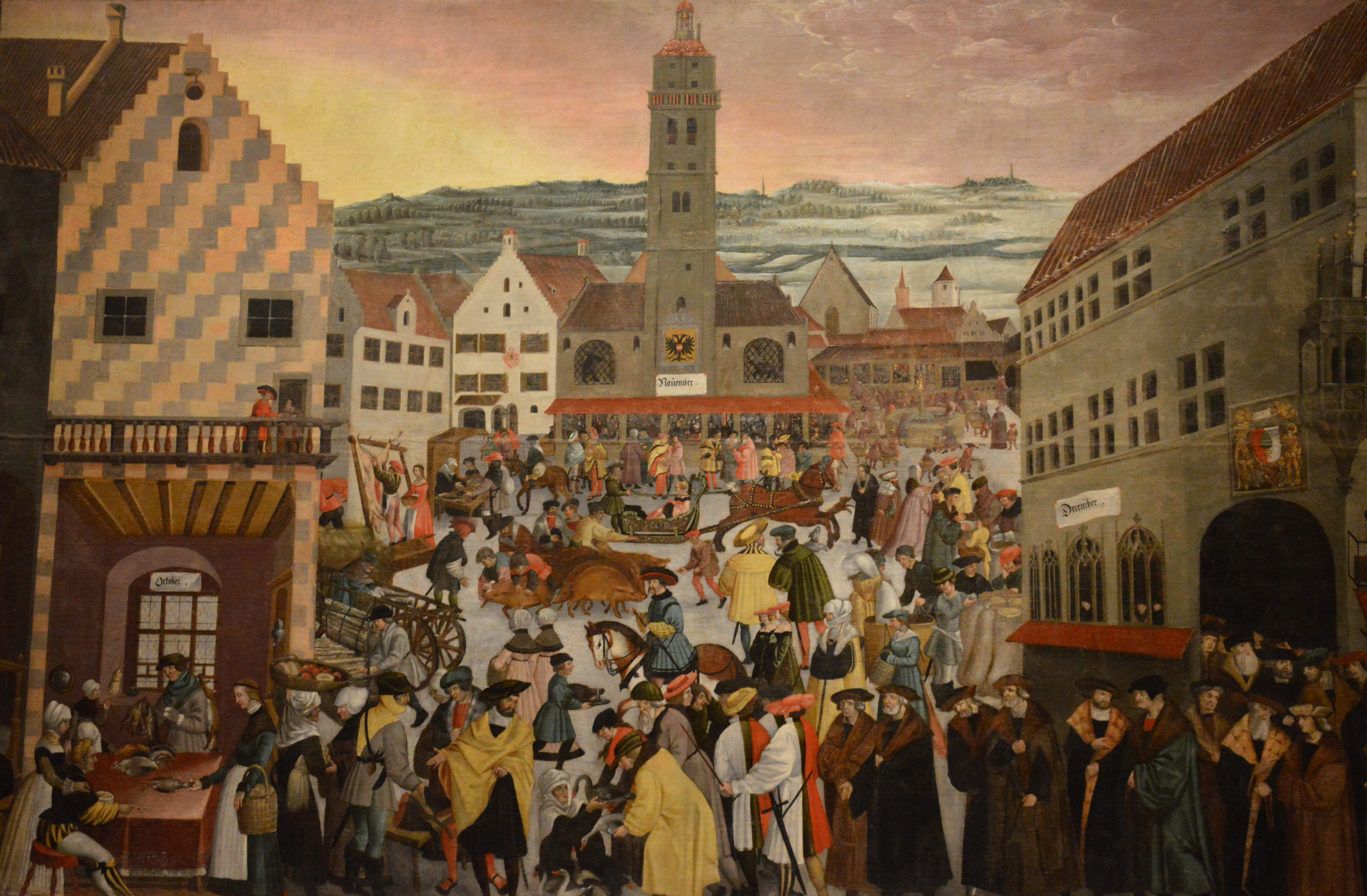
Perlach market place in 1550

The city of Augsburg was founded in 15 BC on the orders of Emperor Augustus. Emperor Augustus conducted extensive military campaigns and established administrative settlements. The Roman colony that became Augsburg was known as Augusta Vindelicorum, meaning "the Augustan city of the Vindelici". The settlement was established at the convergence of the Alpine rivers Lech and Wertach. In 120 AD Augsburg became the administrative capital of the Roman province of Raetia. Augsburg was sacked by the Huns in the fifth century AD, by Charlemagne in the eighth century and by Welf I, Duke of Bavaria in the 11th century.

=== Augsburg Confession ===
Augsburg was granted the status of a Free Imperial City on 9 March 1276, and from then until 1803, it was independent of its former overlord, the Prince-Bishop of Augsburg. Frictions between the city-state and the prince-bishops were to remain frequent, however, particularly after Augsburg became Protestant and curtailed the rights and freedoms of Catholics. With its strategic location at an intersection of trade routes to Italy, the Free Imperial City of Augsburg became a major trading centre.

Augsburg produced large quantities of woven goods, cloth, and textiles. Augsburg became the base of two banking families that rose to great prominence, the Fuggers and the Welsers. The Fugger family donated the Fuggerei part of the city devoted to housing for needy citizens in 1516, which remains in use today.

In 1530, the Augsburg Confession was presented to the Holy Roman Emperor at the Diet of Augsburg. Following the Peace of Augsburg in 1555, after which the rights of religious minorities in imperial cities were to be legally protected, a mixed Catholic–Protestant city council presided over a majority Protestant population; see Paritätische Reichsstadt.

=== Leading European centre of capitalism of the sixteenth century ===
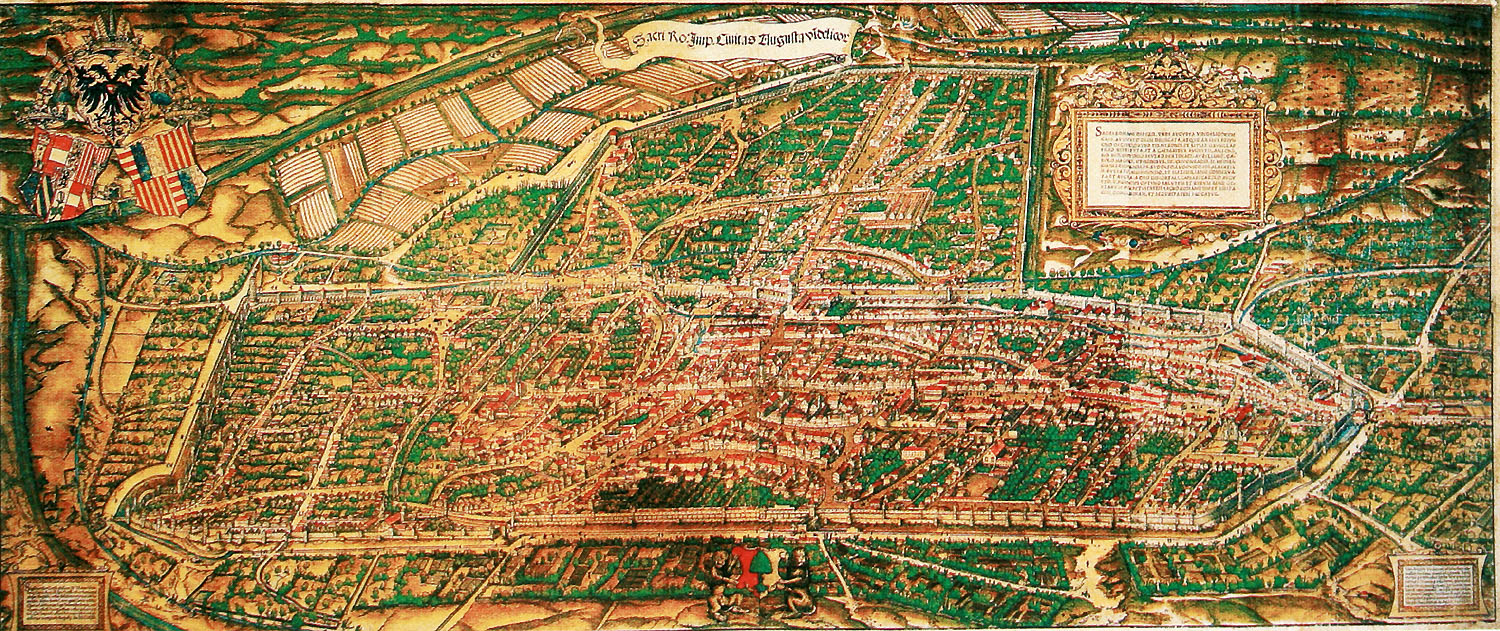
A "bird's-eye view" plan of western Augsburg, 1521

Augsburg's economic boom years occurred during the 15th and 16th centuries thanks to the bank and metal businesses of the merchant families Fugger, Welser, and Hochstetter. These families held a near-total monopoly in important industries. Monopolies were considered criminal in contemporary laws, and these families' practices were criticised by Martin Luther himself, but as Emperor Charles V needed their financial assistance, he cancelled the charge in the 1530s. In the 16th century Augsburg became one of Germany's largest cities. Augsburg was a major manufacturing centre for textiles, armor, scientific instruments, as well as gold- and silver-smithing. The prolific printers of Augsburg also made the city the largest producer of German-language books in the Holy Roman Empire. Like other free imperial cities, Augsburg was an independent entity and had authority over its tax policies.

Augsburg's wealth attracted artists seeking patrons. The city rapidly became a creative centre for sculptors and musicians. Augsburg became the base of the Holbein family, starting with Hans Holbein the Elder. The composer Leopold Mozart was born and educated in Augsburg. Rococo became so prevalent that it became known as "the Augsburg taste" throughout Europe.

Augsburg benefited greatly from the establishment and expansion of the Kaiserliche Reichspost in the late 15th and early 16th century. This postal system, which was the first modern postal service in the world, was created through negotiations and agreements between the Taxis family represented by Franz von Taxis and the early Habsburgs monarches, notably Maximilian I, his son Philip the Handsome and grandson Charles V. Even when the Habsburg empire began to extend to other parts of Europe, Maximilian's loyalty to Augsburg, where he conducted a lot of his endeavours, meant that the imperial city became "the dominant centre of early capitalism" of the sixteenth century, and "the location of the most important post office within the Holy Roman Empire". From Maximilian's time, as the "terminuses of the first transcontinental post lines" began to shift from Innsbruck to Venice and from Brussels to Antwerp, in these cities, the communication system and the news market started to converge. As the Fuggers as well as other trading companies based their most important branches in these cities, these traders gained access to these systems as well (despite a widely circulated theory which holds that the Fuggers themselves operated their own communication system, in reality they relied upon the imperial posts, presumably from the 1490s onwards, as official members of the court of Maximilian I).

=== Witch hunts ===
Several witch hunts occurred in Augsburg in the late 16th century. Following the 1585–1588 plague epidemic, southeast Germany was shattered by the 1589–1591 witch hunts. Following the 1592–1593 plague epidemic, cities in southeast Germany entered a period of inflation, marked by brutal witch hunts in urban areas.

=== Thirty Years' War ===
Religious peace in the city was largely maintained despite increasing tensions up to the Thirty Years' War (1618–1648). In 1629, the Holy Roman Emperor Ferdinand II issued the Edict of Restitution, which restored the legal situation of 1552. However, the edict was revoked in April 1632, when Gustavus Adolphus of Sweden occupied Augsburg.

In 1634, the Swedish army was defeated at the nearby Battle of Nördlingen. By October 1634, Catholic troops had surrounded Augsburg. The Swedish army refused to surrender, and a siege ensued through the winter of 1634/35, and thousands died from hunger and disease. During the Swedish occupation and the siege by Catholic troops, the population of the city was reduced from about 70,000 to about 16,000. Diseases such as typhus and the plague ravaged the city.

=== Guilds ===
In the first half of the 17th century, Augsburg was pivotal in the European network of goldsmiths. Augsburg attracted goldsmith journeymen from all over Europe, and in the 18th century, a large number of silversmiths and goldsmiths became master craftsman in Augsburg.

=== Nine Years' War ===
In 1686, the Holy Roman Emperor Leopold I formed the League of Augsburg, also known as the "Grand Alliance" after England joined in 1689. The coalition consisted at various times of Austria, Bavaria, Brandenburg, England, the Holy Roman Empire, the Electorate of the Palatinate, Portugal, Savoy, Saxony, Spain, Sweden, and the Dutch Republic. The coalition was formed to defend the Electorate of the Palatinate and fought against France in the Nine Years' War.

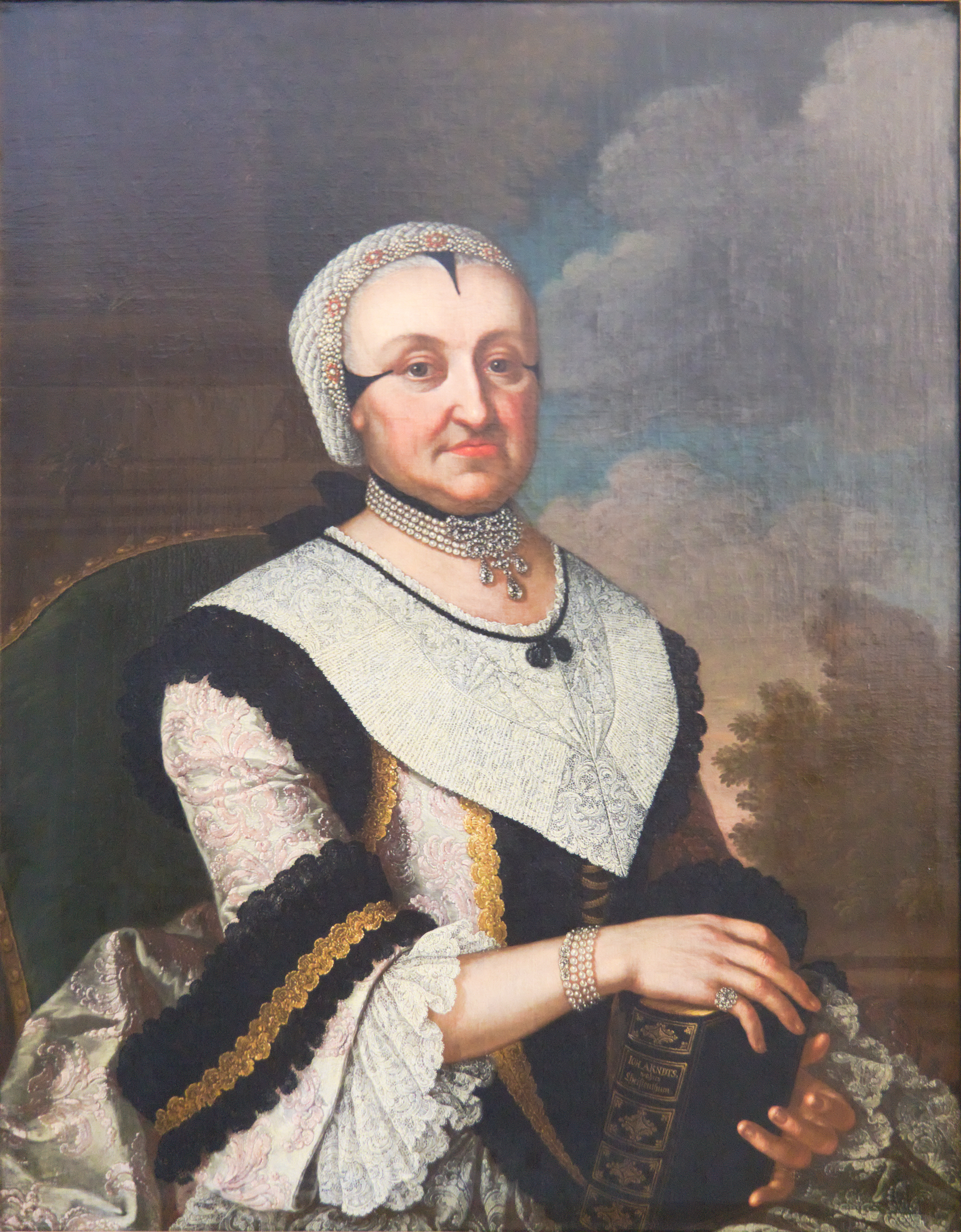
An 18th century upper-class woman wearing the traditional Augsburger Haube headgear of Protestant women from Augsburg

=== End of Free Imperial City status ===
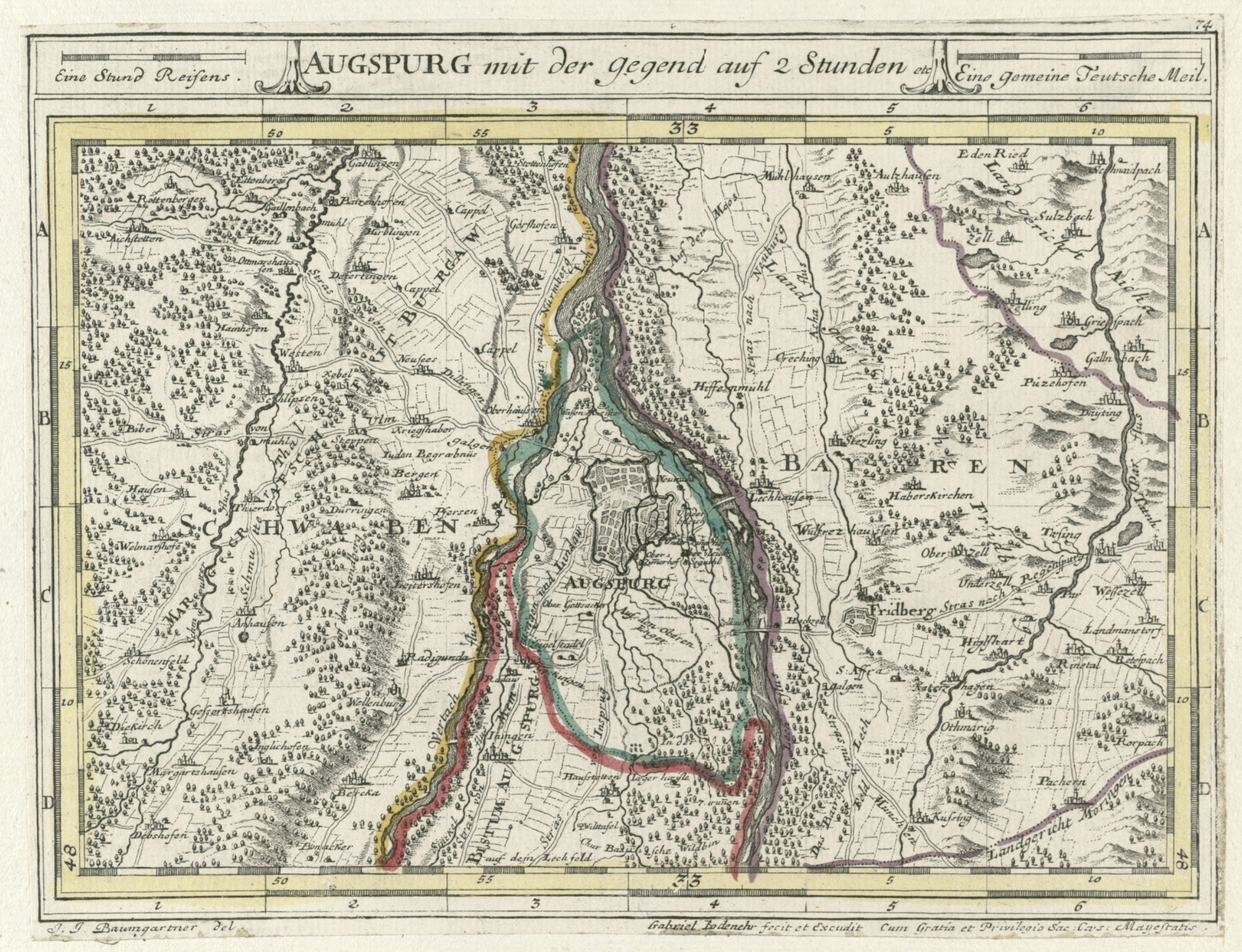
Early 18th century map of Augsburg and surrounding area

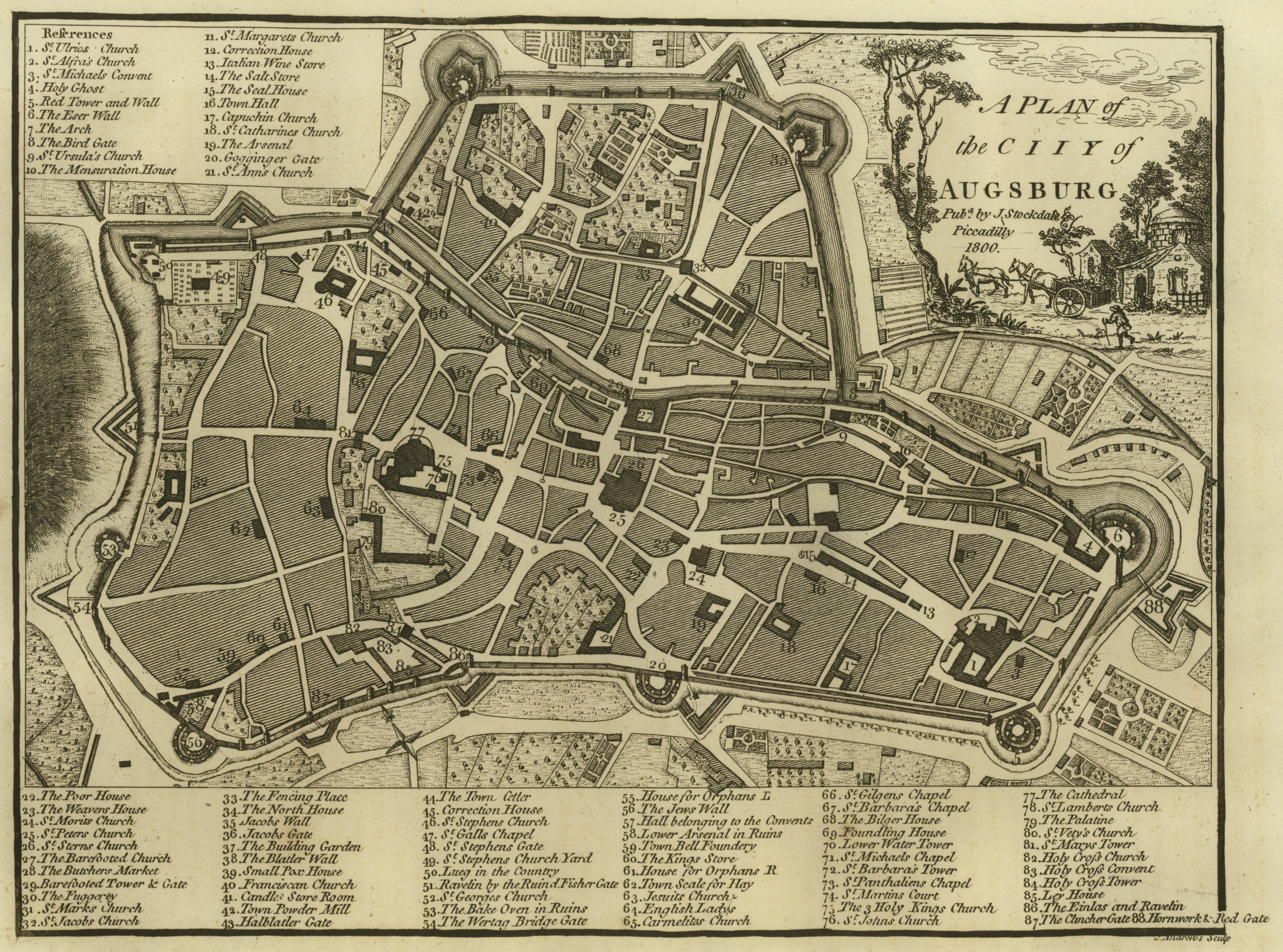
A map of Augsburg in 1800

The Reichsdeputationshauptschluss or the Final Recess of 1803, saw the annexation of nearly all of the 51 Free Imperial Cities, excepting Augsburg and five others. However, when the Holy Roman Empire was dissolved in 1806, Napoleon encouraged his German allies to annex their smaller neighbours, and Augsburg lost its independence. It was annexed to the Kingdom of Bavaria. In 1817, the city became the administrative capital of the Oberdonaukreis, then the administrative capital in 1837 for the district Swabia and Neuburg.

=== Industrial revolution ===
At the end of the 19th century, Augsburg's textile industry again rose to prominence, followed by the machine manufacturing industry.

=== Second World War and Cold War ===
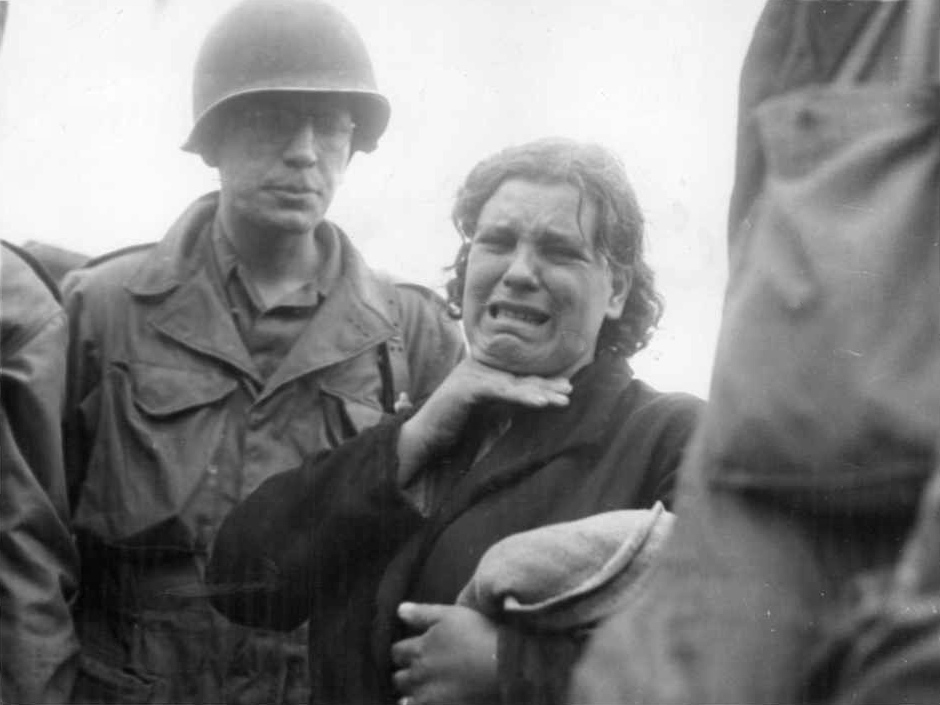
A Polish woman weeps as she tells American soldiers of her life as a slave labourer for the Nazis. She was liberated in Augsburg when the third-largest Bavarian city fell to the Americans (23 April 1945).

Augsburg was historically a militarily important city due to its strategic location. During the German rearmament before the Second World War, the Wehrmacht enlarged Augsburg's one original Kaserne (barracks) to three: Somme Kaserne (housing Wehrmacht Artillerie-Regiment 27); Arras Kaserne (housing Wehrmacht Infanterie Regiment 27), and Panzerjäger Kaserne (housing Panzerabwehr-Abteilung 27 (later Panzerjäger-Abteilung 27)). Wehrmacht Panzerjäger-Abteilung 27 was later moved to Füssen.

In 1941, Rudolf Hess, without Adolf Hitler's permission, secretly took off from a local Augsburg airport and flew to Scotland, crashing in Eaglesham, to the south of Glasgow. His objective was to meet the Duke of Hamilton in an attempt to mediate the end of the European front of World War II and join sides for the upcoming Russian Campaign.

The MAN factory at Augsburg was the largest German manufacturer of engines for U-boats in World War II and became the target of the Augsburg Raid (1942). When the Avro Lancaster bomber was new in service, the RAF sent 12 at low level to bomb the factory in daylight, on 17 April 1942. The bombers were intercepted en route and only five returned, all damaged. The factory was damaged, but production continued; the factory was repeatedly bombed later. A subcamp of the Dachau concentration camp outside Augsburg supplied approximately 1,300 forced labourers to local military-related industry, especially the Messerschmitt AG military aircraft firm, headquartered in Augsburg.

The Reichswehr Infanterie Regiment 19 was stationed in Augsburg and became the base unit for the Wehrmacht Infanterie Regiment 40, a subsection of the Wehrmacht Infanterie Division 27 (which later became the Wehrmacht Panzerdivision 17). Elements of the Wehrmacht II Battalion of Gebirgs-Jäger-Regiment 99 (especially Wehrmacht Panzerjäger Kompanie 14) were composed of parts of the Wehrmacht Infanterie Division 27. The Infanterie Regiment 40 remained in Augsburg until the end of the war, finally surrendering to the United States on 28 April 1945 when the U.S. Army occupied the city. The city and its Messerschmitt works were bombed on three occasions (1942 and 1944) during the war. Collateral damage included the destruction of just under 25% of all homes in the city and the deaths of several hundred people.

Following the war, the three Kasernen changed hands confusingly between the American and Germans, finally ending up in US hands for the duration of the Cold War. They became the three main US barracks in Augsburg: Reese, Sheridan, and FLAK. US Base FLAK had been an anti-aircraft barracks since 1936, and US Base Sheridan "united" the former infantry barracks with a smaller Kaserne for former Luftwaffe communications units.

The American military presence in the city started with the U.S. 5th Infantry Division stationed at FLAK Kaserne from 1945 to 1955, then by 11th Airborne Division, followed by the 24th Infantry Division, U.S. Army VII Corps artillery, USASA Field Station Augsburg and finally the 66th Military Intelligence Brigade, which returned the former Kaserne to German hands in 1998. Originally, the Heeresverpflegungshauptamt Südbayern and an Officers' caisson existed on or near the location of Reese-Kaserne, but it was demolished by the occupying Americans.

== Politics ==
=== Municipality ===
From 1266 until 1548, the terms Stadtpfleger (head of town council) and Mayor were used interchangeably, or occasionally, simultaneously. In 1548, the title was finally fixed to Stadtpfleger, who officiated for several years and was then awarded the title for life (though no longer governing), thus resulting confusingly, in confusing records of two or more simultaneous Stadtpfleger.

After the transfer to Bavaria in 1806, Augsburg was ruled by a Magistrate with two mayors, supported by an additional council of "Community Commissioners": the Gemeindebevollmächtige.

As of 1907, the Mayor was entitled Oberbürgermeister, as Augsburg had reached a population of 100,000, as per the Bavarian Gemeindeordnung.

=== Mayor ===
The mayor of Augsburg has been Eva Weber of the Christian Social Union (CSU) since 2020. The most recent mayoral election was held on 15 March 2020, with a runoff held on 29 March, and the results were as follows:

Candidate	Party	First round		Second round	
Candidate	Party	Votes	%	Votes	%
Eva Weber	Christian Social Union	41,534	43.1	63,762	62.3
Dirk Wurm	Social Democratic Party	18,116	18.8	38,532	37.7
Martina Wild	Alliance 90/The Greens	17,851	18.5		
Andreas Jurca	Alternative for Germany	4,673	4.8		
Peter Hummel	Free Voters of Bavaria	3,053	3.2		
Frederik Hintermayr	The Left	2,564	2.7		
Lisa McQueen	Die PARTEI	1,896	2.0		
Bruno Marcon	Augsburg in the Citizens' Hands	1,478	1.5		
Anna Tabak	We are Augsburg	1,261	1.3		
Lars Vollmar	Free Democratic Party	1,249	1.3		
Christian Pettinger	Ecological Democratic Party	1,183	1.2		
Claudia Eberle	Pro Augsburg	941	1.0		
Florian Betz	V-Partei^{3}	678	0.7		
Valid votes		96,477	99.4	102,294	99.4
Invalid votes		578	0.6	661	0.6
Total		97,055	100.0	102,955	100.0
Electorate/voter turnout		214,110	45.3	213,982	48.1
Source: City of Augsburg (first round, second round)

=== City council ===
Results of the 2020 city council election

The Augsburg city council governs the city alongside the Mayor. The most recent city council election was held on 15 March 2020, and the results were as follows:

Party	Votes	%	+/-	Seats	+/-
Christian Social Union (CSU)	1,653,781	32.3	▼5.4	20	▼3
Alliance 90/The Greens (Grüne)	1,198,090	23.4	▲11.0	14	▲7
Social Democratic Party (SPD)	734,066	14.3	▼8.1	9	▼4
Alternative for Germany (AfD)	337,834	6.6	▲0.7	4	±0
Free Voters of Bavaria (FW)	230,952	4.5	▲0.9	3	▲1
The Left (Die Linke)	189,034	3.7	▲0.5	2	±0
Free Democratic Party (FDP)	117,201	2.3	▲0.7	1	±0
Ecological Democratic Party (ÖDP)	114,119	2.2	▲0.3	1	±0
Generation AUX (GenAUX)	108,956	2.1	New	1	New
Augsburg in the Citizens' Hands (AiB)	96,690	1.9	New	1	New
Pro Augsburg (PRO A)	94,346	1.8	▼3.3	1	▼2
We are Augsburg (WSA)	77,189	1.5	New	1	New
Die PARTEI	76,557	1.5	New	1	New
V-Partei^{3}	69,643	1.4	New	1	New
Political Voters' Association/Democracy in Motion (Polit-WG/DiB)	29,149	0.6	▼2.5	0	▼1
Total	5,127,607	100.0			
Invalid votes	2,079	2.1			
Total	97,013	100.0		60	±0
Electorate/voter turnout	214,110	45.3	▲4.1		
Source: City of Augsburg

=== Members of the Bundestag ===
Augsburg is located in the Wahlkreis 251 Augsburg-Stadt constituency. Until the 2021 elections, the Wahlkreis of Augsburg included Königsbrunn and parts of the District of Augsburg (Landkreis Augsburg).

Volker Ullrich of the CSU was directly elected to the Bundestag in the 18th German Bundestag.

Indirectly elected to the Bundestag to adhere to the Landesliste were Ulrike Bahr for the SPD and Claudia Roth for Bündnis 90/Die Grünen.

== Climate ==
Augsburg has an oceanic climate (Köppen climate classification: Cfb) or, following the 0 °C isotherm, a humid continental climate (Dfb).

Climate data for Augsburg (1991–2020 normals)
Month	Jan	Feb	Mar	Apr	May	Jun	Jul	Aug	Sep	Oct	Nov	Dec	Year
Mean daily maximum °C (°F)	3.0 (37.4)	4.8 (40.6)	9.5 (49.1)	14.5 (58.1)	18.8 (65.8)	22.2 (72.0)	24.2 (75.6)	24.1 (75.4)	19.1 (66.4)	13.6 (56.5)	7.1 (44.8)	3.7 (38.7)	13.7 (56.7)
Daily mean °C (°F)	−0.1 (31.8)	0.7 (33.3)	4.4 (39.9)	8.8 (47.8)	13.2 (55.8)	16.6 (61.9)	18.3 (64.9)	18.0 (64.4)	13.4 (56.1)	8.9 (48.0)	3.9 (39.0)	0.8 (33.4)	8.9 (48.0)
Mean daily minimum °C (°F)	−3.2 (26.2)	−3.2 (26.2)	−0.3 (31.5)	2.8 (37.0)	7.2 (45.0)	10.7 (51.3)	12.2 (54.0)	11.9 (53.4)	8.0 (46.4)	4.6 (40.3)	0.7 (33.3)	−2.2 (28.0)	4.1 (39.4)
Average precipitation mm (inches)	45.1 (1.78)	34.1 (1.34)	47.3 (1.86)	45.8 (1.80)	84.8 (3.34)	92.0 (3.62)	94.3 (3.71)	91.8 (3.61)	61.9 (2.44)	52.9 (2.08)	50.2 (1.98)	49.7 (1.96)	749.4 (29.50)
Average precipitation days (≥ 0.1 mm)	14.9	14.2	14.8	12.4	14.7	16.0	15.4	14.2	13.2	14.3	14.4	16.8	175.3
Average snowy days (≥ 1.0 cm)	10.8	10.1	3.7	0.3	0	0	0	0	0	0.1	2.7	7.4	38.1
Average relative humidity (%)	86.2	82.5	78.0	72.5	72.9	73.8	73.4	74.9	81.1	85.5	89.2	88.2	79.8
Mean monthly sunshine hours	61.8	88.1	138.3	186.4	211.9	228.0	243.8	230.2	162.8	106.6	55.9	54.1	1,768.5
Source: NOAA

== Main historic sights ==
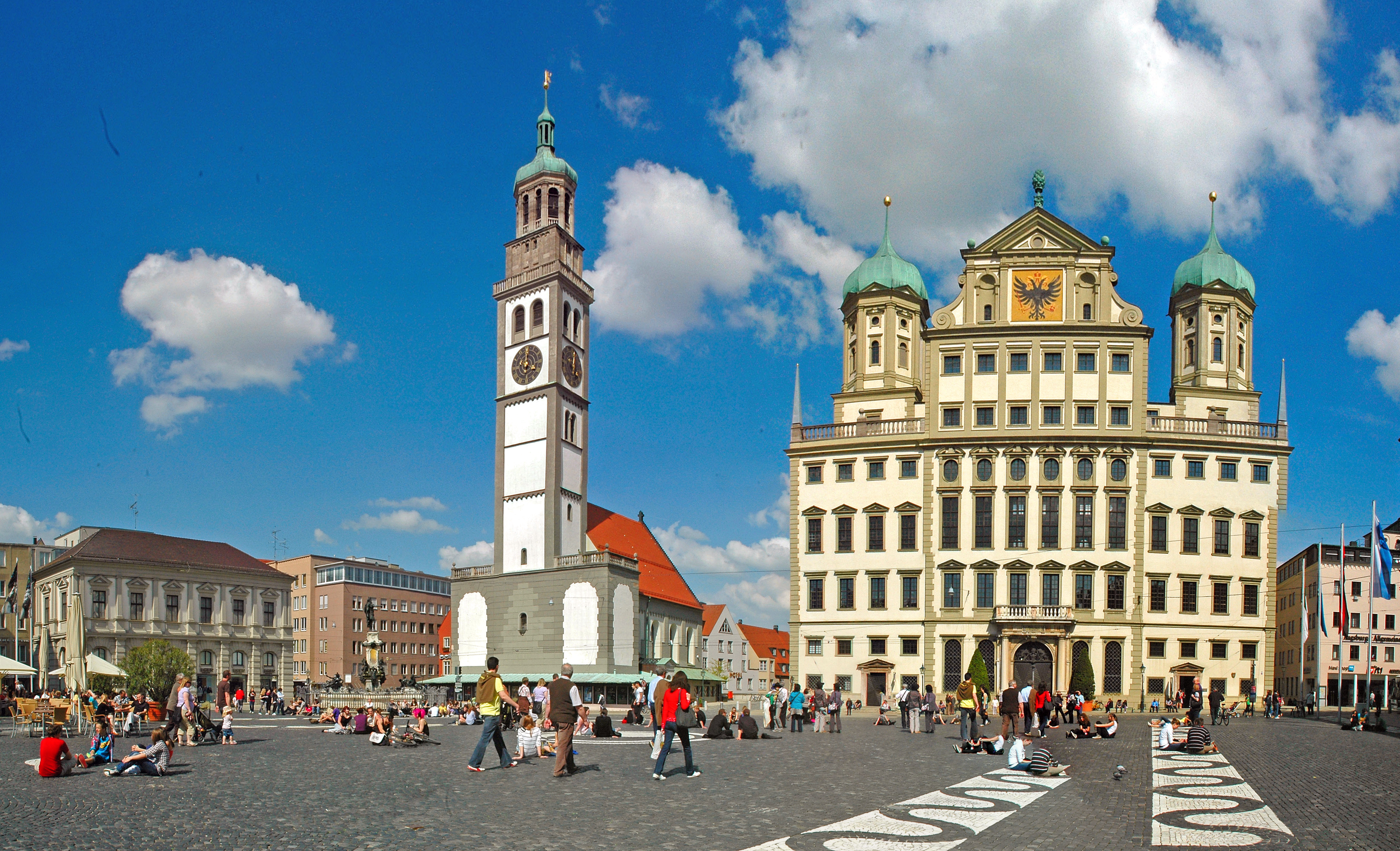
Augsburg Town Hall and Perlachturm (left)

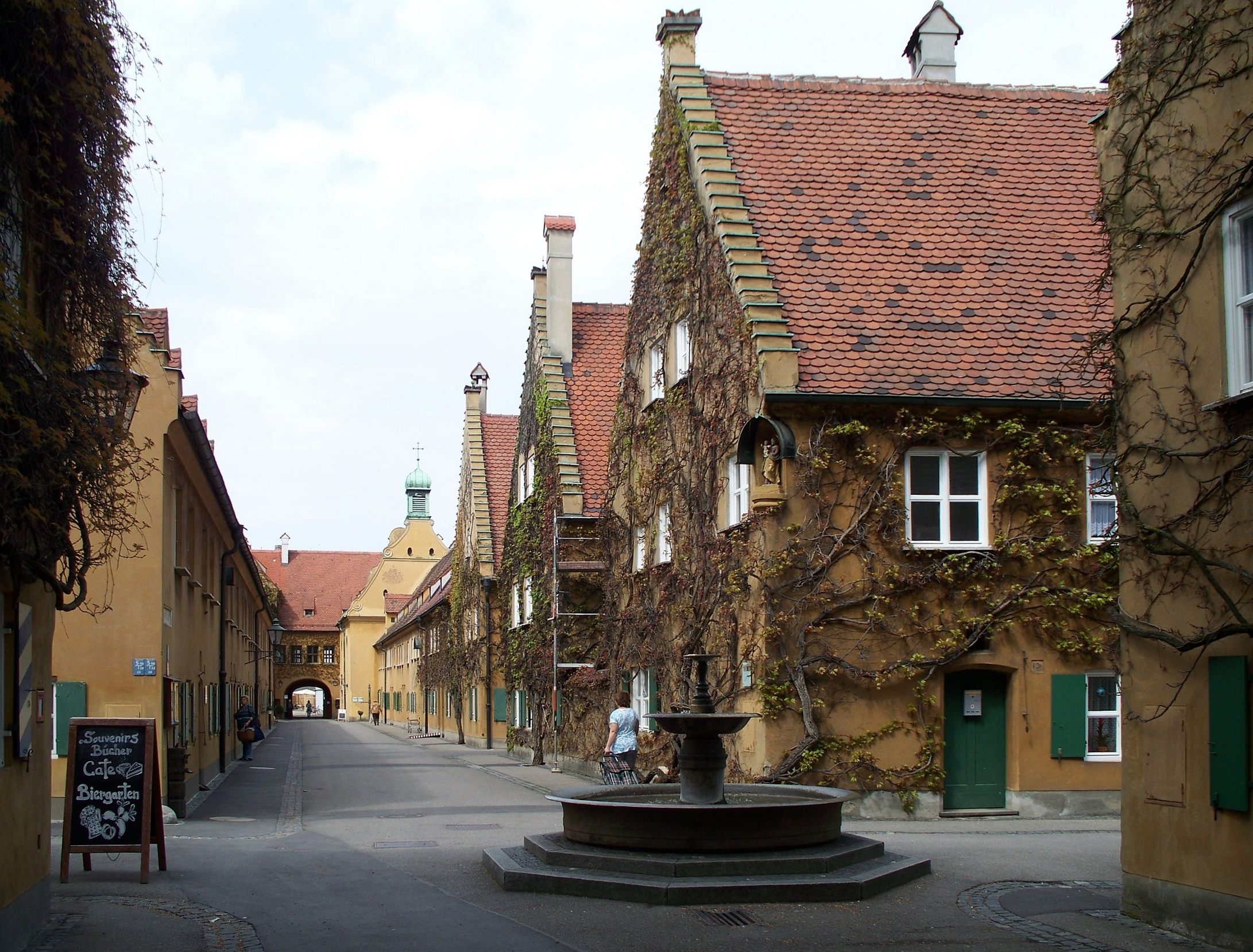
The Fuggerei

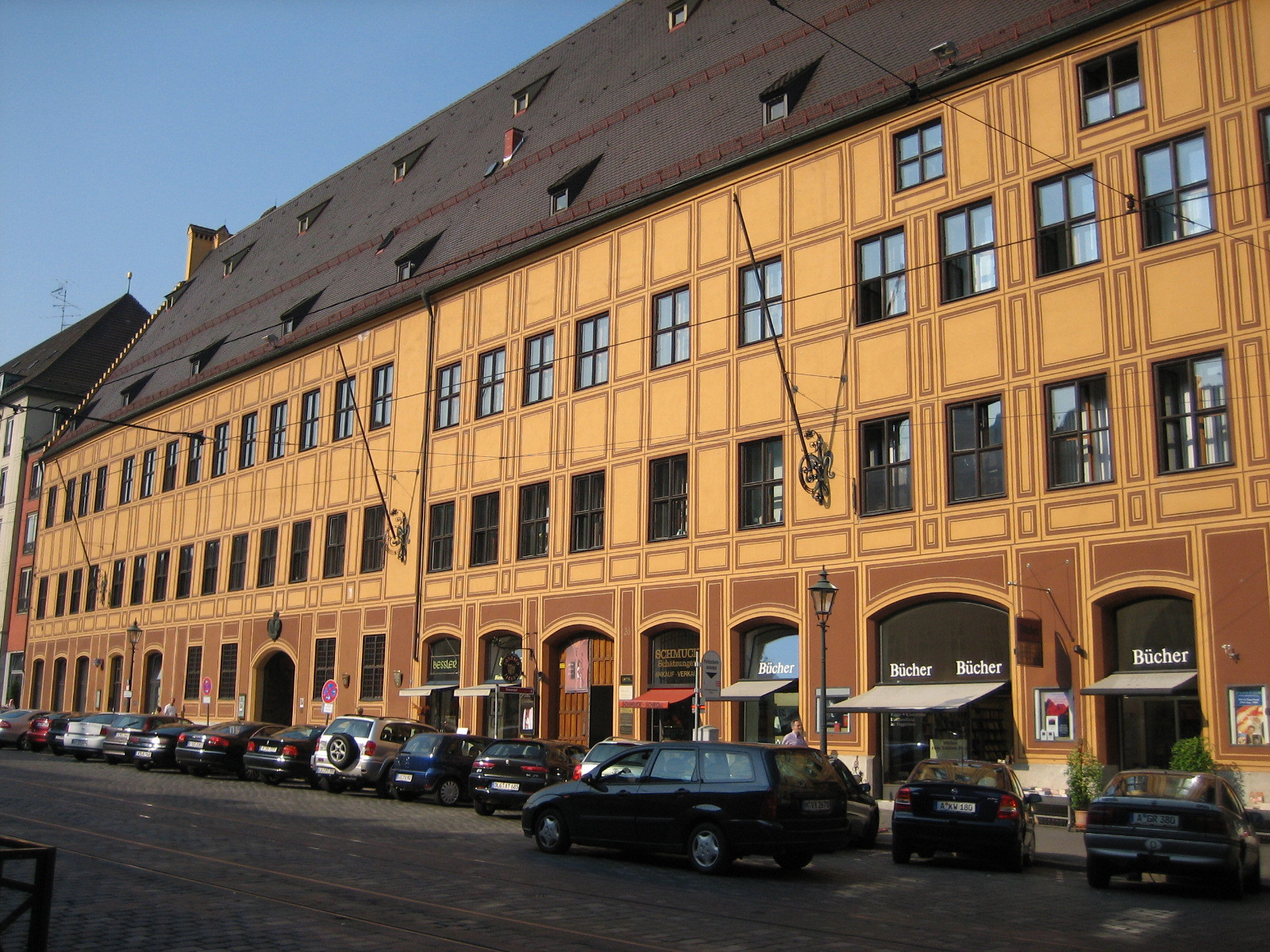
Fugger's City Palace

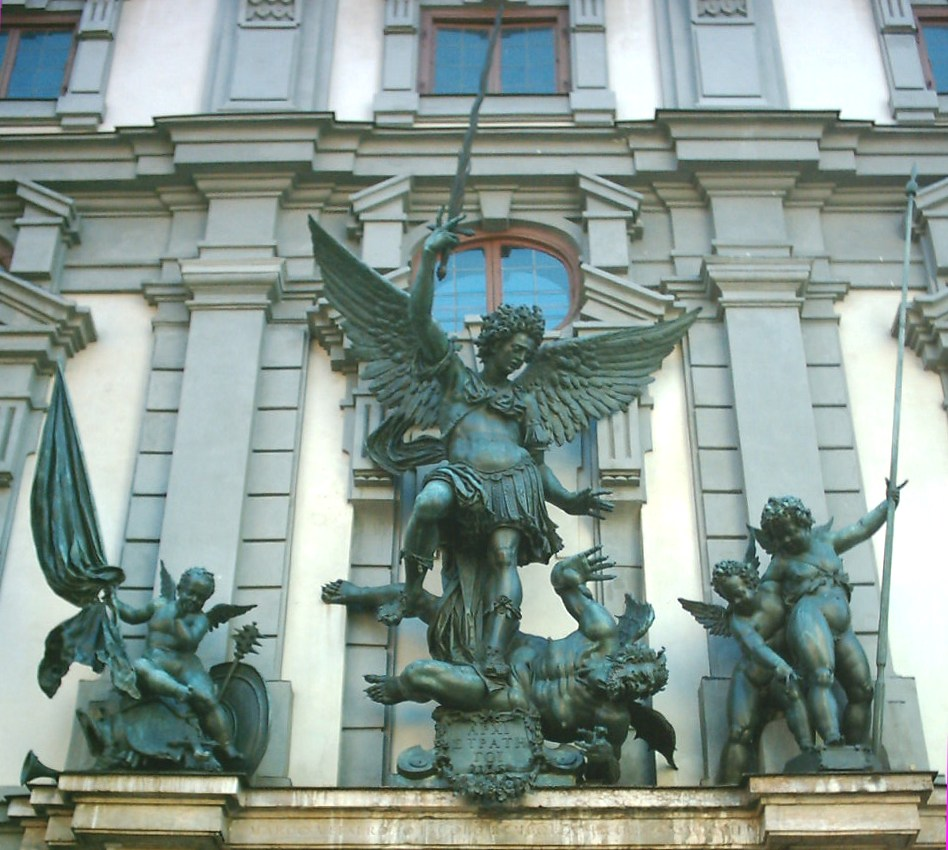
Statue of Archangel Michael in Augsburg

- Town Hall, built in 1620 in the Renaissance style with the Goldener Saal
- Perlachturm, a bell tower built in 989
- Fuggerei, the oldest social housing estate in the world, inhabited since 1523
- Fuggerhäuser (Fugger houses), restored Renaissance palatial homes of the Fugger banking family
- Bishop's Residence, built about 1750 to replace the older bishop's palace; today the administrative seat of Swabia
- Cathedral, founded in the ninth century
- St Anne's Church, a medieval church building that was originally part of a monastery built in 1321
- St Mary's Syriac Orthodox Church on the Zusamstraße in Lechhausen, built 1998 by local Assyrians
- Augsburg Synagogue, one of the few German synagogues to survive the war, is now restored and open with a Jewish museum inside
- Augsburg textile and industry museum (stylized as "tim" for short) organises its displays under headings Mensch-Maschine-Muster-Mode.
- Schaezlerpalais, a Rococo mansion (1765) now housing a major art museum
- St Ulrich and St Afra – of these neighboring churches, one is Roman Catholic, the other is Lutheran, the duality being a result of the Peace of Augsburg concluded in 1555 between Catholics and Protestants
- Mozart Haus Augsburg (where the composer's father Leopold Mozart was born and Mozart visited several times)
- Augsburger Puppenkiste, a puppet theatre
- Luther Stiege, a museum located in a church that shows Martin Luther's life and various rooms. (free admission)
- Eiskanal, the world's first artificial whitewater course (venue for the whitewater events of the 1972 Munich Olympics)
- Dorint Hotel Tower
- Childhood home of Bertolt Brecht
- The Augsburg Botanical Gardens (Botanischer Garten Augsburg)
- Maximillian Museum, decorative arts
- Bahnpark Augsburg home of 29 historic locomotives, blacksmith, historic roundhouse
- 3 magnificent Renaissance fountains, the Augustus Fountain, Mercury Fountain, and Hercules Fountain from the 15th century, built for the 1500th anniversary of the foundation of the city
- Walter Art Museum at the Glas Palast ("Glas-Palace")
- Roman Museum in the former Monastery of St Magdalena. In December 2012, the church was closed owing to the risk of collapse. In 2015, an exhibition opened in the Zeughaus, which will replace the museum for an indefinite period. Renovation work is ongoing and the Church will remain closed until further notice.
- Medieval canals, used to run numerous industries, including medieval arms production, silver art, sanitation, and water pumping
- Kulturhaus Abraxas
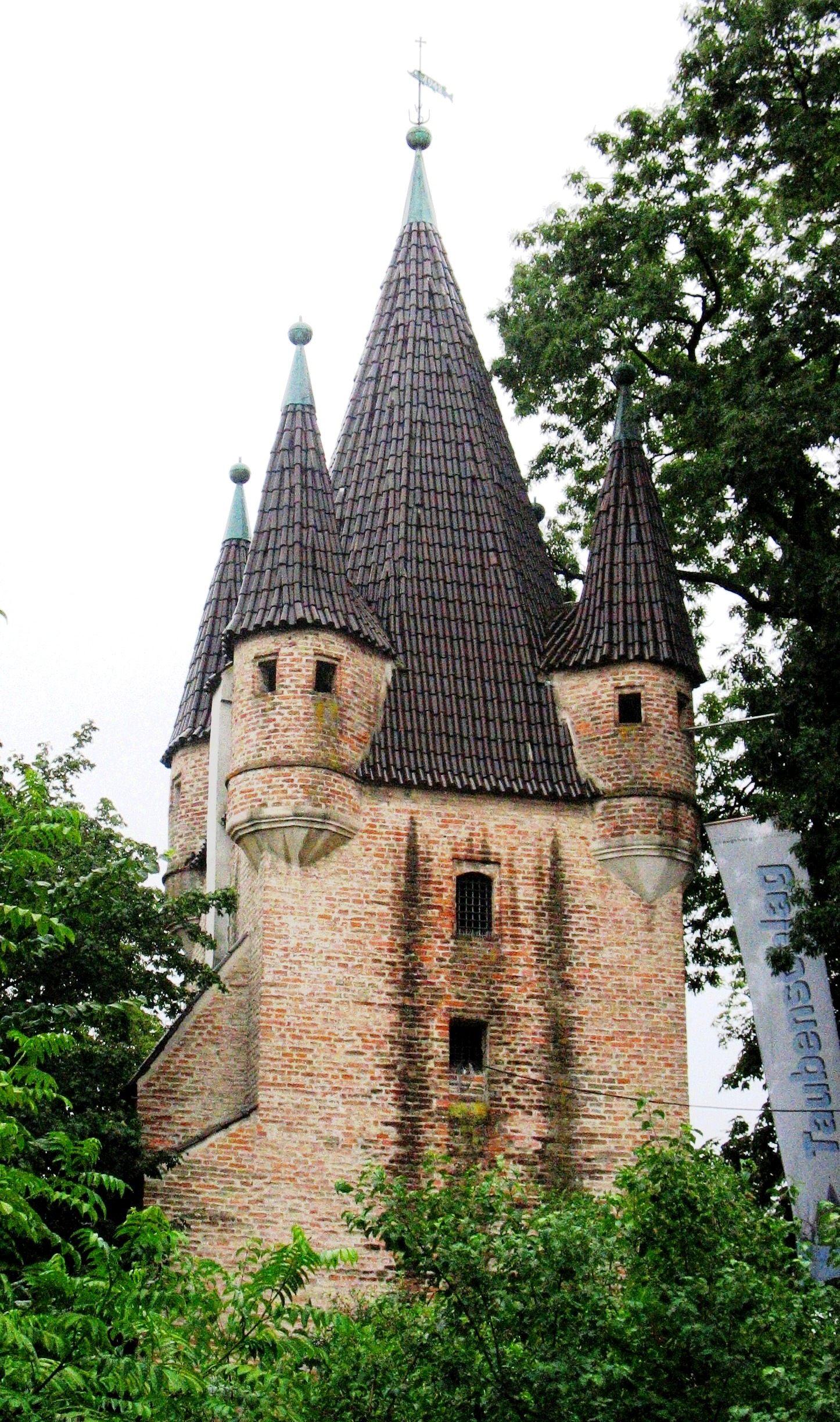
Fünfgratturm tower

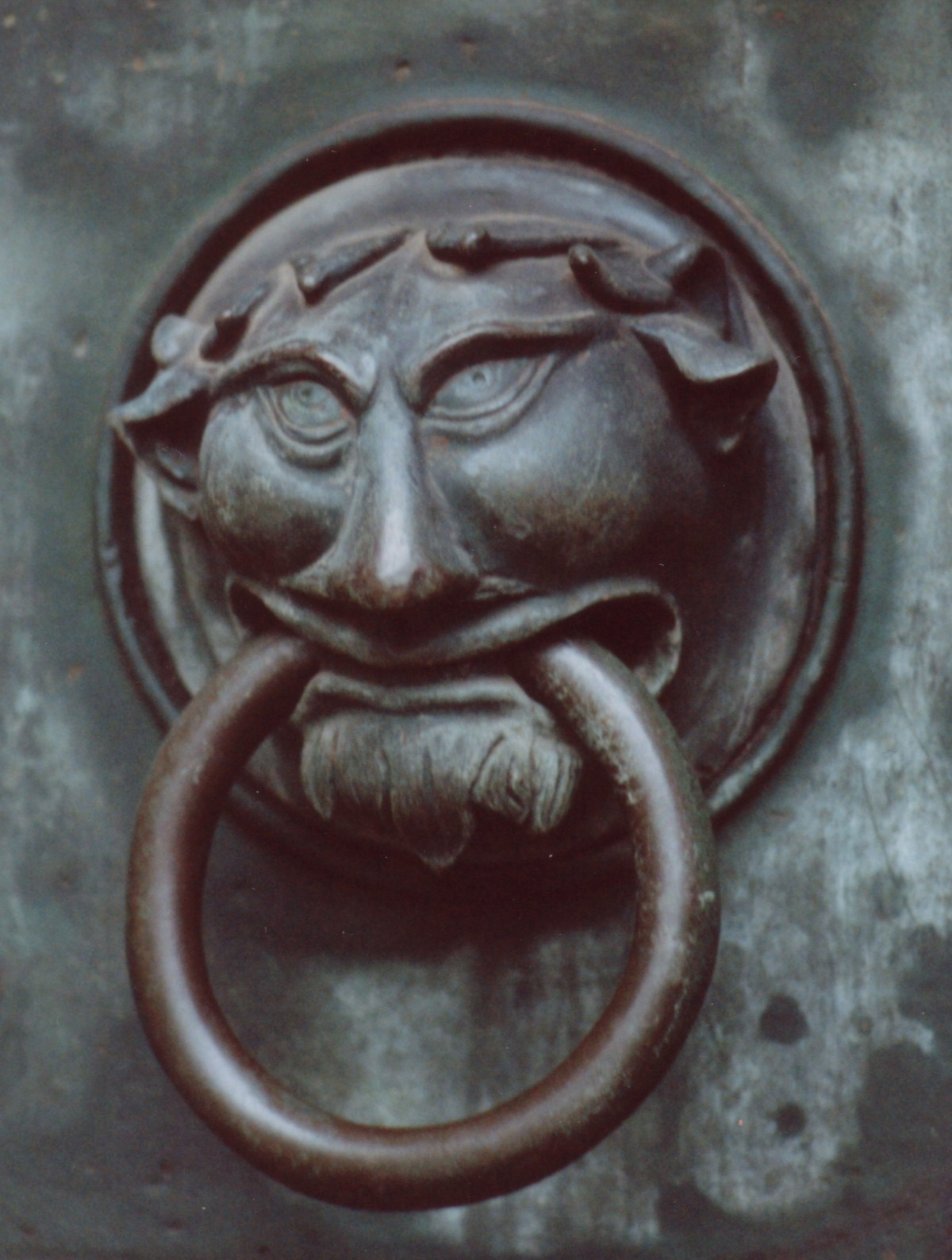
Ring of Mercy on the Dom (Cathedral) St Maria

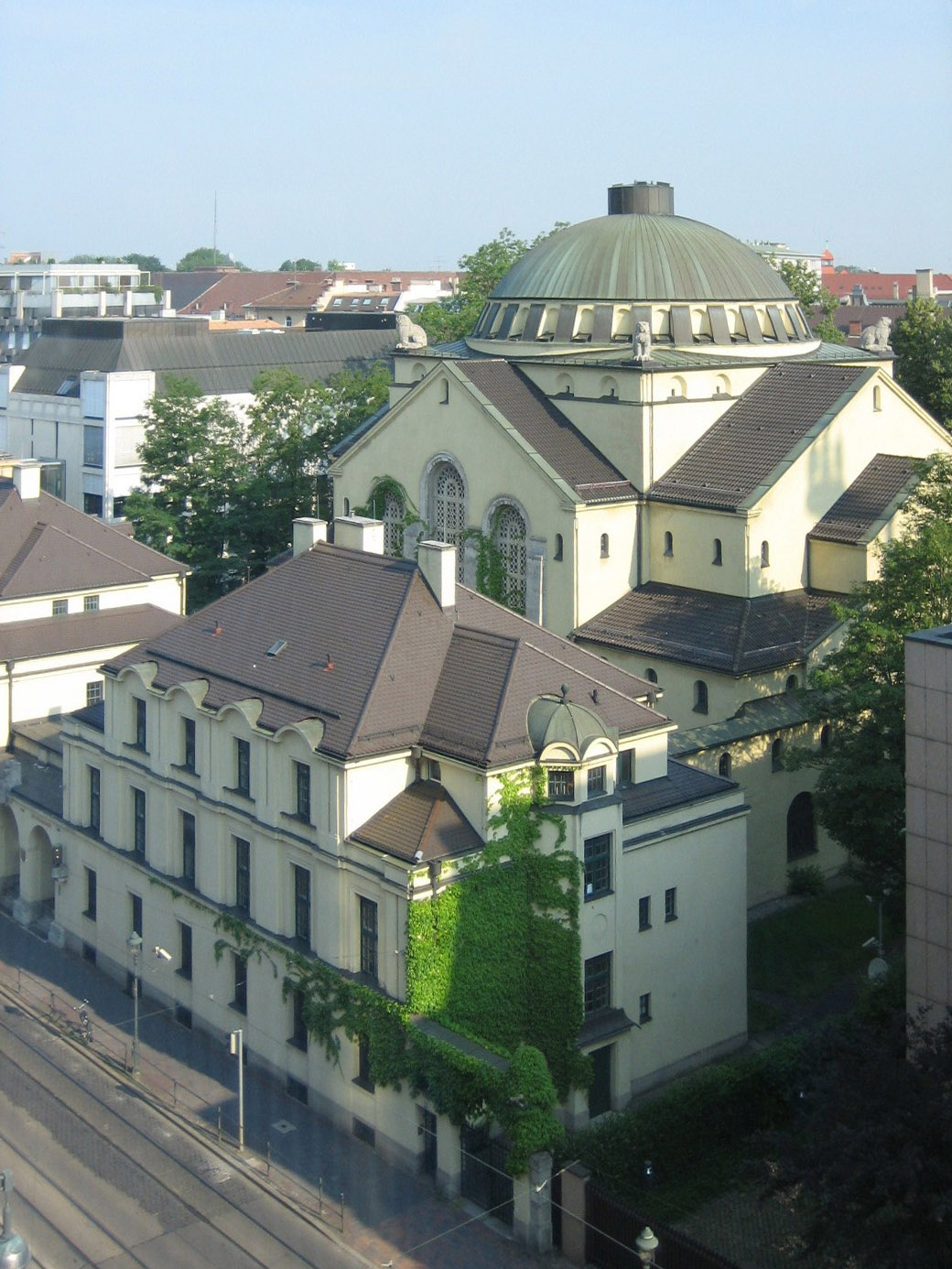
Augsburg Synagogue

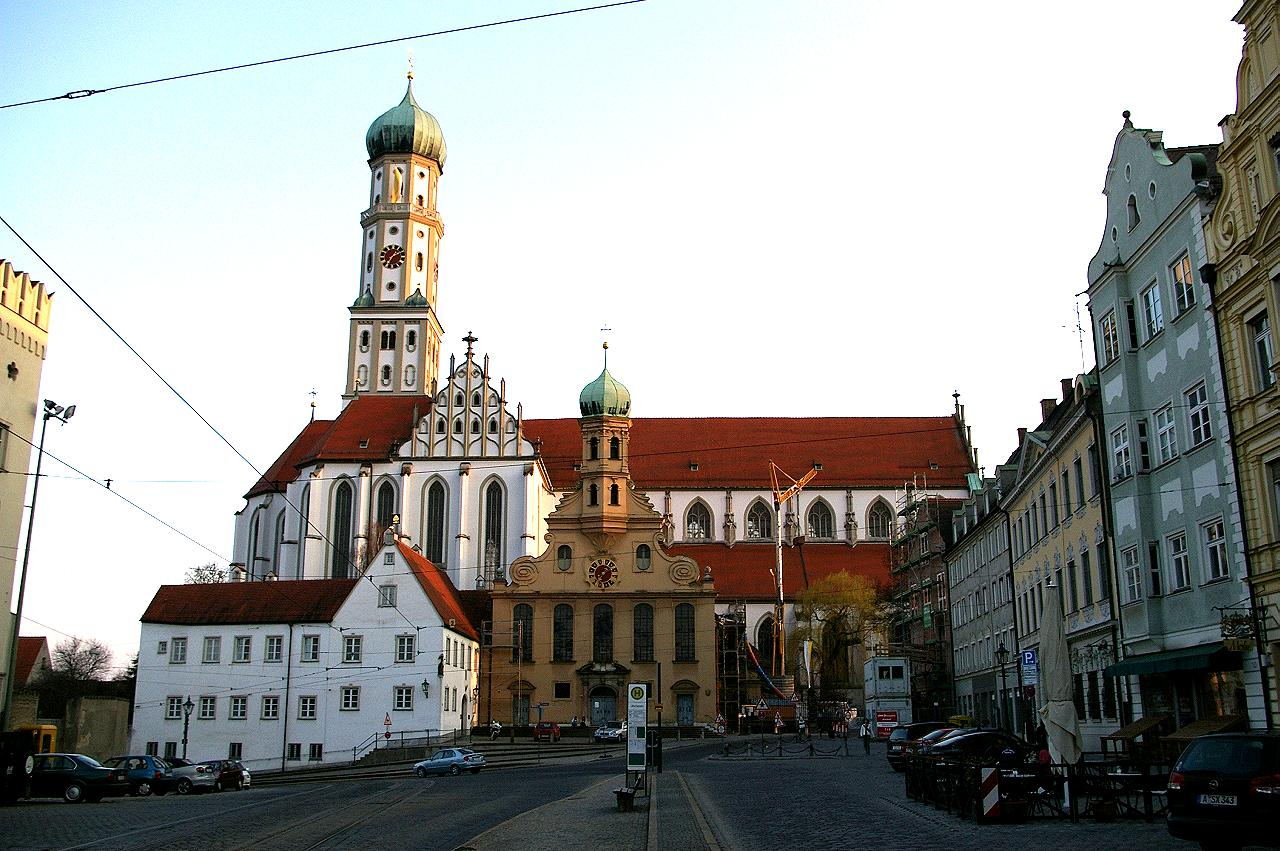
St. Ulrich and St. Afra Cathedral

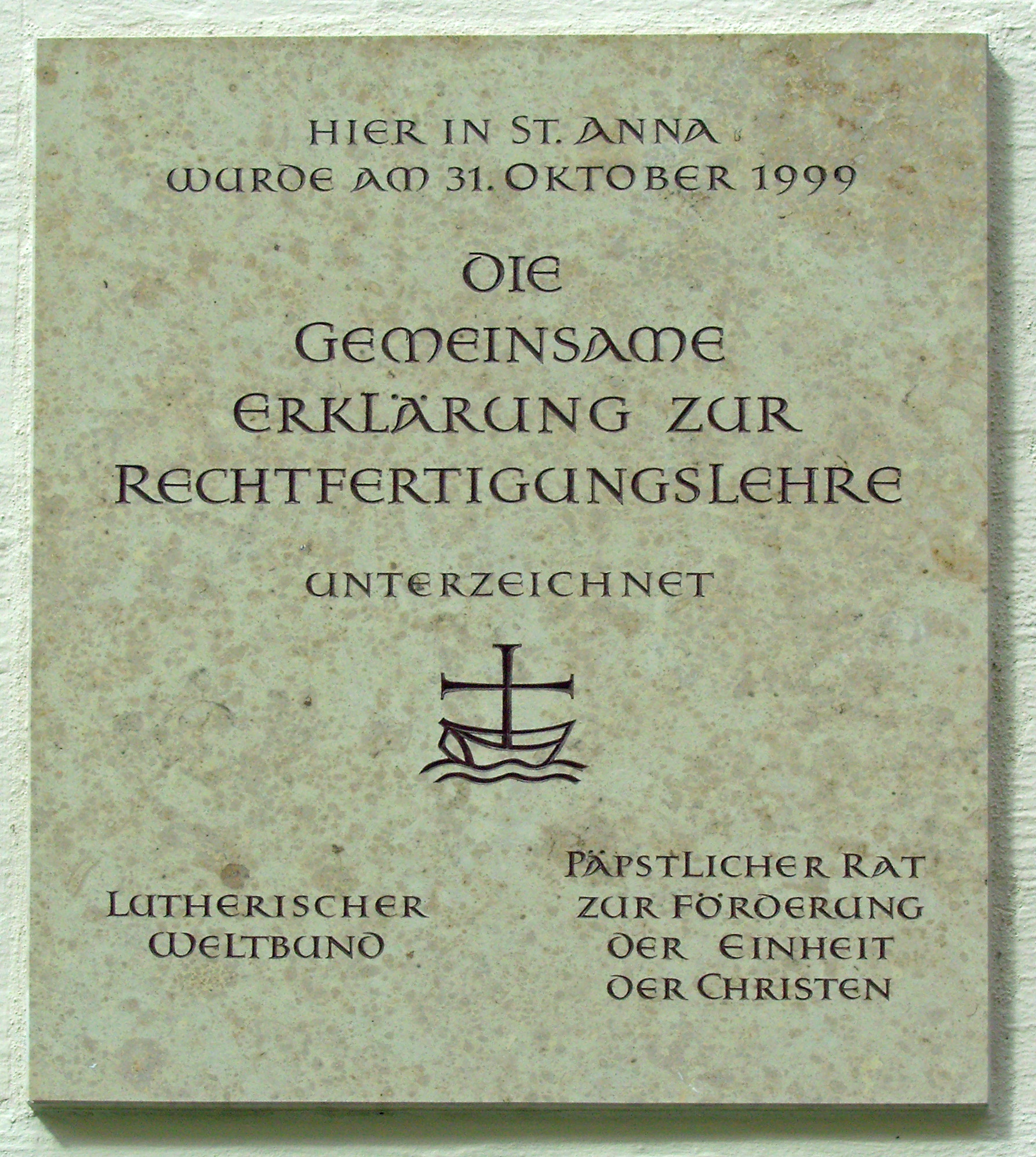
Plaque commemorating the Joint Declaration on the Doctrine of Justification at St. Anne's Church

== Water Management System ==
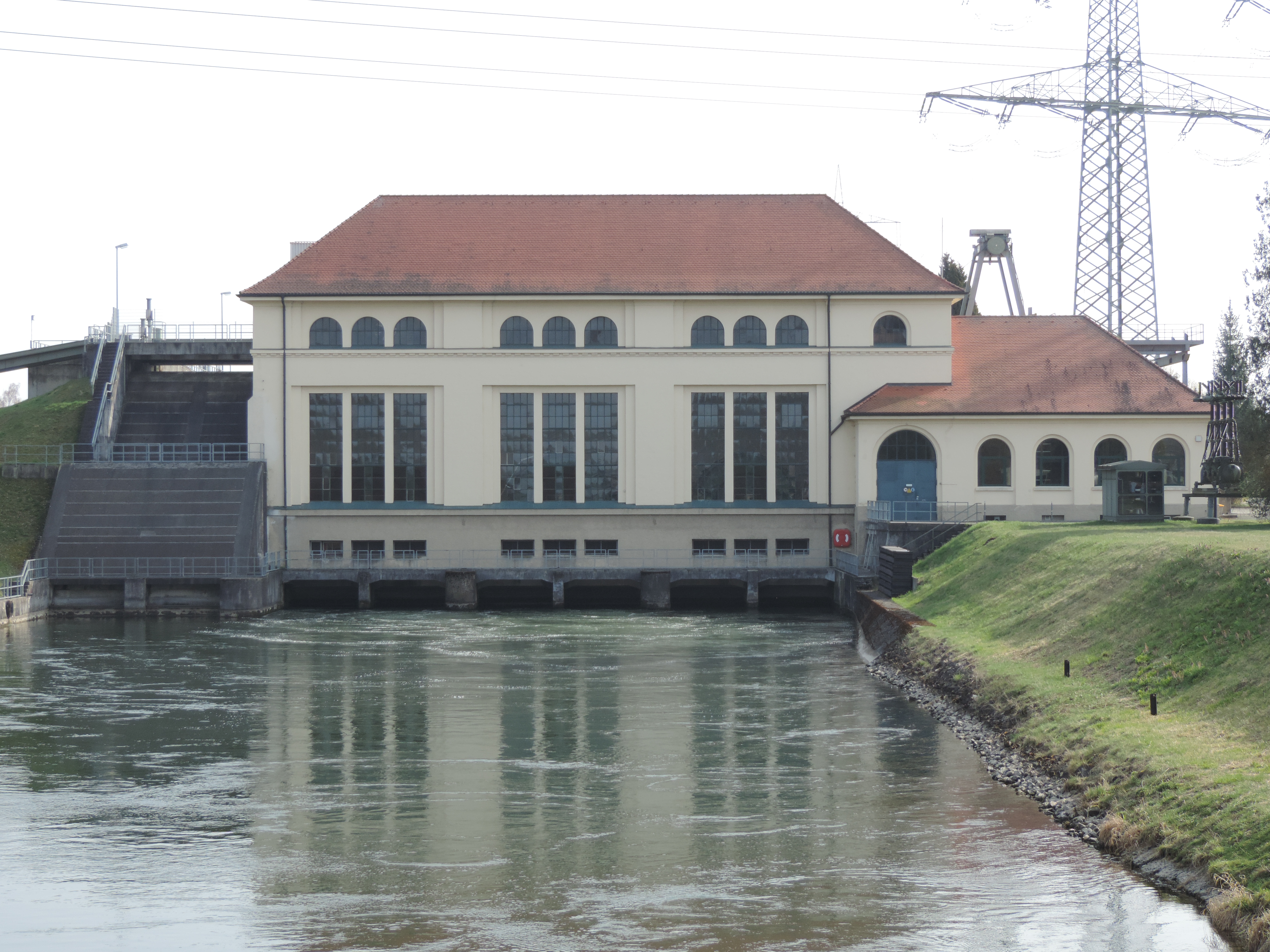
Water Management System in Meitingen

The water systems of Augsburg have been the site of innovations in hydraulic engineering for centuries. Augsburg was built on top of an aquifer fed by the Lech and Wertach rivers, which provided purified groundwater that ran through the city through springs and streams. The canals were first mentioned in 1276, and by 1416 waterworks, pumps, and water towers were added to distribute this water effectively. In 1545, Augsburg was one of the first European towns to separate drinking water from water used for industry, effectively preventing water-borne diseases. The pumps and waterwheels also generated power for fountains and food processing, such as a 17th-century butcher's hall that still stands today.

In the 19th and 20th centuries, hydroelectric power plants were also installed. These power plants were some of the first in the world to generate electricity from water, and they are still in use today. On 6 July 2019 the Water Management System of Augsburg was designated as a UNESCO World Heritage Site.

== Incorporations ==
Year	Municipality	Area
1 July 1910	Meringerau	9.5 km^{2}
1 January 1911	Pfersee	3.5 km^{2}
1 January 1911	Oberhausen	8.6 km^{2}
1 January 1913	Lechhausen	27.9 km^{2}
1 January 1913	Hochzoll	4.4 km^{2}
1 April 1916	Kriegshaber	59 km^{2}
1 July 1972	Göggingen	
1 July 1972	Haunstetten	
1 July 1972	Inningen	

== Population ==
Historical population
Year	Pop.	±%
1635	16,432	—
1645	19,960	+21.5%
1806	26,200	+31.3%
1830	29,019	+10.8%
1871	51,220	+76.5%
1890	75,629	+47.7%
1900	89,109	+17.8%
1910	102,487	+15.0%
1916	146,226	+42.7%
1925	165,522	+13.2%
1933	176,575	+6.7%
1939	185,369	+5.0%
1945	146,416	−21.0%
1950	185,183	+26.5%
1961	208,659	+12.7%
1970	211,566	+1.4%
1975	252,000	+19.1%
1980	246,600	−2.1%
1985	244,200	−1.0%
1990	256,877	+5.2%
2001	257,836	+0.4%
2011	267,767	+3.9%
2022	294,647	+10.0%
Population size may be affected by changes in administrative divisions.

Augsburg has a population of about 300,000. It is the third largest city in Bavaria and the largest city in the Swabia region. In the 16th century, Augsburg was one of the largest cities in the Holy Roman Empire, with a population of about 30,000. This put it on a level with cities like Cologne and Prague. Augsburg passed 100,000 residents in 1909, and the population has grown steadily since then. In 2015, the Diocese of Augsburg had 1,325,316 Catholics, which was 57.2% of the total population. Bavaria is the largest Catholic religious group in Germany, with Catholics making up 57% of the population.

Largest groups of foreign residents
Nationality	Population (31 December 2022)
Turkey	11,701
Romania	7,242
Ukraine	5,382
Italy	4,280
Croatia	4,123
Poland	2,581
Syria	2,332
Greece	2,249
Iraq	2,169
Hungary	2,107
Bosnia and Herzegovina	1,823
Kosovo	1,650

== Twin towns – sister cities ==
Augsburg is twinned with:

- Amagasaki, Japan (1959)
- Bourges, France (1963)
- Dayton, United States (1964)
- Inverness, Scotland, UK (1956)
- Jinan, China (2004)
- Liberec, Czech Republic (2001)
- Nagahama, Japan (1959)

== Transport ==
=== Roads ===
The main road link is autobahn A 8 between Munich and Stuttgart.

==== Public transport ====
Public transport is very well catered for. It is controlled by the Augsburger Verkehrs- und Tarifverbund (Augsburg transport and tariff association, AVV) extended over central Swabia. There are seven regional rail lines, five tram lines, 27 city bus lines, and six night bus lines, as well as several taxi companies.

The Augsburg tramway network is now 49.8 km-long after the opening of new lines to the university in 1996, the northern city boundary, and to the Klinikum Augsburg (Augsburg hospital) in 2001. Tram line 6, which runs 5.2 km from Friedberg West to Hauptbahnhof (Central Station), opened in December 2010. In December 2021, tram line 3 was extended southward to the neighboring city of Königsbrunn.

==== Intercity bus ====
There is one station for intercity bus services in Augsburg: Augsburg Nord, located in the north of the city.

=== Railway ===
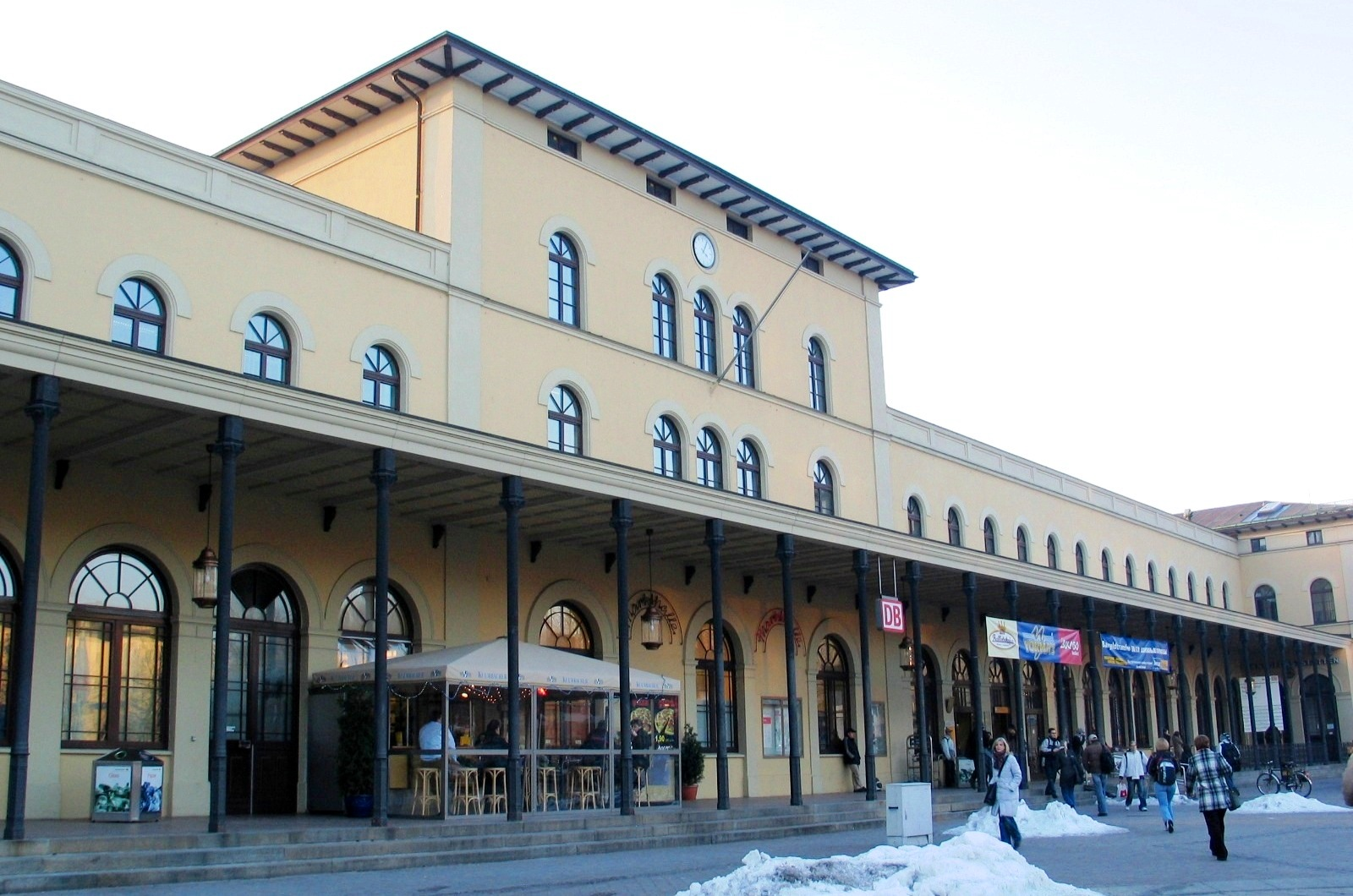
The front of the station

Augsburg has seven stations, the Central Station (Hauptbahnhof), Hochzoll, Oberhausen, Haunstetterstraße, Morellstraße, Messe and Inningen. The Central Station, built from 1843 to 1846, is Germany's oldest main station in a large city, still providing services in the original building. It is currently being modernised and an underground tram station is being built underneath it. Hauptbahnhof is on the Munich–Augsburg and Ulm–Augsburg lines and is connected by ICE and IC services to Munich, Berlin, Dortmund, Frankfurt, Hamburg and Stuttgart. As of December 2007, the French TGV connected Augsburg with a direct high-speed connection to Paris. In addition, EC and night train services connect to Amsterdam, Paris, and Vienna, and connections will be substantially improved by the creation of the planned Magistrale for Europe.

The AVV operates seven Regionalbahn lines from the main station to:

- Mammendorf
- Schmiechen (direction to Ammersee)
- Aichach/Radersdorf
- Meitingen/Donauwörth
- Dinkelscherben
- Schwabmünchen
- Klosterlechfeld

Starting in 2008, the regional services are planned to be altered to S-Bahn frequencies and developed long-term as integrated into the Augsburg S-Bahn.

=== Air transport ===
Until 2005, Augsburg was served by nearby Augsburg Airport (AGB). In that year, all air passenger transport was relocated to Munich Airport. Since then, the airport has been used almost entirely by business airplanes.

== Economy ==
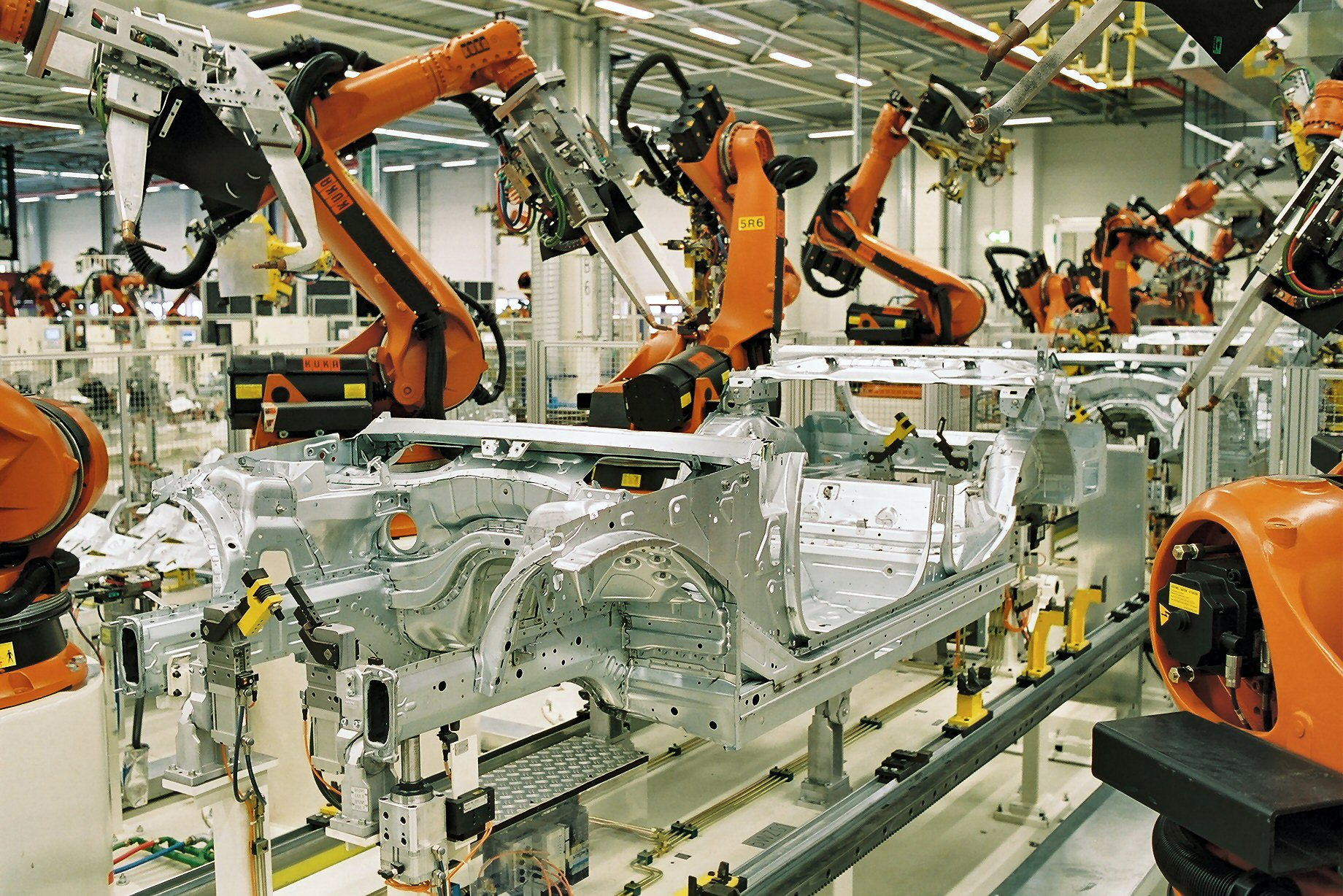
KUKA spot welding in the automotive industry

Augsburg is an industrial city. Many technology firms including, MAN, EADS or KUKA produce products like printing systems, large diesel engines, industrial robots or components for the Airbus A380 and the Ariane carrier rocket. Augsburg is considered a high-tech centre for information and communications technology in Bavaria and is in close proximity to Munich. In 2018 the Bavarian State Government recognised this fact.

=== Major companies ===
- Boewe Systec
- Faurecia
- Fujitsu Technology Solutions
- KUKA
- MAN SE
- MAN Roland
- MT Aerospace
- NCR
- Premium AEROTEC
- Renk
- Siemens
- UPM-Kymmene
- WashTec
- Synlab Group
- Cancom
- Check24
- Amazon
- Patrizia Immobilien

== Education ==
Augsburg is home to the following universities and colleges:

- University of Augsburg, founded in 1970
- Technische Hochschule Augsburg (University of Applied Sciences, formerly Fachhochschule Augsburg)

== Media ==
The local newspaper is the Augsburger Allgemeine first published in 1807.

== Notable people ==
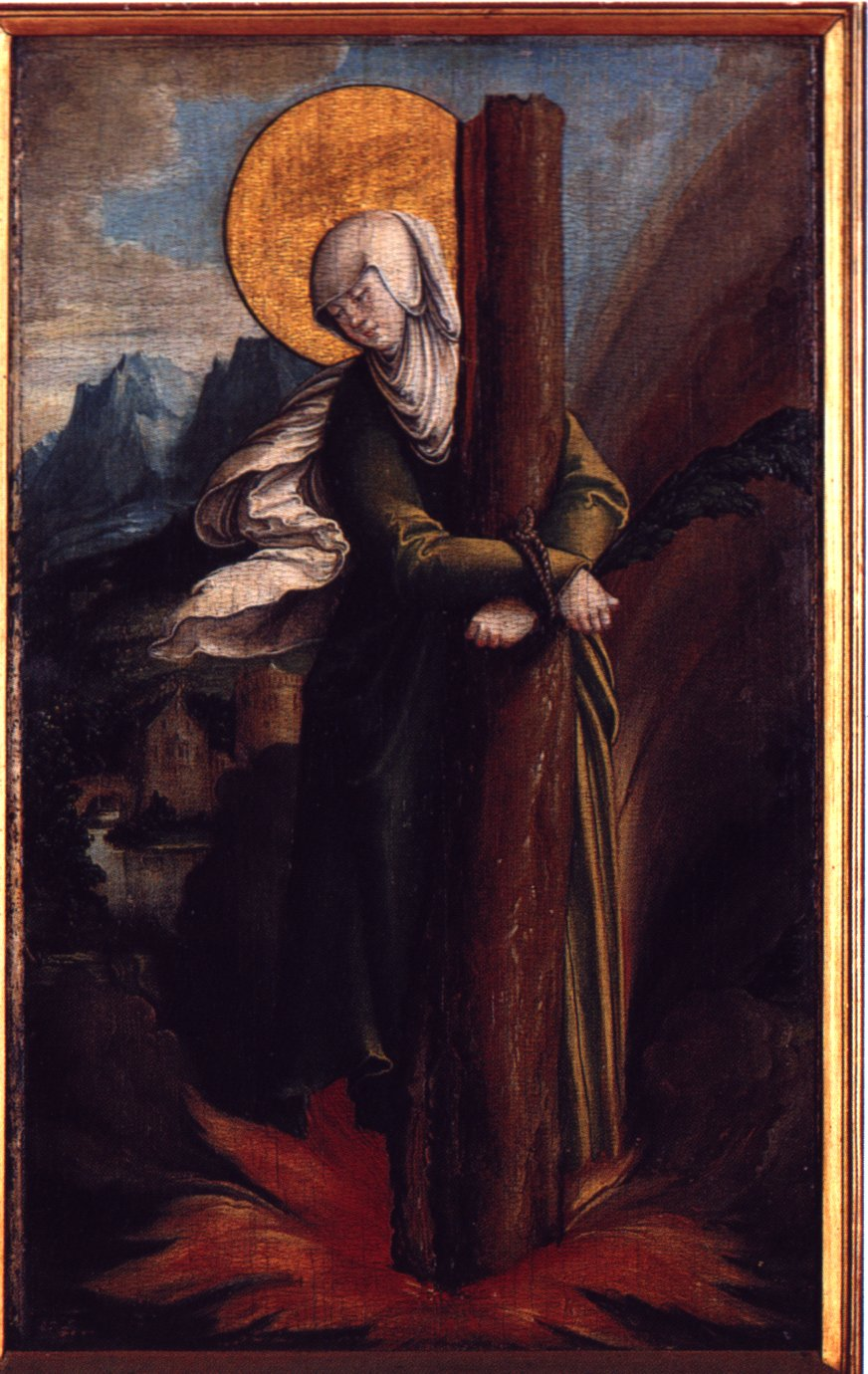
Saint Afra

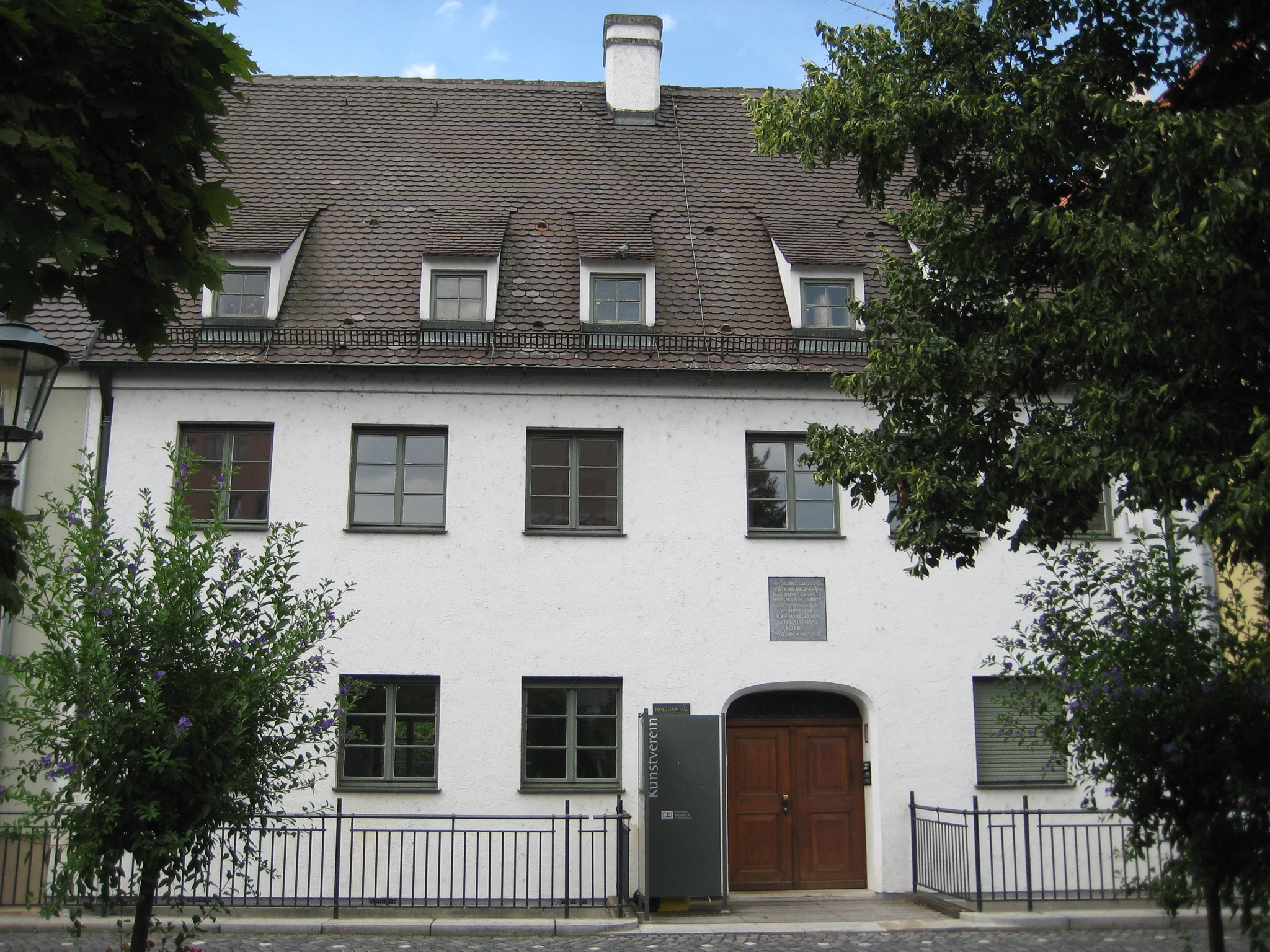
Holbein's house

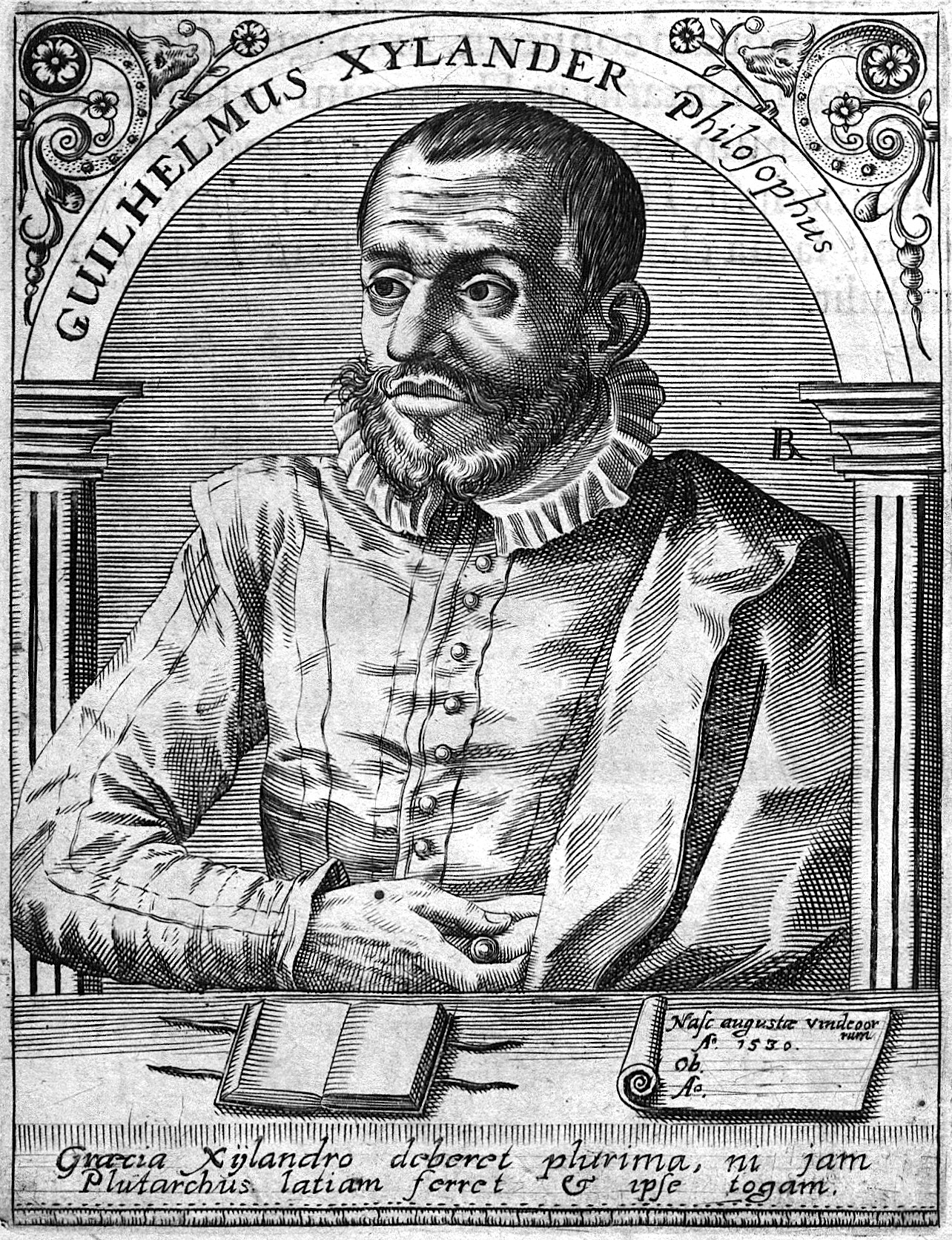
Guilehelmus Xylander, 1669

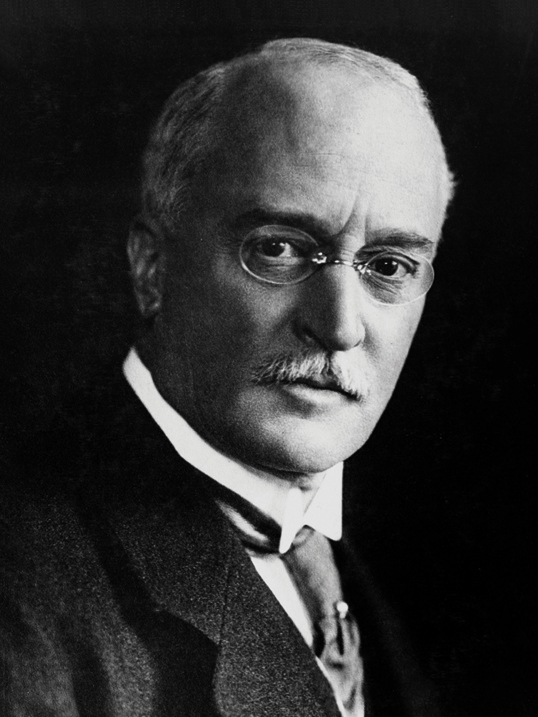
Rudolf Diesel, c. 1900

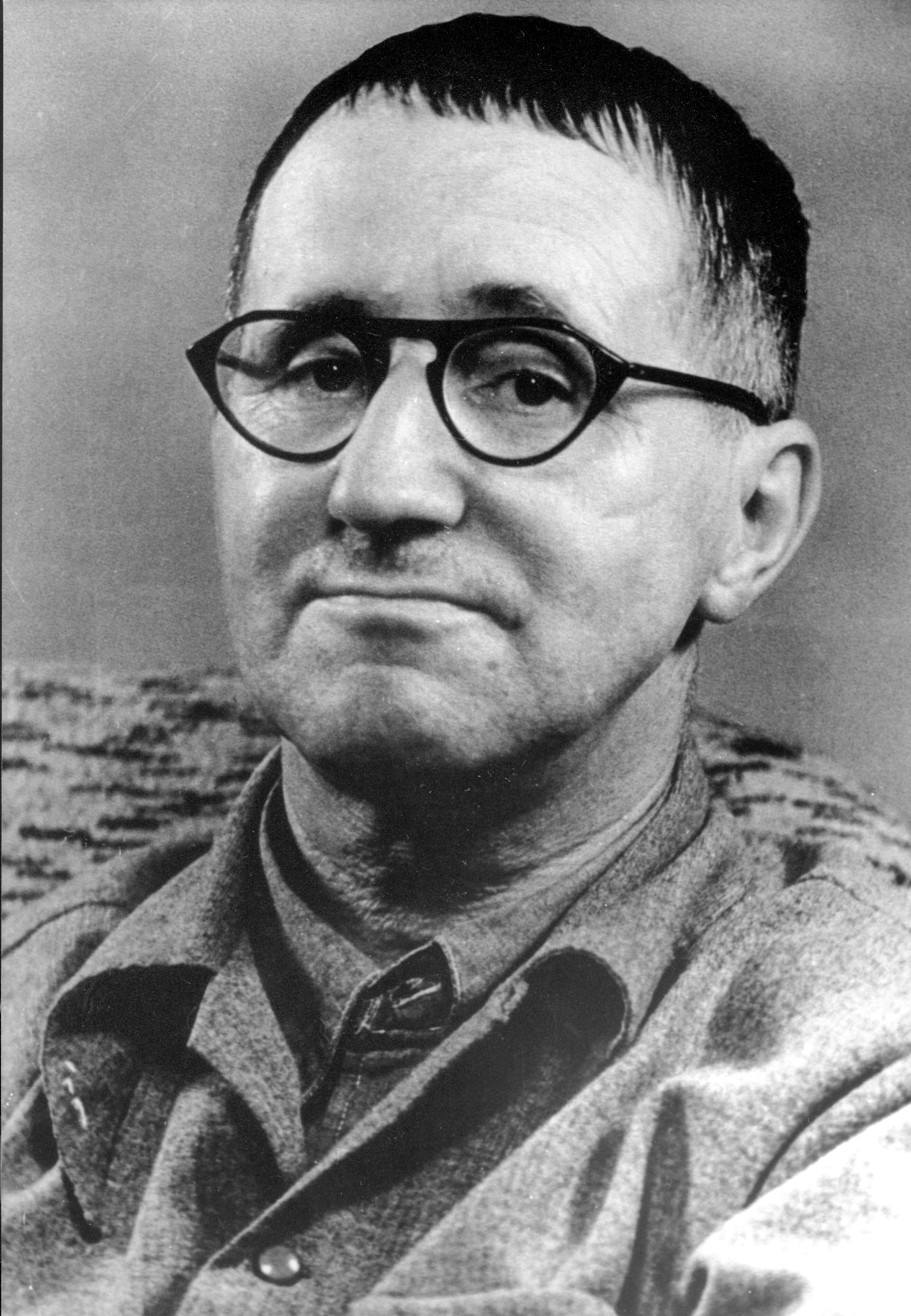
Bertolt Brecht, 1954

- Saint Afra (died 304), patron Saint of Augsburg, martyr
- Simpert (died 807), abbot, bishop, and confessor
- Saint Ulrich (c. 890–973), Prince-Bishopric of Augsburg
- Saint Wolfhard (1070–1127), Swabian artisan, trader, and hermit
- Hiltgart von Hürnheim (c. 1250– after 1299), Cistercian nun and translator
- Jakob Fugger the Elder (1398–1469), master weaver, town councillor and merchant
- Erhard Ratdolt (1442–1528), Printer, famous for having produced the first known printer's type specimen book
- Jakob Fugger (1459–1525), Noted banker and financial broker. An area within the city, called the Fuggerei, was set aside for the poor and needy in 1519.
- Hans Holbein the Elder (1460–1524), pioneer in the transformation of German art from the Gothic to the Renaissance style
- Konrad Peutinger (1465–1547), humanist, jurist, diplomat, politician, economist, and archaeologist
- Hans Burgkmair (1473–1531), painter and woodcut printmaker
- Caspar Aquila (1488–1560), Lutheran theologian and reformer
- Hans Holbein the Younger (1497–1543), portrait and religious painter
- Matthäus Schwarz (1497–c. 1574), accountant and author
- Paulus Hector Mair (1517–1579), martial artist
- Wilhelm Xylander (1532–1576), classical scholar and humanist
- Elias Holl (1573–1646), architect
- Philipp Hainhofer (1578–1647), merchant, banker, diplomat, and art collector
- Julius Schiller (1580–1627), lawyer and astronomer
- Johann Georg Wirsung (1589–1643), anatomist
- Johann Jakob Brucker (1696–1770), German historian of philosophy
- Andreas Christoph Graf (1701–1776), German teacher, author, and poet
- Johann Jakob Haid (1704–1767), engraver
- Leopold Mozart (1719–1787), violinist-composer, father of Wolfgang Amadeus Mozart
- Christoph Christian Sturm (1740–1786), preacher and author
- Gerhard Adam Neuhofer (1773–1816), deacon and historian
- Eduard Bayer (1822–1908), composer and classical guitarist
- Emil Schürer (1844–1910), Protestant theologian. He studied the history of the Jews.
- Johann Most (1846–1906), Social Democratic and then anarchist politician, newspaper editor, and orator
- Rudolf Diesel (1858–1913), inventor of the diesel engine
- Albert Rehm (1871–1949), philologist who first understood the significance of the Antikythera mechanism
- Hans von Euler-Chelpin (1873–1964), co-recipient of 1929 Nobel Prize in Chemistry
- Karl Haberstock (1878–1956), art dealer to the Nazis
- Artur Lauinger (1879–1961), German journalist
- Julius Streicher (1885–1946), prominent Nazi before World War II, founder and publisher of anti-Semitic Der Stürmer newspaper, executed for war crimes
- Julius Schaxel (1887–1943), biologist
- Hans Loritz (1895–1946), Nazi SS concentration camp commandant
- Bertolt Brecht (1898–1956), writer and theater director
- August Schmidhuber (1901–1947), Nazi SS officer, executed for war crimes
- Wilhelm Gerstenmeier (1908–1944), SS concentration camp officer, executed for war crimes
- Josef Priller (1915–1961), Luftwaffe ace
- Wolfgang Lettl (1919-2008), artist
- Mietek Pemper (1920–2011), Polish-born Jew. He compiled and typed Oskar Schindler's list, which saved 1,200 Jewish prisoners from the Holocaust.
- Hildegard Lamfrom (1922–1984), molecular biologist
- Günther Schneider-Siemssen (1926–2015), scenic designer
- Tilo Prückner (1940-2020), Television and Film Actor
- Hans Henning Atrott (1944–2018), German author and theorist
- Wolf Blitzer (born 1948), The American journalist and CNN reporter received June 2024 the lifetime achievement award Augsburger Medienpreis 2024 in the Goldener Saal of the town hall.
- Christian E. Elger (born 1949), neurologist, born in Augsburg
- Francis T. McAndrew (born 1953), American Psychologist, Professor, and Author (U.S. military parents)
- Günther K.H. Zupanc (born 1958), neurobiologist, researcher, university teacher, book author, journal editor, and educational reformer
- Sheryl Lee (born 1967), actress, poet, and activist
- Alexander Wesselsky (born 1968), lead singer of the German band Eisbrecher
- Florian Hecker (born 1975), experimental electronic music composer
- Marisa Olson (born 1977), artist
- Benny Greb (born 1980), solo drum artist
- Andreas Bourani (born 1983), singer-songwriter received June 2016 the award for the best ambassador for Augsburg Augsburger Medienpreis in the Kongress am Park.
- Bianca Voitek (born 1985), female bodybuilder
- Maximilian Hornung (born 1986), cellist
- Javicia Leslie (born 1987), actress

=== Sport ===
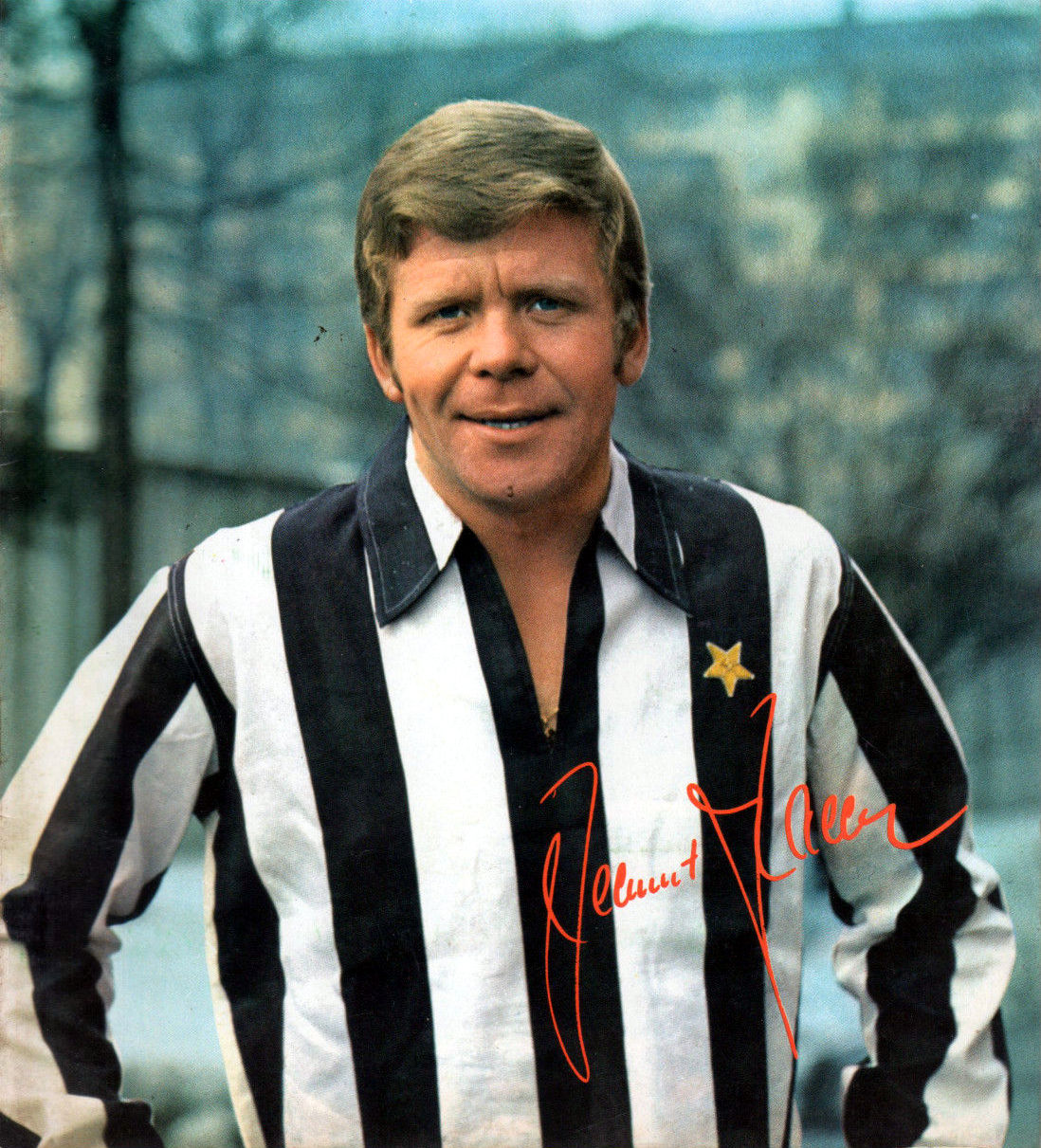
Helmut Haller, 1969

- Werner Haas (1927–1956), Grand Prix motorcycle road racer
- Ulrich Biesinger (1933–2011), former German footballer, part of the team that won the 1954 FIFA World Cup
- Helmut Haller (1939–2012), footballer who represented West Germany at three World Cups
- Bernhard Langer (born 1957), professional golfer
- Bernd Schuster (born 1959), football coach and former player
- Armin Veh (born 1961), football coach
- Alexander Grau (born 1973), racing driver
- Philipp Kohlschreiber (born 1983), former tennis player
- Thomas Holzer (born 1985), racing driver
- Stefan Bradl (born 1989), motorcycle racer
- Johnny Cecotto Jr. (born 1989), racing driver
- Phoenix Sanders (born 1995), American baseball pitcher in the San Francisco Giants organisation
- Nico Sturm (born 1995), ice hockey player
- Georg Zimmermann (born 1997), professional cyclist
- Justin Butler (born 2001), footballer
- Gabriel Vidović (born 2003), footballer
- Marco Brenner (born 2002), professional cyclist

== Sports ==
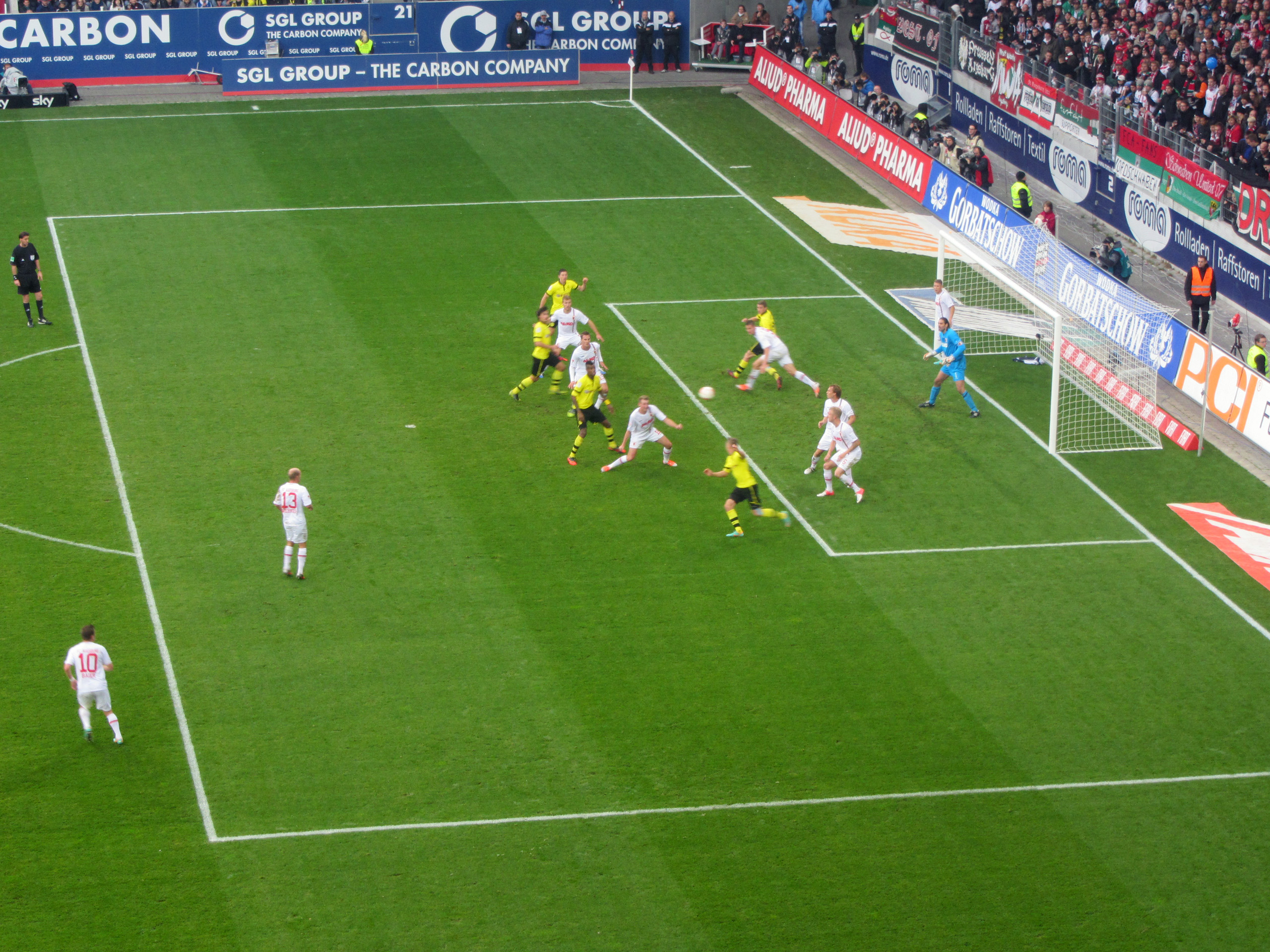
FC Augsburg against Borussia Dortmund in the Bundesliga at the SGL arena in November 2012

FC Augsburg is a football team based in Augsburg and plays in the WWK ARENA to the south of the city centre. FC Augsburg secured promotion to Bundesliga in 2011 and have remained there ever since, qualifying for the Europa League for the first time in 2015 and securing several mid-table finishes. The club, nicknamed the Fuggerstädter or simply as FCA, reached the last 32 in the 2015–16 Europa League before being knocked out after a 1–0 aggregate defeat to Liverpool. The WWK ARENA, nicknamed the "Anfield of the B17 Highway" following the Liverpool UEL match, opened in July 2009 and also hosted games of the 2011 FIFA Women's World Cup. The 30,660 capacity arena is accessible from the city centre or the adjacent B17 dual carriageway.

The city is home to a DEL (first-division) ice hockey team, the Augsburger Panther. The original club, AEV, was formed in 1878, the oldest German ice sport club, and regularly draws around 4,000 spectators. Home games are played at the Curt Frenzel Stadion: an indoor rink and stadium. The club reached the 2018/19 DEL semi finals, eventually losing in the winner-takes-all game 7 to EHC Red Bull München (4–3 series defeat). Consequently, the Panthers qualified for the Champions Hockey League. Augsburg is also home to a German Baseball club, the Augsburg Gators, and 2 American Football Clubs, the Raptors and Augsburg Storm.

For the 1972 Olympic Games in Munich, a protective diversion channel of the Lech dam for river ice was transformed into the world's first artificial whitewater slalom course: the Eiskanal, which remains a world-class competition venue and has served as a prototype for two dozen similar courses abroad.

== Local city nicknames ==
While commonly called Fuggerstadt (Fuggers' city) due to the Fuggers residing there, within Swabia it is also often referred to as Datschiburg: which originated sometime in the 19th century refers to Augsburg's favorite sweet: the Datschi made from fruit, preferably prunes, and thin cake dough. The Datschiburger Kickers charity football team (founded in 1965) reflects this in its choice of team name.

Among younger people, the city is commonly called "Aux" for short.

== See also ==
- Augsburg University, a private Lutheran College in Minneapolis, Minnesota (USA) that takes its name from the Augsburg Confession
- League of Augsburg
- List of civic divisions of Augsburg
- List of mayors of Augsburg
- Synods of Augsburg
