= Augsburg Morellstraße station =

Railway station in Augsburg, Germany

Augsburg Morellstraße
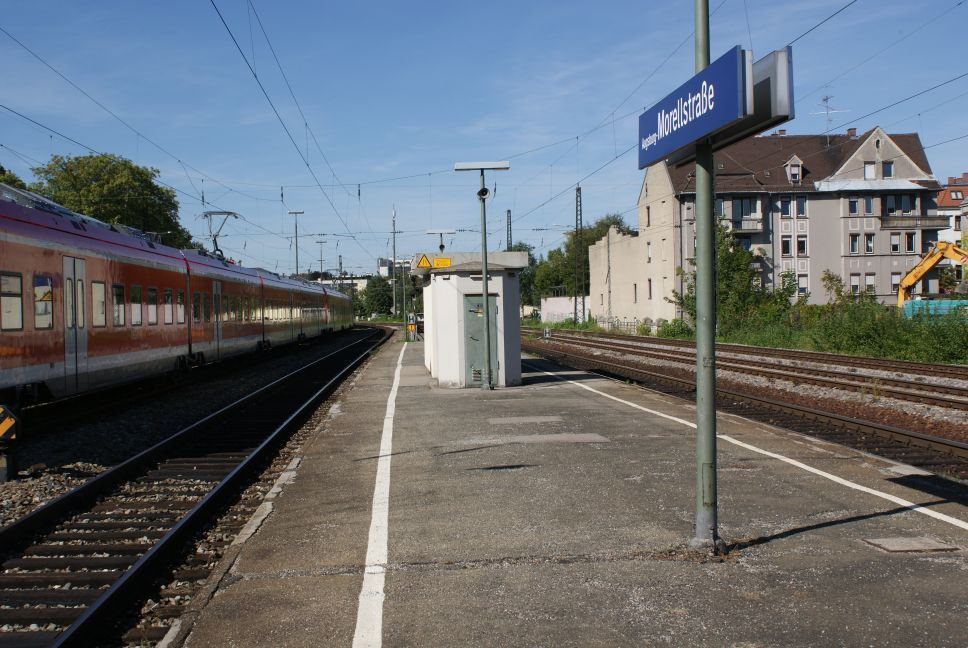
- View of the platform

General information
- Location: Augsburg, Bavaria; Germany
- Coordinates: 48°21′19″N 10°53′35″E
- Owner: Deutsche Bahn
- Operator: DB Netz; DB Station&Service
- Line: Augsburg–Buchloe line
- Platforms: 1 island platform
- Tracks: 2

Construction
- Accessible: No

Other information
- Station code: 222
- DS100 code: MAMS
- IBNR: 8000660
- Category: 6
- Fare zone: : 10
- Website: www.bahnhof.de; stationsdatenbank.de

History
- Opened: 1847

Passengers
- < 1,000 (2006)

Services
Preceding station	DB Regio Bayern	Following station
Augsburg Hbf Terminus	RE 7 Limited service	Augsburg Messe towards Lindau-Reutin
Augsburg Hbf Terminus	RE 17 Limited service	Augsburg Messe towards Oberstdorf
Preceding station		Following station
Augsburg Hbf Terminus	RB 69	Augsburg Messe towards Landsberg (Lech)
Augsburg Hbf Terminus	RB 77	Augsburg Messe towards Füssen
Location
- Location within Bavaria Location within Germany Location within Europe

Augsburg Morellstraße station is a station on the Augsburg–Buchloe railway in the German state of Bavaria. It is located south of the centre of Augsburg on the border of the districts of Antonsviertel and Hochfeld. It is a through station built with eight tracks and one island platform and is classified by Deutsche Bahn as a category 6 station.

== History ==
The station was established in September 1847 with the opening of the Augsburg–Buchloe railway and put into operation under the name of Morellstraße. Augsburg was prefixed to the name on 6 October 1940. After the establishment of the Augsburg Local Railway (Augsburger Localbahn) a branch was built in 1899 from Morellstraße station to Haunstetten in the local industrial area to connect to the companies of Martini & Cie, SWA and Kunstmühle Kühn.

In the Second World War, a major part of the deportations from the Augsburg region to the occupied territories in eastern Europe, including to the Auschwitz concentration camp were conducted from Morellstraße station—only a few transports to Theresienstadt concentration camp ran from Augsburg Central Station (Hauptbahnhof).

=== Infrastructure ===
At the station there are a total of eight through tracks. Between the third and fourth track from the east there is a central platform, which is accessible via an underpass from Von-der-Tann-Strasse. The other tracks at the station were used by the Augsburger Localbahn and the link between the Hauptbahnhof and the locomotive repair shop, which today houses the Augsburg Railway Park museum and is located within walking distance.

The station is not upgraded to be accessible for the disabled. The Bahnhof Augsburg Morellstraße bus stop is in Von-der-Tann-Strasse, but it is served only by rail replacement bus services.

== Services ==
The station is not served by long-distance services. Like other small stations in Augsburg, Morellstraße is especially used for commuting to the city. The station is served by all regional trains from Augsburg Central Station towards Buchloe and in the opposite direction (some trains continue to the Allgäu). Hourly trains also stop here on the way to the Lechfeld Railway to Landsberg (Lech). Within the fare zone of the Augsburger Verkehrsverbund (Augsburg Transport Association, AVV), the regional services run as line R 7 (to Schwabmünchen) and as line R 8 (to Klosterlechfeld). In the peak hour the two services produce a 15-minute interval service. The Morellstraße station is part of the planned Augsburg S-Bahn.

Line	Route	Frequency
RE 71/RE 73	Augsburg – Buchloe – Türkheim (Bay) (split) – Bad Wörishofen / – Mindelheim – Memmingen	between 8 p.m. and 7 a.m
RE 7/RE 17	Augsburg – Buchloe – Biessenhofen – Kempten – Immenstadt – Lindau/Oberstdorf	between 8 p.m. and 7 a.m
RB 77	Augsburg – Buchloe – Kaufbeuren – Biessenhofen – Marktoberdorf – Füssen	Hourly
RB 77	Augsburg – Buchloe (– Kaufbeuren – Biessenhofen – Marktoberdorf)	some trains in the peak
RB 77	Augsburg – Bobingen (– Schwabmünchen – Buchloe)	Hourly
RB 69	Augsburg – Bobingen – Kaufering – Landsberg (Lech)	Hourly
