= Augsburg Messe station =

Railway station in Augsburg, Göggingen

Augsburg Messe
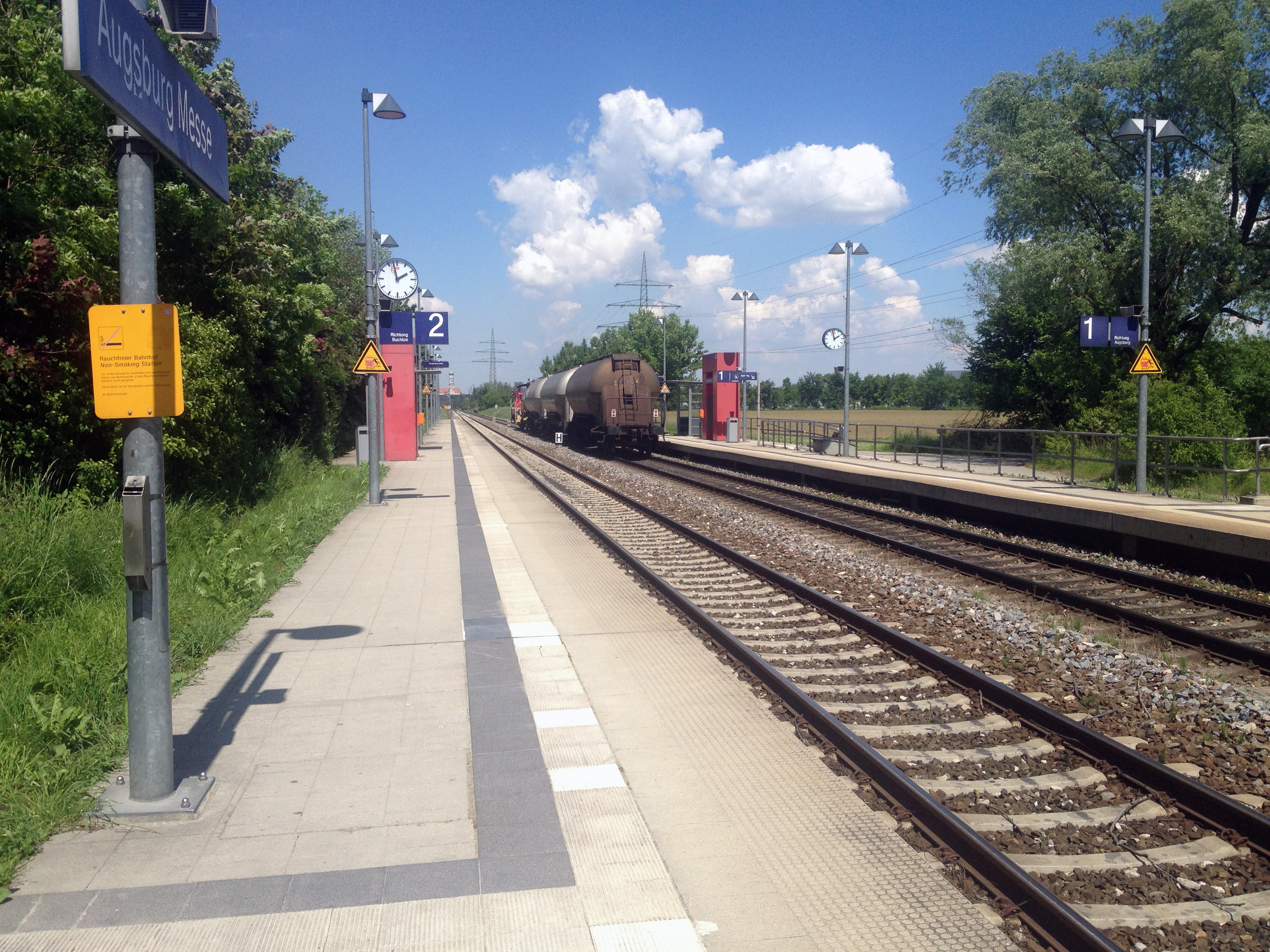
- 2014

General information
- Location: Friedrich-Ebert-Straße 50; 86159 Augsburg-Göggingen; Bavaria; Germany
- Coordinates: 48°20′18.8″N 10°53′09.7″E
- Owner: Deutsche Bahn
- Operator: DB Netz; DB Station&Service
- Lines: Augsburg–Buchloe railway (KBS 971)
- Platforms: 2 side platforms
- Tracks: 2
- Train operators: Bayerische Regiobahn

Other information
- Station code: 7996
- DS100 code: MAGM
- IBNR: 8000659
- Category: 5
- Fare zone: : 20
- Website: www.bahnhof.de

History
- Opened: 2000; 26 years ago

Services
Preceding station	DB Regio Bayern	Following station
Augsburg Morellstraße towards Augsburg Hbf	RE 7 Limited service	Inningen towards Lindau-Reutin
Augsburg Morellstraße towards Augsburg Hbf	RE 17 Limited service	Inningen towards Oberstdorf
Preceding station		Following station
Augsburg Morellstraße towards Augsburg Hbf	RB 69	Inningen towards Landsberg (Lech)
Augsburg Morellstraße towards Augsburg Hbf	RB 77	Inningen towards Füssen
Location

Augsburg Messe station is a railway station in the town of Augsburg, located in Swabia, Bavaria, Germany.

== Operations ==
Line	Route	Frequency	Operator
RE 7	(Donauwörth – Nürnberg –) Augsburg – Augsburg Messe – Buchloe – Kaufbeuren – Kempten (Allgäu) – Immenstadt – Lindau-Insel (– Lindau-Reutin)	Individual services	DB Regio Bayern
RE 17	Allgäu-Franken-Express: (Nürnberg – Donauwörth –) Augsburg – Augsburg Messe – Buchloe – Kaufbeuren – Kempten (Allgäu) – Immenstadt – Sonthofen – Oberstdorf	Individual services	DB Regio Bayern
RB 69	Lechfeld-Bahn: Augsburg – Augsburg Messe – Bobingen – Lagerlechfeld – Kaufering – Landsberg (Lech)	60 min	Bayerische Regiobahn
RB 77	Augsburg– Augsburg Messe – Bobingen – Buchloe – Kaufbeuren – Marktoberdorf – Füssen	60 min	Bayerische Regiobahn
