= Inningen station =

Railway station in Inningen, Germany

Inningen
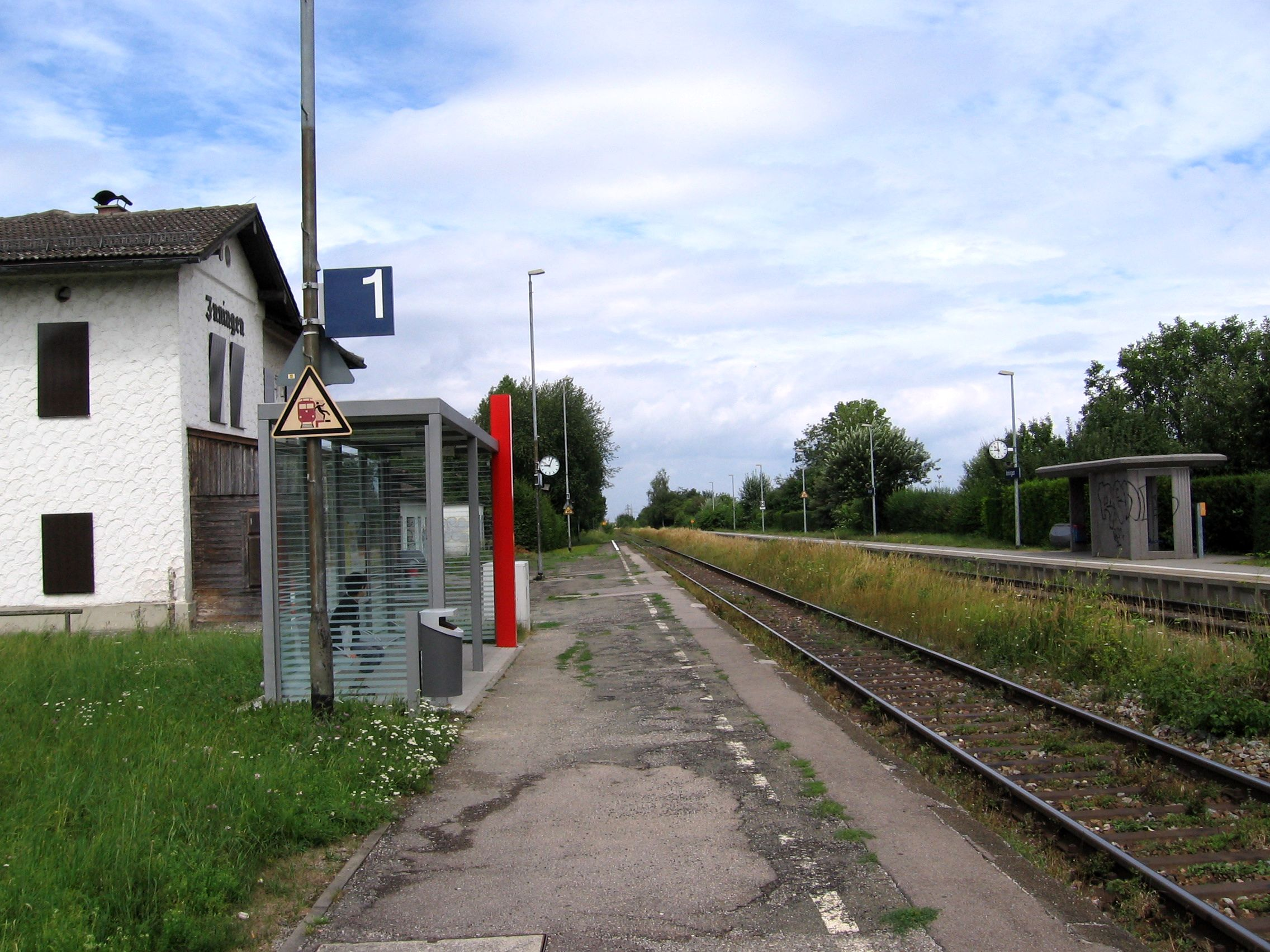
- The station in 2006

General information
- Location: Benediktbeurer Straße 30; 86199 Augsburg-Inningen; Bavaria; Germany
- Coordinates: 48.31141°N 10.86876°E
- System: Hp
- Owner: Deutsche Bahn
- Operator: DB Netz; DB Station&Service
- Lines: Augsburg–Buchloe railway (KBS 971)
- Distance: 6.5 km (4.0 mi) from Augsburg
- Platforms: 2 side platforms
- Tracks: 2
- Train operators: DB Regio Bayern; Bayerische Regiobahn

Other information
- Station code: 2997
- DS100 code: MINI
- IBNR: 08003079
- Category: 6
- Fare zone: : 20
- Website: www.bahnhof.de

Services
Preceding station	DB Regio Bayern	Following station
Augsburg Messe towards Augsburg Hbf	RE 7 Limited service	Bobingen towards Lindau-Reutin
Augsburg Messe towards Augsburg Hbf	RE 17 Limited service	Bobingen towards Oberstdorf
Preceding station		Following station
Augsburg Messe towards Augsburg Hbf	RB 69	Bobingen towards Landsberg (Lech)
Augsburg Messe towards Augsburg Hbf	RB 77	Bobingen towards Füssen
Location

Inningen station (German: Bahnhof Inningen) is a train station in the Augsburg district Inningen, located in Swabia, Bavaria, Germany. It is served by DB Regio Bayern and Bayerische Regiobahn. AVV Bus service is available at the nearby Inningen Ost bus stop. In the 1960s, the station, now mainly used by commuters on local services, was converted into a stop with an alternate siding, the loading track of which was used until the 1990s for loading agricultural products such as sugar beets and for fuel. Today, the station consists of an unoccupied reception building and two outside platforms accessible via a pedestrian underpass.

== Services ==
As of the December 2021 timetable change, the following services stop at Bobingen:

- RE 7/17: limited service between Augsburg and Lindau-Reutin or Oberstdorf.
- RB 69: hourly service between Augsburg and Kaufering; some trains continue from Kaufering to Landsberg (Lech).
- RB 77: hourly service between Augsburg and Füssen.
