= Schwabmünchen station =

Railway station in Bavaria

Schwabmünchen
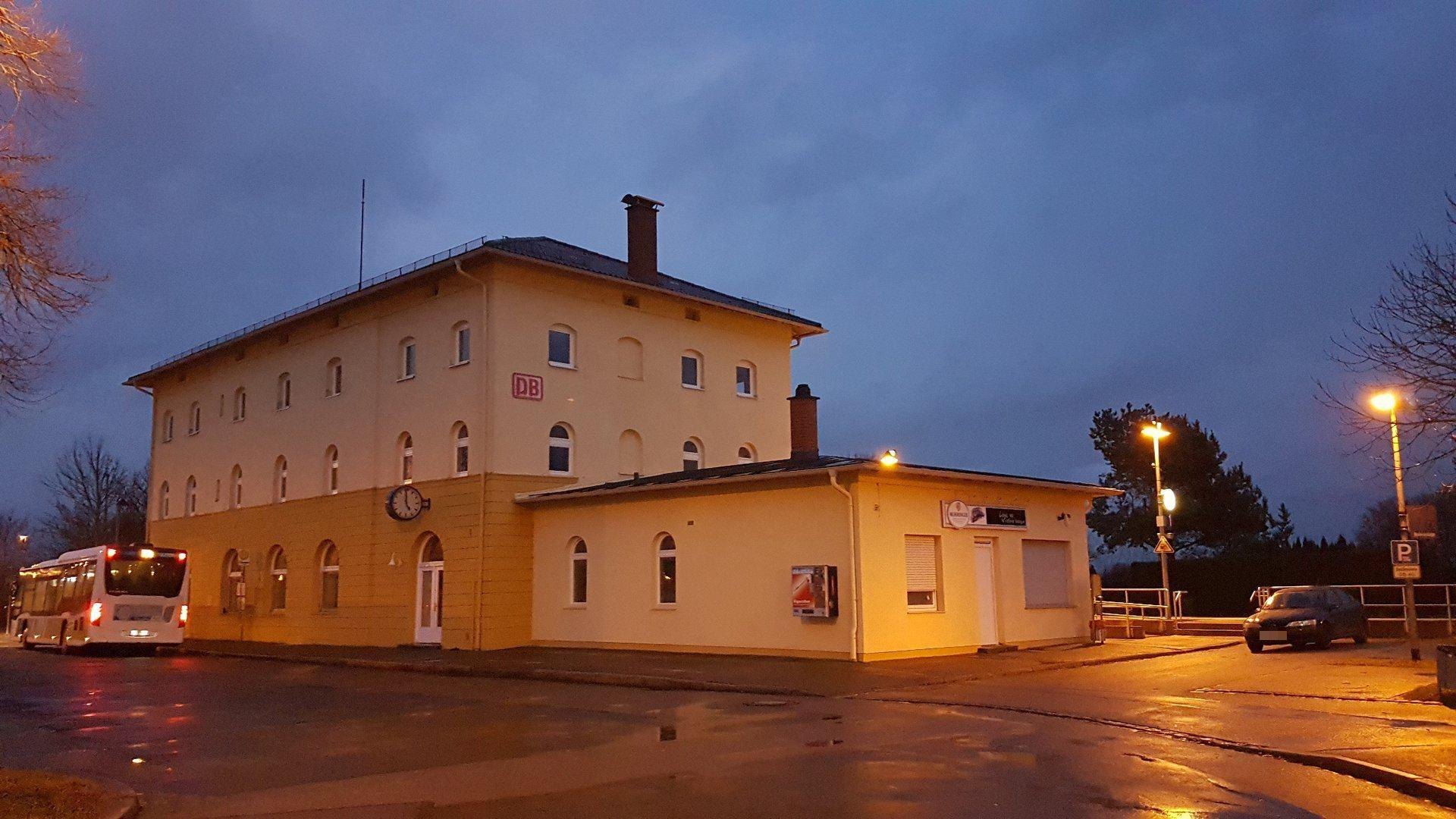
- The station building in 2019

General information
- Location: Schwabmünchen, Bavaria; Germany
- Coordinates: 48°10′43″N 10°46′06″E
- Owner: DB Netz
- Operator: DB Station&Service
- Lines: Augsburg–Buchloe line (KBS 971)
- Distance: 23.1 km (14.4 mi) from Augsburg
- Platforms: 1 island platform; 1 side platform
- Tracks: 3
- Train operators: DB Regio Bayern; Bayerische Regiobahn
- Connections: Augsburger Verkehrs- und Tarifverbund buses

Other information
- Station code: 5702
- DS100 code: MSMN
- IBNR: 8005444
- Category: 5

Services
Preceding station	DB Regio Bayern	Following station
Bobingen towards Augsburg Hbf	RE 7 Limited service	Buchloe towards Lindau-Reutin
Bobingen towards Augsburg Hbf	RE 17 Limited service	Buchloe towards Oberstdorf
Bobingen towards Augsburg Hbf	RE 79	Buchloe towards Kempten (Allgäu) Hbf
Preceding station		Following station
Bobingen towards Augsburg Hbf	RB 77	Buchloe towards Füssen
Location

Schwabmünchen station (German: Bahnhof Schwabmünchen) is a railway station in the municipality of Schwabmünchen, in Bavaria, Germany. It is located the Augsburg–Buchloe of Deutsche Bahn.

== Services ==
As of the December 2021 timetable change, the following services stop at Schwabmünchen:

- RE 79: hourly service between Augsburg and Kempten (Allgäu).
- RE 7/17: limited service between Augsburg and Lindau-Reutin or Oberstdorf.
- RB 77: hourly service between Augsburg and Füssen.
