= Bobingen =

- Town
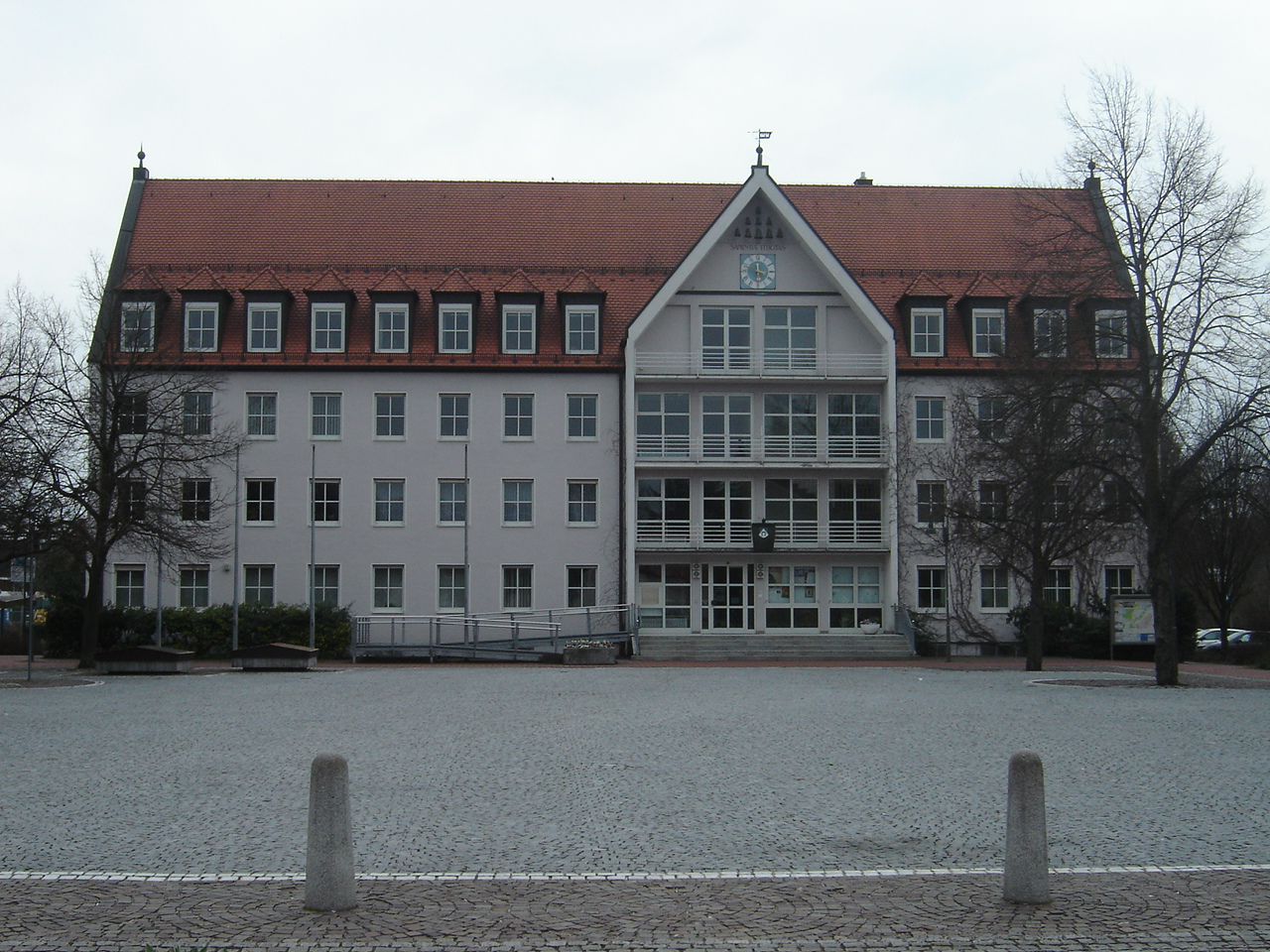
- Town hall

- Coat of arms

- Location of Bobingen within Augsburg district
- Interactive map of Bobingen
- Location within Germany Location within Bavaria
- Coordinates: 48°16′N 10°49′E
- Country: Germany
- State: Bavaria
- Admin. region: Schwaben
- District: Augsburg

Government
  - Mayor (2026–32): Michael Ammer (FBU)

Area
  - Total: 50.25 km^{2} (19.40 sq mi)
- Elevation: 500 m (1,600 ft)

Population (2025-12-31)
  - Total: 18,108
  - Density: 360.4/km^{2} (933.3/sq mi)
- Time zone: UTC+01:00 (CET)
  - Summer (DST): UTC+02:00 (CEST)
- Postal codes: 86399
- Dialling codes: 08234
- Vehicle registration: A
- Website: www.stadt-bobingen.de

Bobingen (German pronunciation: [ˈboːbɪŋən]; Swabian: Boobenge) is a town in Bavaria, Germany. It lies on the rivers Wertach and Singold, on the edge of the Augsburg-Westliche Wälder Nature Park, in Augsburg District, some 13 km south of Augsburg itself.

== History ==
The placename "Bobingen" goes back to the Alamannic settler "Pobo" (ca 506). About 993, Bobingen was called "Pobinga" ("at Pobo's people's house"). Also about 993 came Bobingen's first documentary mention in the Vita S. Udalrici. Bobingen in today's administrative region of Swabia was later an administrative centre of the Augsburg Church Estate. As a result of the Reichsdeputationshauptschluss in 1803, the city came under Bavarian sovereignty. In 1847, the railway arrived, joining Bobingen to Lindau and Hof. In 1899, the rayon factory was founded, starting production in 1902. In 1953, the town was raised to market town, and in 1969 to city. In 1972, the communities of Straßberg, Reinhartshausen and Burgwalden were amalgamated into Bobingen. Bobingen now belongs to the Augsburg district. In 1975, the communities of Waldberg and Kreuzanger were also amalgamated into Bobingen. In 1993, the city hall (Singoldhalle) was completed. In 1994, the city held a thousandth-anniversary celebration, as well as celebrating 25 years as a city. In 2004, the city saw the completion of the rehabilitation and expansion of the city hospital. In 2005, the city's buildings underwent beautification.

=== The Bobingen "Büble" Legend ===
There is more than one version of the story about the Bobingen Büble ("lad" or "young man"). In a second, later version, the story even ends with the characters' arrest and execution. This, however, cannot be true from an historical point of view, as there were no gallows in Bobingen, and therefore no hangings could be carried out. The Church Estate's High Justice establishment had its execution place at Schwabmünchen.

The following legend is the earliest version, drawn from Alexander Schöppner's "Bayerische Sagen" (Bavarian Legends):

Three hours south of Augsburg on the so-called Hochstraße (a "high road", built on embankments or viaducts), lies the great and beautiful village of Bobingen. There, however, it is not good to ask "Wo geht's Bobingen zu?" ("How does one get to Bobingen"), and quite a few have ended up with bloody heads from it. At the least one will be mauled with insult and scoffing, and with blasphemous talk, whomever one wishes to ask. This came about as follows: Once, a long time ago, there was a young man from Bobingen who was prosecuted before a court. The accused appealed to a lawyer with a good name in Augsburg to fight his case for him. He advised the young man to behave like an idiot before the court, to answer every question asked of him by saying "Bobingen zu" (which is rather nonsensical), at the same time pointing with his right hand under his nose from right to left. He did just as he was advised, and since neither a confession nor anything else could be got out of him, the court released him. After a time, he came to the town on business and met the lawyer, who was curious to know the case's outcome. After hearing of the fortunate success, he said "It is now time for you to pay me for this advice; I demand two Karolins for my troubles."

The young man, however, replied with a "Bobingen zu", turned round the street corner and since that time has left the lawyer waiting for his fee.

== Constituent communities ==
- Kernstadt with Bobingen-Siedlung (pop. 14,403)
- Stadtteil Straßberg (pop. 1,142)
- Burgwalden (pop. 80)
- Reinhartshausen (pop. 571)
- Waldberg (pop. 424)
- Kreuzanger (pop. 167)

== Politics ==
The mayor has been, since May 2020, Klaus Förster (CSU).

Places on the 25-seat city council are apportioned as follows (as of municipal elections in 2014):

- SPD: 10 seats
- CSU: 9 seats
- "Free Voters" (non-aligned citizens' group): 2 seat
- Free Citizens' Union: 2 seat
- Greens: 2 seat

=== Coat of arms ===
Arms description: Azure a peak argent, therein a horseshoe sable.

Arms history: The meaning of the horseshoe in the municipal coat of arms is not entirely clear. The horseshoe could to some be a reminder of a once intensive horse raising industry in the town. Others see in it a reference to finding horseshoes – which happens often around Bobingen – which are called "Ungarneisen" ("Hungary irons"). They supposedly date from the Battle of Lechfeld (10 August 955) in which the Hungarians were defeated. A seal from the time around 1815 with a horseshoe in the shield has its roots in a local emblem that places along the so-called Hochstraße, following then Prince-Bishop Clemens Wenzeslaus von Sachsen's (1739–1812) wishes, assumed for marking border stones, border posts, and even posts around pastures. After the national emblem was bestowed by King Ludwig I of Bavaria in 1837, the municipal arms bore the Bavarian national colours overlaid with the black horseshoe.

=== City partnership ===
Since 1969, there has been a city partnership with the French town of Aniche.

== Education ==
=== Schools ===
- Staatl. Realschule
- Dr. Jaufmann Hauptschule
- Laurentius Grundschule (primary school)
- Freie Aktive Schule
- Grundschule Bobingen an der Singold (primary)
- Krankenpflegeschule im Städt. Krankenhaus (nursing school)

== Hospital ==
The hospital of Bobingen is located at the Wertachstraße 55, next to the river Wertach. The formerly municipal hospital belongs since 2006, together with the hospital of Schwabmünchen, to the Komunalunternehmen (city owned company) Wertachkliniken (wertach hospitals), owned by the cities Bobingen and Schwabmünchen. The official name is Wertachklinik (Wertach Hospital) Bobingen. The Wertachklinik Bobingen provides the main departments anaesthesiology, trauma and reconstructive surgery and internal medicine and the departments gynaecology and midwifery, ENT and plastic surgery with attending doctors. All departments together provide 130 beds. The first hospital in Bobingen was founded in 1858.

== Public safety ==
- Police

The police station of Bobingen is located at the Hochstraße (high street) 22 in Bobingen. The space of responsibility is the town of Bobingen, the town of Königsbrunn, Oberottmarshausen and Wehringen.

- Rescue service

Since May 2022, the rescue station of the Bavarian Red Cross is located directly at the hospital of Bobingen. Here, a rescue ambulance and a patient transport ambulance are stationed. There is no fixed area of responsibility for the rescue service. The Public-safety answering point (PSAP) of Augsburg is responsible for alerting the rescue service. The PSAP is always alerting the closest rescue vehicle to an emergency. Administrative borders like counties etc. do not matter here. The area of operation is about the south of Augsburg County and the town of Augsburg itself.

- Fire brigade

The fire station of the volunteer fire brigade of Bobingen is located at Michael-Schäffer-Straße 12 in Bobingen. Here a Löschzug (platoon for fire fighting) and a Rüstzug (platoon for technical relief, e.g. traffic collisions) are stationed. The PSAP of Augsburg is responsible for alerting the fire brigade, also. Therefore, there is no fixed area of responsibility for the fire brigade. The area of operation is about the town of Bobingen itself and the district Siedlung and for support all other districts of Bobingen and the town of Königsbrunn, Oberottmarshausen, Wehringen und Großaitingen. The volunteer fire brigade of Bobingen was founded in 1871. The fire brigade is alarmed about 170 times per year.

The districts Straßberg, Reinhartshausen and Waldberg/Kreuzanger do have independent fire brigades with one small fire truck, each.

== Culture and sightseeing ==
=== Places of worship ===
- St. Wolfgang- und Wendelin-Kapelle (chapel)
- St. Felizitas
- Rokoko-Wallfahrtskirche Mariae Himmelfahrt (Rococo Pilgrimage Church)
- Mosque

=== Other sights ===
- Late mediaeval wayside atonement cross
- Lower Schlößchen (small palace)
- Middle mill
- Middle Schlößchen
- Holy cross Schlößchen
- Upper mill
- Brewery and former inn
- Cosimosinisches Schlößchen
- Upper Schlößchen
- Milestone from historic Roman road
- Stauden-Haus
- Singoldhalle (City hall)
- Bobinger Büble (a sculpture relating to the story above)
- Westliche Wälder Nature Park
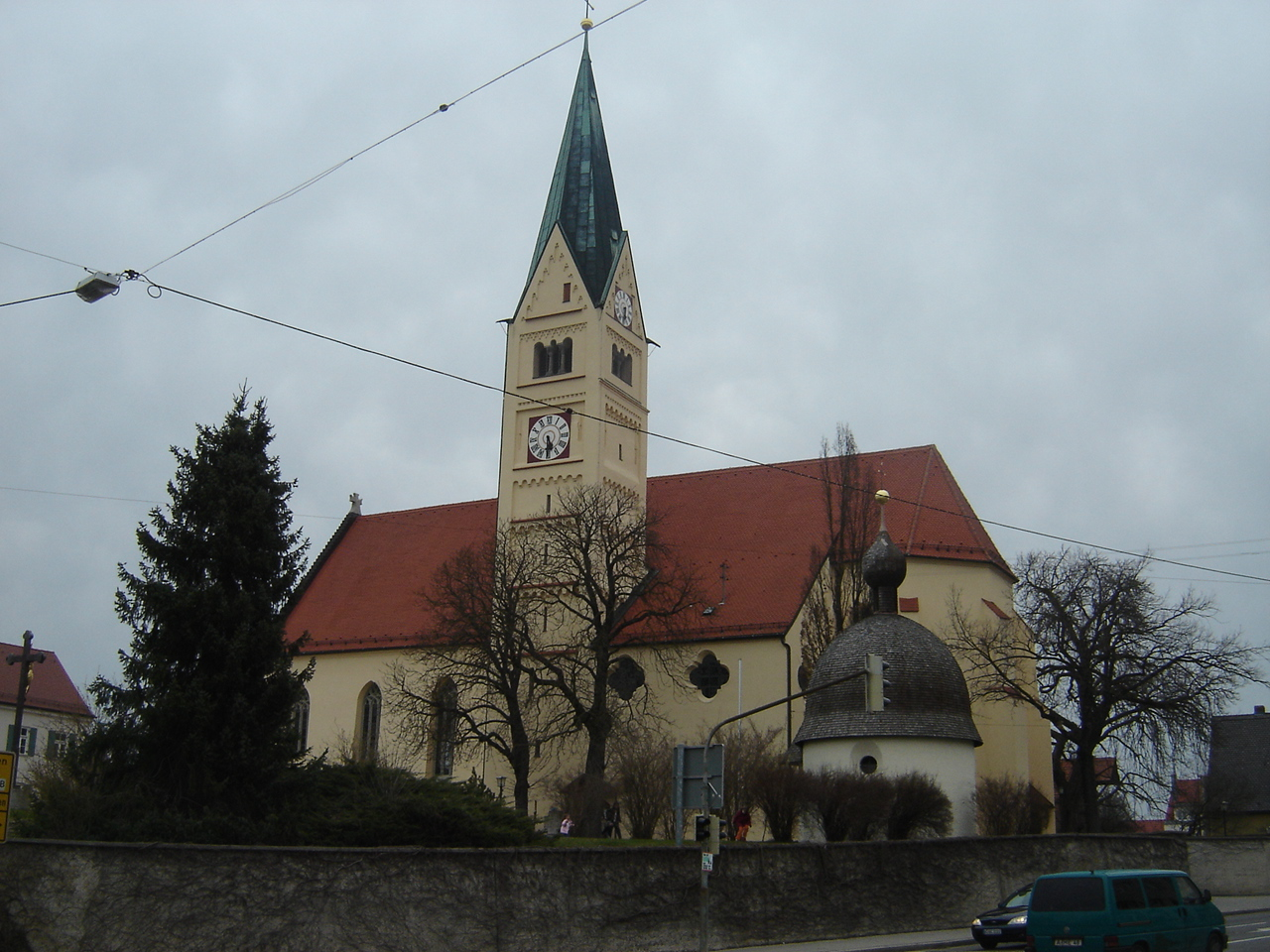
St.Felizitas Church

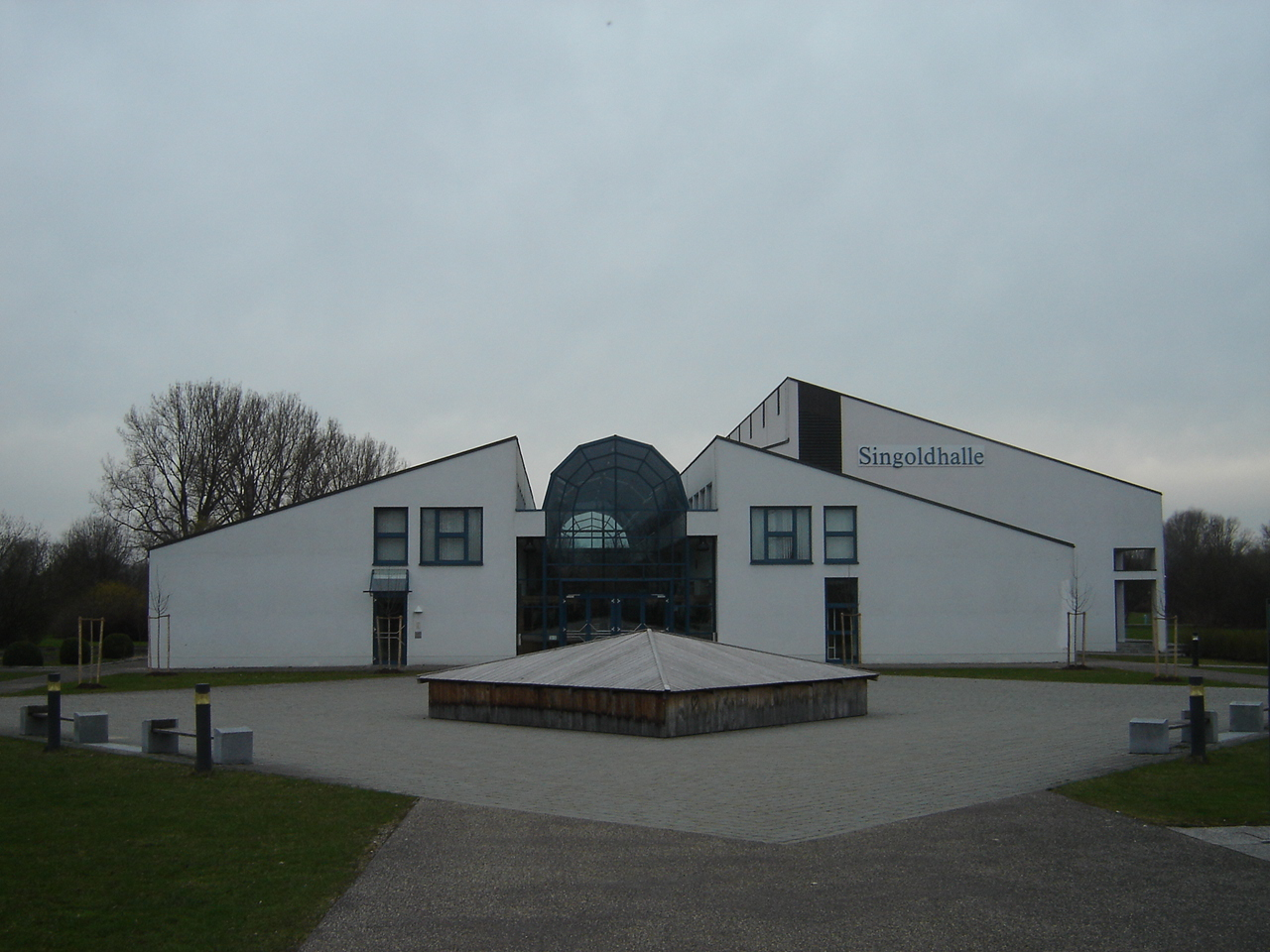
Singoldhalle (City hall)

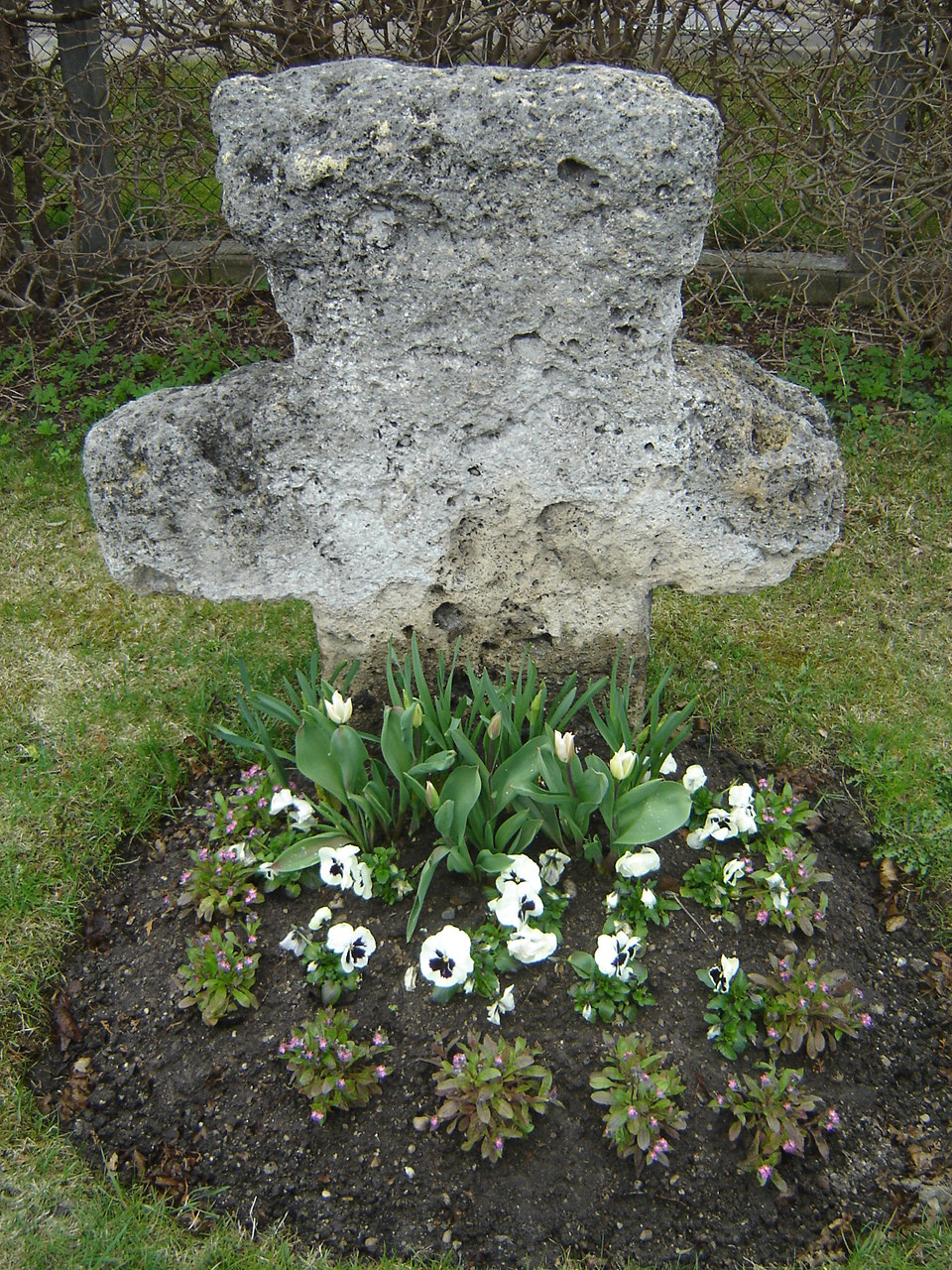
Late mediaeval wayside atonement cross

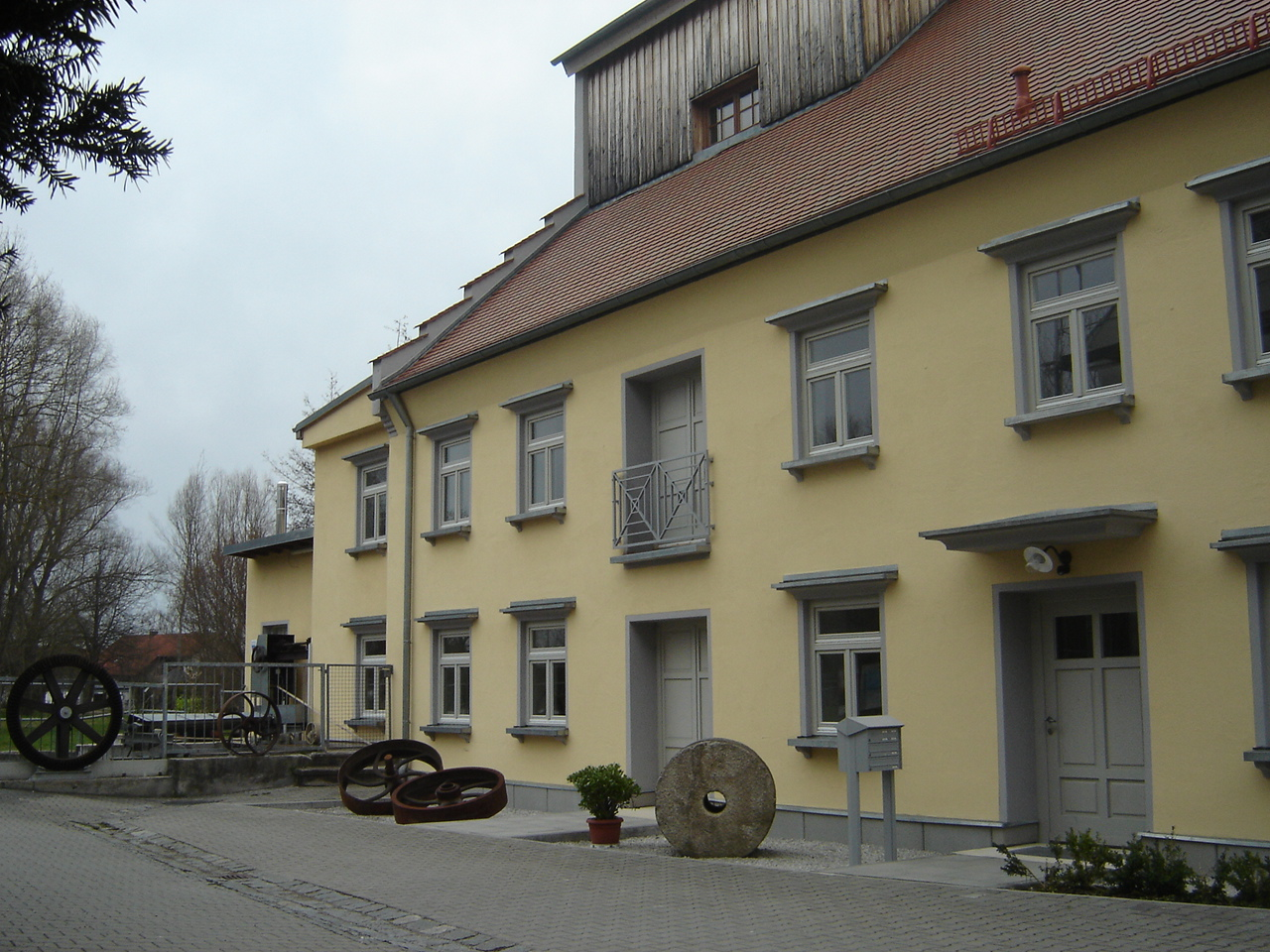
Middle mill

== Transport ==
- Autobahn A 8 passes a few kilometres north of Augsburg.
- Bundesstraße (Federal highway) 17B east of Bobingen, B 300 north of Bobingen.
- Bobingen station is located on the Augsburg–Buchloe and Bobingen–Landsberg am Lech lines.

== Personalities ==
- Roy Black (1943–1991), was a German hit singer and actor in many German musical films
- Marco Holzer (born 1988), son of Günther Holzer and cousin of Thomas Holzer, racing driver and winner of the 2005 Formula BMW World Final
- Andreas Farny (born 1992), ice hockey player
