= Bobingen station =

Railway station in Bavaria

Bobingen
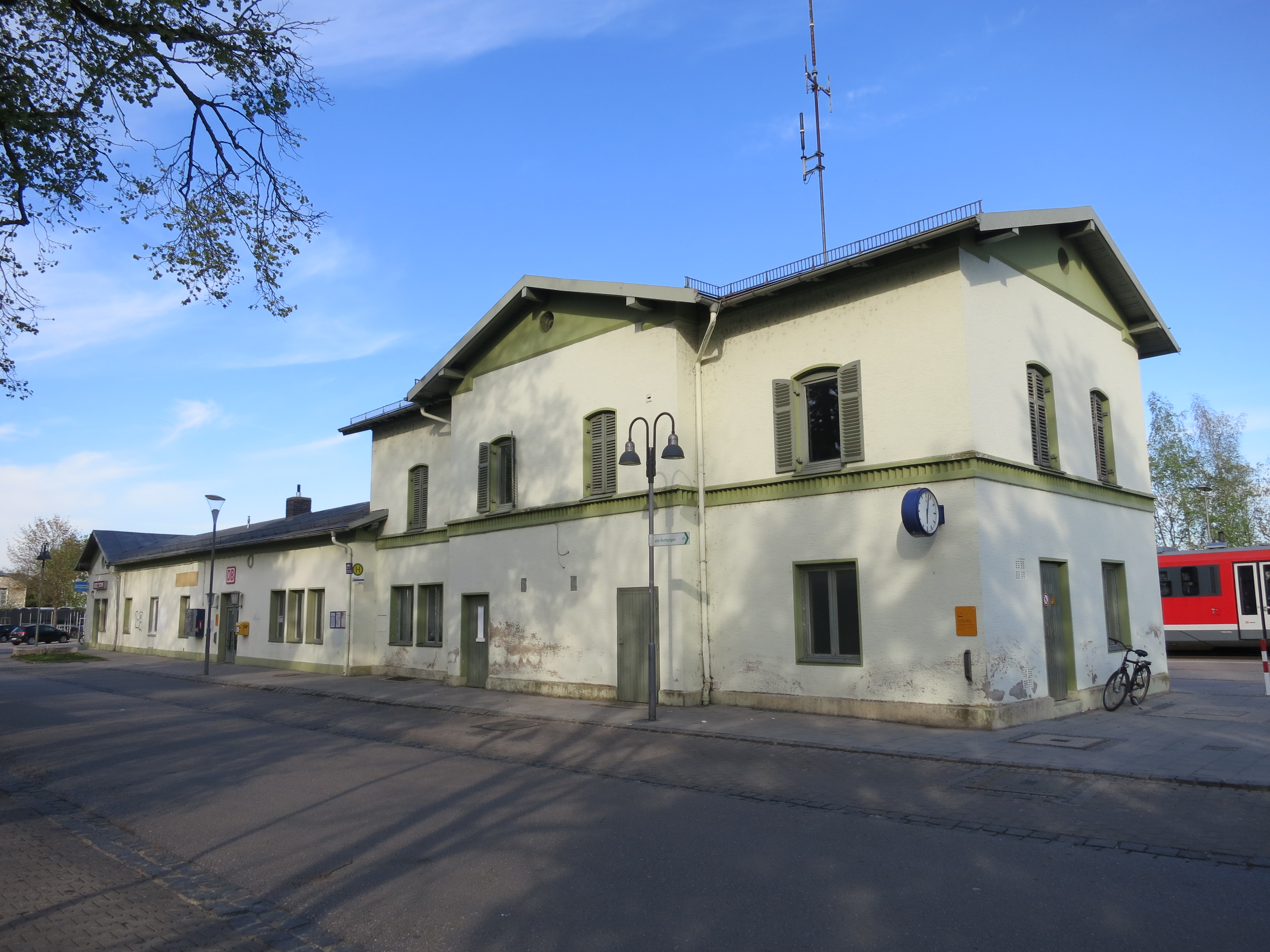
- The station building in 2014

General information
- Location: Bobingen, Bavaria; Germany
- Coordinates: 48°15′59″N 10°50′16″E
- Owner: DB Netz
- Operator: DB Station&Service
- Lines: Augsburg–Buchloe line (KBS 971); Bobingen–Landsberg am Lech line (KBS 986)
- Distance: 12.0 km (7.5 mi) from Augsburg
- Platforms: 1 island platform; 2 side platforms
- Tracks: 4
- Train operators: DB Regio Bayern; Bayerische Regiobahn
- Connections: Augsburger Verkehrs- und Tarifverbund buses

Other information
- Station code: 717
- DS100 code: MBOB
- IBNR: 8001033
- Category: 4

Services
Preceding station	DB Regio Bayern	Following station
Inningen towards Augsburg Hbf	RE 7 Limited service	Schwabmünchen towards Lindau-Reutin
Inningen towards Augsburg Hbf	RE 17 Limited service	Schwabmünchen towards Oberstdorf
Augsburg Hbf Terminus	RE 79	Schwabmünchen towards Kempten (Allgäu) Hbf
Preceding station		Following station
Inningen towards Augsburg Hbf	RB 69	Oberottmarshausen towards Landsberg (Lech)
Inningen towards Augsburg Hbf	RB 77	Schwabmünchen towards Füssen
Location

Bobingen station (German: Bahnhof Bobingen) is a railway station in the municipality of Bobingen, in Bavaria, Germany. It is located at the junction of the Augsburg–Buchloe and Bobingen–Landsberg am Lech line of Deutsche Bahn.

== Services ==
As of the December 2021 timetable change, the following services stop at Bobingen:

- RE 79: hourly service between Augsburg and Kempten (Allgäu).
- RE 7/17: limited service between Augsburg and Lindau-Reutin or Oberstdorf.
- RB 69: hourly service between Augsburg and Kaufering; some trains continue from Kaufering to Landsberg (Lech).
- RB 77: hourly service between Augsburg and Füssen.
