= Farny =

Farny is a surname. Notable people with the surname include:

- Andreas Farny (born 1992), German ice hockey player
- Arnold Droz-Farny (1856–1912), Swiss mathematician
- Henry Farny (1847–1916), American painter and illustrator

== See also ==
- Fanny (name)
