= Peter Seitz =

German graphic designer

- Born: 1931; Schwabmünchen, Germany
- Died: September 21, 2023 (aged 91–92)
- Occupations: Graphic designer, author, teacher, business owner

Peter Seitz (1931–2023) was a graphic designer, author, teacher and business owner who served as the first design director at The Walker Art Center (Minneapolis, MN), and helped establish the graphic design program at the Minneapolis College of Art and Design.

== Early career and education ==
Born in Schwabmünchen, Germany in 1931, Seitz graduated from Hochschule für Gestaltung Ulm (Ulm School of Design) with a diploma in Visual Communication in 1959, after studying with Tomás Maldonado, Max Bill, and Otl Aicher. He then received a Master of Fine Arts (MFA) in Graphic Design and Photography from Yale University in 1961, studying with Paul Rand, Bradbury Thompson and Herbert Matter.

After Yale, Seitz was hired by the architectural firm, I.M. Pei & Associates. In 1964, Walker Art Center director Martin Friedman appoints Seitz design curator and editor of the Design Quarterly, a national publication of applied arts, architecture, and design.

In 1968, opened his first graphic design firm, Visual Communication, Inc., as a solo practitioner. Seitz went on to organize the Minnesota Chapter of AIGA, and Siggraph. In 1970, Seitz joined Dewey Thorbeck and Al French (architecture), Roger Martin (landscape architecture), and Steve Kahne (computer specialist) in launching InterDesign, the Twin Cities’ first interdisciplinary design firm. Major InterDesign projects include: the identity programs and signage systems for the Minneapolis Parkways, the downtown St. Paul Skyways, the Minnesota State Capitol and the Minnesota Zoo.

In 1971, Seitz began teaching graphic design classes part-time at the Minneapolis College of Art and Design. He served as Chair of the Design Department from 1977 to 1978, and as Acting Chair of Design from 1998 to 1999. Seitz assembled one of the first computer graphics laboratories at MCAD in 1981. Seitz retired and became MCAD professor emeritus in 2002. His life and work is chronicled in "Peter Seitz: Designing A Life".

== Selected honors and awards ==
- American Institute of Graphic Arts, Fellow, AIGA Minnesota Chapter
- Graphis Annual
- Society of Environmental Graphic Designers
- Society of Publication Designers
- Society of Typographic Arts
