= Augsburg–Buchloe railway =

Railway line in Bavaria, Germany

Augsburg–Buchloe
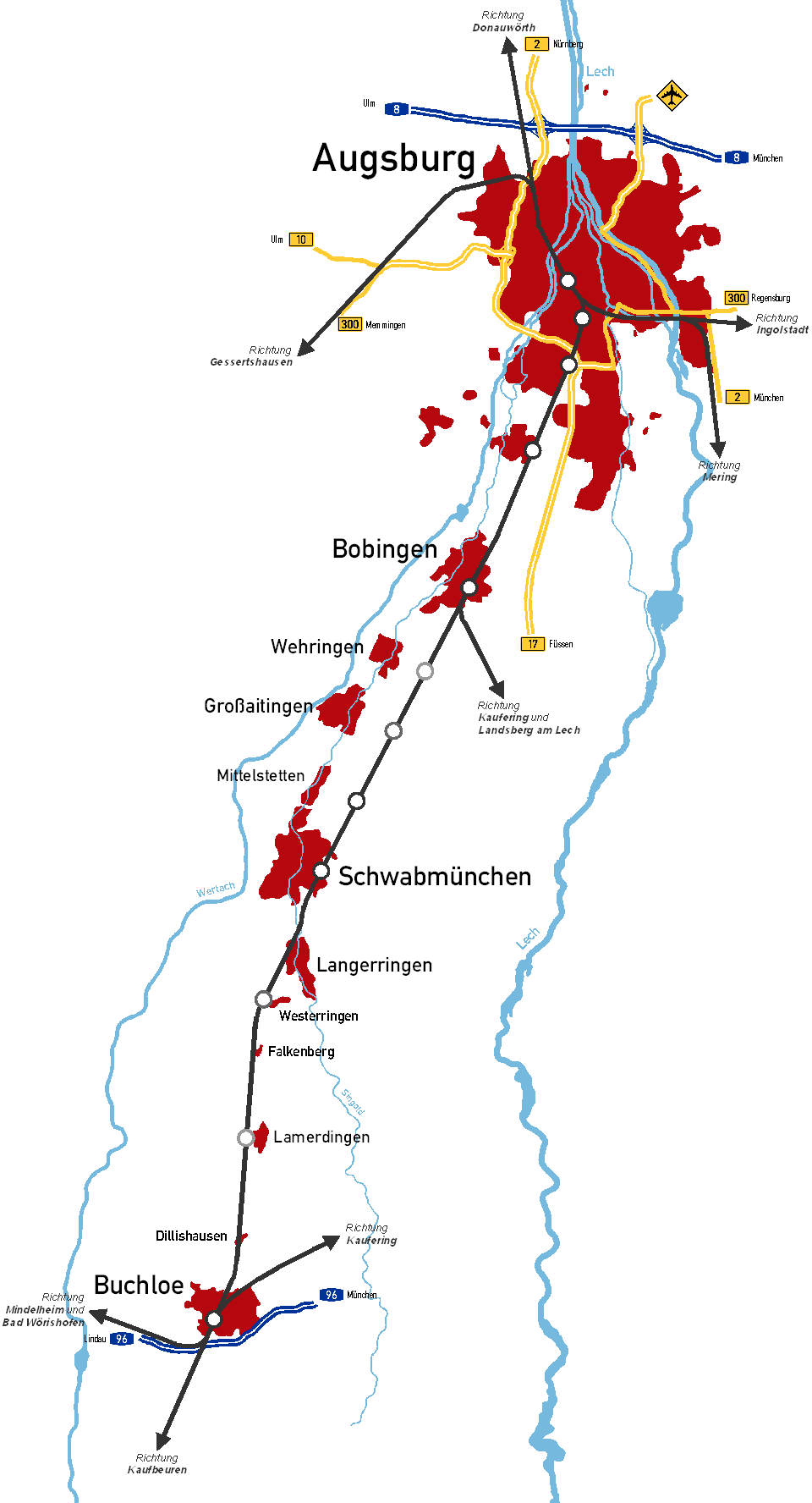

Overview
- Owner: DB Netz
- Line number: 5304
- Locale: Bavaria, Germany

Service
- Route number: 971

Technical
- Line length: 39.895 km (24.790 mi)
- Track gauge: 1,435 mm (4 ft 8 1/2 in) standard gauge

The Augsburg–Buchloe railway is a double-track main line in the German state of Bavaria. It runs from Augsburg to Buchloe. Other major towns on the route are Bobingen and Schwabmünchen. It was built as part of the Ludwig South-North Railway, one of the oldest lines in Germany.

== History ==
The route was created as part of the Ludwig South-North Railway from Lindau via Kempten, Augsburg and Nuremberg to Hof. The construction of the 60.2 km long line from Augsburg Hauptbahnhof via Bobingen and Buchloe to Kaufbeuren was authorised by a Bavarian law of 25 August 1843 and opened on 1 September 1847. The 20.3 km long section from Buchloe to Kaufbeuren is now considered part of the Buchloe–Lindau railway.

== Operations ==
Under the 2022 timetable passenger services operate on line on the following routes:

Line	Route	Frequency
ICE 18	Hamburg-Altona – Augsburg – Buchloe – Kempten – Oberstdorf	Some trains
RE 7 RE 17	(Nuremberg) – Augsburg – Buchloe – Kaufbeuren – Kempten (Allgäu) – Immenstadt (split) – – Lindau-Reutin (RE 7) / – Oberstdorf (RE 17)	Every 2 hours, Nuremberg–Augsburg twice a day
RE 71 RE 73	Augsburg – Buchloe – Türkheim (Bay) (split) – – Mindelheim – Memmingen (RE 71) / – Bad Wörishofen (RE 73)	Every 2 hours
RB 69	Augsburg – Bobingen – Kaufering (– Landsberg (Lech))	Hourly
RB 77	Augsburg – Bobingen	Mon–Fri half-hourly, Sat+Sun hourly
RB 77	(...) – Schwabmünchen – Buchloe – Kaufbeuren – Biessenhofen – Marktoberdorf – Füssen	Hourly, extra trains in the peak

A daily Intercity train also operates between Augsburg and Oberstdorf.

There are additional trains between Augsburg and Schwabmünchen and between Augsburg and Buchloe, creating a half-hourly service between Augsburg and Buchloe.

The Allgäu-Franken-Express operated from the timetable change in December 2006 to replace some ICE trains, which since then have run on the Nuremberg–Ingolstadt–Munich route instead of the Nuremberg–Augsburg route. There are operated 2 pairs of trains daily, now as the RE 7/RE 17.
