= Schwabmünchen =

- Town
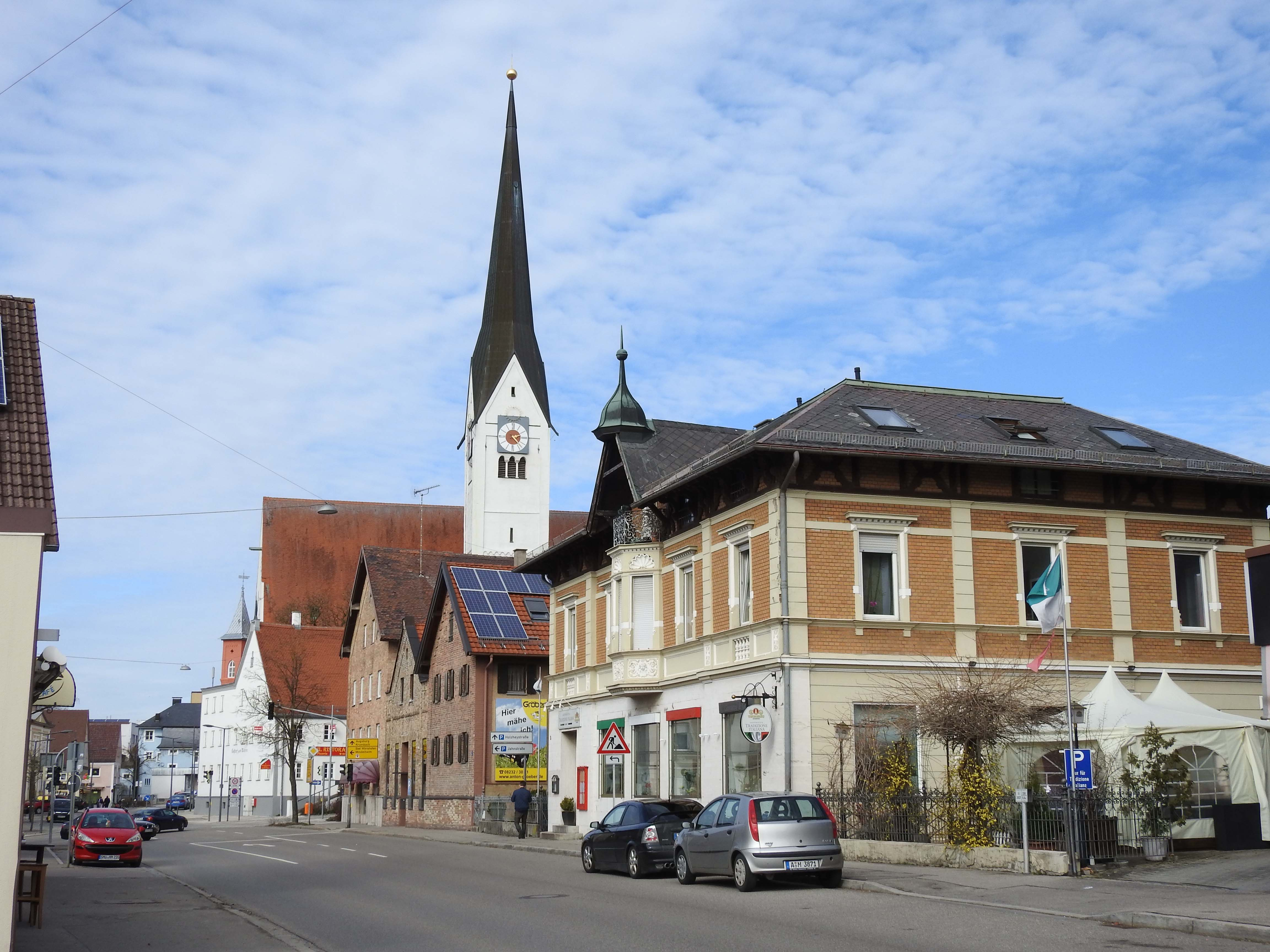
- Town center with the Church of Saint Michael

- Coat of arms

- Location of Schwabmünchen within Augsburg district
- Interactive map of Schwabmünchen
- Location within Germany Location within Bavaria
- Coordinates: 48°10′44″N 10°45′18″E
- Country: Germany
- State: Bavaria
- Admin. region: Schwaben
- District: Augsburg

Government
  - Mayor (2020–26): Lorenz Müller (CSU)

Area
  - Total: 55.5 km^{2} (21.4 sq mi)
- Elevation: 558 m (1,831 ft)

Population (2025-12-31)
  - Total: 15,512
  - Density: 279/km^{2} (724/sq mi)
- Time zone: UTC+01:00 (CET)
  - Summer (DST): UTC+02:00 (CEST)
- Postal codes: 86826–86830
- Dialling codes: 08232, 08204
- Vehicle registration: A
- Website: www.schwabmuenchen.de

Schwabmünchen (German pronunciation: [ʃvaːpˈmʏnçn̩]; Swabian: Mingkchinga) is a town in Bavaria, Germany in the administrative region of Swabia south of Augsburg in the Augsburg district.

== Geography ==
=== Location ===
Schwabmünchen lies about 20 km south of Augsburg between Lech and Wertach on the western edge of the Lechfeld, a gravel plain. Through the city flows the river Singold. In the west, about 5 km from town in the residential area of Stauden rise the Westliche Wälder, or Western Forests.

=== Neighbouring communities ===
North of Schwabmünchen, about 3 km away, lies Großaitingen. Furthermore, Schwabmünchen is surrounded by Untermeitingen to the southeast, Langerringen to the south and Hiltenfingen to the southwest, as well as, about 10 km away in the Stauden – an area of gentle wooded hills and cultivated dales – Mickhausen to the northwest.

== City divisions ==
In 1978, as a result of Bavarian municipal reform, the following communities were amalgamated into Schwabmünchen:

- Birkach, with a population today of 186, was mentioned in a document as early as 969 under the name "Pirichah" as a domain of Saint Stephen's Convent ("Kloster St. Stephan") in Augsburg. It lies about 7 km from Schwabmünchen in the Schwarzachtal (valley).
- Klimmach, with a population today of 255 already existed in the early Middle Ages, but was only first mentioned in a document in 1482. Klimmach is an important pilgrimage place in the Bishopric of Augsburg. Klimmach lies about 6 km west from Schwabmünchen on the heights between the Wertach Plain ("Wertachebene") and the Schwarzachtal.
- Mittelstetten with 571 inhabitants.
- Schwabegg, which today has 781 inhabitants, had its first documentary mention in 1110. It lies about 5 km west of Schwabmünchen at the edge of the rise towards the Stauden area and the Wertach Plain.

== History ==
Schwabmünchen was first mentioned in writing in 954 as "castellum Mantahinga" in a biography of Saint Ulrich, Bishop of Augsburg. From archaeological digs in the north of the modern city have come clues of Celtic, Roman and Alamannic peoples dwelling in the area in bygone ages. In 1562, Holy Roman Emperor Ferdinand I raised the community to market town and bestowed upon it a market town's coat of arms. In the years from 1804 to 1806, Schwabmünchen came under Bavarian rule, having formerly belonged to the Prince-Bishopric of Augsburg (Augsburger Hochstift).

On 4 March 1945, late in the Second World War, Schwabmünchen was beset by a heavy air raid, which killed 60 inhabitants. One fourth of the town was utterly destroyed, and two thirds of it was heavily damaged.

After the war, the population rose dramatically owing to the great number of refugees flowing into the town, and in 1953, Schwabmünchen was raised from market town to city. In 1972, the former district of Schwabmünchen was merged with the district of Wertingen to form the current district of Augsburg.

=== Population growth ===
1840: 3,438 inhabitants
1900: 4,751
1939: 5,453
1970: 9,200
2005: 13,806

== Politics ==
Distribution of places on the 24-seat city council (as of municipal elections in 2008) is as follows:

- CSU: 13 seats
- SPD: 4 seats
- Freie Wählervereinigung (citizens' coalition): 7 seats

Since 2008, Lorenz Müller (CSU) has been mayor of Schwabmünchen.

=== City partnership ===
Since 7 June 1975, there has been a city partnership between Schwabmünchen and the city of Giromagny in France. Giromagny lies 12 km north of Belfort at the foot of the Vosges mountains.

== Culture and sightseeing ==
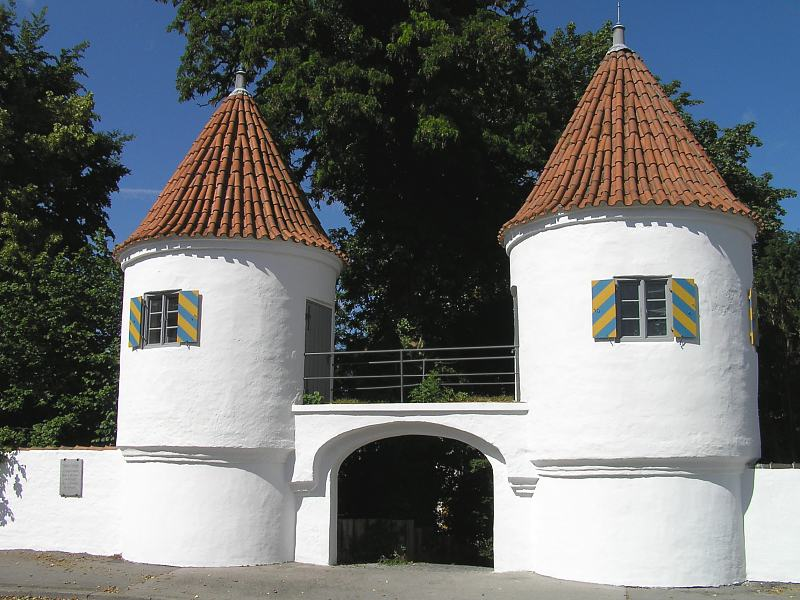
Hexentürmchen ("Witches' turrets") at the city hall

Worth seeing is one of Schwabmünchen's landmarks, the Hexentürmchen, or Witches' turrets, flanking a gateway at the city hall that once led into the episcopal Straßvogtei, or "road bailiwick", the name given the area for the important ancient road that led through it. The turrets were apparently built in the 16th century.

Another thing to see is the Strickerbrunnen, or "Knitter Fountain", at Schrannenplatz. It was created by sculptor Karl-Ulrich Nuss. To the right and the left, underneath the knitter stand a lamb and a goat. According to one story, if two people sit on these animals at the same time, they will be lifelong friends.

Every year on the last weekend of September, the local fair Michaelimarkt takes place.

== Economy and infrastructure ==
=== Transport ===
Schwabmünchen is the terminal stop on the Augsburger Verkehrsverbund, the Augsburg area's transport system. Trains run half-hourly from Schwabmünchen to Buchloe and Augsburg on the Augsburg–Buchloe railway.

Through ringroads and feeder roads, the town is connected with Bundesstraße (Federal Highway) 17 which leads to Augsburg and Landsberg am Lech, and which is built quite similarly to an Autobahn.

=== Established enterprises ===
- Schöffel Sportbekleidung GmbH (sportswear)
- Osram wire and chemical works
- Kalenderwerk Zettler
- Eberle spring factory
- CTP GmbH

== Public safety ==
=== Police ===
The police station of Schwabmünchen is located at the Fuggerstraße 64 in Schwabmünchen. The area of responsibility is the town of Schwabmünchen itself and the towns Graben, Großaitingen, Hiltenfingen, Kleinaitingen, Klosterlechfeld, Langenneufnach, Langerringen, Mickhausen, Mittelneufnach, Scherstetten, Schwabmünchen, Untermeitingen and Walkertshofen.

=== Rescue service ===
The rescue station of the Bavarian Red Cross is located at the Fuggerstraße 42 in Schwabmünchen. Here an emergency physician vehicle, a rescue ambulance and a patient transport ambulance are stationed. There is no fixed area of responsibility for the rescue service. The pupblic-safety answering point (PSAP) of Augsburg is responsible for alerting the rescue service. The PSAP is always alerting the closest rescue vehicle to an emergency. Administrative borders like counties etc. do not matter here. The area of operation is about the south of Augsburg County and the town of Augsburg itself.

=== Fire brigade ===
The fire station of the volunteer fire brigade of Schwabmünchen is located at the Riedstraße 91in Schwabmünchen. Here a Löschzug (platoon for fire fighting) and a Rüstzug (platoon for technical help, e.g. road accidents) are stationed. The PSAP of Augsburg is responsible for alerting the fire brigade, also. Therefore, there is no fixed area of responsibility for the fire brigade. The area of operation is about the town of Schwabmünchen itself and for support all other districts of Schwabmünchen and the surrounding towns. The districts Schwabegg, Birkach, Klimmach and Mittelstetten do have independent fire brigades. The fire brigade of Schwabegg is equipped with a medium fire truck (Löschgruppenfahrzeug), the other districts are equipped with one small fire truck, each.

== Personalities ==
=== Sons and daughters of the city ===
- Leonhard Wagner (1453–1522), the most important calligrapher of the late German Renaissance, after whom the city's Hauptschule, Realschule and Gymnasium are named.
- Prof. Dr. Werner Huß (1936- ), ancient historian
- Peter Seitz (1931- ), Graphic Designer, Author, Professor, Business Owner
- Maria Blum (1890–1961), German politician
