= Andreas Farny =

German professional ice hockey player

- Born: September 17, 1992 (age 32); Augsburg, Germany
- Height: 1.83 m (6 ft 0 in)
- Weight: 86 kg (190 lb; 13 st 8 lb)
- Position: Forward
- Shoots: Left
- DEL team: Augsburger Panther
- NHL draft: Undrafted
- Playing career: 2010–present

Andreas Farny (born September 17, 1992) is a German professional ice hockey player. He is currently playing for Augsburger Panther in the Deutsche Eishockey Liga (DEL).
