= Buchloe station =

Railway station in Bavaria, Germany

Buchloe
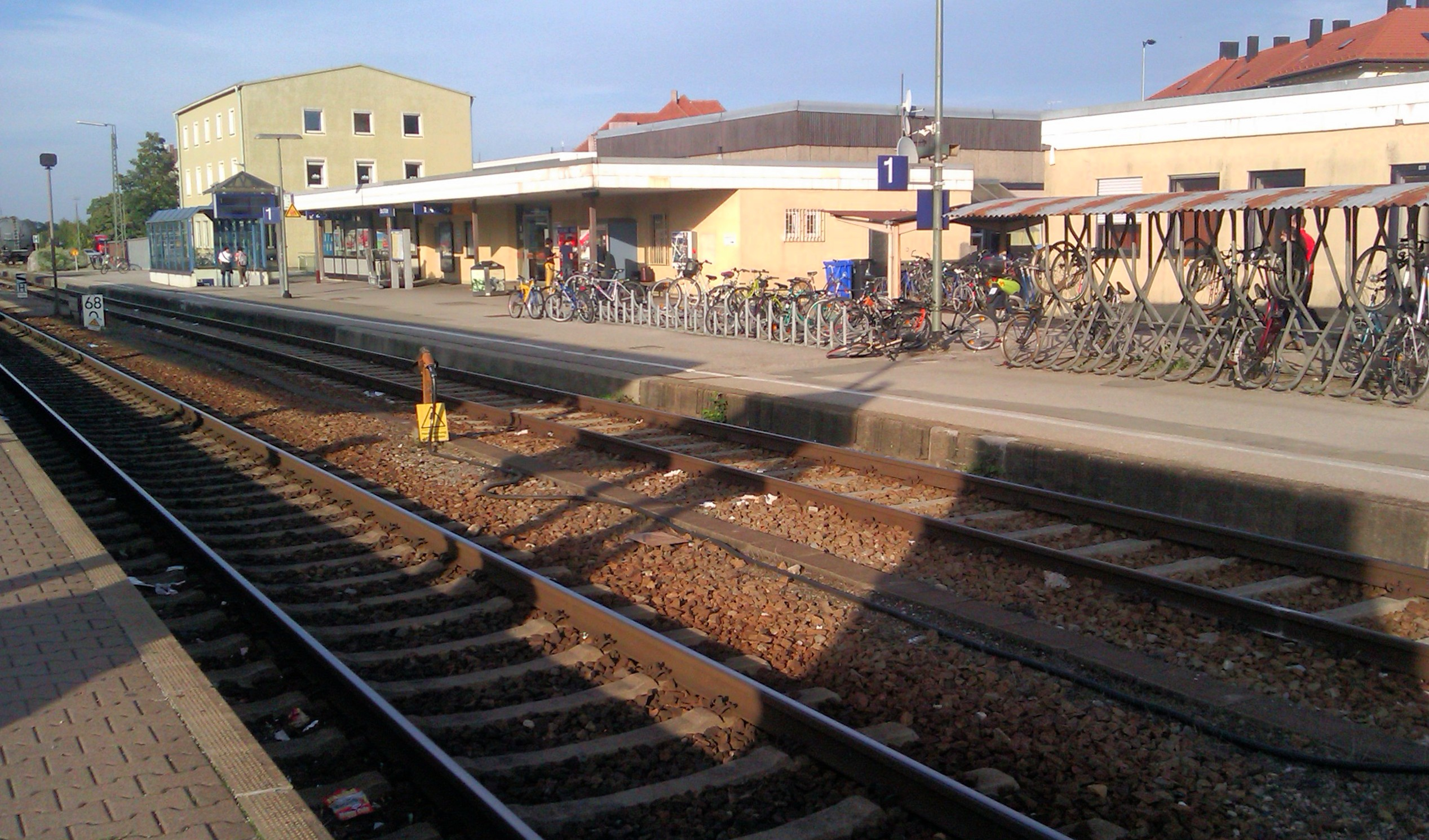

General information
- Location: Buchloe, Bavaria; Germany
- Coordinates: 48°02′02″N 10°42′59″E
- Owner: Deutsche Bahn
- Operator: DB Station&Service
- Lines: Augsburg–Buchloe; Munich–Buchloe; Buchloe–Memmingen; Buchloe–Lindau
- Platforms: 5

Construction
- Accessible: Yes

Other information
- Station code: 944
- DS100 code: MBU
- IBNR: 8000057
- Category: 3
- Website: www.bahnhof.de; stationsdatenbank.de

History
- Opened: 1 September 1847
Services
Preceding station	DB Fernverkehr	Following station
München Hbf Terminus	ECE 88	Memmingen towards Zürich HB
Preceding station	DB Regio Bayern	Following station
Terminus	RE 7	Augsburg Hbf towards Nürnberg Hbf
Kaufbeuren towards Lindau-Insel	RE 7	Augsburg Hbf towards Nürnberg Hbf
Kaufbeuren towards Oberstdorf	RE 17	Schwabmünchen towards Nürnberg Hbf
Kaufbeuren towards Lindau-Insel	RE 70	Kaufering towards München Hbf
Türkheim towards Memmingen	RE 71	Schwabmünchen towards Augsburg Hbf
Schwabmünchen towards Augsburg Hbf	RE 73	Türkheim towards Bad Wörishofen
Kaufbeuren towards Oberstdorf	RE 76	Kaufering towards München Hbf
Terminus	RB 74	Kaufering towards München Hbf
Schwabmünchen towards Augsburg Hbf	RE 79	Kaufbeuren towards Kempten (Allgäu) Hbf
Preceding station		Following station
Kaufbeuren towards Füssen	RB 68	Kaufering towards München Hbf
Schwabmünchen towards Augsburg Hbf	RB 77	Kaufbeuren towards Füssen
Preceding station		Following station
Türkheim towards Memmingen	RE 72	Kaufering towards München Hbf
Türkheim towards Lindau-Reutin	RE 96	Kaufering towards München Hbf
Location
- Location within Bavaria Location within Germany Location within Europe

Buchloe station is the only station in the town of Buchloe in the German state of Bavaria. It is at the junction of the Augsburg–Buchloe and Buchloe–Memmingen, Munich–Buchloe and the Buchloe–Lindau railways.

== History ==
Buchloe station was established with the Augsburg–Kaufbeuren railway, which opened on 1 September 1847. The station building was completed a year later on 15 October 1848. The station at that time was about a kilometre from the town of Buchloe. The town then had about 850 inhabitants and was selected as one of eleven waterering points and stations for handling fast freight between Augsburg and Lindau. A loading dock in the loading shed for three wagons and a cattle ramp were built after the construction of the station building. Similarly, there was a 35-metre long carriage shed, where minor repairs could be made. A few years later, many houses were built along Bahnhofstrasse (station street). Business increased with the construction of the Munich–Memmingen line through Buchloe. The old freight shed and the carriage shed were later replaced by a new freight shed, a locomotive shed with two tracks and an accommodation building. A building for the office of the track supervisor (Bahnmeisterei) and other buildings were also built. On 1 May 1897, the Buchloe North and Buchloe South mechanical signal boxes were built.

== Station buildings ==
The original brick station building opened in 1848 was built by local craftsmen. The price was 15,197 guilders. It was a local freight office and contained a ticket office, a luggage room, waiting rooms for first and second class and various offices for operations. The building had three round arched entrances and a clock tower and bell. On the first floor were the apartments of the station manager and the track supervisor. The post office and telegraph services were also housed in the building. The main station building was demolished in 1873 and rebuilt for 160,000 guilders; other station buildings were renovated. On the first floor of the new station building there were flats at the back.

=== 1967–2015 building ===
The station building built in 1873 was demolished in 1967. A new concrete building was constructed, which still exists today. It includes a counter, which is open each day, a kiosk and a small waiting area. There are three ticket machines. Two are located here next to the entrance to the station building from the north, one is in the passageway to Karwendelstraße.

=== 2015 building ===
In July 2014, construction of a new station building began, with completion planned for spring 2015 or October 2015. The new building consists of two buildings connected by a covered courtyard and is intended to provide a comfortable stay for rail passengers and visitors to the city. The station building accommodated a DB travel centre, a book and magazine store, a fast-food restaurant, a shop for travel supplies with a bakery and public toilets. The cost of the project was estimated at around €2 million, of which the municipality of Buchloe was to cover significantly more than €500,000. The project was received with mixed reactions by the population. The main criticisms were the sloping roof shape, the fast-food restaurant, the lack of a roof over the southern entrance area and the high costs for the town.

== Operations ==
=== Long distance services ===
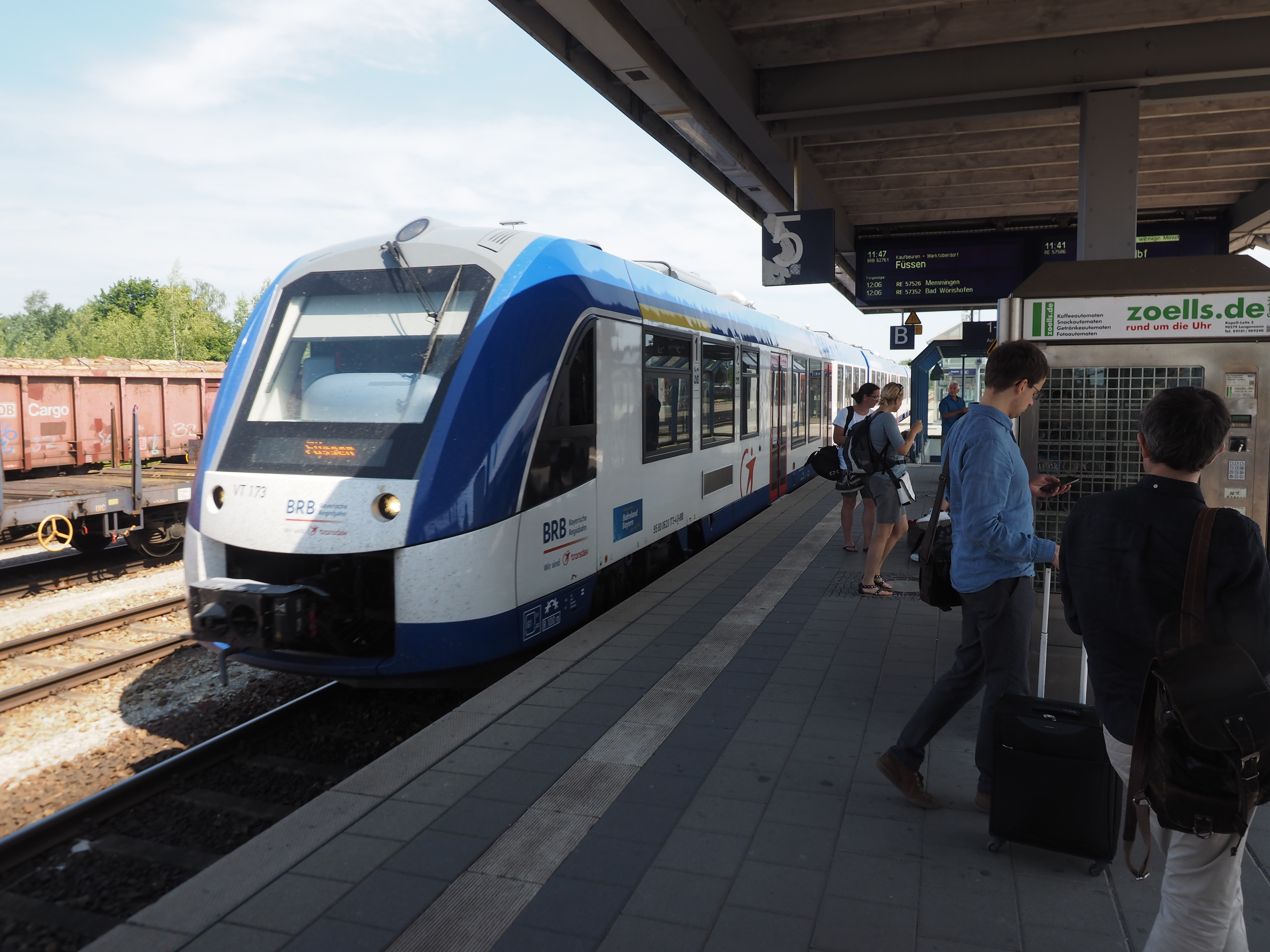
A train to Füssen at Buchloe station.

Line	Route	Frequency
ECE 88	Munich – Buchloe – Memmingen – Lindau-Reutin – Bregenz – Zürich HB	8 trains pairs

=== Regional services ===
Train class	Route	Frequency
RE 7	(Nuremberg –) Augsburg – Buchloe – Kaufbeuren – Kempten – Immenstadt – Lindau-Reutin	Every 2 hours
RE 17	(Nuremberg –) Augsburg – Buchloe – Kaufbeuren – Kempten – Immenstadt – Sonthofen – Oberstdorf	Every 2 hours
RE 70	Munich – Buchloe – Kaufbeuren – Kempten – Immenstadt – Hergatz – Lindau-Reutin	Every 2 hours
RE 71	Augsburg – Bobingen – Schwabmünchen – Buchloe – Türkheim – Mindelheim – Memmingen	Every 2 hours
RE 72	Munich – Buchloe – Türkheim – Mindelheim – Memmingen	Every 2 hours
RE 73	Augsburg – Bobingen – Schwabmünchen – Buchloe – Türkheim – Bad Wörishofen	Every 2 hours
RE 76	Munich – Buchloe – Kaufbeuren – Kempten – Immenstadt – Sonthofen – Oberstdorf	Every 2 hours
RE 79	(Augsburg –) Buchloe - Kaufbeuren - Biessenhofen - Kempten	Hourly
RE 96	Munich – Buchloe – Memmingen – Kißlegg – Lindau-Insel – Lindau-Reutin	Every 2 hours
RB 68	Munich – Buchloe – Kaufbeuren – Marktoberdorf – Füssen	3 train pairs
RB 74	Munich – Buchloe	Hourly
RB 77	Augsburg – Bobingen – Buchloe – Kaufbeuren – Marktoberdorf – Füssen	Hourly

== See also ==
- Rail transport in Germany
- Railway stations in Germany
