= Kaufbeuren station =

Railway station in Kaufbeuren, Germany

Kaufbeuren
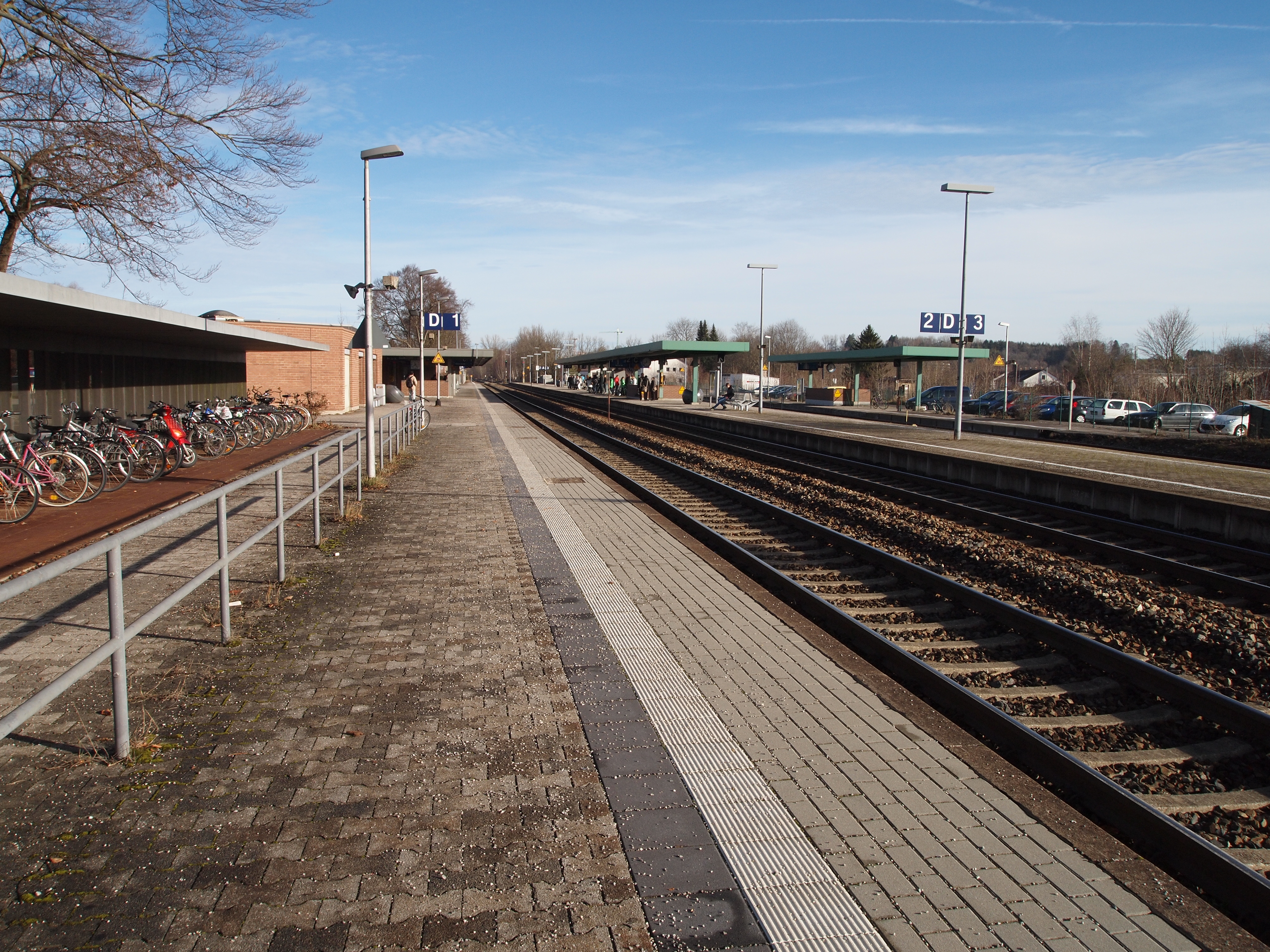
- 2012

General information
- Location: Bahnhofstraße 10; 87600 Kaufbeuren; Bavaria; Germany
- Coordinates: 47.87565°N 10.62959°E
- Elevation: 681 m (2,234 ft)
- Owner: Deutsche Bahn
- Operator: DB Netz; DB Station&Service
- Lines: Buchloe–Lindau railway (KBS 970); Kaufbeuren–Schongau railway (KBS 966)
- Platforms: 1 island platform 2 side platforms
- Tracks: 4
- Train operators: Bayerische Regiobahn; DB Regio Bayern
- Connections: 5 6 7 8 10 11 12 13 16 17 18 54 57 58 75 76

Construction
- Parking: yes
- Cycle facilities: yes
- Accessible: no

Other information
- Station code: 3141
- DS100 code: MKFB
- IBNR: 8000194
- Category: 4
- Website: www.bahnhof.de

History
- Opened: 1 September 1847; 178 years ago

Services
Preceding station	DB Regio Bayern	Following station
Kempten (Allgäu) Hbf towards Lindau-Insel	RE 7	Buchloe towards Nürnberg Hbf
Kempten (Allgäu) Hbf towards Oberstdorf	RE 17	Buchloe towards Nürnberg Hbf
Kempten (Allgäu) Hbf towards Lindau-Insel	RE 70	Buchloe towards München Hbf
Kempten (Allgäu) Hbf towards Oberstdorf	RE 76	Buchloe towards München Hbf
Biessenhofen towards Kempten (Allgäu) Hbf	RE 79	Buchlore towards Augsburg Hbf
Preceding station		Following station
Biessenhofen towards Füssen	RB 68	Buchloe towards München Hbf
Biessenhofen towards Augsburg Hbf	RB 77	Buchloe towards Füssen
Location
- Location within Bavaria Location within Germany Location within Europe

Kaufbeuren station (German: Bahnhof Kaufbeuren) is a railway station in the municipality of Kaufbeuren, located in Bavaria, Germany.
