= Füssen station =

Railway station in Füssen, Germany

Füssen
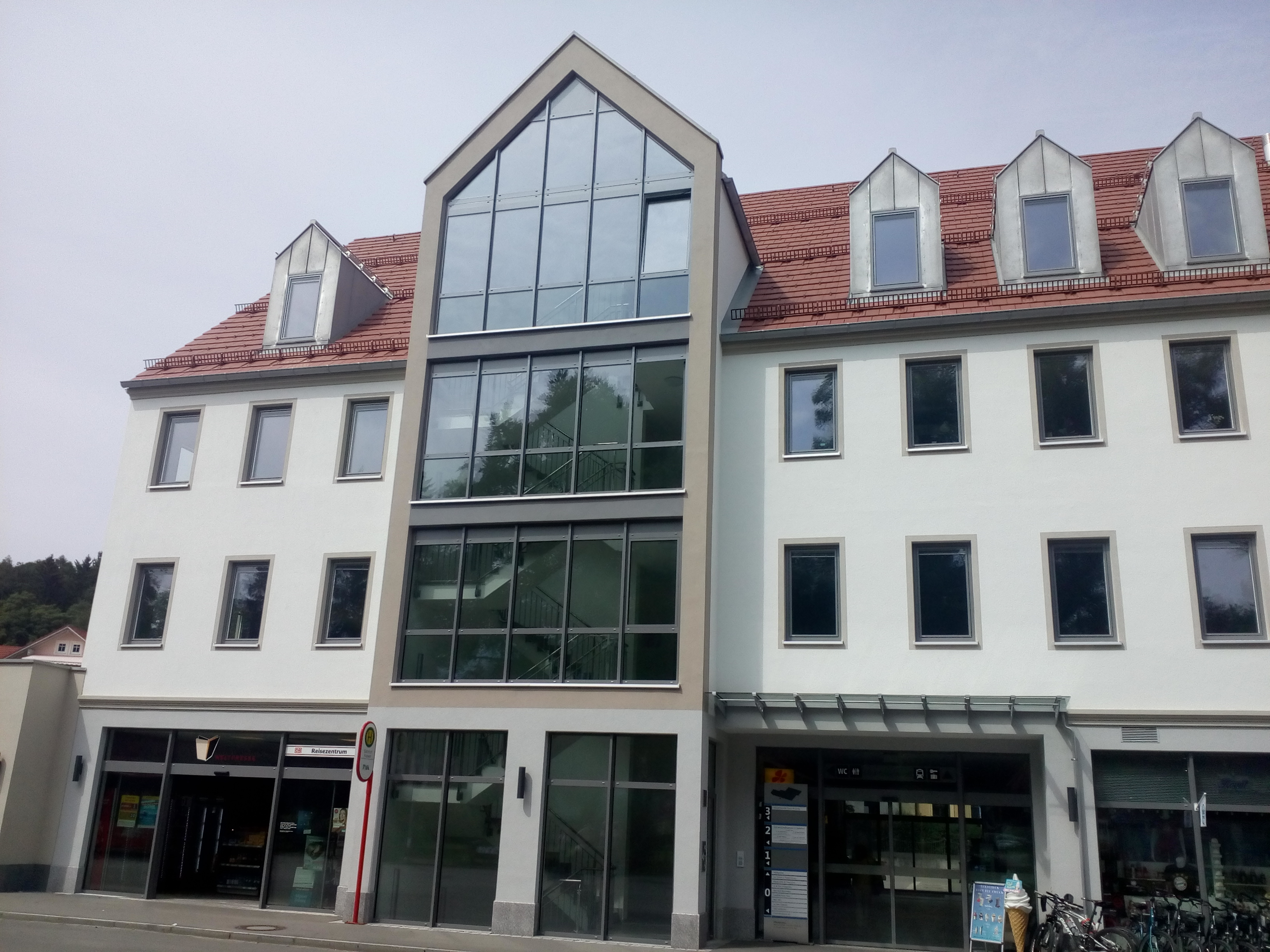

General information
- Location: Bahnhofstr. 12, Füssen, Bavaria; Germany
- Coordinates: 47°34′13″N 10°41′52″E
- Elevation: 797 m (2,615 ft)
- Owner: Deutsche Bahn
- Operator: DB Netz; DB Station&Service
- Lines: Biessenhofen–Füssen (KBS 974) (30.58 km)
- Platforms: 2
- Train operators: Bayerische Regiobahn
- Connections: RB 68 RB 77

Other information
- Station code: 1992
- DS100 code: MFSN
- IBNR: 8002156
- Category: 6
- Website: www.bahnhof.de

History
- Opened: 1 June 1889

Passengers
- 2,700

Services
Preceding station		Following station
Terminus	RB 68 Runs as Neuschwanstein-Express on weekend	Weizern-Hopferau towards München Hbf
Terminus	RB 77	Weizern-Hopferau towards Augsburg Hbf
Location
- Location within Bavaria Location within Germany Location within Europe

Walking into Füssen station from the street

Departing the station

Füssen Station is the station in the town of Füssen, Bavaria, Germany. It has two platform tracks and is classified by Deutsche Bahn as a category 6 station. It is served by about 20 trains of Deutsche Bahn daily and used by approximately 2,700 passengers daily. The station is the terminus of the Biessenhofen–Füssen railway, also known as the König-Ludwig-Bahn ("King Ludwig Railway"). It is the closest station to Neuschwanstein Castle.

Apart from Füssen station, the town once had a station called Hopfensee. In addition, Ulrichsbrücke-Füssen station on the Ausserfern Railway is named after the town; it is about five kilometres to the southwest in Austria.

== Location ==
The station is located to the west of the town, about 200 metres northeast of central Füssen. The station building is located on Bahnhofsstraße, to the southeast of the railway tracks. On the south side of Bahnhofstrasse is the station parking area, including the bus station. Further south of the street is a park. To the east is Rupprechtstraße, to the northeast is the street of Am Ziegelstadl. Further north, there is the Ziegelberg (hill), which is surrounded by a wooded area. The surrounding development is dominated by the tax office, to the north, the post office and the Hotel Luitpold to the southeast.

The station is located 30.619 km from Biessenhofen on the branch line and lies at an altitude of 808 m above sea level.

== History ==
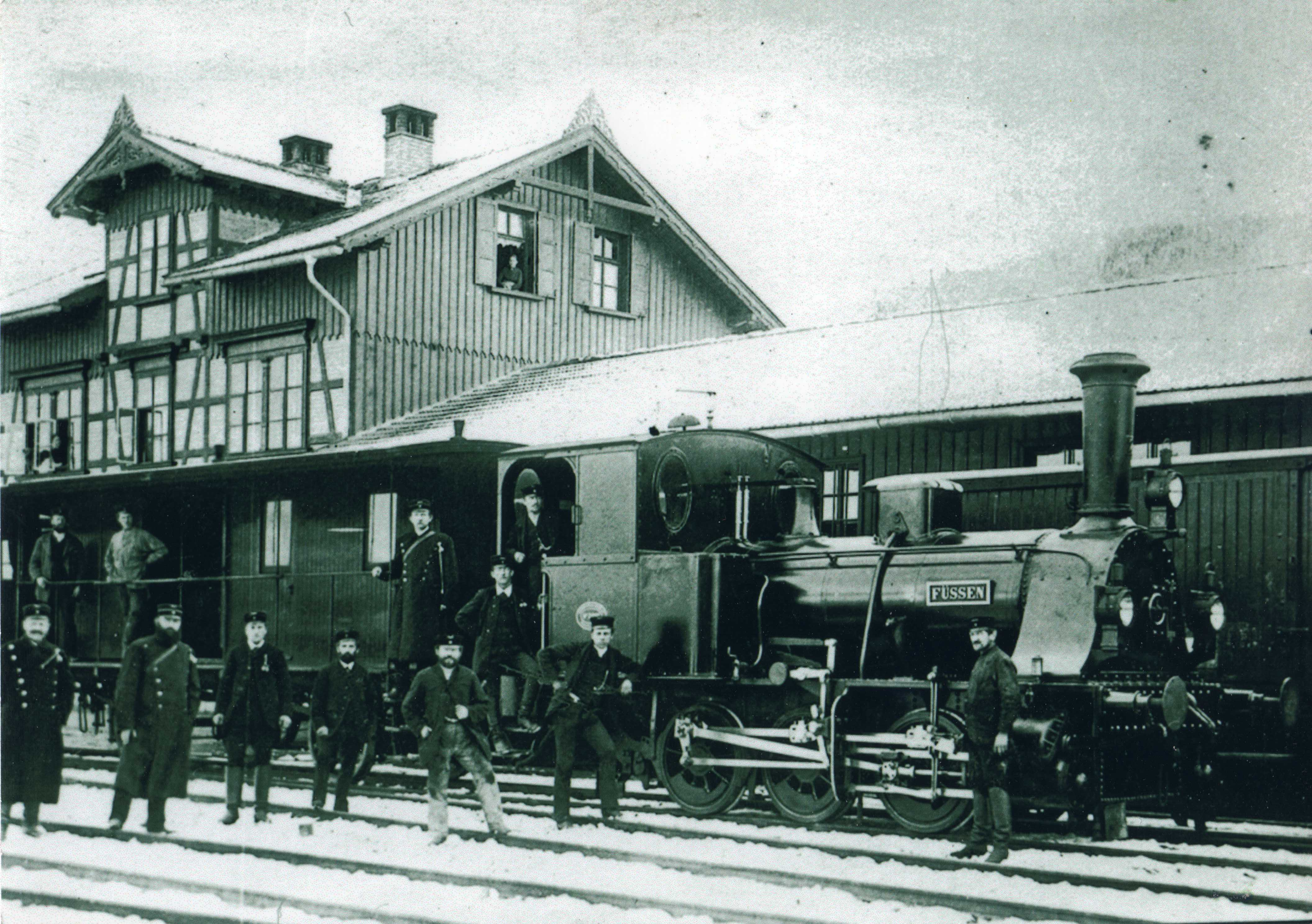
Locomotive "Füssen" in Füssen station

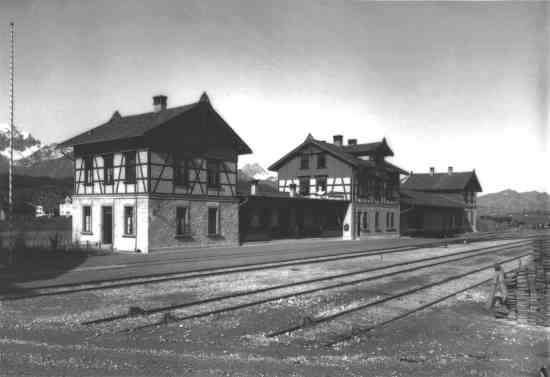
Füssen station about 1890

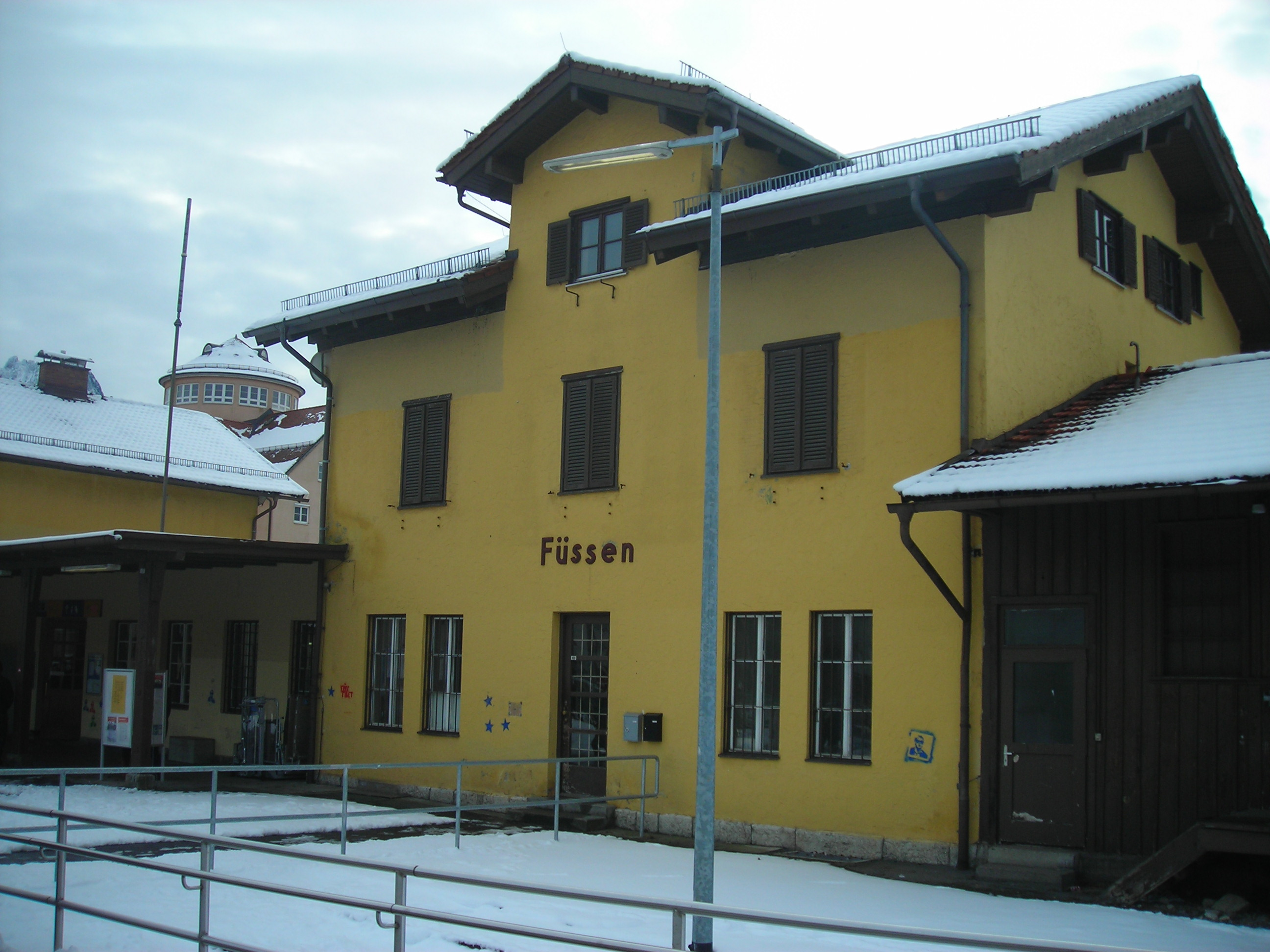
Füssen station 2011

On 14 March 1888, Prince Regent Luitpold granted the concession for the construction of the Oberdorf–Füssen line to the Lokalbahn AG (LAG) company. The railway and Füssen station were put into operation on 1 December 1888. The station was connected by a wide road to the centre of Füssen. A two-story house was built next to the station for railway employees. The station building was built to the south of the railway tracks in a style then typical of the LAG and has similarities to the station buildings in Bad Heilbrunn and Oberau. The ground floor was built of freestone, the first floor was constructed with trusses, with the compartments filled with exposed brick. The attic was built with a wooden structure.

The station building included second and third class waiting rooms and offices. It also had an open lobby. In the middle of the building complex, there was another building which housed freight-handling facilities and additional offices. In addition, there was a freight shed and a two-storey customs house. All buildings were constructed in the same style.

A station restaurant was built at the current location of Bahnhofstrasse 10 in 1890; this building was taken over by the post office in 1923. Many prestigious buildings were built near the station at the turn of the century, such as the tax office. The station building was considered to have a rustic character, leading to decision being taken to renovate it in 1923. The renovation did not start until 1929 and it was completed in 1930. During the reconstruction of the lobby the waiting rooms were converted into a ticket hall. The waiting rooms were moved to the station's residence, because this had only rarely been used. In addition, a new baggage hall was built, but it was felt to disturb the architecture of the station area.

In 1976, there was another reorganisation because the station building's roof was no longer watertight. The station building was painted yellow at the same time.

During the adoption of a new transport plan for central Füssen 2006, it was decided to demolish the old station building and replace it with a new building. A local referendum to reverse the decision to demolish the building was unsuccessful. The old station building was demolished in 2015, the new building finished in 2016.

== Infrastructure ==
The station is at the end of the line and has two platform tracks on an island platform, which are fully accessible behind the buffer stops. The station, however, has no electronic destination displays. Two additional sidings exist, only one of which is still connected.

=== Platform data ===
Platform lengths and heights are as follows:

- Track 2: length 140 m, height 55 cm
- Track 3: length 140 m, height 55 cm

== Operations ==
The station is served hourly by Regionalbahn services on the Augsburg–Füssen route (RB77). The Munich–Füssen route (RB 68) is also served by three train pairs a day. These are operated by Bayerische Regiobahn with Alstom Coradia LINT diesel multiple units. On weekends and public holidays, the RB 68 runs to Munich as the Neuschwanstein-Express with a slightly faster journey time of 1 hour and 52 minutes.

Train class	Route	Frequency
RB 68	Munich – Geltendorf – Kaufering – Buchloe – Kaufbeuren – Biessenhofen – Füssen	3 pairs
RB 77	Augsburg – Bobingen – Schwabmünchen – Buchloe – Kaufbeuren – Biessenhofen – Füssen	Hourly
