= Kempten (Allgäu) Hauptbahnhof =

Railway station in Bavaria, Germany

Kempten (Allgäu) Hbf
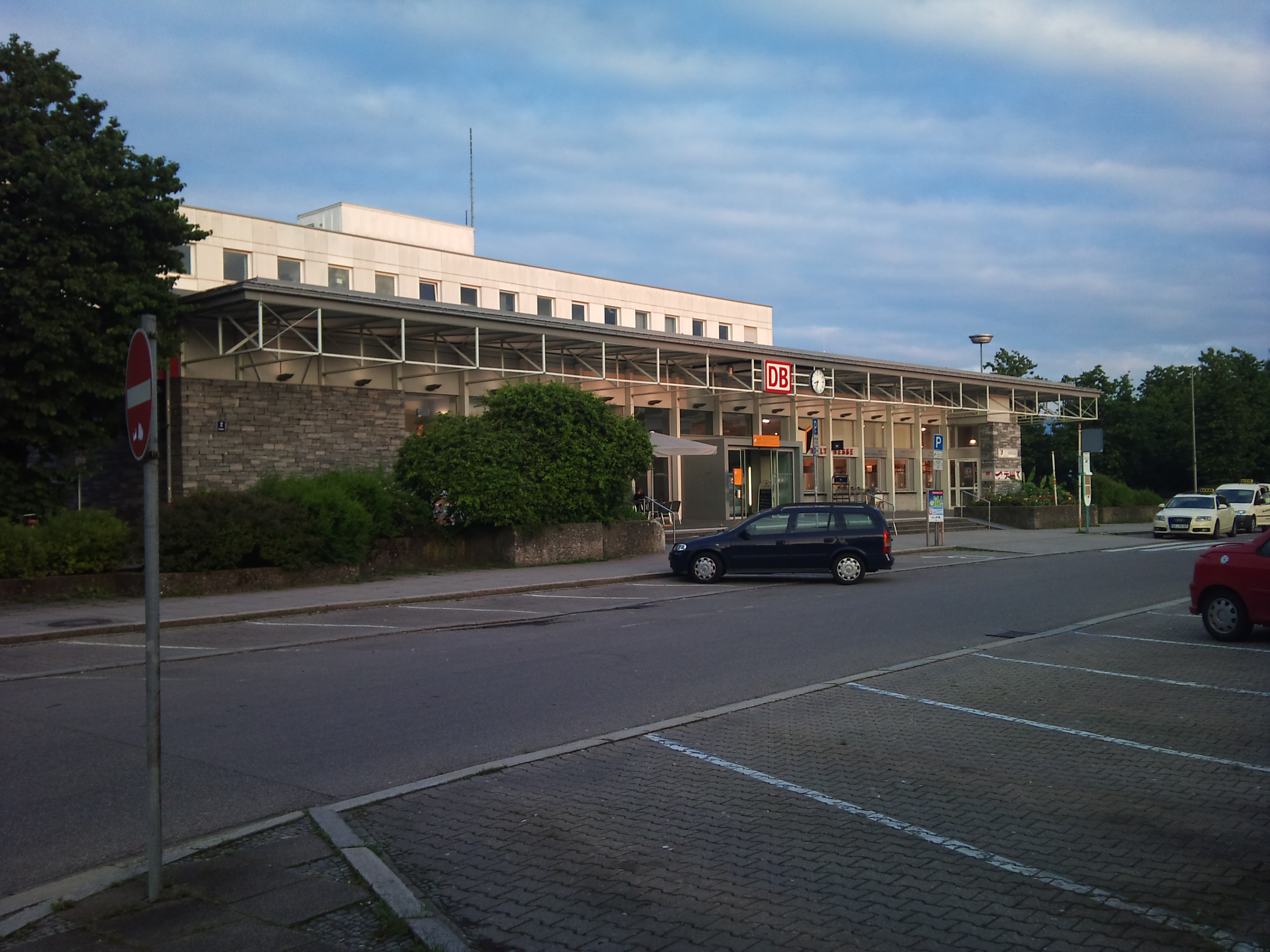

General information
- Location: Bahnhofplatz 2, Kempten, Bavaria; Germany
- Coordinates: 47°42′42″N 10°19′04″E
- Lines: Ulm–Kempten (KBS 975); Buchloe–Lindau (152.9 km) (KBS 970); Kempten–Garmisch-Partenkirchen (KBS 976); Kempten–Isny (closed)
- Platforms: 5

Construction
- Accessible: No

Other information
- Station code: 3155
- DS100 code: MKP
- IBNR: 8000197
- Category: 3
- Website: BEG-Stationssteckbrief; www.bahnhof.de

History
- Opened: 1852/1969
Services
| Preceding station | DB Fernverkehr | Following station |
|---|---|---|
| Immenstadt towards Oberstdorf | IC 55 Allgäu | Ulm Hbf towards Dortmund Hbf |
| Preceding station | DB Regio Bayern | Following station |
| Martinszell (Allgäu) towards Lindau-Insel | RE 7 | Kaufbeuren towards Nürnberg Hbf |
| Martinszell (Allgäu) towards Oberstdorf | RE 17 | Kaufbeuren towards Nürnberg Hbf |
| Immenstadt towards Lindau-Insel | RE 70 | Kaufbeuren towards München Hbf |
| Martinszell (Allgäu) towards Oberstdorf | RE 75 | Kempten (Allgäu) Ost towards Ulm Hbf |
| Immenstadt towards Oberstdorf | RE 76 | Kaufbeuren towards München Hbf |
| Terminus | RE 79 | Günzach towards Augsburg Hbf |
| Terminus | RB 73 | St Mang towards Pfronten |
| Martinszell (Allgäu) towards Hergatz | RB 94 | Terminus |
Location
- Location within Bavaria Location within Germany Location within Europe

Kempten (Allgäu) Hauptbahnhof is a railway station in Kempten in the German state of Bavaria. Kempten's most important station, it is a hub for the Neu-Ulm–Kempten railway, the Buchloe–Lindau railway and the Ausserfern Railway. The original Kempten station was built in 1852 as a terminal station near the centre of town, and was replaced by a through station in 1969.

== History ==
The first Kempten station, built during the construction of the Ludwig South-North Railway, opened on 1 April 1852 between Kaufbeuren and Kempten and was extended on 1 May 1853 from Kempten to Immenstadt. Due to its proximity to the city centre and that a crossing of the deep Iller Valley at a reasonable cost was only possible at a narrow point one kilometre south of the city, it was decided to build a terminus for passengers and freight. In 1853, the station had an administration building, a covered platform, an entrance hall and a freight shed. The building had three floors, a mezzanine and a low, sloping roof supported by purlins, reflecting traditional Alpine-foothill architecture. The building was typical of many commercial buildings during the early Industrial Revolution.

The commissioning of the Neu-Ulm–Kempten railway on 1 June 1863 and an increase in traffic led to the first reconstruction of the platform and track facilities in 1869. Between 1885 and 1888, much of the station was rebuilt by the Royal Bavarian State Railways. On 9 November 1888, the Renaissance-Revival entrance building was opened. It had a spacious entrance hall, three waiting rooms, and a room for royalty (German: Fürstenzimmer). A luggage train connected the luggage office with the three platforms and five tracks. The wings of the entrance building, which had been part of the previous station building, were raised to three stories (obscuring the view of the buildings from the station forecourt). The central building had two stories. The opening of the Außerfern Railway to Pfronten on 1 December 1895 and the line to Isny on 15 October 1909 led to further changes to the station.

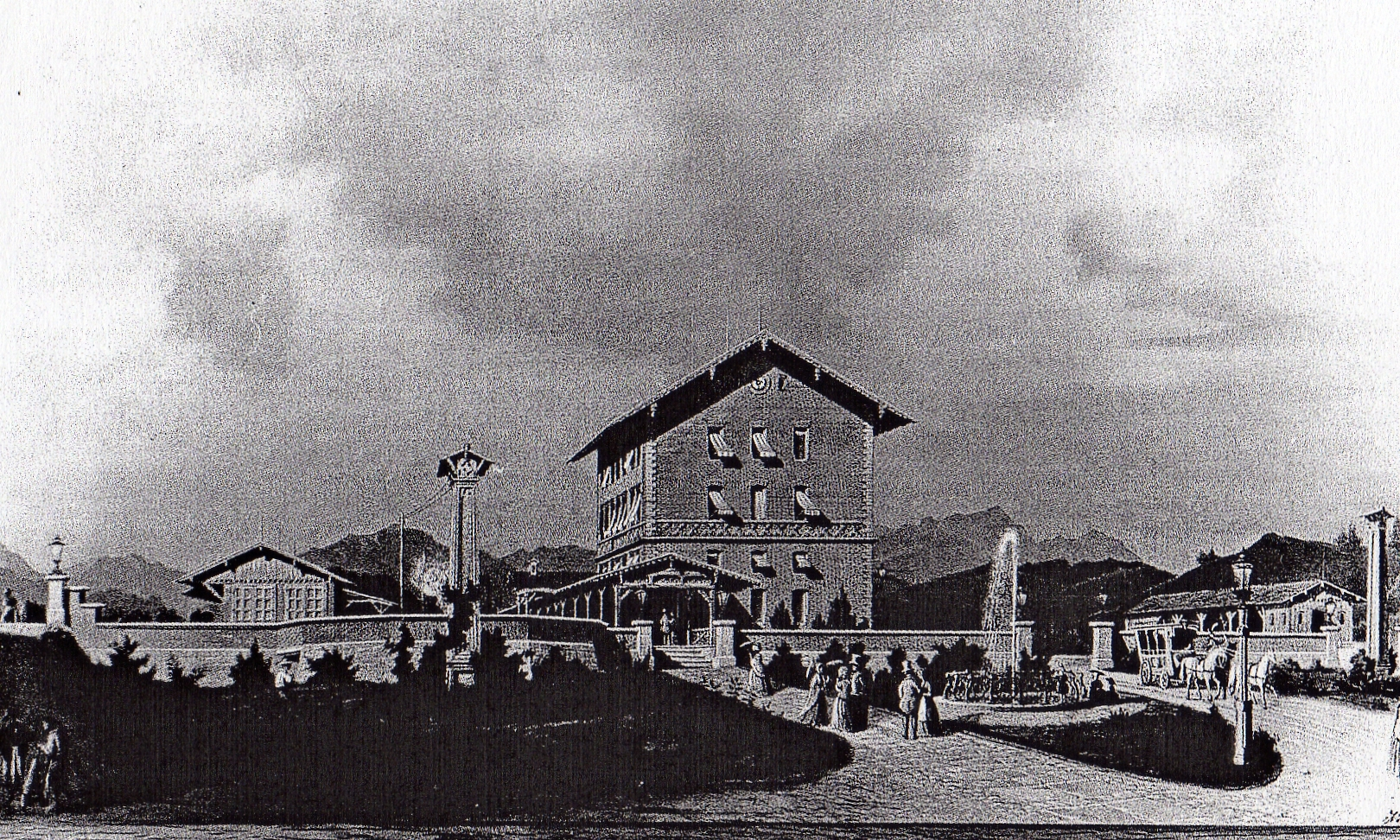
1854 drawing of the first Kempten station

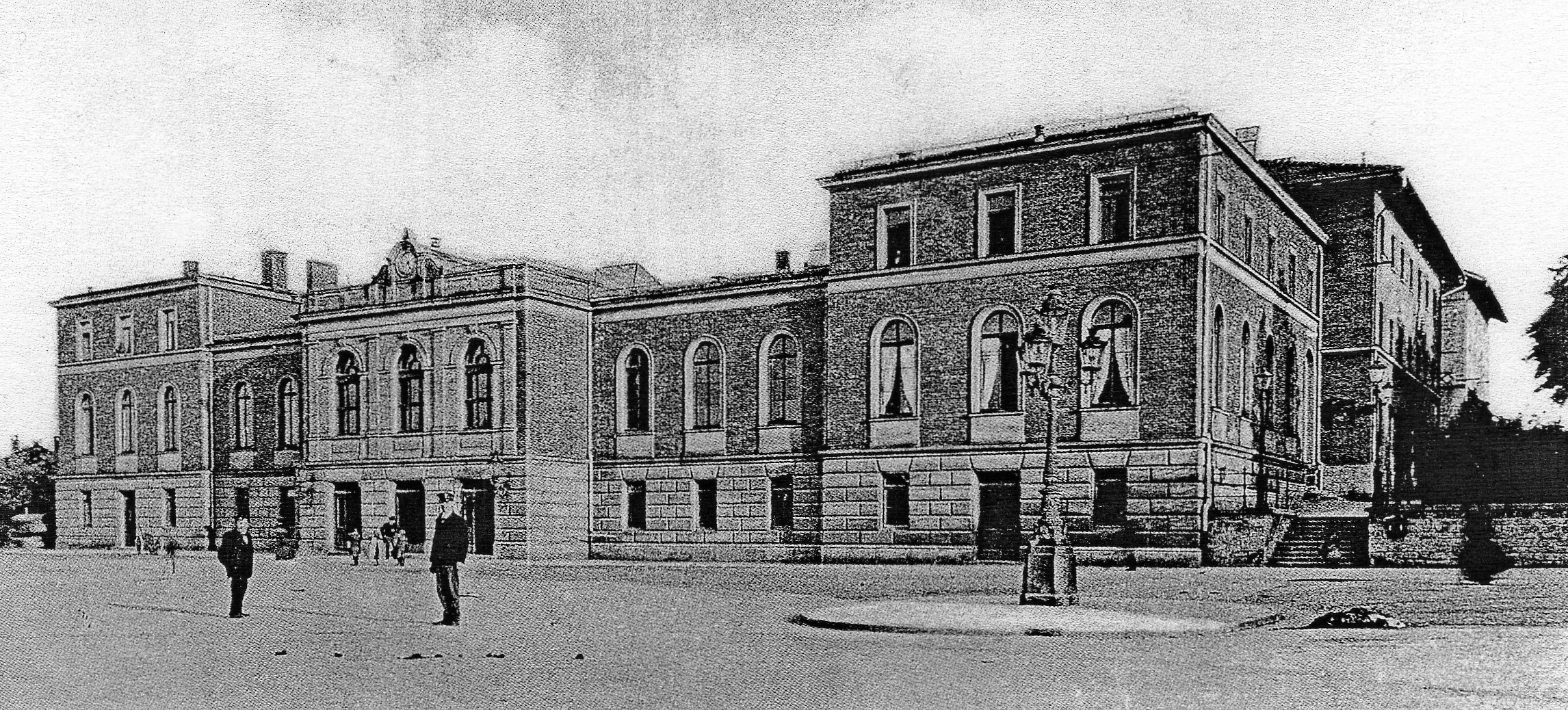
The terminal station in 1888, with a brick facade

The Kempten bypass railway was opened on 1 July 1907, which relieved the terminal station of through traffic (particularly freight). The bypass connected lines from Neu-Ulm, Kaufbeuren and Pfronten to the line to Immenstadt. An arched 155-metre bridge, made of tamped concrete and a main vault with a clearance of 64.5 metres, crossed the Iller at a height of 33 metres. North of the bridge, two tamped-concrete bridges were built on the access line to the station. The wood truss bridge formerly used by the line was converted into a road bridge. A marshalling yard was built on the bypass line to assemble freight trains from Bavaria and neighbouring countries in the northeast to Lake Constance, Switzerland and southwestern Europe; it had a capacity of 1,200 wagons per day. At the same time, the engine depot was moved about two kilometres from the station to south of the marshalling yard. The yard became less important in 1933, because long-distance freight trains used the newly-electrified Ulm–Augsburg line and avoided the hilly Allgäu line.

Some express trains began running on the bypass line in 1912, and all express trains began operating on the bypass line during the winter of 1925/1926. Trains stopped at Kempten-Hegge station, which was connected by shuttle trains or railbuses to the Hauptbahnhof 3.6 km away.

During the 1960s, the Kempten station handled about 10,000 daily passengers; forty percent were through traffic, 20 percent were transferring passengers, and 40 percent were local traffic. It was served by 200 passenger trains and 42 freight trains daily.

=== 1969 through station ===
In 1961, an overhaul of the Kempten railway facilities was approved. Feasibility studies indicated that construction of a through station would cost twice as much as renovating the existing station, but would significantly reduce operating costs. Kempten officials expected that the through station would improve traffic conditions in the inner city. The best location for the new station wase at the marshalling yard, about one kilometre south of the station. The access lines followed the former route of the bypass railway. To make the project financially feasible, the line would use the bypass bridge over the Iller.

Construction began in 1965. A total of 300,000 m^{3} earth was moved, and 34 kilometres of track and 180 sets of points were installed or re-laid. The passenger station was planned with four platforms and seven tracks, but a decline in traffic resulted in three platforms. The station building, west of the platforms, was planned to handle 1,500 daily ticket sales and 8.5 tons of luggage. The four-storey station building had 14,000 cubic metres of enclosed space and included Deutsche Bundesbahn (DB) offices, equipment for rail operations, and an 85-seat restaurant. A seven-metre-wide tunnel to the platforms was the first DB installation of a common structure for luggage and passengers. The station forecourt, with parking lots, bus stops and a taxi stand, was connected by a grade-separated interchange with federal highway 19. North of the station, an office building for Deutsche Bundespost was built. A relay interlocking was built south of the entrance building, replaced eleven signal boxes.

The depot, east of the passenger station, was reduced in scope after the switch from steam to diesel locomotion. The two roundhouses, with 45 stalls, were demolished. The depot had 95 diesel locomotives during the late 1960s, including 20 railbuses and 20 shunting locomotives. In 1950, Kempten had 55 steam locomotives. The engine change reduced the number of employees in the depot from 269 to 170. The total cost of the 1972 remodelling of the station was DM39.7 million.

The terminal station was demolished, and the Kempten-Hegge station was closed after the new station was commissioned. An educational complex, a shopping centre (Forum Allgäu) and an events hall (BigBOX Allgäu) were established in the former station area. The Iller bridge on the station approach was converted into a road bridge and the wooden bridge, which had been converted to a road bridge, was converted again for cyclists and pedestrians.

== Infrastructure ==
Several bus routes downtown and to surrounding communities operate from the bus stop in the station forecourt. The station building was renovated and modernised in 2008, with three ticket offices and five ticket machines; several shops are in the side rooms. The main entrance is from the west, where there are bus and taxi connections. Parking is available; east of the platforms are long-term parking spaces, with underground access to the platforms. The tracks are typically used as follows:

| Track | Length (m) | Height (cm) | Traffic | Direction |
|---|---|---|---|---|
| 1 | 330 | 38 | Local | Immenstadt |
| 2 | 417 | 38 | Local and regional | Memmingen |
| 3 | 417 | 38 | Local and regional | Immenstadt |
| 4 | 439 | 38 | Local and regional | Buchloe / Memmingen |
| 5 | 439 | 38 | Local | Pfronten-Steinach |

== Operations ==
In the 2026 timetable, the following services stopped at the station: (RE 7 is part of Bodensee S-Bahn):

| Line | Route | | Frequency |
|---|---|---|---|
| IC 55 | Dortmund – Essen – Düsseldorf – Cologne – Bonn – Koblenz – Mainz – Mannheim – Heidelberg – Stuttgart – Ulm – Kempten – Oberstdorf | | 1 train pair |
| RE 7 | (Nuremberg –) Augsburg – Buchloe – Kaufbeuren – Kempten – Immenstadt (train split) | – Lindau-Reutin | Every 2 hours |
| RE 17 | (Nuremberg –) Augsburg – Buchloe – Kaufbeuren – Kempten – Immenstadt (train split) | – Oberstdorf | Every 2 hours |
| RE 70 | Munich – Kaufering – Buchloe – Kaufbeuren – Kempten – Immenstadt (train split) | – Lindau-Reutin | Every 2 hours |
| RE 76 | Munich – Kaufering – Buchloe – Kaufbeuren – Kempten – Immenstadt (train split) | – Oberstdorf | Every 2 hours |
| RE 75 | Ulm – Memmingen – Kempten – Immenstadt – Oberstdorf | | Hourly |
| RE 79 | (Augsburg –) Buchloe – Kaufbeuren – Kempten (– Oberstdorf) | | Hourly |
| RB 73 | Kempten – Pfronten-Steinach | | Hourly |
| RB 94 | Hergatz – Immenstadt – Kempten | | Some trains |

== See also ==
- Rail transport in Germany
- Railway stations in Germany
