= Oberstdorf station =

Railway station in Oberstdorf, Germany

Oberstdorf
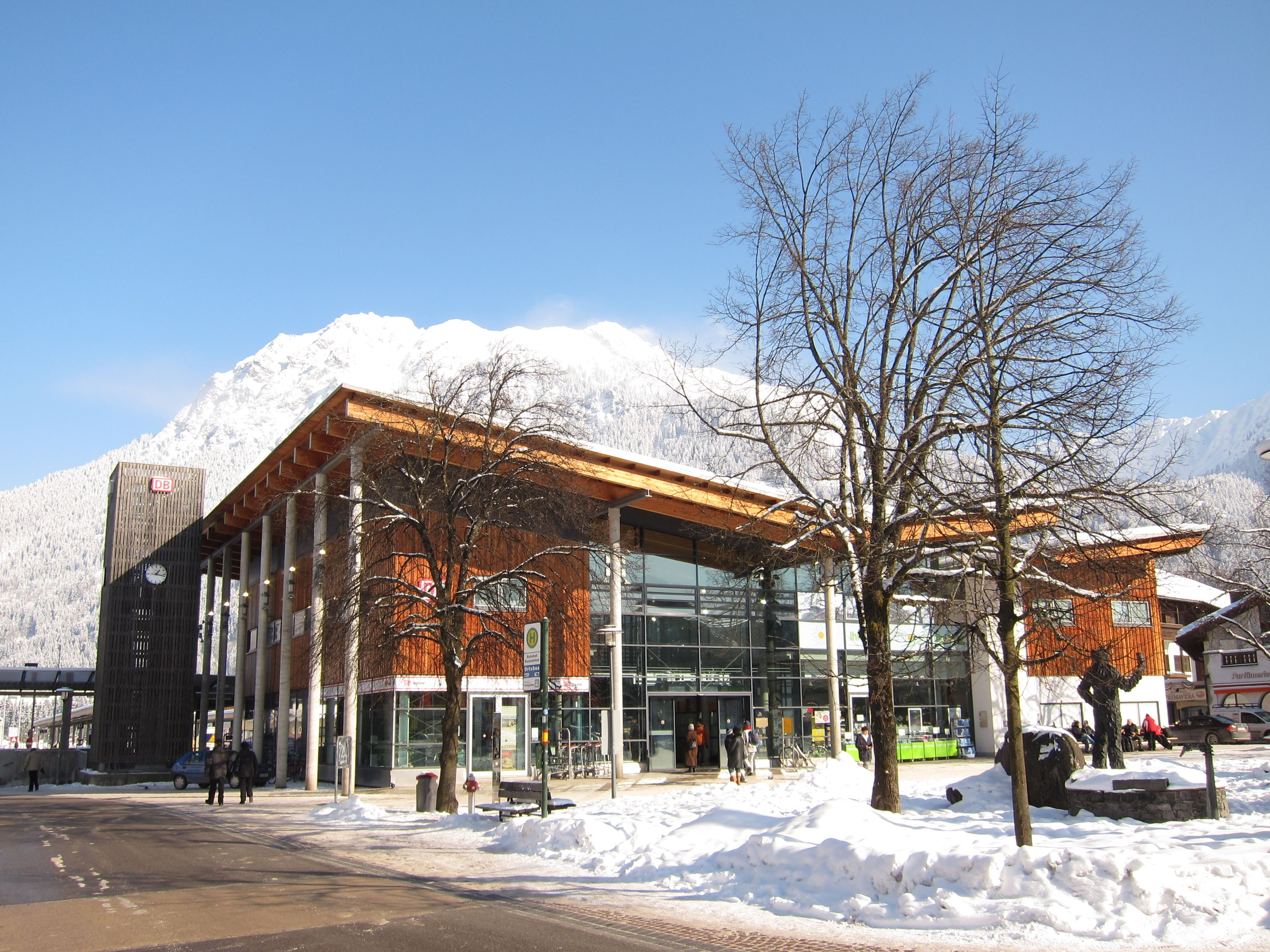
- Street side of the station

General information
- Location: Oberstdorf, Bavaria; Germany
- Coordinates: 47°24′38″N 10°16′37″E
- Owner: Deutsche Bahn
- Operator: DB Netz; DB Station&Service
- Lines: Immenstadt–Oberstdorf (KBS 970 / 975)
- Platforms: 5

Construction
- Accessible: Yes
- Architect: Rhoda, Kellermann, Wawrowsky

Other information
- Station code: 4694
- DS100 code: MOF
- IBNR: 8004585
- Category: 3
- Website: stationsdatenbank.bayern.de; www.bahnhof.de

History
- Opened: 29 July 1888

Passengers
- 1545 (2006)

Services
Preceding station	DB Fernverkehr	Following station
Fischen towards Dortmund Hbf	ICE 55 Allgäu	Terminus
Preceding station	DB Regio Bayern	Following station
Langenwang (Schwab) towards Nürnberg Hbf	RE 17	Terminus
Langenwang (Schwab) towards Ulm Hbf	RE 75	Terminus
Langenwang (Schwab) towards München Hbf	RE 76	Terminus
Langenwang (Schwab) towards Kempten Hbf	RE 79	Terminus
Location
- Location within Germany Location within Bavaria

Oberstdorf station is the station of the Bavarian market town of Oberstdorf in the German state of Bavaria. It has five platforms and is classified by Deutsche Bahn as a category 3 station. The station is served by about 40 trains daily operated by Deutsche Bahn and Regentalbahn. The station is the terminus of the Immenstadt–Oberstdorf railway.

== Location ==
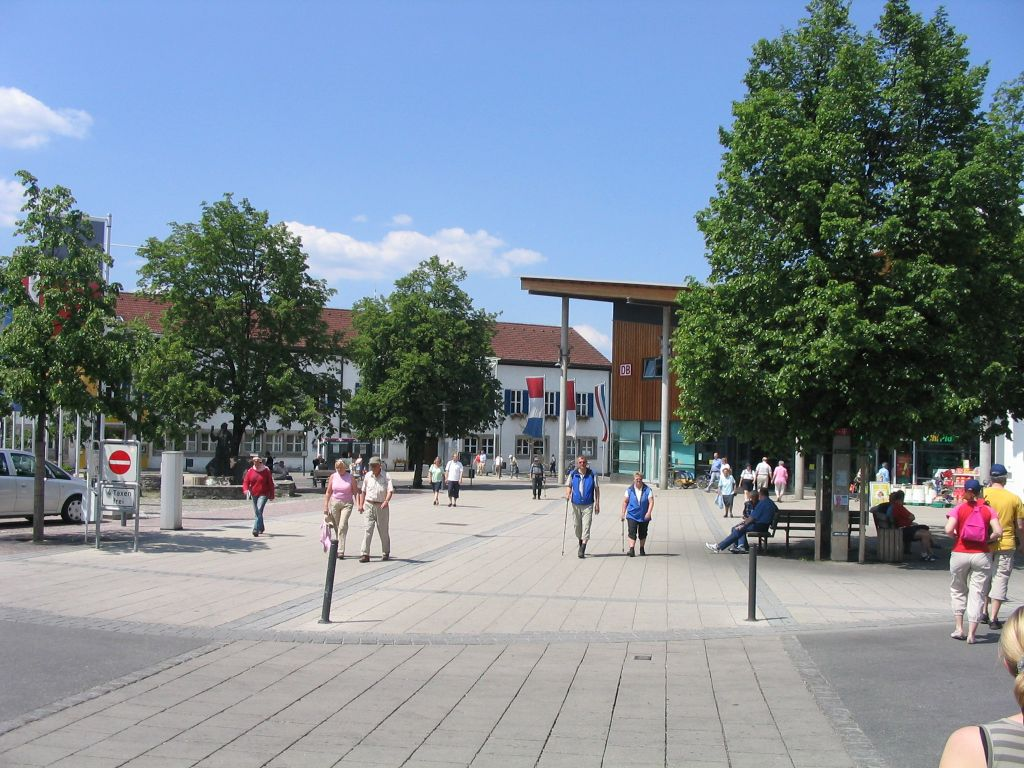
Station forecourt

The station is located to the north of central Oberstdorf. The station is connected to the town centre by the Hauptstraße (main street), which runs to the south of the station from the station forecourt. The station building is located on the forecourt and has the address of Bahnhofstraße 2. It runs perpendicular to the platforms at the end of the railway tracks. Bahnhofstrasse (station street) runs from the station forecourt on the eastern side of the station. The name of Bahnhofstrasse changes to Friedhofstraße (cemetery street) near the end of the platforms where some sidings begin. Next to the sidings is Oberstdorf cemetery. To the west of the station on Poststraße there is a bus station, which has two bus platforms. A little further west on Poststraße, is Straße Im Steinach. Between Straße Im Steinach and the station are residences and an industrial park. To the north Straße Im Steinach crosses the railway tracks over a level crossing. After crossing the railway tracks it runs past the eastern end of Friedhofstraße and becomes the Straße Am Bannholz.

== History ==
On 16 November 1873, the Royal Bavarian State Railways opened the Immenstadt–Sonthofen railway to connect with the Buchloe–Lindau railway. The Oberstdorf community then campaigned for a rail connection. As the Royal Bavarian State Railroad was not interested, the private Lokalbahn AG (LAG) company applied for a concession to extend the Immenstadt–Sonthofen line to Oberstdorf. The line was opened on 29 July 1888. The station building, which was built in the company style of Lokalbahn AG, and a rolling stock depot (Bahnbetriebswerk) for the maintenance of LAG rolling stock on the line were opened at the same time. On 1 August 1938, the station was nationalised along with the Sonthofen–Oberstdorf line. On 23 March 1951, the depot became a branch of Kempten rolling stock depot. The Oberstdorf branch office was closed on 1 January 1964. The station building was destroyed in the Second World War, so a new station was built in 1963. Since 1976, operations in Oberstdorf station has been controlled by the dispatcher at Oberstdorf signal box, which entered service in 1976. It is a track plan interlocking of Lorenz class 60. The station building built in 1963 was replaced by a newer building in 2001. The station was voted the best small town station of the year by Allianz pro Schiene (Pro Rail Alliance) in 2006. This award was particularly based on the new station building and the Oberstdorf transport plan.

== Infrastructure ==
=== Station buildings ===
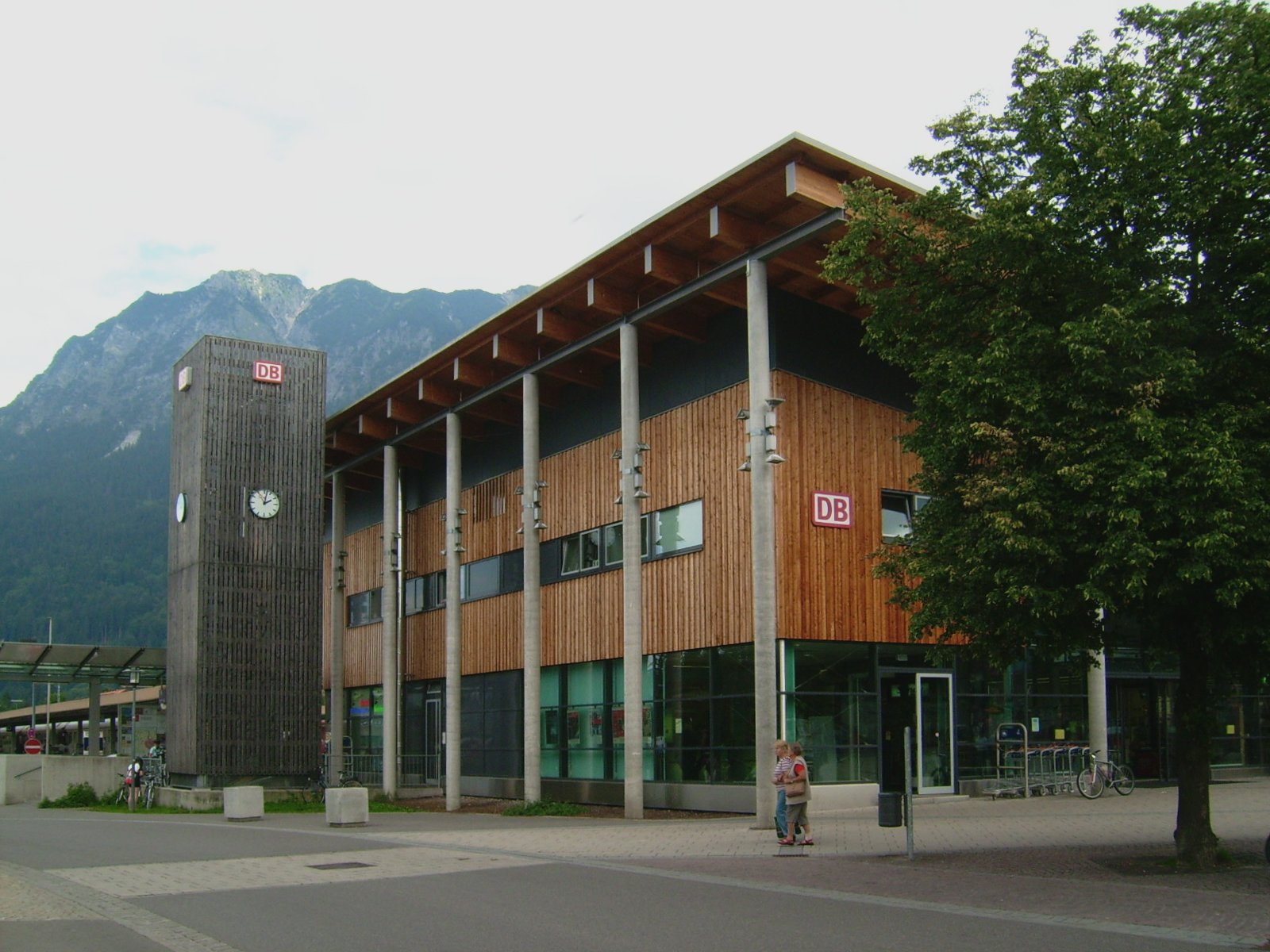
The station building from the street side

The station building built in 1963 was replaced in 2001 by a newer, more modern building. It was designed by the architects Rhoda, Kellermann and Wawrowsky. The building cost about eleven million Marks, which would now correspond to about €5.6 million. The building is covered with wood and is owned by DB Station&Service. The building has an area of about 12,000 square metres and contains six shops and a ticket office. The station buildings also contains public toilets.

=== Platforms ===
The station has five tracks on three platforms. Track 1 is on a side platform. Tracks 2 and 3 are on a central platform and tracks 4 and 5 are on another. The station building is to the south across the ends of the platforms. Track 2 and 4 are used by Regional-Express services to Augsburg. The Allgäu-Franken-Express in contrast runs from track 1. Track 3 is served by Regional-Express trains to Ulm. The alex service to Munich and Intercity services use tracks 4 and 5. All platforms are roofed and are fitted with digital train destination indicators. All trains are accessible by wheelchair. There are several shops and a travel centre in the station building.

Platform 1 is 227 metres long and 38 cm high. The central platform between tracks 2 and 3 has a length of 273 metres and a height of 38 cm. The platform between tracks 4 and 5 is 38 cm high and 330 metres long.

== Operations ==
Oberstdorf station is served by around 40 trains daily. It is served by a pair of Intercity services called the Allgäu to/from Dortmund. Until 2025, it was formerly served by a pair of Intercity Express services, called the Nebelhorn, to/from Hamburg. It is served by several regional services from Augsburg, Ulm or Munich. In the 2026 timetable, the following services stopped at the station:

Train class/ line	Route		Frequency
ICE 55	Dortmund – Essen – Düsseldorf – Cologne – Bonn – Koblenz – Mainz – Mannheim – Heidelberg – Stuttgart – Ulm – Oberstdorf		1 train pair
RE 17	(Nürnberg –) Augsburg – Buchloe – Kempten (Allgäu) – Immenstadt – Oberstdorf		Every 2 hours
RE 75	Ulm – Memmingen – Kempten – Immenstadt – Oberstdorf		Hourly
RE 76	Munich – Kaufering – Buchloe – Kaufbeuren – Kempten – Immenstadt – Oberstdorf		Every 2 hours
RE 79	(Buchloe –)	Kempten – Immenstadt – Sonthofen – Fischen – Oberstdorf	One train pair Sat+Sun
RE 79	Augsburg – Kaufbeuren –	Kempten – Immenstadt – Sonthofen – Fischen – Oberstdorf	Single service Mon-Fri

== See also ==
- Rail transport in Germany
