= Augsburg-Land =

Federal electoral district of Germany

Coordinates: 48°21′43″N 10°49′55″E

252 Augsburg-Land
- Electoral district for the Bundestag
- Augsburg-Land in 2025
- State: Bavaria
- Population: 331,300 (2019)
- Electorate: 231,356 (2025)
- Major settlements: Friedberg; Königsbrunn; Gersthofen
- Area: 1,269.7 km^{2}

Current electoral district
- Created: 1949
- Party: CSU
- Member: Hansjörg Durz
- Elected: 2013, 2017, 2021, 2025

Augsburg-Land is an electoral constituency (German: Wahlkreis) represented in the Bundestag. It elects one member via first-past-the-post voting. Under the current constituency numbering system, it is designated as constituency 252. It is located in southwestern Bavaria, comprising most of the Landkreis Augsburg and Aichach-Friedberg districts.

Augsburg-Land was created for the inaugural 1949 federal election. Since 2013, it has been represented by Hansjörg Durz of the Christian Social Union (CSU).

== Geography ==
Augsburg-Land is located in southwestern Bavaria. As of the 2025 federal election, it comprises most of the Landkreis Augsburg district excluding the municipalities of Fischach, Graben, and Schwabmünchen and the Verwaltungsgemeinschaften of Großaitingen, Langerringen, Lechfeld, and Stauden; as well as the municipalities of Affing, Aichach, Friedberg, Hollenbach, Kissing, Merching, Rehling, and Ried and the Verwaltungsgemeinschaften of Dasing and Mering from the Aichach-Friedberg district.

== History ==
Augsburg-Land was created in 1949. In the 1949 election, it was Bavaria constituency 42 in the numbering system. In the 1953 through 1961 elections, it was number 237. In the 1965 through 1998 elections, it was number 239. In the 2002 and 2005 elections, it was number 254. Since the 2009 election, it has been number 253.

Originally, the constituency comprised the districts of Landkreis Augsburg, Friedberg, Krumbach, and Wertingen. In the 1965 through 1972 elections, it lost the Krumbach district while gaining the Schwabmünchen district. In the 1976 through 1994 elections, it comprised the districts of Landkreis Augsburg and Aichach-Friedberg. In the 1998 election, it lost the municipality of Königsbrunn from Landkreis Augsburg as well as the municipality of Inchenhofen and the Verwaltungsgemeinschaften of Kühbach and Pöttmes from the Aichach-Friedberg district. In the 2005 election, it further lost the Verwaltungsgemeinschaft of Aindling. In the 2021 election, it lost the municipality of Altenmünster from Landkreis Augsburg. Ahead of the 2025 election, the constituency was reconfigured to its current boundaries.

| Election | No. | Name | Borders |
|---|---|---|---|
| 1949 | 42 | Augsburg-Land | Landkreis Augsburg district; Friedberg district; Krumbach district; Wertingen district |
| 1953 | 237 | Augsburg-Land | Landkreis Augsburg district; Friedberg district; Krumbach district; Wertingen district |
| 1957 | 237 | Augsburg-Land | Landkreis Augsburg district; Friedberg district; Krumbach district; Wertingen district |
| 1961 | 237 | Augsburg-Land | Landkreis Augsburg district; Friedberg district; Krumbach district; Wertingen district |
| 1965 | 239 | Augsburg-Land | Landkreis Augsburg district; Friedberg district; Schwabmünchen district; Wertingen district |
| 1969 | 239 | Augsburg-Land | Landkreis Augsburg district; Friedberg district; Schwabmünchen district; Wertingen district |
| 1972 | 239 | Augsburg-Land | Landkreis Augsburg district; Friedberg district; Schwabmünchen district; Wertingen district |
| 1976 | 239 | Augsburg-Land | Landkreis Augsburg district; Aichach-Friedberg district |
| 1980 | 239 | Augsburg-Land | Landkreis Augsburg district; Aichach-Friedberg district |
| 1983 | 239 | Augsburg-Land | Landkreis Augsburg district; Aichach-Friedberg district |
| 1987 | 239 | Augsburg-Land | Landkreis Augsburg district; Aichach-Friedberg district |
| 1990 | 239 | Augsburg-Land | Landkreis Augsburg district; Aichach-Friedberg district |
| 1994 | 239 | Augsburg-Land | Landkreis Augsburg district; Aichach-Friedberg district |
| 1998 | 239 | Augsburg-Land | Landkreis Augsburg district (excluding Königsbrunn municipality); Aichach-Friedberg district (excluding Inchenhofen municipality and Kühbach and Pöttmes Verwaltungsgemeinschaften) |
| 2002 | 254 | Augsburg-Land | Landkreis Augsburg district (excluding Königsbrunn municipality); Aichach-Friedberg district (excluding Inchenhofen municipality and Kühbach and Pöttmes Verwaltungsgemeinschaften) |
| 2005 | 254 | Augsburg-Land | Landkreis Augsburg district (excluding Königsbrunn municipality); Aichach-Friedberg district (excluding Inchenhofen municipality and Aindling, Kühbach, and Pöttmes Verwaltungsgemeinschaften) |
| 2009 | 253 | Augsburg-Land | Landkreis Augsburg district (excluding Königsbrunn municipality); Aichach-Friedberg district (excluding Inchenhofen municipality and Aindling, Kühbach, and Pöttmes Verwaltungsgemeinschaften) |
| 2013 | 253 | Augsburg-Land | Landkreis Augsburg district (excluding Königsbrunn municipality); Aichach-Friedberg district (excluding Inchenhofen municipality and Aindling, Kühbach, and Pöttmes Verwaltungsgemeinschaften) |
| 2017 | 253 | Augsburg-Land | Landkreis Augsburg district (excluding Königsbrunn municipality); Aichach-Friedberg district (excluding Inchenhofen municipality and Aindling, Kühbach, and Pöttmes Verwaltungsgemeinschaften) |
| 2021 | 253 | Augsburg-Land | Landkreis Augsburg district (excluding Altenmünster and Königsbrunn municipalities); Aichach-Friedberg district (excluding Inchenhofen municipality and Aindling, Kühbach, and Pöttmes Verwaltungsgemeinschaften) |
| 2025 | 252 | Augsburg-Land | Landkreis Augsburg district (excluding Fischach, Graben, and Schwabmünchen municipalities and Großaitingen, Langerringen, Lechfeld, and Stauden Verwaltungsgemeinschaften); Aichach-Friedberg district (only Affing, Aichach, Friedberg, Hollenbach, Kissing, Merching, Rehling, and Ried municipalities and Dasing and Mering Verwaltungsgemeinschaften) |

== Members ==
The constituency has been held continuously by the Christian Social Union (CSU) since its creation. It was first represented by Josef Oesterle from 1949 to 1961, followed by Walter Althammer from 1961 to 1987. Eduard Oswald was representative from 1987 to 2013. Hansjörg Durz was elected in 2013, and re-elected in 2017, 2021, and 2025.

| Election | Member | Party | % |
|---|---|---|---|
| 1949 | Josef Oesterle | CSU | 39.6 |
| 1953 | Josef Oesterle | CSU | 56.3 |
| 1957 | Josef Oesterle | CSU | 63.6 |
| 1961 | Walter Althammer | CSU | 58.6 |
| 1965 | Walter Althammer | CSU | 60.6 |
| 1969 | Walter Althammer | CSU | 59.9 |
| 1972 | Walter Althammer | CSU | 62.8 |
| 1976 | Walter Althammer | CSU | 68.1 |
| 1980 | Walter Althammer | CSU | 66.4 |
| 1983 | Walter Althammer | CSU | 69.9 |
| 1987 | Eduard Oswald | CSU | 64.5 |
| 1990 | Eduard Oswald | CSU | 59.5 |
| 1994 | Eduard Oswald | CSU | 58.3 |
| 1998 | Eduard Oswald | CSU | 58.1 |
| 2002 | Eduard Oswald | CSU | 65.3 |
| 2005 | Eduard Oswald | CSU | 59.9 |
| 2009 | Eduard Oswald | CSU | 53.0 |
| 2013 | Hansjörg Durz | CSU | 60.6 |
| 2017 | Hansjörg Durz | CSU | 47.8 |
| 2021 | Hansjörg Durz | CSU | 40.6 |
| 2025 | Hansjörg Durz | CSU | 44.5 |

== Election results ==
=== 2025 election ===
Federal election (2025): Augsburg-Land
| Notes: | Blue background denotes the winner of the electorate vote. Pink background denotes a candidate elected from their party list. Yellow background denotes an electorate win by a list member, or other incumbent. A ✓ or ✗ denotes status of any incumbent, win or lose respectively. | | | | | | |
| Party | Candidate | Votes | % | ±% | Party votes | % | ±% |
|---|---|---|---|---|---|---|---|
| CSU | ✓ Hansjörg Durz | 88,361 | 44.5 | ▲4.2 | 79,039 | 39.7 | ▲6.7 |
| AfD | Gabrielle Mailbeck | 37,562 | 18.9 | ▲9.3 | 38,629 | 19.4 | ▲9.9 |
| SPD | Heike Heubach | 25,217 | 12.7 | ▼2.2 | 21,263 | 10.7 | ▼6.1 |
| Greens | Helmut Horst-Werner Schmidt | 18,277 | 9.2 | ▼3.2 | 21,838 | 11.0 | ▼2.0 |
| FW | Otmar Krumpholz | 10,256 | 5.2 | ▼4.0 | 9,325 | 4.7 | ▼3.2 |
| Left | Markus Rainer Reinthaler | 7,841 | 3.9 | ▲2.1 | 9,555 | 4.8 | ▲2.7 |
| FDP | Dr. Brigit Geier | 5,509 | 2.8 | ▼4.9 | 7,946 | 4.0 | ▼7.0 |
| BSW | | | | | 5,852 | 2.9 | |
| APT | | | | | 1,443 | 0.7 | ▼0.4 |
| ÖDP | Johann Wolfgang Grönninger | 2,116 | 1.1 | ▼0.4 | 863 | 0.4 | ▼0.2 |
| dieBasis | Andreas Emil Rudolf Kahnt | 1,969 | 1.0 | ▼1.3 | 1,002 | 0.5 | ▼1.5 |
| PARTEI | | | | | 793 | 0.4 | ▼0.3 |
| Volt | Konstantin Riegel | 1,479 | 0.7 | ▲0.7 | 777 | 0.4 | ▲0.2 |
| BP | | | | | 300 | 0.2 | ▼0.3 |
| BD | | | | | 145 | 0.1 | |
| Humanists | | | | | 120 | 0.1 | Steady |
| MLPD | | | | | 42 | 0.0 | Steady |
| Informal votes | | 985 | | | 640 | | |
| Total valid votes | | 198,587 | | | 198,932 | | |
| Turnout | | 199,572 | 86.3 | ▲4.4 | | | |
| CSU hold | Majority | 50,799 | 25.6 | ▼0.5 | | | |

=== 2021 election ===
Federal election (2021): Augsburg-Land
| Notes: | Blue background denotes the winner of the electorate vote. Pink background denotes a candidate elected from their party list. Yellow background denotes an electorate win by a list member, or other incumbent. A ✓ or ✗ denotes status of any incumbent, win or lose respectively. | | | | | | |
| Party | Candidate | Votes | % | ±% | Party votes | % | ±% |
|---|---|---|---|---|---|---|---|
| CSU | ✓ Hansjörg Durz | 82,423 | 40.6 | ▼7.1 | 67,883 | 33.3 | ▼8.0 |
| SPD | Heike Heubach | 29,435 | 14.5 | ▲0.3 | 33,405 | 16.4 | ▲3.6 |
| Greens | Stefan Lindauer | 24,806 | 12.2 | ▲4.7 | 26,207 | 12.9 | ▲4.0 |
| AfD | Rainer Kraft | 19,660 | 9.7 | ▼2.7 | 19,481 | 9.6 | ▼4.1 |
| FW | Marina Jakob | 19,230 | 9.5 | ▲2.9 | 16,595 | 8.1 | ▲4.9 |
| FDP | Matthias Krause | 16,032 | 7.9 | ▲1.8 | 22,301 | 10.9 | ▲0.5 |
| dieBasis | Alexander Denner | 4,693 | 2.3 | | 4,239 | 2.1 | |
| Left | Cengiz Tuncer | 3,573 | 1.8 | ▼1.9 | 4,176 | 2.1 | ▼2.9 |
| Tierschutzpartei | | | | | 2,250 | 1.1 | ▲0.1 |
| ÖDP | Thomas Lidl | 3,100 | 1.5 | ▼0.4 | 1,387 | 0.7 | ▼0.3 |
| PARTEI | | | | | 1,318 | 0.6 | ▲0.1 |
| BP | | | | | 949 | 0.5 | ▼0.3 |
| Pirates | | | | | 600 | 0.3 | ▼0.1 |
| Team Todenhöfer | | | | | 540 | 0.3 | |
| Unabhängige | | | | | 482 | 0.2 | |
| Volt | | | | | 432 | 0.2 | |
| V-Partei3 | | | | | 384 | 0.2 | ▼0.1 |
| Gesundheitsforschung | | | | | 245 | 0.1 | 0.0 |
| Bündnis C | | | | | 181 | 0.1 | |
| Humanists | | | | | 160 | 0.1 | |
| NPD | | | | | 143 | 0.1 | ▼0.2 |
| Independent | Sami Baydar | 135 | 0.1 | | | | |
| du. | | | | | 98 | 0.0 | |
| The III. Path | | | | | 81 | 0.0 | |
| MLPD | | | | | 46 | 0.0 | 0.0 |
| DKP | | | | | 43 | 0.0 | 0.0 |
| LKR | | | | | 41 | 0.0 | |
| Informal votes | | 1,650 | | | 1,070 | | |
| Total valid votes | | 203,087 | | | 203,667 | | |
| Turnout | | 204,737 | 82.1 | ▲2.1 | | | |
| CSU hold | Majority | 52,988 | 26.1 | ▼7.4 | | | |

=== 2017 election ===
Federal election (2017): Augsburg-Land
| Notes: | Blue background denotes the winner of the electorate vote. Pink background denotes a candidate elected from their party list. Yellow background denotes an electorate win by a list member, or other incumbent. A ✓ or ✗ denotes status of any incumbent, win or lose respectively. | | | | | | |
| Party | Candidate | Votes | % | ±% | Party votes | % | ±% |
|---|---|---|---|---|---|---|---|
| CSU | ✓ Hansjörg Durz | 94,252 | 47.8 | ▼12.8 | 81,831 | 41.4 | ▼12.3 |
| SPD | Herbert Woerlein | 27,813 | 14.1 | ▼3.6 | 25,240 | 12.8 | ▼4.5 |
| AfD | Rainer Kraft | 24,279 | 12.3 | ▲7.8 | 27,045 | 13.7 | ▲8.5 |
| Greens | Franz Bossek | 14,809 | 7.5 | ▲0.6 | 17,447 | 8.8 | ▲1.6 |
| FW | Markus Brem | 13,080 | 6.6 | | 6,579 | 3.3 | ▲1.1 |
| FDP | Karlheinz Faller | 11,976 | 6.1 | ▲3.8 | 20,565 | 10.4 | ▲5.7 |
| Left | Cengiz Tuncer | 7,231 | 3.7 | ▲0.7 | 9,737 | 4.9 | ▲1.7 |
| ÖDP | Constanze von Simmelsdorf | 3,823 | 1.9 | ▲0.4 | 1,941 | 1.0 | 0.0 |
| BP | | | | | 1,494 | 0.8 | ▼0.1 |
| PARTEI | | | | | 1,092 | 0.6 | |
| Pirates | | | | | 722 | 0.4 | ▼1.4 |
| NPD | | | | | 533 | 0.3 | ▼0.5 |
| V-Partei³ | | | | | 483 | 0.2 | |
| DM | | | | | 363 | 0.2 | |
| Gesundheitsforschung | | | | | 262 | 0.1 | |
| DiB | | | | | 261 | 0.1 | |
| BGE | | | | | 239 | 0.1 | |
| MLPD | | | | | 46 | 0.0 | 0.0 |
| BüSo | | | | | 31 | 0.0 | 0.0 |
| DKP | | | | | 28 | 0.0 | |
| Informal votes | | 1,814 | | | 1,231 | | |
| Total valid votes | | 197,263 | | | 197,846 | | |
| Turnout | | 199,077 | 80.0 | ▲7.8 | | | |
| CSU hold | Majority | 66,439 | 33.7 | ▼9.2 | | | |

=== 2013 election ===
Federal election (2013): Augsburg-Land
| Notes: | Blue background denotes the winner of the electorate vote. Pink background denotes a candidate elected from their party list. Yellow background denotes an electorate win by a list member, or other incumbent. A ✓ or ✗ denotes status of any incumbent, win or lose respectively. | | | | | | |
| Party | Candidate | Votes | % | ±% | Party votes | % | ±% |
|---|---|---|---|---|---|---|---|
| CSU | Hansjörg Durz | 105,841 | 60.6 | ▲7.6 | 93,973 | 53.7 | ▲7.9 |
| SPD | Bernd Bante | 30,879 | 17.7 | ▲2.0 | 30,126 | 17.2 | ▲2.7 |
| Greens | Claudia Eser-Schuberth | 12,067 | 6.9 | ▼1.7 | 12,670 | 7.2 | ▼2.1 |
| AfD | Hermann Mayer | 7,912 | 4.5 | | 9,040 | 5.2 | |
| Left | Daniel Böck | 5,177 | 3.0 | ▼1.8 | 5,631 | 3.2 | ▼2.2 |
| FDP | Johannes Pabst | 3,974 | 2.3 | ▼9.3 | 8,134 | 4.6 | ▼11.1 |
| FW | | | | | 3,929 | 2.2 | |
| Pirates | Hans-Jürgen Rigl | 3,550 | 2.0 | | 3,089 | 1.8 | ▼0.2 |
| ÖDP | Dieter Nießner | 2,665 | 1.5 | ▼0.1 | 1,784 | 1.0 | 0.0 |
| BP | | | | | 1,580 | 0.9 | 0.0 |
| Tierschutzpartei | | | | | 1,384 | 0.8 | ▲0.1 |
| NPD | Karl-Heinz Kügle | 1,840 | 1.1 | ▼0.6 | 1,279 | 0.7 | ▼0.5 |
| REP | | | | | 1,023 | 0.6 | ▼0.4 |
| DIE FRAUEN | | | | | 390 | 0.2 | |
| RRP | | 734 | 0.4 | ▼1.0 | 367 | 0.2 | ▼0.9 |
| DIE VIOLETTEN | | | | | 221 | 0.1 | ▼0.1 |
| Party of Reason | | | | | 168 | 0.1 | |
| PRO | | | | | 151 | 0.1 | |
| MLPD | | | | | 42 | 0.0 | 0.0 |
| BüSo | | | | | 29 | 0.0 | ▼0.1 |
| Informal votes | | 1,600 | | | 1,229 | | |
| Total valid votes | | 174,639 | | | 175,010 | | |
| Turnout | | 176,239 | 72.2 | ▼1.4 | | | |
| CSU hold | Majority | 74,962 | 42.9 | ▲5.6 | | | |

=== 2009 election ===
Federal election (2009): Augsburg-Land
| Notes: | Blue background denotes the winner of the electorate vote. Pink background denotes a candidate elected from their party list. Yellow background denotes an electorate win by a list member, or other incumbent. A ✓ or ✗ denotes status of any incumbent, win or lose respectively. | | | | | | |
| Party | Candidate | Votes | % | ±% | Party votes | % | ±% |
|---|---|---|---|---|---|---|---|
| CSU | ✓ Eduard Oswald | 92,508 | 53.0 | ▼6.9 | 80,335 | 45.8 | ▼7.1 |
| SPD | Maria Hackl | 27,427 | 15.7 | ▼6.5 | 25,356 | 14.5 | ▼7.6 |
| FDP | Erwin Lotter | 20,137 | 11.5 | ▲5.8 | 27,522 | 15.7 | ▲5.6 |
| Greens | Heidi Rohrlack | 15,031 | 8.6 | ▲1.6 | 16,430 | 9.4 | ▲1.9 |
| Left | Silvio Heidbüchel | 8,264 | 4.7 | ▲2.1 | 9,425 | 5.4 | ▲2.5 |
| Pirates | | | | | 3,399 | 1.9 | |
| NPD | Karin Hartwig | 2,834 | 1.6 | ▼0.2 | 2,168 | 1.2 | 0.0 |
| ÖDP | Ulrich Hoffmann | 2,804 | 1.6 | | 1,790 | 1.0 | |
| BP | Karl Schedlbauer | 2,552 | 1.5 | | 1,609 | 0.9 | ▲0.4 |
| RRP | Manfred Link | 2,539 | 1.5 | | 1,990 | 1.1 | |
| REP | | | | | 1,777 | 1.0 | ▼0.2 |
| Tierschutzpartei | | | | | 1,208 | 0.7 | |
| FAMILIE | | | | | 1,187 | 0.7 | 0.0 |
| DIE VIOLETTEN | | | | | 405 | 0.2 | |
| PBC | | | | | 200 | 0.1 | ▼0.1 |
| CM | | | | | 191 | 0.1 | |
| BüSo | Ralf Heinrich | 444 | 0.3 | | 122 | 0.1 | 0.0 |
| DVU | | | | | 110 | 0.1 | |
| MLPD | | | | | 46 | 0.0 | 0.0 |
| Informal votes | | 2,484 | | | 1,754 | | |
| Total valid votes | | 174,540 | | | 175,270 | | |
| Turnout | | 177,024 | 73.6 | ▼7.4 | | | |
| CSU hold | Majority | 65,081 | 37.3 | ▼0.4 | | | |

=== 2005 election ===
Federal election (2005):Augsburg-Land
| Notes: | Blue background denotes the winner of the electorate vote. Pink background denotes a candidate elected from their party list. Yellow background denotes an electorate win by a list member, or other incumbent. A ✓ or ✗ denotes status of any incumbent, win or lose respectively. | | | | | | |
| Party | Candidate | Votes | % | ±% | Party votes | % | ±% |
|---|---|---|---|---|---|---|---|
| CSU | ✓ Eduard Oswald | 112,956 | 59.9 | ▼5.1 | 100,308 | 53.0 | ▼9.2 |
| SPD | Helmut Jung | 41,804 | 22.2 | ▼2.7 | 41,717 | 22.0 | ▼1.5 |
| Greens | Hannes Grönninger | 13,159 | 7.0 | ▲0.9 | 14,067 | 7.4 | ▲0.4 |
| FDP | Erwin Lotter | 10,866 | 5.8 | ▲2.6 | 19,169 | 10.1 | ▲5.7 |
| Left | Alexander Süßmair | 5,007 | 2.7 | ▲1.9 | 5,537 | 2.9 | ▲2.4 |
| NPD | Rudolf Rieger | 3,468 | 1.8 | | 2,351 | 1.1 | ▲1.1 |
| REP | | | | | 2,374 | 1.3 | ▲0.4 |
| Independent | Martin Helfer | 1,266 | 0.7 | | | | |
| Familie | | | | | 1,190 | 0.6 | |
| BP | | | | | 947 | 0.5 | ▲0.4 |
| GRAUEN | | | | | 617 | 0.3 | ▲0.2 |
| Feminist | | | | | 491 | 0.3 | ▲0.2 |
| PBC | | | | | 416 | 0.2 | ▲0.1 |
| BüSo | | | | | 144 | 0.1 | ▲0.1 |
| MLPD | | | | | 88 | 0.0 | |
| Informal votes | | 3,051 | | | 2,161 | | |
| Total valid votes | | 188,526 | | | 189,416 | | |
| Turnout | | 191,577 | 81.0 | ▼2.5 | | | |
| CSU hold | Majority | 71,152 | 37.7 | | | | |
