= Graben (Lechfeld) Gewerbepark station =

Railway station in Bavaria

Graben (Lechfeld) Gewerbepark
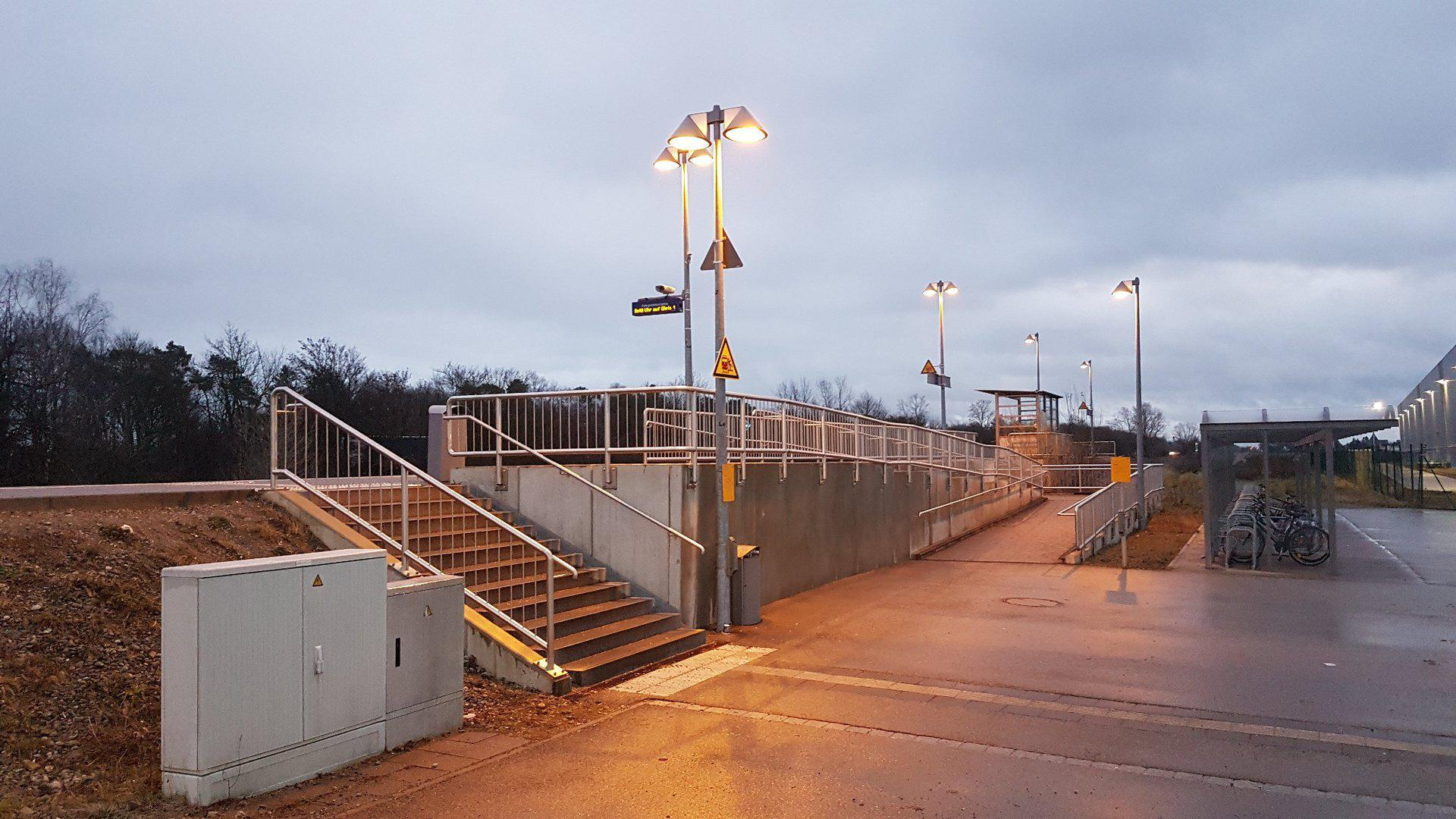
- The station in 2019

General information
- Location: Graben, Bavaria; Germany
- Coordinates: 48°11′57″N 10°51′09″E
- Owner: DB Netz
- Operator: DB Station&Service
- Lines: Bobingen–Landsberg am Lech line (KBS 986)
- Distance: 8.1 km (5.0 mi) from Bobingen
- Platforms: 1 side platform
- Tracks: 1
- Train operators: Bayerische Regiobahn
- Connections: Augsburger Verkehrs- und Tarifverbund buses

Other information
- Station code: 8278
- DS100 code: MGRL
- IBNR: 8002346
- Category: 6

History
- Opened: 21 October 2012

Services
| Preceding station | | Following station |
|---|---|---|
| Oberottmarshausen towards Augsburg Hbf | RB 69 | Lagerlechfeld towards Landsberg (Lech) |
Location

Graben (Lechfeld) Gewerbepark station (German: Bahnhof Graben (Lechfeld) Gewerbepark) is a railway station in the municipality of Graben, in Bavaria, Germany. It is located on the Bobingen–Landsberg am Lech line of Deutsche Bahn. The station opened on 21 October 2012.

== Services ==
As of the December 2021 timetable change, the following services stop at Graben (Lechfeld) Gewerbepark:

- RB: hourly service between Augsburg and Kaufering; some trains continue from Kaufering to Landsberg (Lech).
