= Oberottmarshausen station =

Railway station in Bavaria

Oberottmarshausen
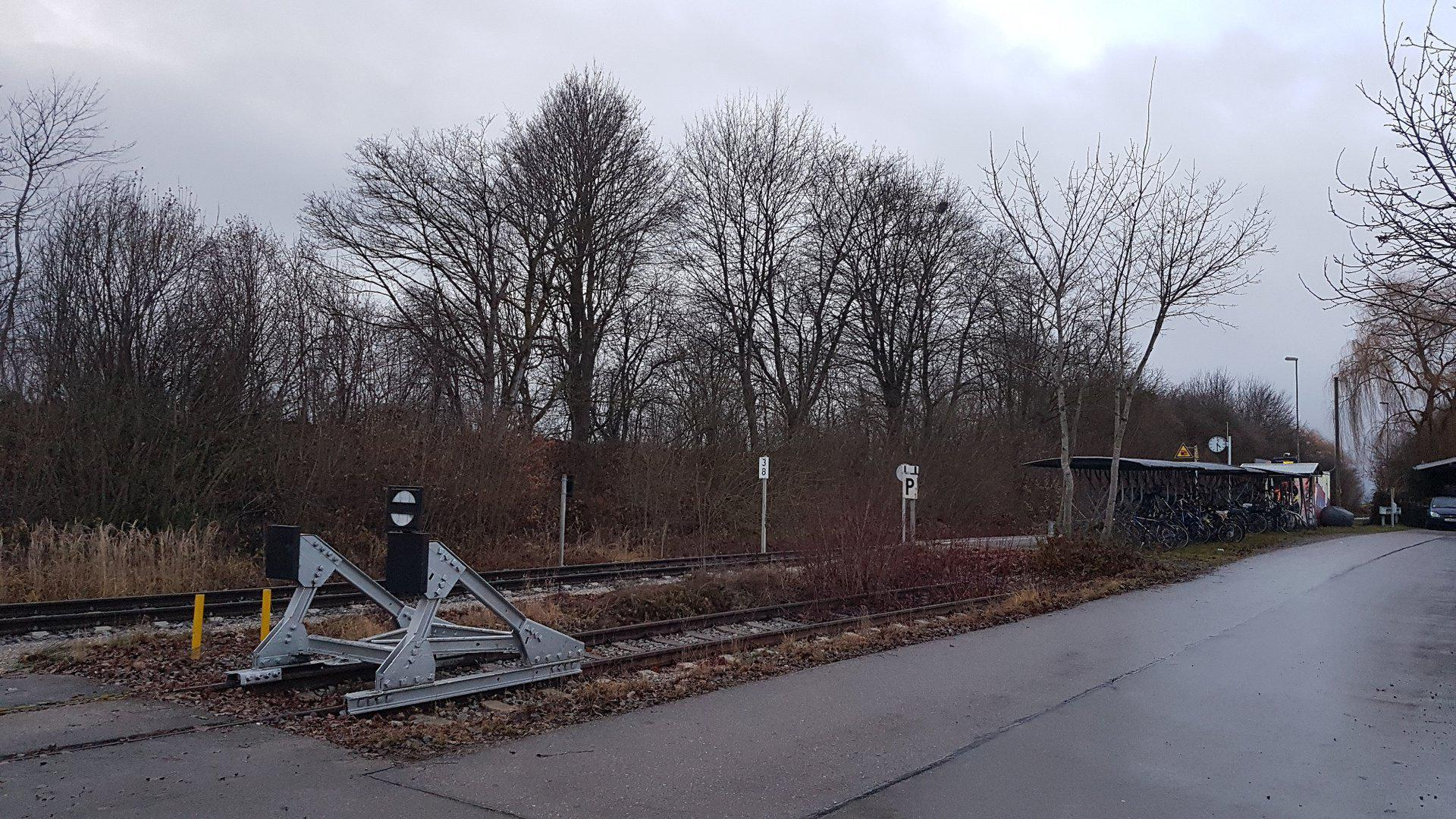
- The station in 2019

General information
- Location: Oberottmarshausen, Bavaria; Germany
- Coordinates: 48°14′09″N 10°51′06″E
- Owner: DB Netz
- Operator: DB Station&Service
- Lines: Bobingen–Landsberg am Lech line (KBS 986)
- Distance: 3.7 km (2.3 mi) from Bobingen
- Platforms: 1 side platform
- Tracks: 1
- Train operators: Bayerische Regiobahn

Other information
- Station code: 4679
- DS100 code: MOMN
- IBNR: 8004571
- Category: 7

Services
Preceding station		Following station
Bobingen towards Augsburg Hbf	RB 69	Graben (Lechfeld) Gewerbepark towards Landsberg (Lech)
Location

Oberottmarshausen station (German: Bahnhof Oberottmarshausen) is a railway station in the municipality of Oberottmarshausen, in Bavaria, Germany. It is located on the Bobingen–Landsberg am Lech line of Deutsche Bahn.

== Services ==
As of the December 2021 timetable change, the following services stop at Oberottmarshausen:

- RB: hourly service between Augsburg and Kaufering; some trains continue from Kaufering to Landsberg (Lech).
