= Lagerlechfeld station =

Railway station in Bavaria

Lagerlechfeld
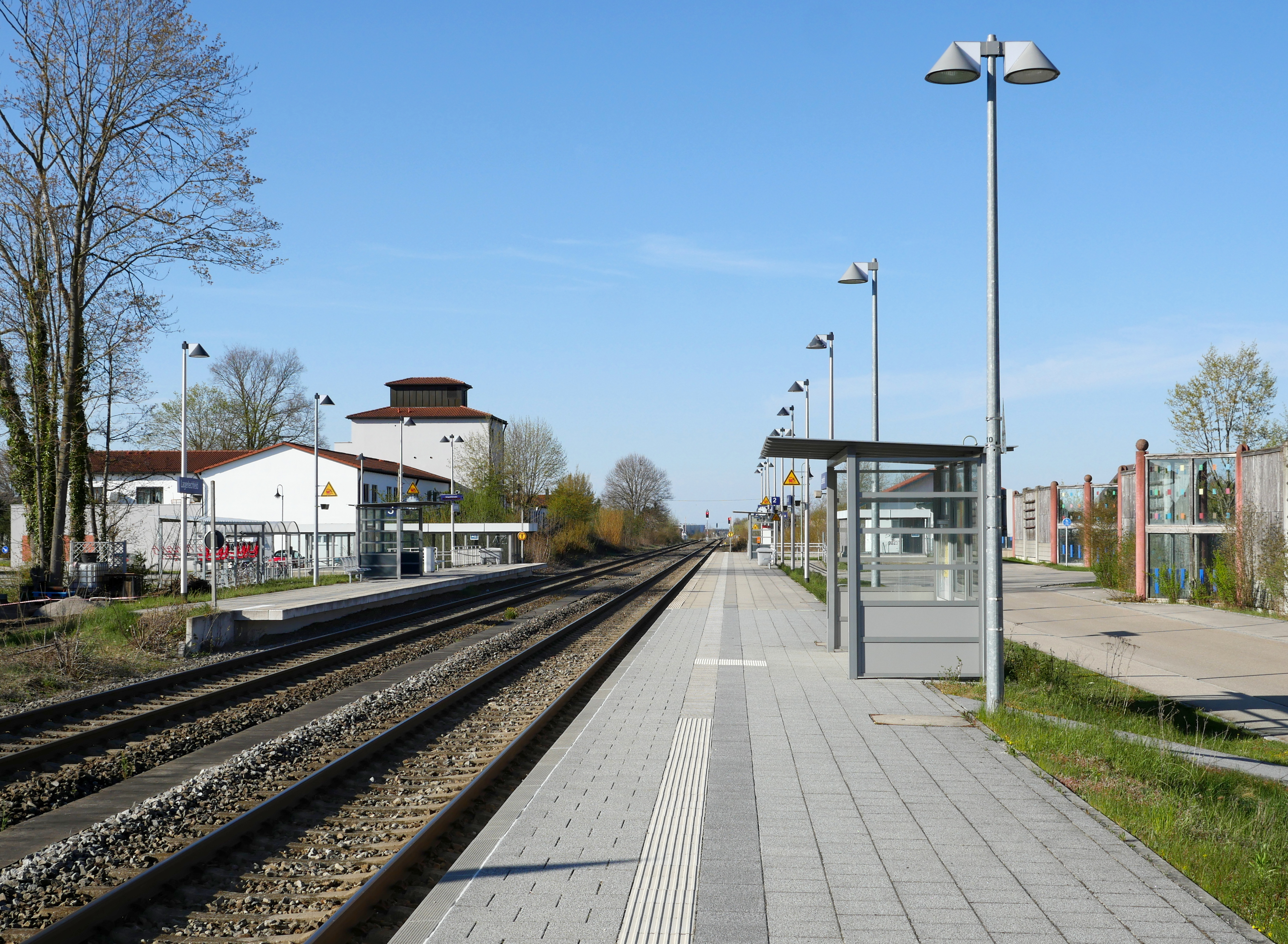
- The station in 2021

General information
- Location: Graben, Bavaria; Germany
- Coordinates: 48°10′58″N 10°50′39″E
- Owner: DB Netz
- Operator: DB Station&Service
- Lines: Bobingen–Landsberg am Lech line (KBS 986)
- Distance: 9.9 km (6.2 mi) from Bobingen
- Platforms: 2 side platforms
- Tracks: 2
- Train operators: Bayerische Regiobahn
- Connections: Augsburger Verkehrs- und Tarifverbund buses

Other information
- Station code: 3491
- DS100 code: MLLF
- IBNR: 8003490
- Category: 6

Services
| Preceding station | | Following station |
|---|---|---|
| Graben (Lechfeld) Gewerbepark towards Augsburg Hbf | RB 69 | Klosterlechfeld towards Landsberg (Lech) |
Location

Lagerlechfeld station (German: Bahnhof Lagerlechfeld) is a railway station in the municipality of Graben, in Bavaria, Germany. It is located on the Bobingen–Landsberg am Lech line of Deutsche Bahn.

== Services ==
As of the December 2021 timetable change, the following services stop at Lagerlechfeld:

- RB: hourly service between Augsburg and Kaufering; some trains continue from Kaufering to Landsberg (Lech).
