= Klosterlechfeld station =

Railway station in Bavaria

Klosterlechfeld
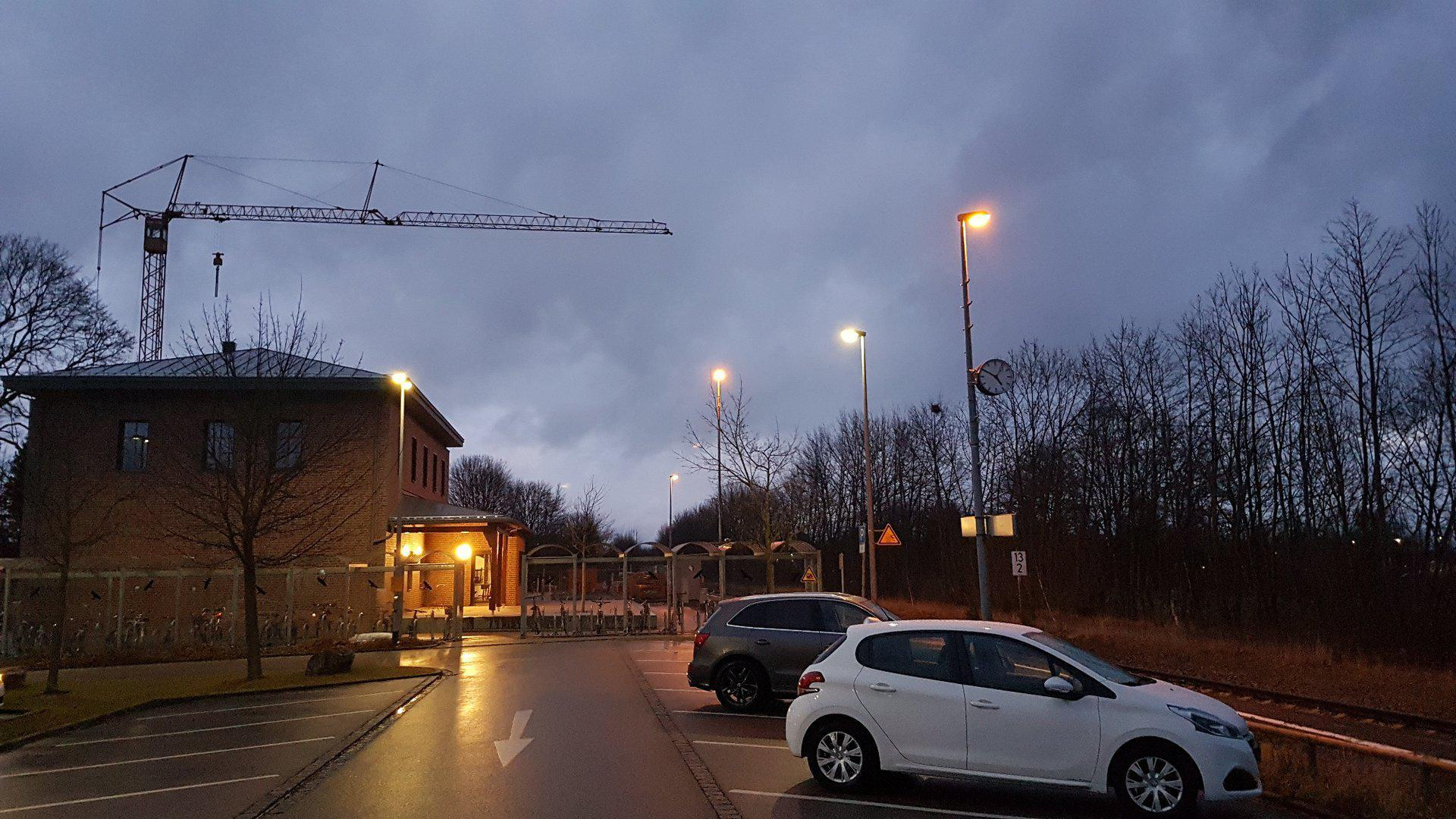
- The station in 2019

General information
- Location: Klosterlechfeld, Bavaria; Germany
- Coordinates: 48°09′19″N 10°49′57″E
- Owner: DB Netz
- Operator: DB Station&Service
- Lines: Bobingen–Landsberg am Lech line (KBS 986)
- Distance: 13.2 km (8.2 mi) from Bobingen
- Platforms: 1 side platform
- Tracks: 1
- Train operators: Bayerische Regiobahn
- Connections: Augsburger Verkehrs- und Tarifverbund and Landsberger Verkehrsgemeinschaft buses

Other information
- Station code: 3284
- DS100 code: MKLF
- IBNR: 8003342
- Category: 6

Services
Preceding station		Following station
Lagerlechfeld towards Augsburg Hbf	RB 69	Kaufering towards Landsberg (Lech)
Location

Klosterlechfeld station (German: Bahnhof Klosterlechfeld) is a railway station in the municipality of Klosterlechfeld, in Bavaria, Germany. It is located on the Bobingen–Landsberg am Lech line of Deutsche Bahn.

== Services ==
As of the December 2021 timetable change, the following services stop at Klosterlechfeld:

- RB: hourly service between Augsburg and Kaufering; some trains continue from Kaufering to Landsberg (Lech).
