= Landsberg (Lech) Schule station =

Railway station in Bavaria

Landsberg (Lech) Schule
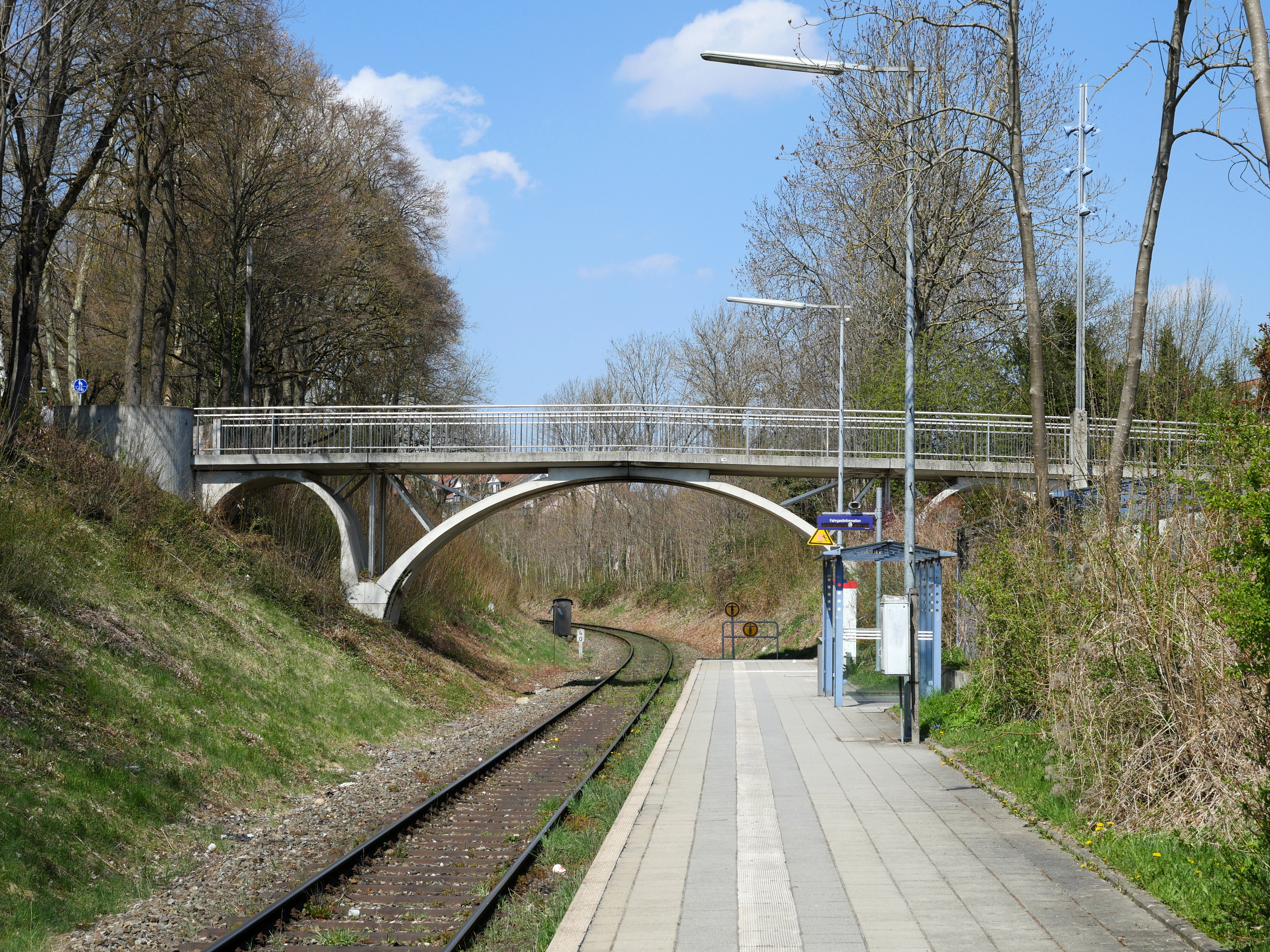
- The station in 2021

General information
- Location: Landsberg am Lech, Bavaria; Germany
- Coordinates: 48°03′15″N 10°52′11″E
- Owner: DB Netz
- Operator: DB Station&Service
- Lines: Bobingen–Landsberg am Lech line (KBS 986)
- Distance: 4.0 km (2.5 mi) from Kaufering
- Platforms: 1 side platform
- Tracks: 1
- Train operators: Bayerische Regiobahn

Other information
- Station code: 3510
- DS100 code: MLLS
- IBNR: 8005389
- Category: 6

Services
Preceding station		Following station
Kaufering towards Augsburg Hbf	RB 69	Landsberg (Lech) Terminus
Location

Landsberg (Lech) Schule station (German: Haltepunkt Landsberg (Lech) Schule) is a railway station in the municipality of Landsberg am Lech, in Bavaria, Germany. It is located on the Bobingen–Landsberg am Lech line of Deutsche Bahn.

== Services ==
As of the December 2021 timetable change, the following services stop at Landsberg (Lech) Schule:

- RB: half-hourly service between Landsberg (Lech) and Kaufering; some trains continue from Kaufering to Augsburg.
