= Eduard Oswald =

German politician

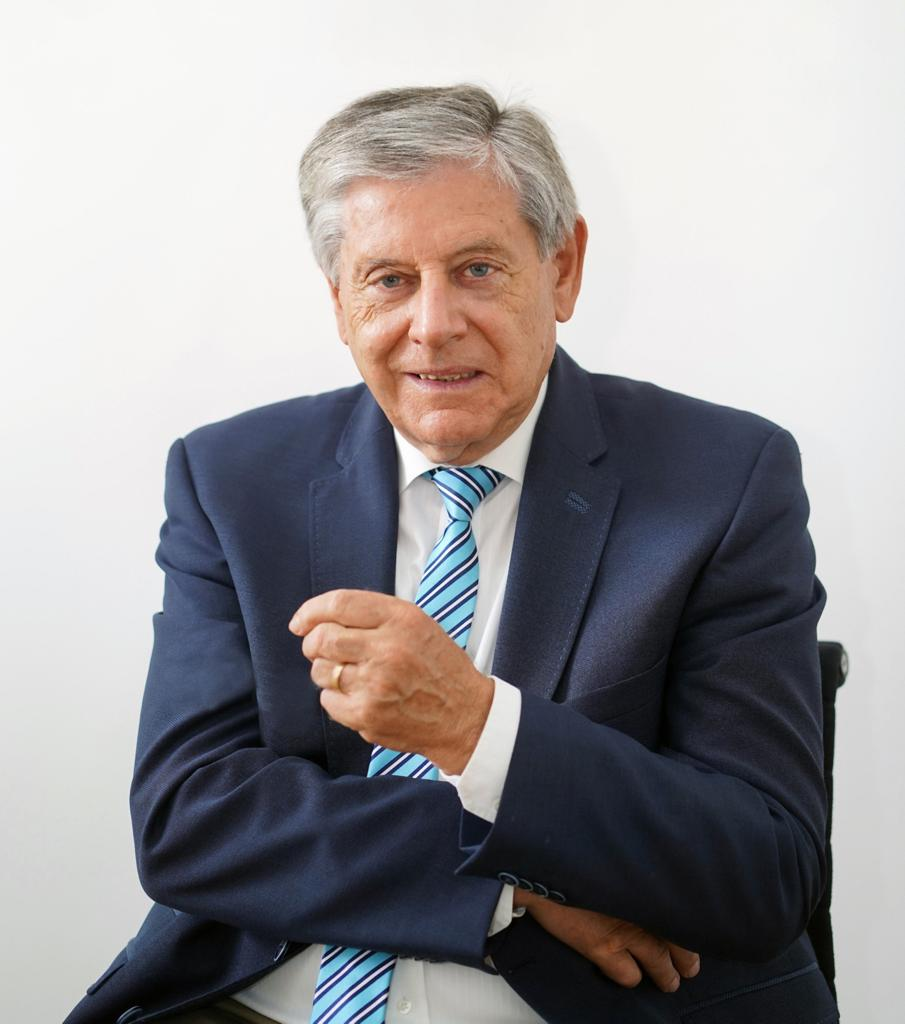
- Oswald in 2021

Vice President of the Bundestag (on proposal of the CDU/CSU faction)
- In office 23 March 2011 – 22 October 2013
- President: Norbert Lammert
- Preceded by: Gerda Hasselfeldt
- Succeeded by: Johannes Singhammer; Peter Hintze

Minister for Regional Planning, Building and Urban Development
- In office 14 January 1998 – 26 October 1998
- Chancellor: Helmut Kohl
- Preceded by: Klaus Töpfer
- Succeeded by: Franz Müntefering (as Minister for Transport, Building and Housing)

Member of the Bundestag; for Augsburg-Land
- In office 18 February 1987 – 22 October 2013
- Preceded by: Ernst Josef Pöppl
- Succeeded by: Hansjörg Durz

Member of the Landtag of Bavaria; for Augsburg-Land North
- In office 30 October 1978 – 22 October 1986
- Preceded by: Hubert Spiekenheuer
- Succeeded by: Max Strehle

Personal details
- Born: 6 September 1947 (age 79) Augsburg, Germany
- Party: Christian Social Union
- Children: 2
- Education: LMU Munich

Eduard Oswald (born 6 September 1947) is a German politician who served as one of the vice presidents of the German Bundestag from 2011 until 2013. A member of the Christian Social Union, he was nominated by the CDU/CSU parliamentary faction to succeed Gerda Hasselfeldt.

== Political career ==
A member of the CSU since 1966, he was a deputy in the Augsburg county council from 1972 to 1998 and a member of the Bavarian Landtag from 1978 to 1986.

From 1987 until 2013, Oswald was a directly elected member of the Bundestag, representing the constituency of Augsburg-Land in Bavaria. He was a member of the executive committee of the CDU/CSU parliamentary group in the Bundestag and served as its parliamentary secretary from May 1992 to January 1998. In the last Kohl cabinet, he was Federal Minister for Regional Planning, Building and Urban Development. During his tenure before his election as Vice President of the Bundestag he served on several important committees including transport, economics and technology and finance.

== Other activities ==
- Augsburg University of Applied Sciences, member of the board of trustees
