= Oberottmarshausen =

- Municipality
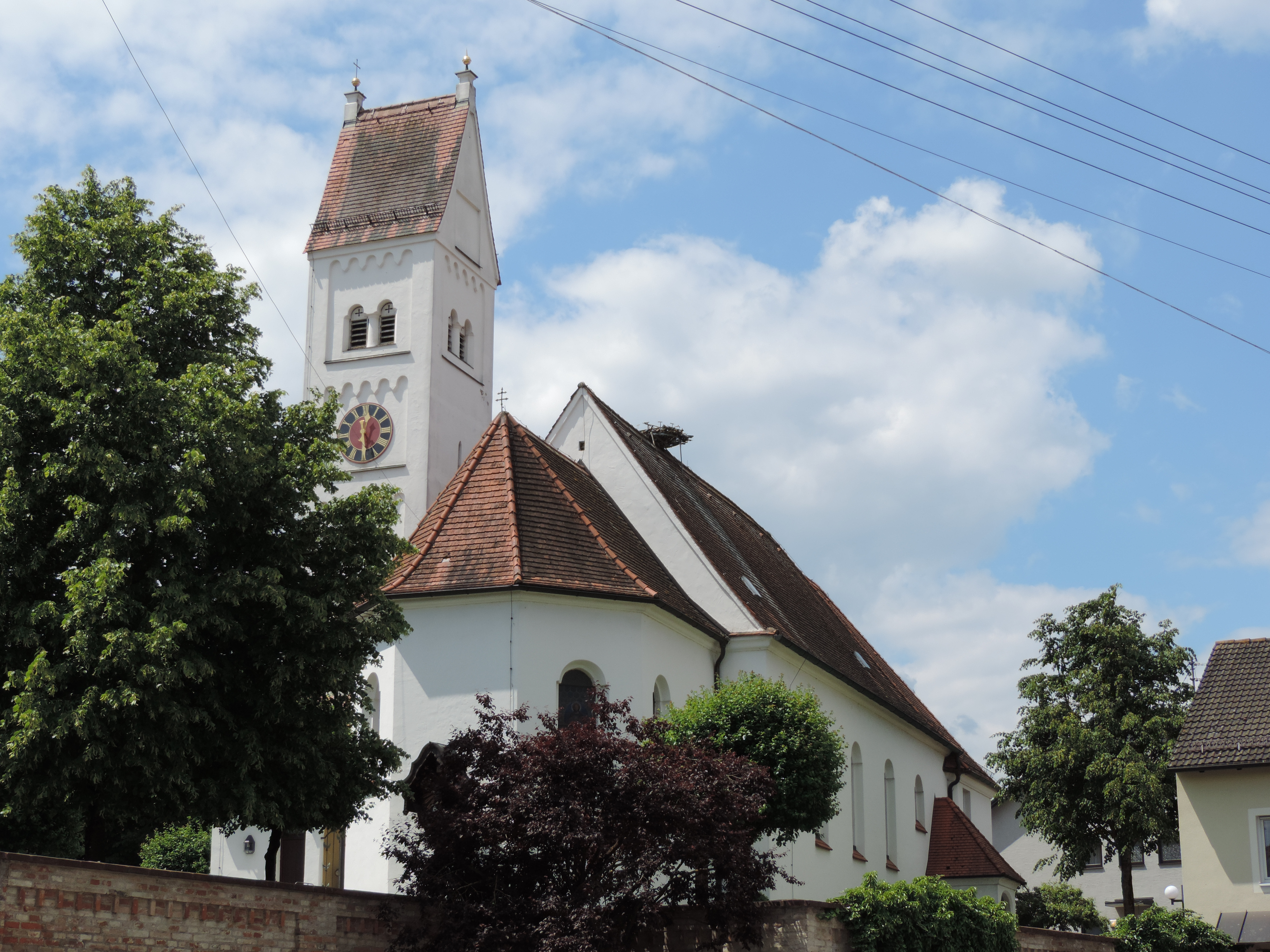
- Church of Saint Vitus

- Coat of arms

- Location of Oberottmarshausen within Augsburg district
- Interactive map of Oberottmarshausen
- Location within Germany Location within Bavaria
- Coordinates: 48°14′N 10°51′E
- Country: Germany
- State: Bavaria
- Admin. region: Schwaben
- District: Augsburg
- Municipal assoc.: Großaitingen

Government
  - Mayor (2020–26): Andreas Reiter

Area
  - Total: 8.60 km^{2} (3.32 sq mi)
- Elevation: 534 m (1,752 ft)

Population (2025-12-31)
  - Total: 1,775
  - Density: 206/km^{2} (535/sq mi)
- Time zone: UTC+01:00 (CET)
  - Summer (DST): UTC+02:00 (CEST)
- Postal codes: 86507
- Dialling codes: 08231
- Vehicle registration: A
- Website: www.oberottmarshausen.de

Oberottmarshausen is a municipality in the district of Augsburg, Bavaria, Germany.

== Transport ==
The municipality has a railway station, Oberottmarshausen, on the Bobingen–Landsberg am Lech line.
