= Graben, Bavaria =

Graben
- Municipality
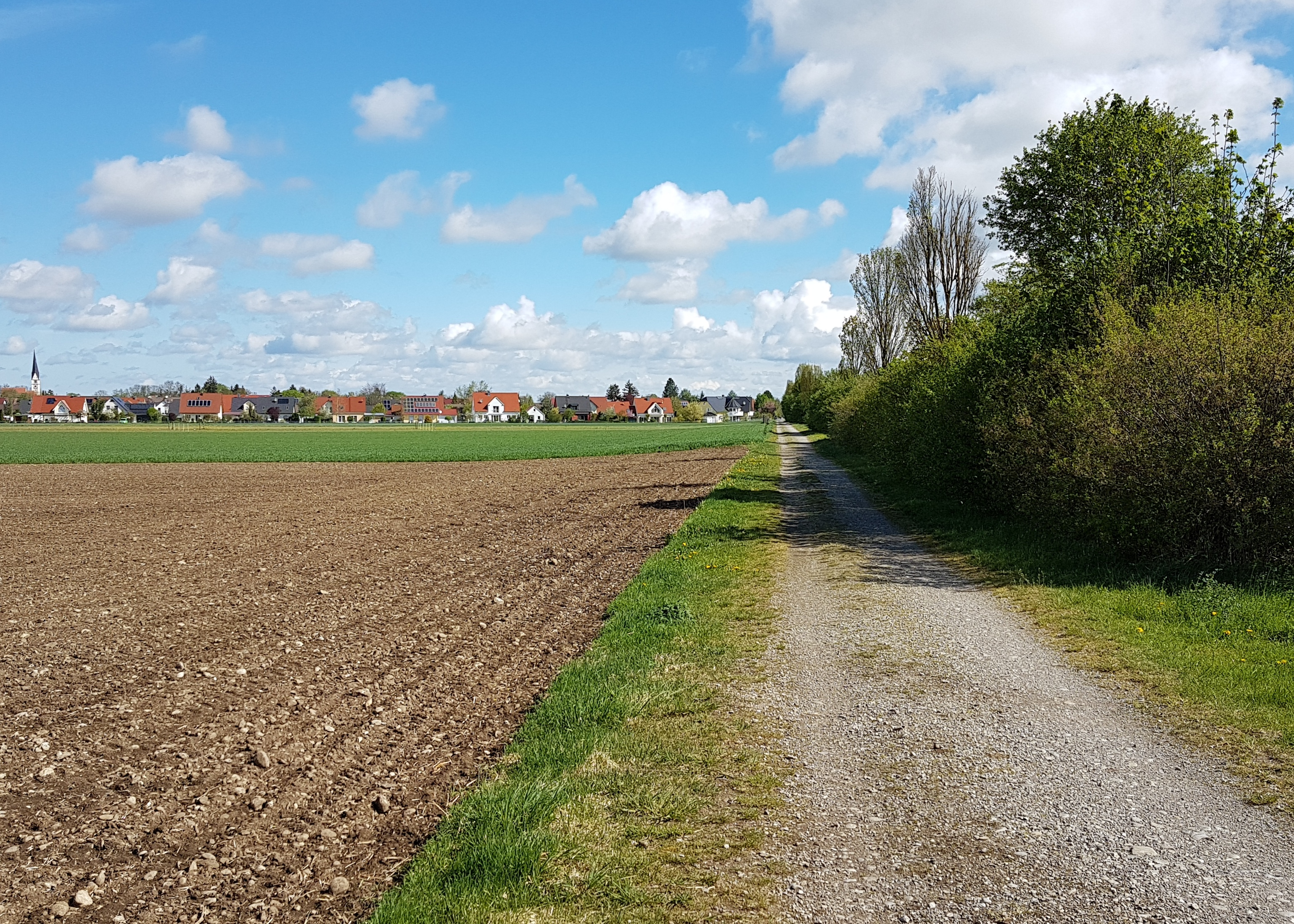
- Via Claudia Augusta at Graben

- Coat of arms

- Location of Graben within Augsburg district
- Interactive map of Graben
- Location within Germany Location within Bavaria
- Coordinates: 48°12′N 10°49′E
- Country: Germany
- State: Bavaria
- Admin. region: Schwaben
- District: Augsburg

Government
  - Mayor (2020–26): Andreas Scharf (CSU)

Area
  - Total: 14.55 km^{2} (5.62 sq mi)
- Elevation: 562 m (1,844 ft)

Population (2025-12-31)
  - Total: 4,040
  - Density: 278/km^{2} (719/sq mi)
- Time zone: UTC+01:00 (CET)
  - Summer (DST): UTC+02:00 (CEST)
- Postal codes: 86836
- Dialling codes: 08232
- Vehicle registration: A
- Website: www.graben.de

Graben (German pronunciation: [ˈɡʁaːbn̩]) is a municipality in the district of Augsburg in Bavaria in Germany.

== Transport ==
The municipality has two railway stations on the Bobingen–Landsberg am Lech line: Lagerlechfeld and Graben (Lechfeld) Gewerbepark.
