= Klosterlechfeld =

- Municipality
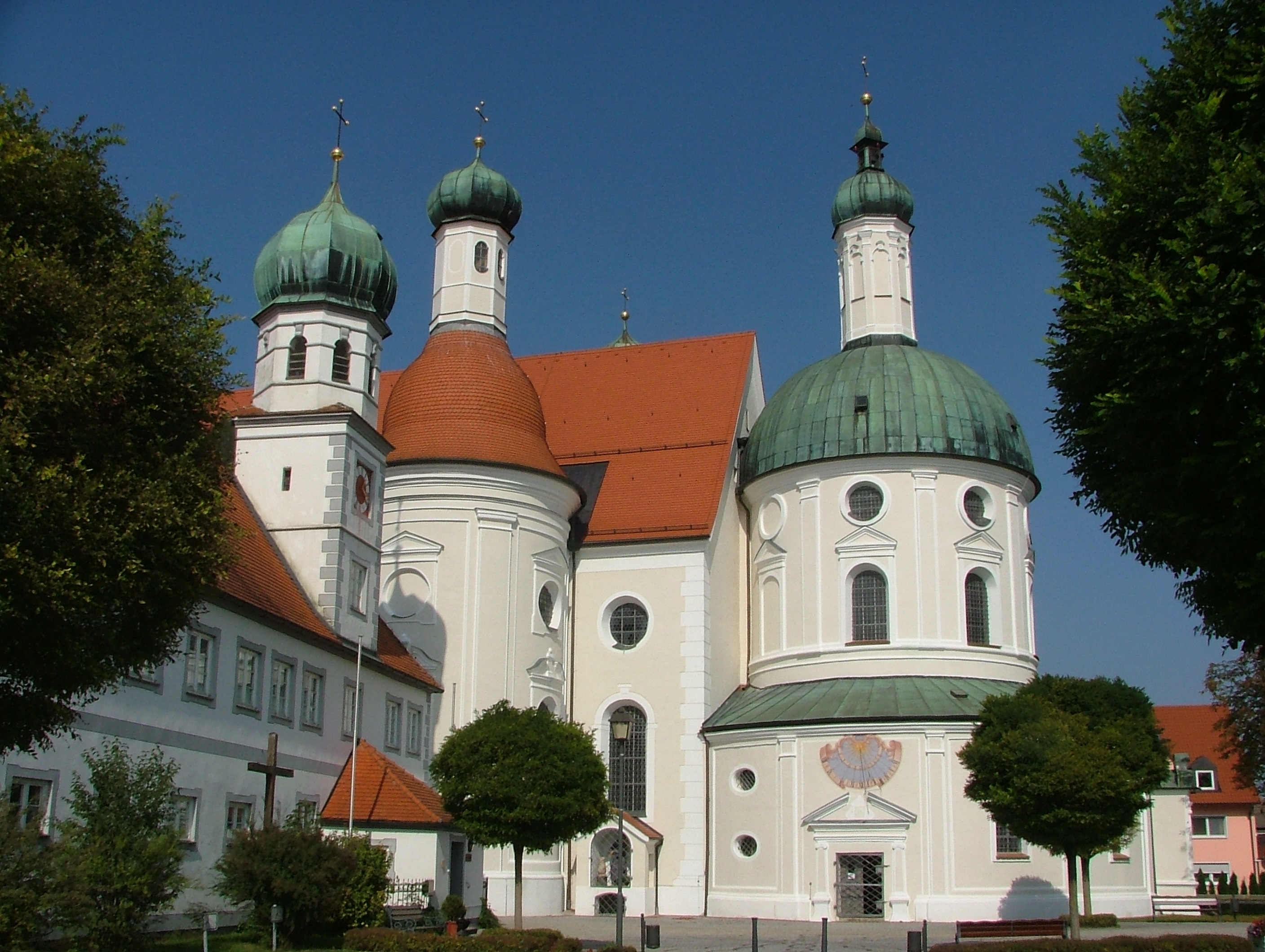
- Pilgrimage Church of Our Lady of Help

- Coat of arms

- Location of Klosterlechfeld within Augsburg district
- Interactive map of Klosterlechfeld
- Location within Germany Location within Bavaria
- Coordinates: 48°10′N 10°49′E
- Country: Germany
- State: Bavaria
- Admin. region: Schwaben
- District: Augsburg
- Municipal assoc.: Lechfeld

Government
  - Mayor (2020–26): Rudolf Schneider (SPD)

Area
  - Total: 2.82 km^{2} (1.09 sq mi)
- Elevation: 561 m (1,841 ft)

Population (2025-12-31)
  - Total: 3,045
  - Density: 1,080/km^{2} (2,800/sq mi)
- Time zone: UTC+01:00 (CET)
  - Summer (DST): UTC+02:00 (CEST)
- Postal codes: 86836
- Dialling codes: 08232
- Vehicle registration: A
- Website: www.klosterlechfeld.de

Klosterlechfeld is a municipality in the district of Augsburg in Bavaria in Germany.

== History ==
What is today the village of Klosterlechfeld developed in the 17th century around the pilgrimage church Maria Hilf (Our Lady Help of Lechfield) and a Franciscan monastery.

In 2016, Klosterlechfeld hosted a famous German TV show called "Shopping Queen", which was seen as a significant success for the city council.

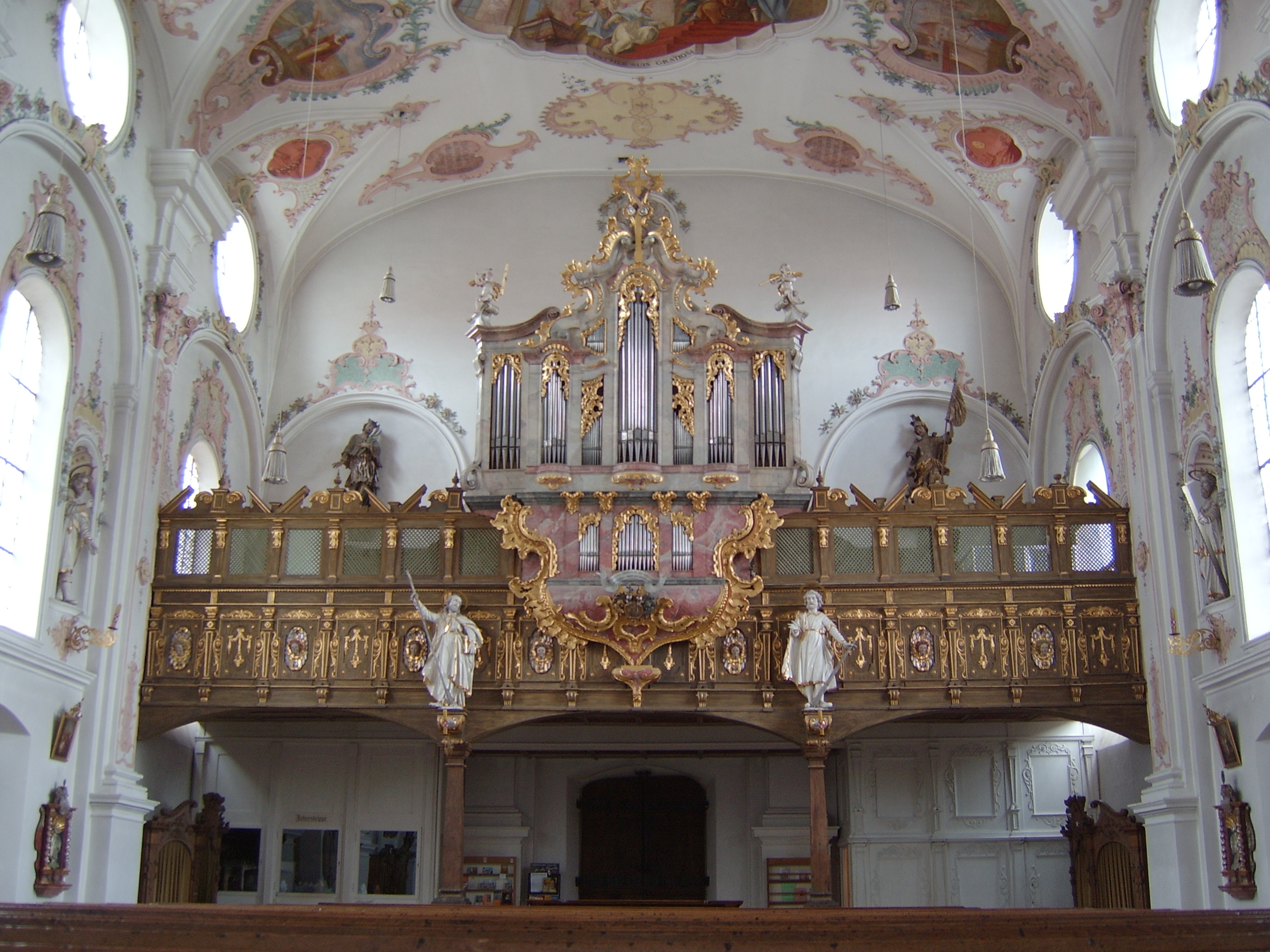
Interior of the Church of Our Lady of Help

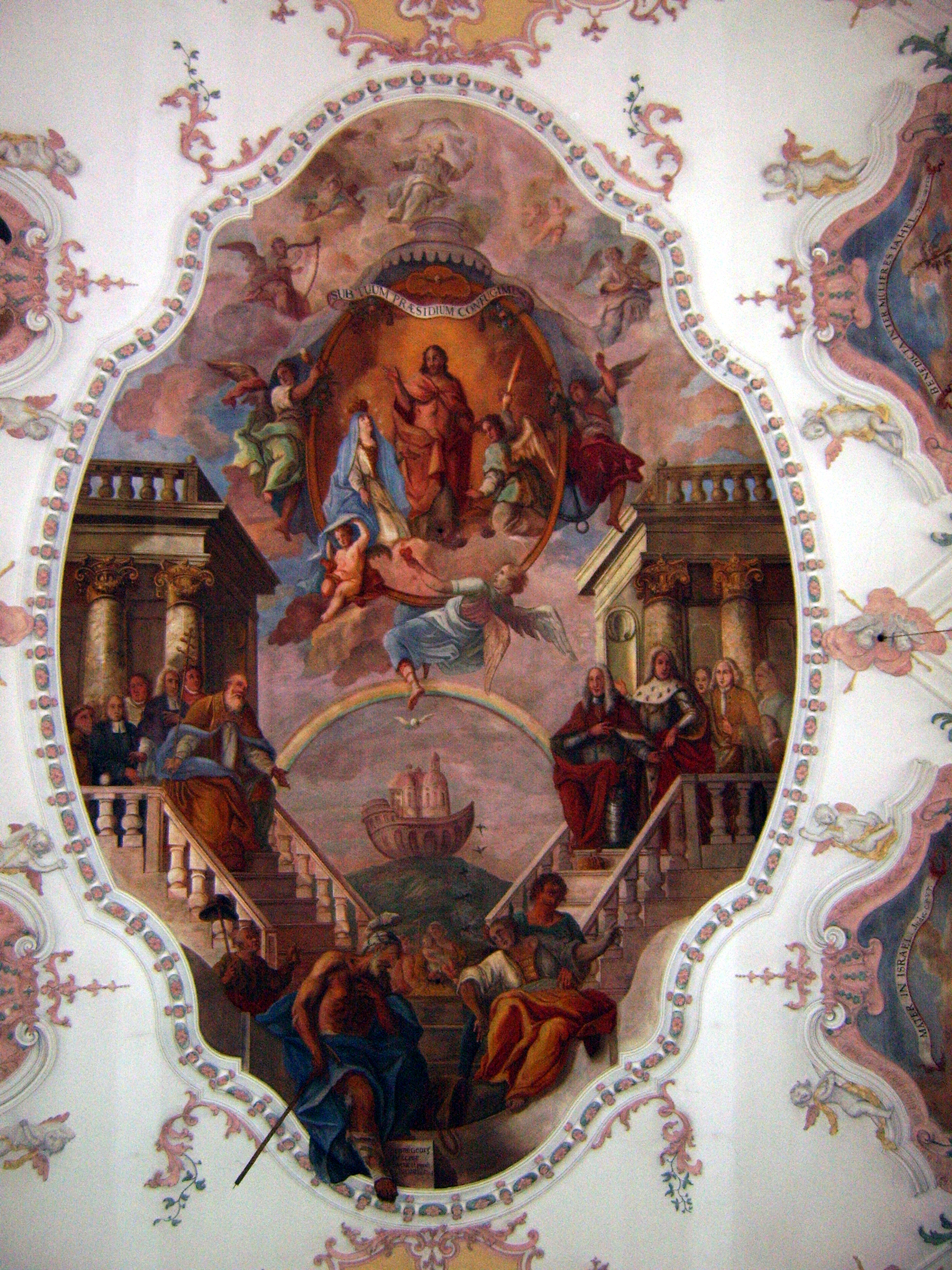
Ceiling of the Church of Our Lady of Help

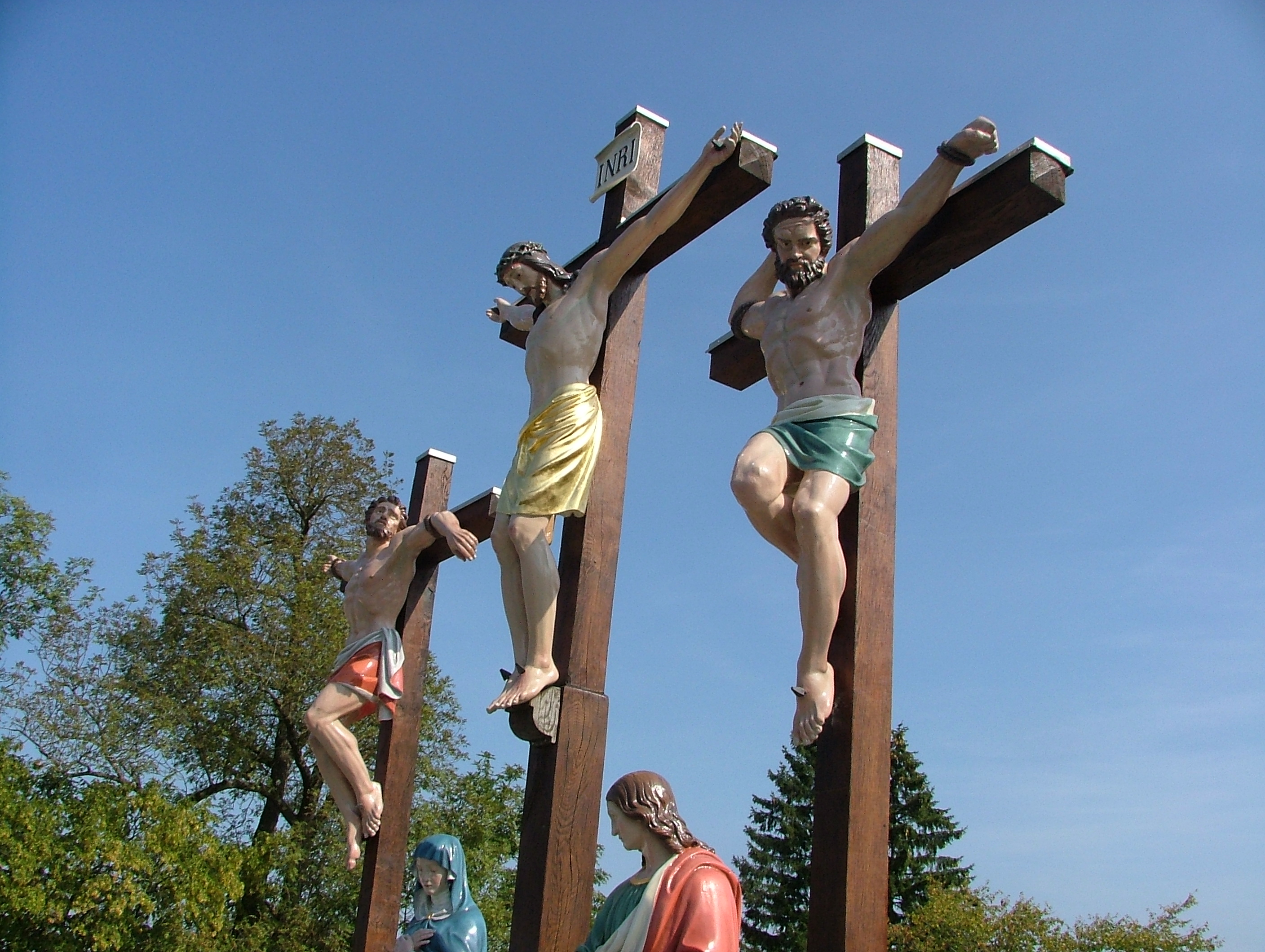
Kalvarienberg Klosterlechfeld

== Transport ==
The municipality has a railway station, Klosterlechfeld, on the Bobingen–Landsberg am Lech line.
