= Hansjörg Durz =

German politician

Hansjörg Durz MdB
- Durz in 2018

Member of the Bundestag; for Augsburg-Land
- Incumbent
- Assumed office 22 October 2013
- Preceded by: Eduard Oswald

Personal details
- Born: 29 July 1971 (age 55) Augsburg, West Germany
- Party: Christian Social Union
- Children: 2
- Education: University of Augsburg
- Website: http://www.hansjoerg-durz.de/

Hansjörg Durz is a German politician (CSU). He has been a Member of the German Bundestag since 2013. Before that he served as mayor in the bavarian city of Neusäß.

== Early life and education ==
Hansjörg Durz was born in Augsburg and raised in Neusäß-Täfertingen. In 1991, he obtained the Abitur at Rhabanus-Maurus-Gymnasium St. Ottilien. After that he completed a vocational training as a bank clerk, before he studied business administration at Augsburg University. He founded an e-commerce business in 1999 and worked as managing director until he became mayor of Neusäß.

== Political career ==
Durz joined the CSU in 1992. In 1996 he became a member of the city council of Neusäß and was elected deputy mayor of the city six years later. In 2008 he became mayor of Neusäß.

Since 2002, Durz has been a member of the country council Augsburg.

In 2013, Durz was elected to the German Bundestag as direct candidate of the constituency Augsburg-Land. He repeated this in the elections of 2017 and 2021.

In the 19th legislative session Durz served as deputy chairman to the committee on digital affairs and was a member of the committee on economic affairs. He was the spokesperson on digital affairs of the CSU in the Bundestag.

Durz was a member of the "Committee Competition Law 4.0" of the Federal Ministry on Economic Affairs, which made proposals for the adjustment of the European competition law to digital markets in 2019. Later, he took on responsibility for the tenth amendment of the Act against Restraints of Competition (GWB), which was one of the initiatives to adopt the Digital Markets Act at EU level.

As one of the first politicians, Durz called for the implementation of legal research clauses in the Netzwerkdurchsetzungsgesetz, a predecessor of the Digital Services Act. With it researchers can get access to data held by big social media companies to understand the modi operandi and the impact of social media in the public sphere.

In the 20th legislative session, Durz has been a member of the committee on digital affairs and economic affairs. He holds the position as chairman of the CDU/CSU faction in the committee of economic affairs.

Furthermore, Durz holds the position as Deputy regional group chairman of the CSU in the German Bundestag.
