= Anton Fischer (composer) =

Composer (1778–1808)

Anton Fischer (January 1778 – December 1, 1808) was a German composer and tenor. He is primarily remembered as an opera composer in the singspiel genre who was active in Vienna in the first decade of the 19th century.

== Biography ==
Anton Fischer was baptized in Ried, Swabia, Bavaria on January 13, 1778. He initially studied music with his brother, the composer Matthäus Fischer. In the late 1790s he sang in the chorus of the Theater in der Josefstadt in Vienna. He left there to join Emanuel Schikaneder's Freihaus-Theater auf der Wieden in 1800 where he sang as a tenor in comprimario roles in operas. He also worked as a composer of singspiels (a type of opera) at this theater; beginning with Lunara, Königin des Palmenhains which premiered on 20 September 1800. In 1806 he was appointed assistant chorus master under Ignaz von Seyfried when Schikaneder's company moved to the Theater an der Wien. He died young and unexpectedly two years later on December 1, 1808 in Vienna.

During his lifetime Fischer composed eleven singspiels, two masses, two cantatas, several songs and arias, marches, and works for piano. His most successful singspiel was Das Hausgesinde (1808) which was given 115 times in the Theater an der Wien. His other operas, mainly staged by Schikaneder's company in Vienna, included Die Entlarvten (1803), Die Scheidewand (1804), Die Verwandlungen (1805), Swetards Zaubertal (1805), Die Festung an der Elbe (1806), Das Singspiel auf dem Dache (1807), Die Ruinen von Portici (1807, Stuttgart), Das Milchmädchen von Bercy (1808), and Theseus und Ariadne (premiered posthumously in 1809).
