= Rehling =

- Municipality
- Coat of arms

- Location of Rehling within Aichach-Friedberg district
- Interactive map of Rehling
- Location within Germany Location within Bavaria
- Coordinates: 48°29′N 10°56′E
- Country: Germany
- State: Bavaria
- Admin. region: Schwaben
- District: Aichach-Friedberg

Government
  - Mayor (2020–26): Christoph Aidelsburger

Area
  - Total: 26.26 km^{2} (10.14 sq mi)
- Elevation: 485 m (1,591 ft)

Population (2025-12-31)
  - Total: 2,710
  - Density: 103/km^{2} (267/sq mi)
- Time zone: UTC+01:00 (CET)
  - Summer (DST): UTC+02:00 (CEST)
- Postal codes: 86508
- Dialling codes: 08237
- Vehicle registration: AIC, FDB
- Website: www.gemeinde-rehling.de

Rehling is a municipality in the district of Aichach-Friedberg in Bavaria in Germany.
