= Rainer Kraft (politician) =

German politician

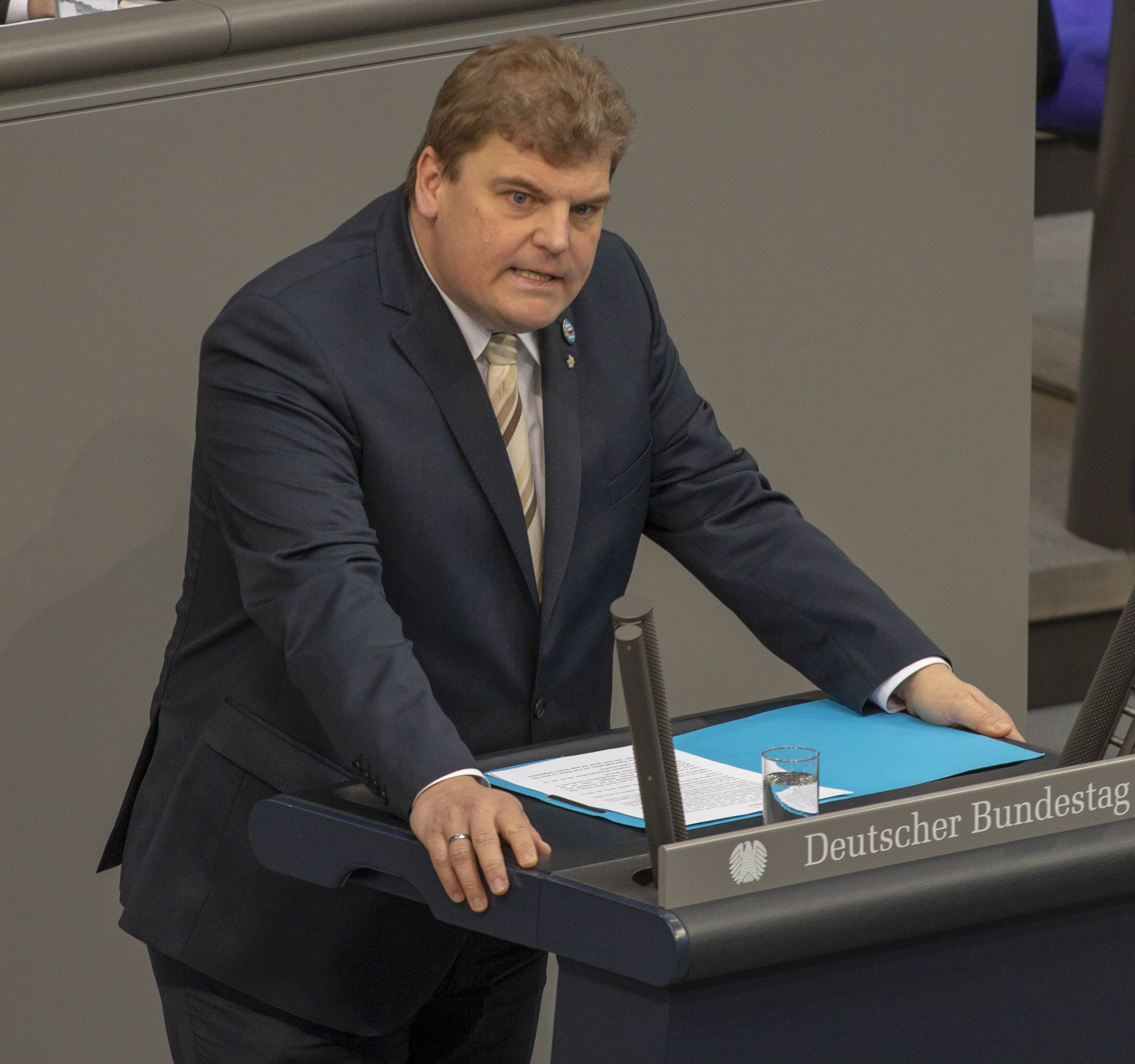

Member of the Bundestag
- Incumbent
- Assumed office 24 October 2017

Personal details
- Born: 8 January 1974 (age 52) Gräfelfing
- Party: Alternative for Germany

Rainer Kraft (born 8 January 1974 in Gräfelfing) is a German politician for the Alternative for Germany (AfD) and since 2017 member of the Bundestag.

== Life and politics ==
Kraft was born 1974 in the West German town of Gräfelfing and studied chemistry and reached his PhD in 2002. Kraft entered the newly founded populist AfD in 2013 and became after the 2017 German federal election a member of the Bundestag. Kraft is considered to be part of the far-right factional cluster Der Flügel (the wing).

Kraft denies the scientific consensus on climate change.
