= Hollenbach =

- Municipality
- Coat of arms

- Location of Hollenbach within Aichach-Friedberg district
- Interactive map of Hollenbach
- Location within Germany Location within Bavaria
- Coordinates: 48°29′N 11°4′E
- Country: Germany
- State: Bavaria
- Admin. region: Schwaben
- District: Aichach-Friedberg

Government
  - Mayor (2020–26): Xaver Ziegler

Area
  - Total: 26.12 km^{2} (10.08 sq mi)
- Elevation: 456 m (1,496 ft)

Population (2025-12-31)
  - Total: 2,530
  - Density: 96.9/km^{2} (251/sq mi)
- Time zone: UTC+01:00 (CET)
  - Summer (DST): UTC+02:00 (CEST)
- Postal codes: 86568
- Dialling codes: 08257
- Vehicle registration: AIC
- Website: www.gemeinde-hollenbach.de

Hollenbach is a municipality in the district of Aichach-Friedberg in Bavaria in Germany. It has about 2400 inhabitants.

== Partner cities ==
Hollenbach has a partnership with the commune of Contest, Mayenne, France, since 1991.
