= Merching =

- Municipality
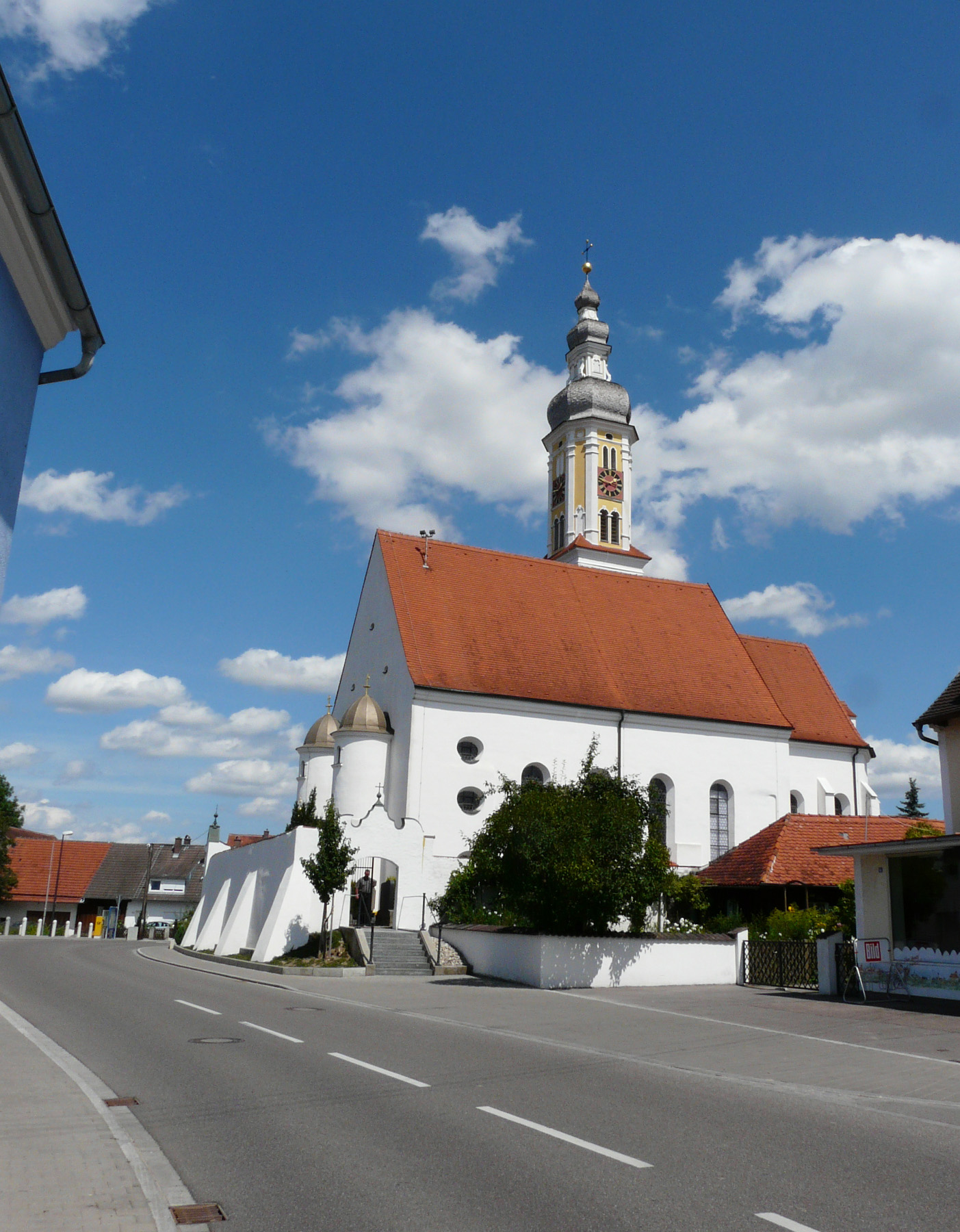
- Saint Martin Church

- Coat of arms

- Location of Merching within Aichach-Friedberg district
- Interactive map of Merching
- Location within Germany Location within Bavaria
- Coordinates: 48°15′N 10°59′E
- Country: Germany
- State: Bavaria
- Admin. region: Schwaben
- District: Aichach-Friedberg

Government
  - Mayor (2020–26): Helmut Luichtl (CSU)

Area
  - Total: 24.83 km^{2} (9.59 sq mi)
- Elevation: 529 m (1,736 ft)

Population (2025-12-31)
  - Total: 3,203
  - Density: 129.0/km^{2} (334.1/sq mi)
- Time zone: UTC+01:00 (CET)
  - Summer (DST): UTC+02:00 (CEST)
- Postal codes: 86504
- Dialling codes: 08233
- Vehicle registration: AIC
- Website: www.merching.de

Merching is a municipality in the district of Aichach-Friedberg in Bavaria in Germany.

The coat of arms of Merching contains references to the two most important landowners in the Middle Ages. The top half is taken from the Counts of Andechs coat of arms. The bottom half comes from the Abbey of Saints Ulrich and Afra.

== History ==
There have been mentions of Merching Castle since 1078, but no archeological evidence has been found of it.
