= Landsberg am Lech–Schongau railway =

Railway line in Germany

Landsberg (Lech)–Schongau
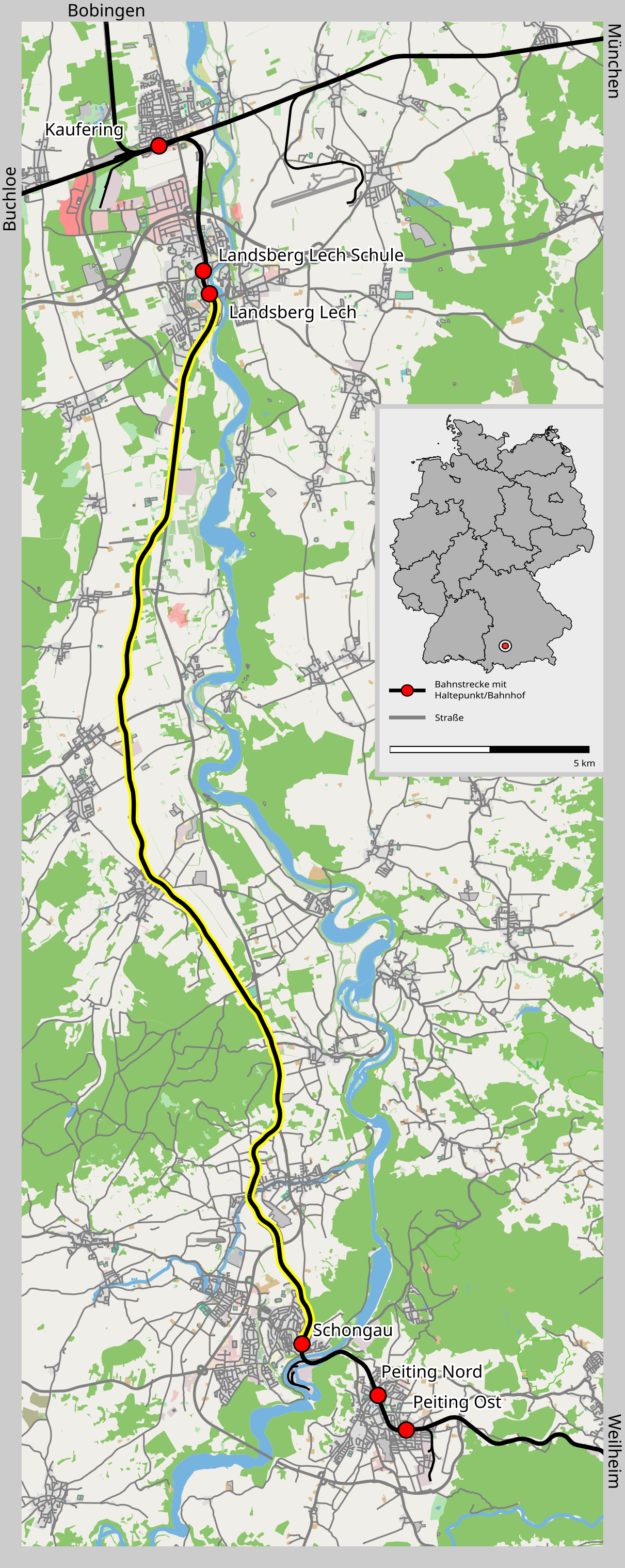

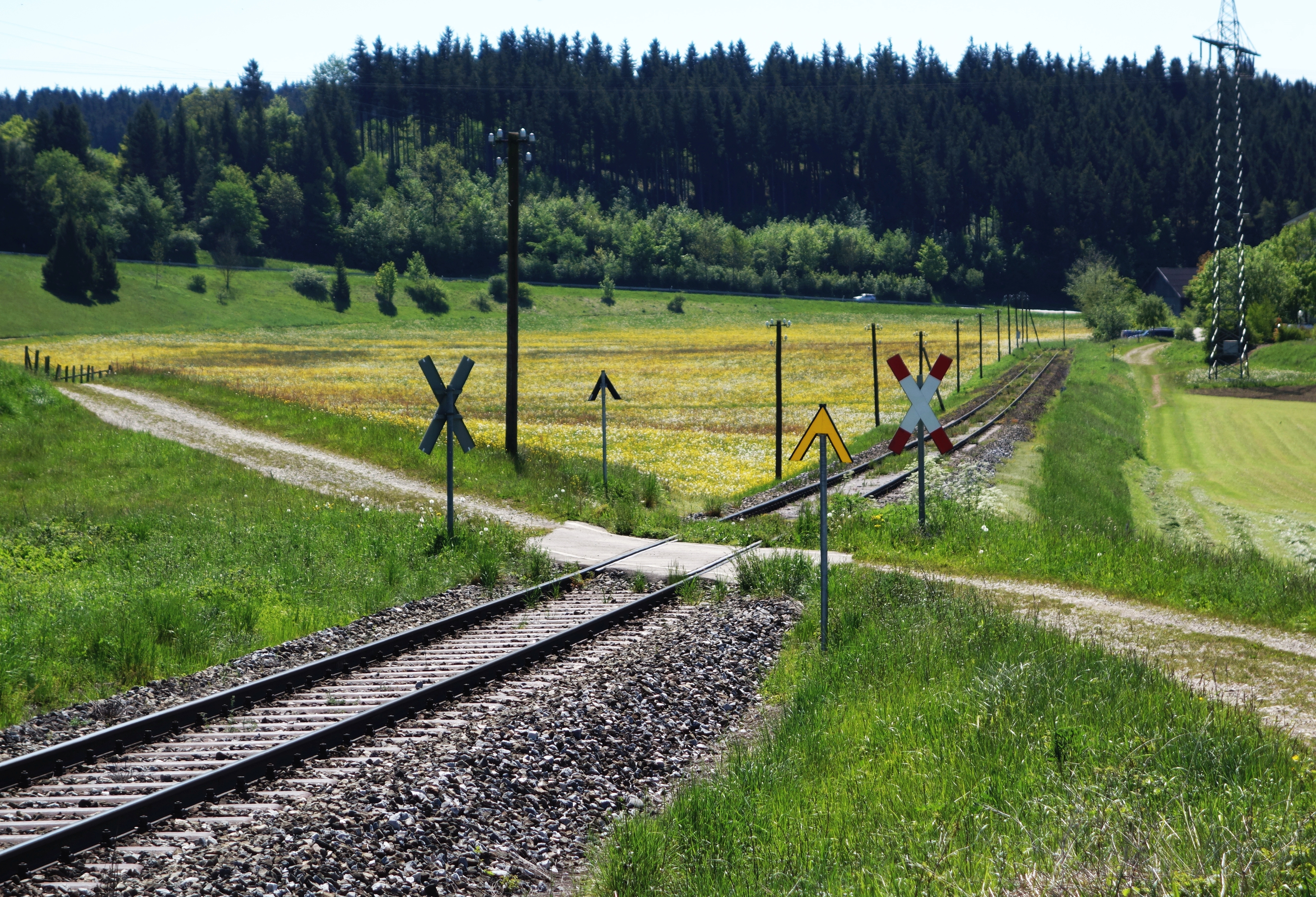
- Landsberg–Schongau railway crosses Feldweg north of Krankenhaus Shongau

Overview
- Line number: 5365

Technical
- Line length: 28.7 km (17.8 mi)
- Number of tracks: 1
- Electrification: non-electrified

The Landsberg am Lech–Schongau railway is a railway line from Landsberg am Lech to Schongau via Fuchstal, Denklingen and Hohenfurch. The line is also called the Fuchstalbahn (English: Fox Valley Railway).

== History ==
=== Freight use ===
The Buchloe–Kaufering–Landsberg am Lech line was opened on 1 November 1872. The Buchloe–Kaufering section has been extended to the Buchloe–Lindau railway. The remaining 4.83 kilometres (3.00 mi) section runs from Kaufering to Landsberg am Lech. The Landsberg–Schongau railway goes 28.70 kilometres (17.83 mi) further to Schongau and was opened for operations on 16 November 1886.

From 1907 to 1929 there was a railway station connecting to the Kinsau cog railway that connected as a work train the Landsberg am Lech pulp factory with the Landsberg–Schongau railway.

Freight services have been provided by the Augsburg Localbahn since 1998.

=== Passenger use ===
Until 1984 regular passenger services were offered on this line.

The track owner DB Netz redeveloped the majority of the track in 2010–2013. During this renovation, in October 2013, the existing remains of the platform of the Hohenfurch station were removed.

== Reactivation for passenger use ==
Citing the ever-increasing volume of traffic on the parallel B17 and the positive migration balance in the regions around Munich, the Initiative Fuchstalbahn e.V. called for the resumption of passenger traffic and organized occasional extra tours in cooperation with railway companies, both with historic steam locomotives as well as with modern railcars (e.g. during the summer holiday weekends in 2009 with a railcar from the Bayerische Regiobahn, in July 2015, with a historic railcar of VT 98.8 Series).

The county of Landsberg am Lech supported these requests. Concerns were voiced out in the municipality of Landsberg am Lech, because of the expectation of frequently closed railroad crossings on main roads in urban areas.

As early as 2002 a report positively evaluated the reactivation of passenger traffic. The Bavarian state government, however, rejected a reactivation because at the time expected costs for infrastructure reestablishment were estimated to be around 10-13 million euro.

In mid-2013, the infrastructure costs were estimated to be about EUR 20 million. A significant part of this sum would have to be paid for by the municipalities. The commissioning of an updated report was discussed, which was to be funded equally by the district Landsberg and from Weilheim-Schongau in 2014. As of December 2013, however, it was not commissioned.

In February 2014, the Bavarian Transport Minister Joachim Herrmann refused the collaboration of the Bavarian Railway Company on such reports.

=== Possible stop Schongau-Nord ===
There are considerations to let the trains running on the Pfaffenwinkelbahn from Weilheim to Schongau continue on the route of the Fuchstalbahn to the north to a new stopping point Schongau-Nord located at the Schongau hospital. The cost of this is estimated at 20 million euros, 18 million of which would be spent on the new Schongau signal box that would then be required. In addition, the construction of a turning facility and special construction measures would be necessary because of the location on a slope. The construction of the stop could require a rededication of the Schongau-Schongau-Nord line section to the Weilheim-Schongau line at the expense of the Fuchstalbahn, so that it would not be possible to speak of a partial reactivation of passenger traffic on the latter line, which would be politically problematic.
