= Ried, Bavaria =

Ried
- Municipality
- Coat of arms

- Location of Ried within Aichach-Friedberg district
- Interactive map of Ried
- Location within Germany Location within Bavaria
- Coordinates: 48°18′N 11°3′E
- Country: Germany
- State: Bavaria
- Admin. region: Schwaben
- District: Aichach-Friedberg

Government
  - Mayor (2020–26): Erwin Gerstlacher (CSU)

Area
  - Total: 29.21 km^{2} (11.28 sq mi)
- Elevation: 526 m (1,726 ft)

Population (2025-12-31)
  - Total: 3,289
  - Density: 112.6/km^{2} (291.6/sq mi)
- Time zone: UTC+01:00 (CET)
  - Summer (DST): UTC+02:00 (CEST)
- Postal codes: 86510
- Dialling codes: 08233, 08202. 08208
- Vehicle registration: AIC

Ried is a municipality in the district of Aichach-Friedberg in Bavaria in Germany.

== Notable people ==
- Anton Fischer (1778–1808), German composer and tenor; born in Ried
