= Landsberg (Lech) station =

Railway station in Bavaria

Landsberg (Lech)
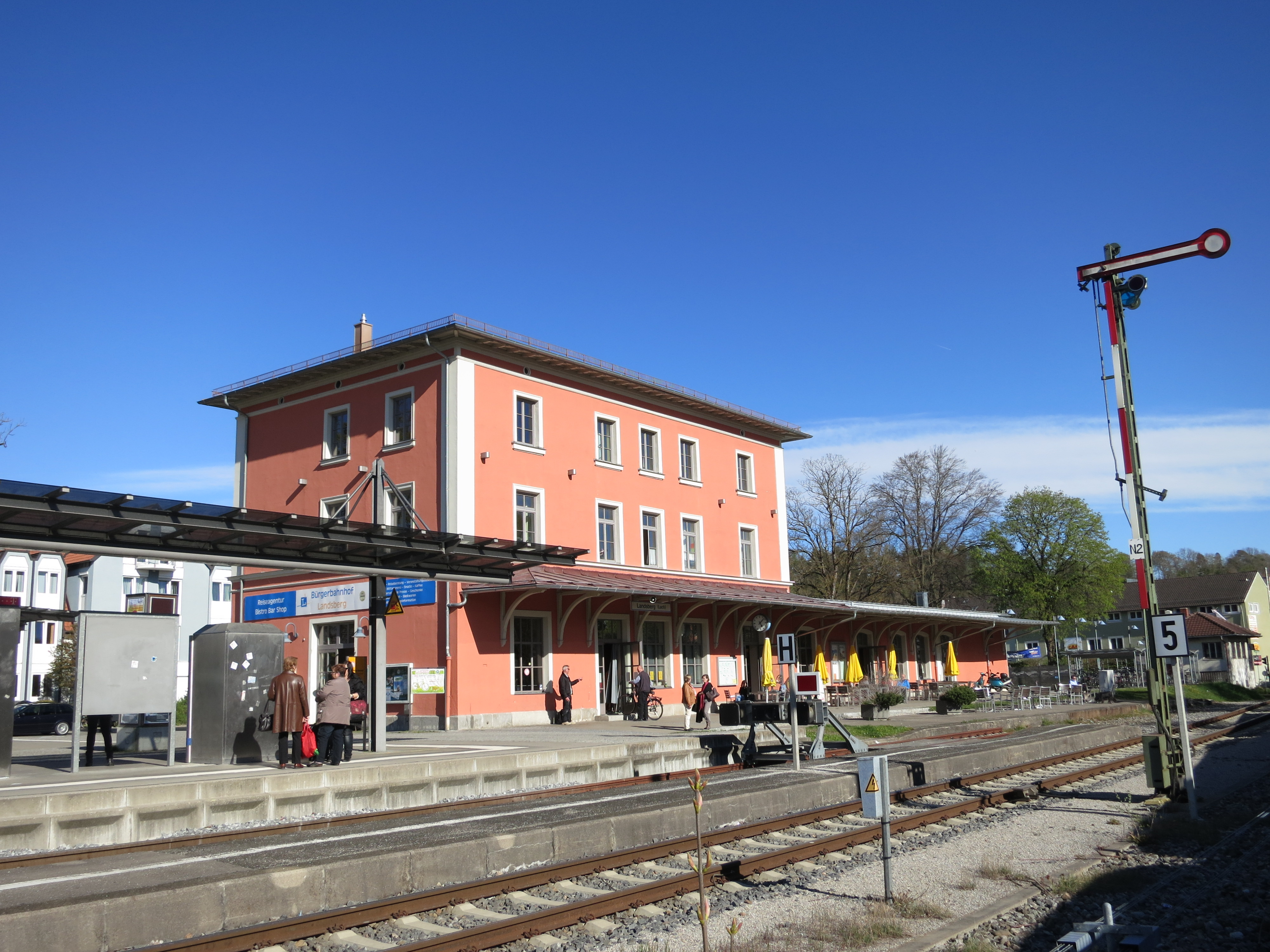
- The station in 2014

General information
- Location: Landsberg am Lech, Bavaria; Germany
- Coordinates: 48°02′50″N 10°52′18″E
- Owner: DB Netz
- Operator: DB Station&Service
- Lines: Bobingen–Landsberg am Lech line (KBS 986); Landsberg am Lech–Schongau line
- Distance: 4.8 km (3.0 mi) from Kaufering
- Platforms: 1 side platform
- Tracks: 1
- Train operators: Bayerische Regiobahn
- Connections: Landsberger Verkehrsgemeinschaft buses

Other information
- Station code: 3509
- DS100 code: MLL
- IBNR: 8002189
- Category: 6

Services
Preceding station		Following station
Landsberg (Lech) Schule towards Augsburg Hbf	RB 69	Terminus
Location

Landsberg (Lech) station (German: Bahnhof Landsberg (Lech)) is a railway station in the municipality of Landsberg am Lech, in Bavaria, Germany. It is located at the junction of the Bobingen–Landsberg am Lech and Landsberg am Lech–Schongau lines of Deutsche Bahn.

== Services ==
As of the December 2021 timetable change, the following services stop at Landsberg (Lech):

- RB: half-hourly service to Kaufering; some trains continue from Kaufering to Augsburg.
