= Kaufering station =

Railway station in Bavaria, Germany

Kaufering
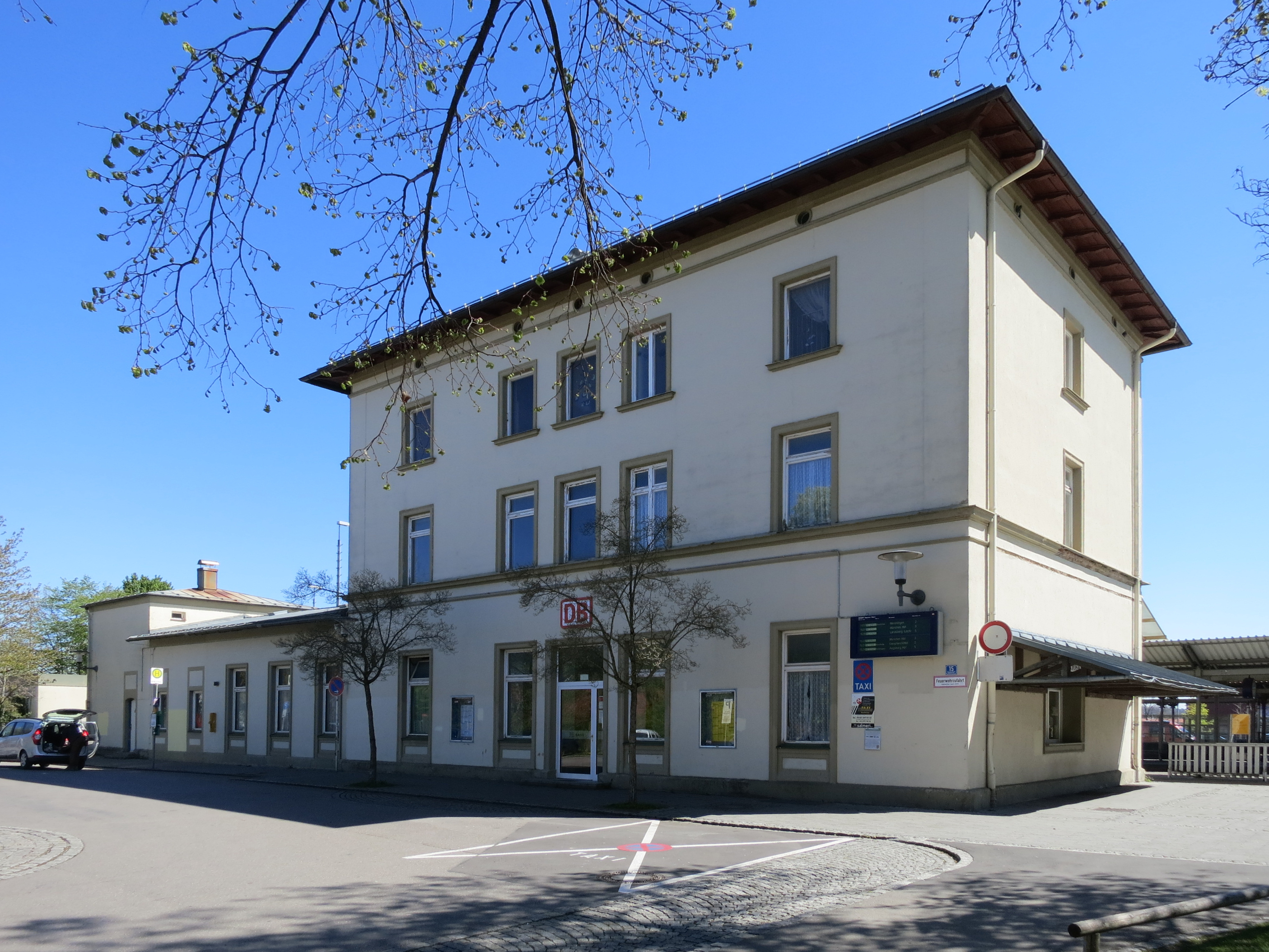

General information
- Location: Kaufering, Bavaria; Germany
- Coordinates: 48°04′51″N 10°51′17″E
- Owner: Deutsche Bahn
- Operator: DB Netz; DB Station&Service
- Lines: Munich–Buchloe railway (KBS 970); Bobingen–Landsberg am Lech (KBS 986)
- Platforms: 5
- Connections: 13 30 31 40 70 92 301

Other information
- Station code: 3142
- DS100 code: MKFG
- IBNR: 8000195
- Category: 4

History
- Opened: 1 November 1872

Passengers
- 7,000

Services
Preceding station	DB Regio Bayern	Following station
Buchloe towards Lindau-Insel	RE 70	Geltendorf towards München Hbf
Buchloe towards Oberstdorf	RE 76	Geltendorf towards München Hbf
Buchloe Terminus	RB 74	Geltendorf towards München Hbf
Preceding station		Following station
Buchloe towards Memmingen	RE 72	Geltendorf towards München Hbf
Buchloe towards Lindau-Reutin	RE 96 Limited service	Geltendorf towards München Hbf
Preceding station		Following station
Buchloe towards Füssen	RB 68	Geltendorf towards München Hbf
Klosterlechfeld towards Augsburg Hbf	RB 69	Landsberg (Lech) Schule towards Landsberg (Lech)
Location
- Location within Bavaria Location within Germany Location within Europe

Kaufering station is the station of the market town of Kaufering in the Upper Bavarian district of Landsberg am Lech. The station has five platform tracks and is classified by Deutsche Bahn as a category 4 station. It is used daily by about 140 trains operated by DB Regio and Regentalbahn and is an interchange station between the Munich–Buchloe railway and the Bobingen–Landsberg am Lech railway (Lechfeld Railway).

== Location ==
Kaufering station is located south of Kaufering. The station area is bounded to the north by Bahnhofstrasse and to the south by Viktor-Frankl-Straße. The station building is located north of the tracks and has the address of Bahnhofstrasse 15.

== History ==
Kaufering station was opened on 1 November 1872 with the completion of the Buchloe–Kaufering–Landsberg railway. The line from Munich to Buchloe was opened on 1 May 1873. The Lechfeld Railway via Bobingen to Augsburg was opened on 15 May 1877. Kaufering was now a railway junction. On 5 April 1893, signalling at the station was centralised, which meant that the levers for setting the switches and signals were brought together on a single a lever frame. A command signal box was installed in the station building; this was operated by the dispatcher and two other signalmen. The station was rebuilt in 1906 as part of the duplication of the Munich–Buchloe line and it received a pedestrian subway and platform canopies; a warming-up shed for locomotives and a waterworks were built. In World War II, the volume of traffic increased at the station because there was a munitions factory in the vicinity of the station. An air-raid shelter was built in 1944. The transport of all munitions and the concentration camp prisoners, who were forced to build the shelter, passed through Kaufering station. As a result, the station's network of tracks developed during the war and Kaufering now had 15 tracks. On 27 June 1979, the mechanical interlocking was replaced by a push button interlocking. The old waterworks was demolished in 1981. The extension of the platform tunnels to the south to the new park-and-ride facility was completed in 1997.

=== Station building ===
The station building was built in 1872 as a three-story building of unrendered brick. The doors and windows were arranged symmetrically. The building was plastered and painted white after the First World War. Between 1990 and 1991 the building was renovated. There is a ticket office in the entrance building still.

== Infrastructure ==
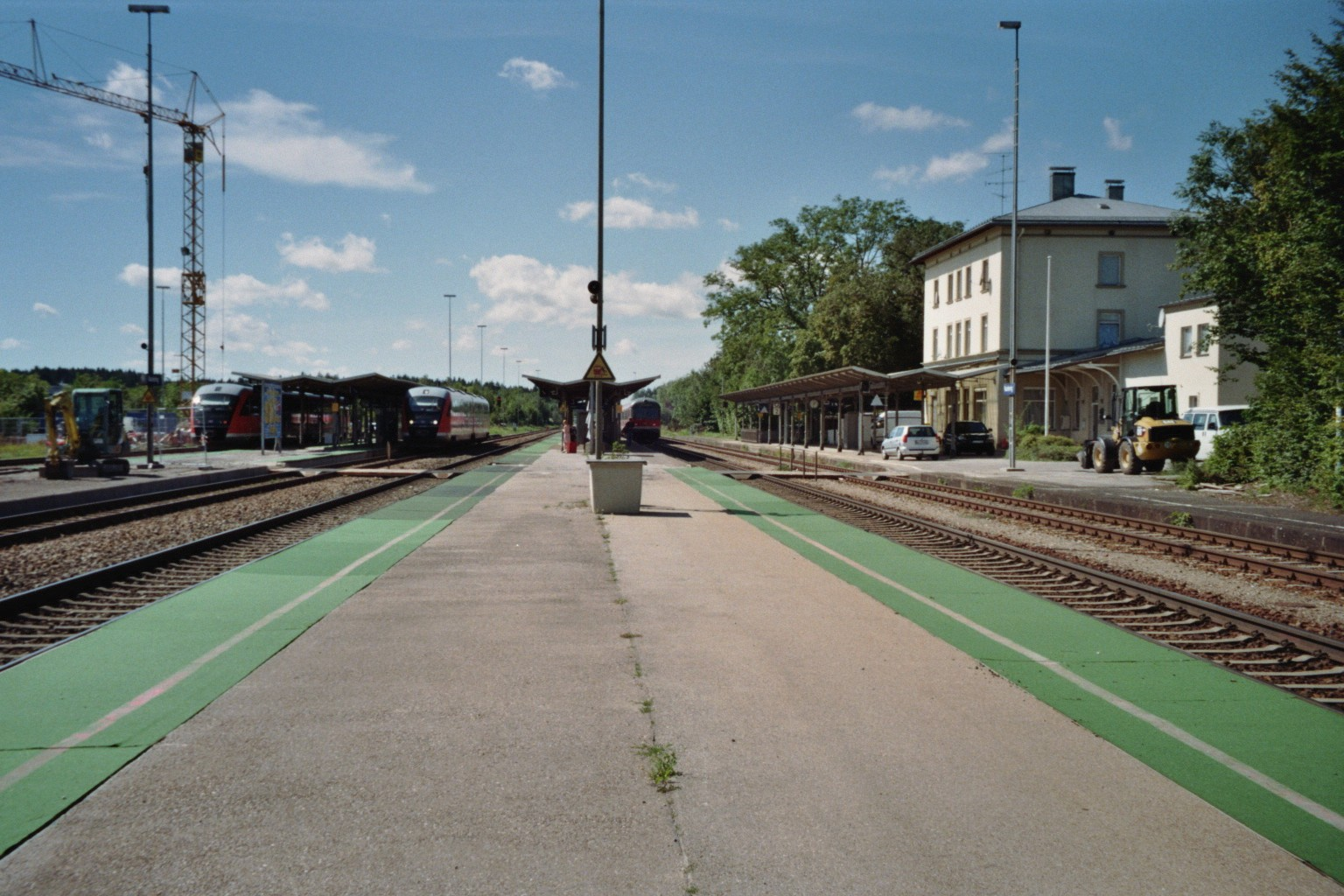
Station platforms

Kaufering station has five platform tracks on three platforms, including the platform next to the station building, platform 1. The platforms are covered and have digital destination displays. All platforms are connected to platform 1 by a pedestrian tunnel. The station is not accessible by the disabled. There is a park-and-ride lot at the station.

=== Platforms ===
Platforms are used as follows:

- Platform 1 is no longer used in scheduled operations
- Platform 2 is served by regional trains towards Buchloe
- Platform 3 is served by regional trains towards Munich
- Platform 4 is served by regional trains towards Augsburg
- Platform 5 is served by regional trains towards Landsberg

=== Platform data ===
Platform lengths and heights are as follows:

- Platform 1: length 211 m, height 22 cm
- Platform 2: length 255 m, height 22 cm
- Platform 3: length 255 m, height 22 cm
- Platform 4: length 176 m, height 22 cm
- Platform 5: length 124 m, height 22 cm

== Operations ==
The station is operated with trains meeting at the station at regular intervals: every half hour there are connections towards Buchloe, Munich and Landsberg and every hour there are connections toward Augsburg as well.

Kaufering station has been served since 9 December 2007 by alex (until 2010: Arriva Länderbahn-Express) services operated by Regentalbahn between Munich and Lindau and Oberstdorf. This gives Kaufering a fast connection to Munich and the Allgäu. In addition, Regional-Express services run on the Munich–Memmingen, Munich–Fussen and Munich–Kempten routes every two hours.

In addition, Kaufering station is served every hour by Regionalbahn services towards Augsburg and Landsberg am Lech. Additional shuttle trains run to Landsberg to provide a 30-minute interval service.

The Regional-Express and alex services together produce a service every half hour between Munich and Buchloe.

Line/ train type	Route	Frequency
RE 70/RE 76	Munich – Geltendorf – Kaufering – Buchloe – Kaufbeuren – Kempten (Allgäu) – Immenstadt – Oberstdorf / – Hergatz – Lindau	Some trains
RE 72	Munich – Geltendorf – Kaufering – Buchloe – Türkheim (Bay) – Memmingen	Every 2 hours
RB 74	Munich – Geltendorf – Kaufering – Buchloe – Kaufbeuren – Biessenhofen – Kempten (Allgäu)	Every 2 hours
RB 68	Munich – Geltendorf – Kaufering – Buchloe – Kaufbeuren – Biessenhofen – Füssen	Every 2 hours
RB 69	Kneipp-Lechfeld-Bahn: Landsberg (Lech) – Kaufering (– Augsburg)	Every 30 minutes

Four pairs of EuroCity trains on line 88 (Munich–Zurich) run through Kaufering without stopping.

== Future ==
It is planned to upgrade the Munich–Buchloe-Memmingen-Lindau line and to electrify the Geltendorf-Buchloe-Memmingen-Lindau section. This work was formerly expected to last from 2014 to 2016 and be commissioned in 2017, but this work is likely to be delayed due to a recently identified cost increase. There are also plans to upgrade the station to make it accessible for the disabled.
