= Bobingen–Landsberg am Lech railway =

Railway line in Bavaria, Germany

Lechfeld Railway
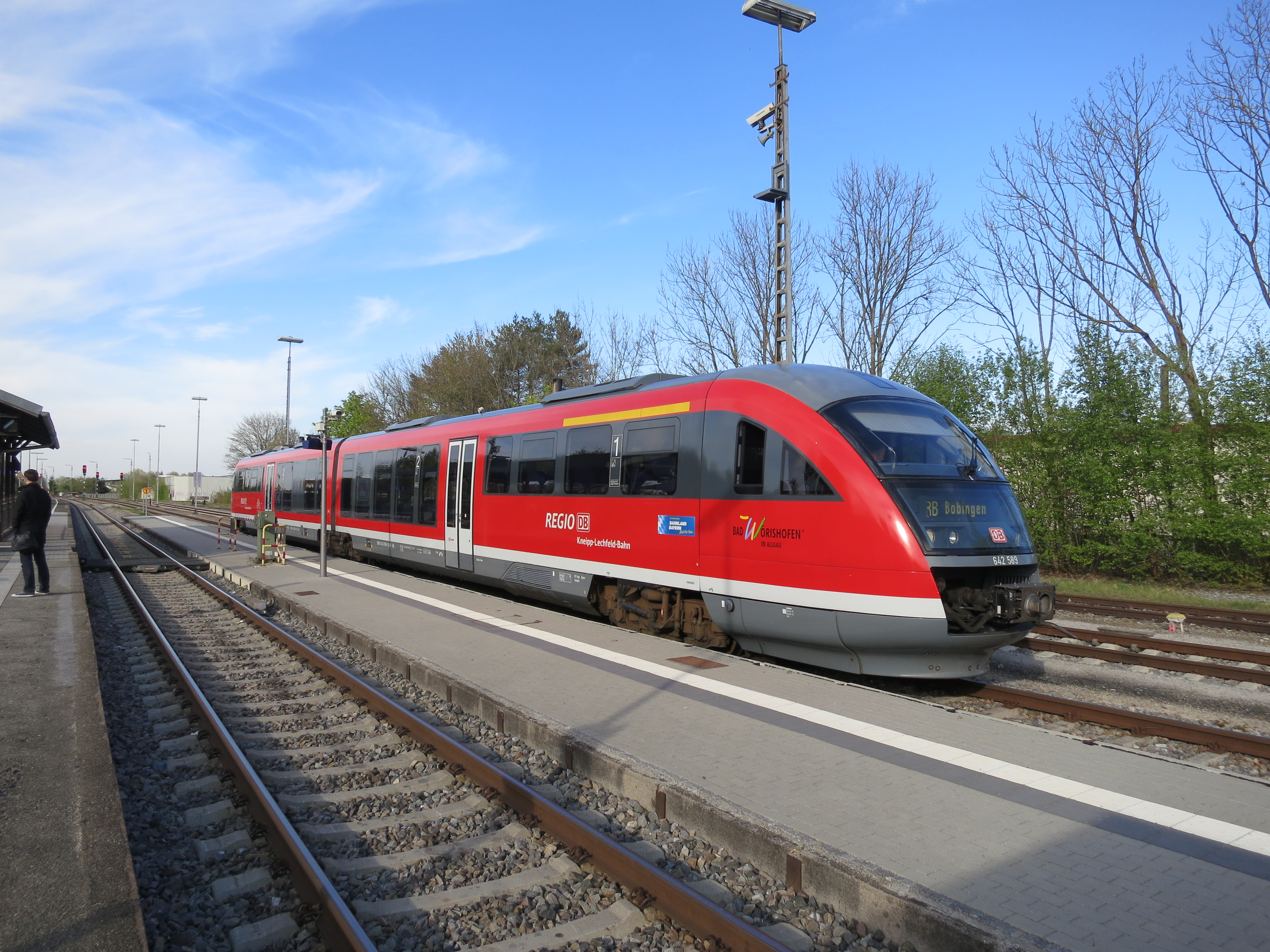
- A DB Regio train at Bobingen station in 2014

Overview
- Owner: DB Netz
- Line number: 410
- Locale: Bavaria, Germany

Service
- Route number: 986
- Operator(s): DB Regio

Technical
- Line length: 27.4 km (17.0 mi)
- Number of tracks: 1
- Track gauge: 1,435 mm (4 ft 8 1/2 in) standard gauge
- Electrification: non-electrified
Route map
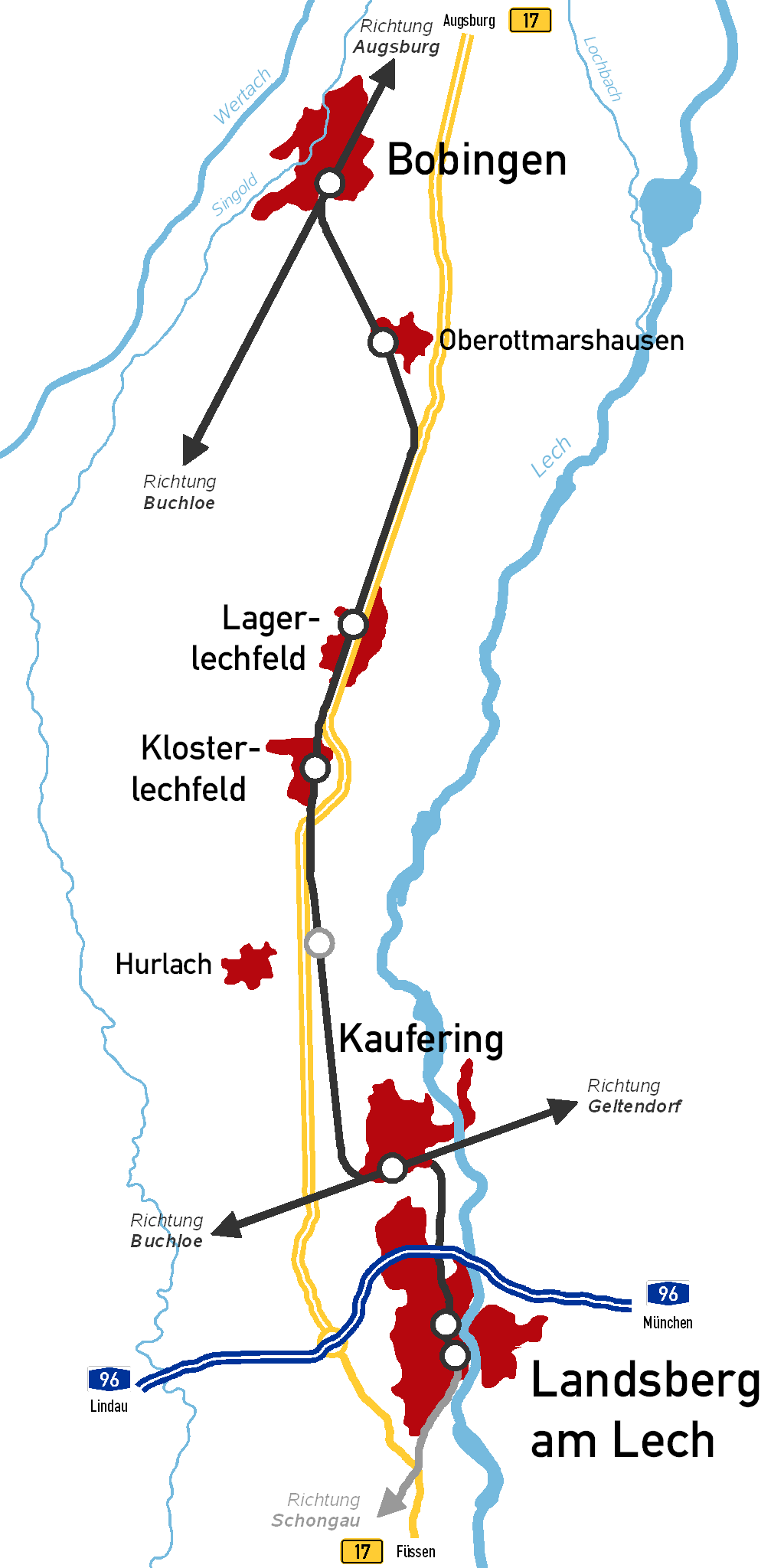
- Source: German railway atlas

The Bobingen–Landsberg am Lech railway (also called Lechfeld railway or Lechtal railway) is a branch line in Swabia and Upper Bavaria.

The existing Bobingen-Kaufering railway since 1877 is a 22.6 km long single-track link between the Augsburg-Buchloe and Munich-Buchloe lines. From the perspective of railway operations, part of the Lechfeld railway was opened (Kaufering-Landsberg am Lech branch) five years before the main part was finished.

== History ==
=== Pre-WWII ===
On 1 September 1847, the 60.19 km long connection from Augsburg Central Station via Bobingen and Buchloe to Kaufbeuren was opened up as a result of the Bavarian Act of 25 August 1843. In Bobingen a branch was opened on 15 May 1877, which is a 22.6 km long Lechfeld track to Kaufering.

A 4.83 km extension was opened on 1 November 1872 to Landsberg am Lech. The Fox Valley Railway leads from there for 28.71 km to Schongau and has traveled for the first time on 16 November 1886. The Landsberg station is the interface between the Lechfeld railway and the Landsberg am Lech–Schongau railway (or Fuchstalbahn: Fox Valley Railway) between Landsberg am Lech and Schongau.

In addition to the civilian use, Lechfeld railway was also used in military. So a 7.4 km long parallel track between Klosterlechfeld and the military training area was relocated. In this way, equipment and soldiers could be implemented quickly. In addition, there was a siding for ammunition depot.

=== Post-WWII ===
The scale of the 19th century infrastructure along the railway was dismantled after World War II. The military railway was closed in 1957. The freight was set similar to many other secondary lines in the 1990s and terminated appropriate systems (freight tracks and goods warehouses). The route is only used by the Augsburg Localbahn as connection towards Schongau.

The railcar service were not abandoned despite prolonged discussions. After integration in the Allgäu-Swabia clock face service the frequency of trains was increased and then new railcars were put into service. In 2002, Lechfeld railway celebrated its 125th anniversary.

On 21 October 2012, the Graben (Lechfeld)-Gewerbepark station opened between Oberottmarshausen and Lagerlechfeld. It improved connections to an industrial park, which had opened in recent years.
