= List of islands in Lake Constance =

Lake Constance, in Europe, has about a dozen islands, including some former islands that are now attached to the mainland.

	Island	Area (m^{2})	Population	Municipality	Country	Coordinates
1	Galgeninsel	peninsula since 19th century	-	Lindau (Reutin district)	Germany	47°33′00″N 09°42′14″E
2	Hoy	53	-	Lindau (Reutin district)	Germany	47°32′57.35″N 09°41′48″E
3	Lindau	680,000	3,000	Lindau (Island district)	Germany	47°32′47″N 09°41′00″E
4	Wasserburg	peninsula since 1720	27	Wasserburg (Island district)	Germany	47°34′02″N 09°37′46″E
5	Mainau	447,584	185	Konstanz (Litzelstetten district)	Germany	47°42′18″N 09°11′46″E
6	Dominicans Island	18,318	21	Konstanz (Altstadt district)	Germany	47°39′51″N 09°10′42″E
7	Mittlerer Langbohl	31,254	-	Konstanz (Industriegebiet district)	Germany	47°40′18″N 09°07′32″E
8	Triboldingerbohl	135,570	-	Konstanz (Industriegebiet district)	Germany	47°40′20″N 09°07′22″E
9	Reichenau	4,300,000	3,200	Reichenau (Niederzell|Mittelzell|Oberzell)	Germany	47°41′40″N 09°03′48″E
10	Liebesinsel	300	-	Radolfzell (Mettnau district)	Germany	47°43′18″N 09°00′19″E
11	Werd	15,854	9	Eschenz (Untereschenz district)	Switzerland	47°39′19″N 08°52′00″E
12	Mittleres Werdli	4,000	-	Stein am Rhein	Switzerland	47°39′24″N 08°51′57″E
13	Unteres Werdli	6,000	-	Stein am Rhein	Switzerland	47°39′25″N 08°51′50″E
	Lake Constance Islands	5,637,079	6,400	6 municipalities		
