= Vogelinsel (Lake Constance) =

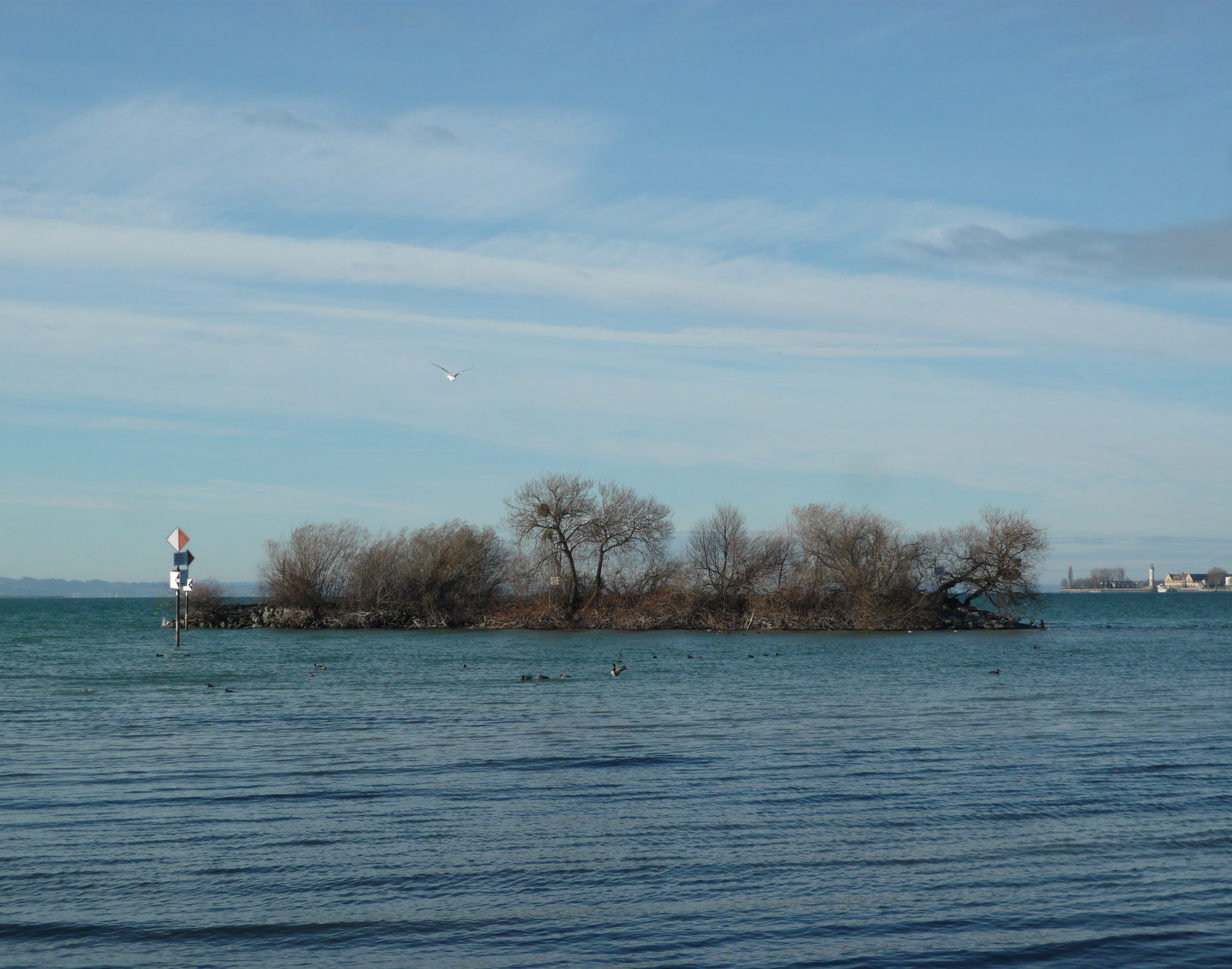
- The Vogelinsel

Geography
- Adjacent to: Obersee, Lake Constance
- Area: 0.0006 km^{2} (0.00023 sq mi)
- Length: 0.06 km (0.037 mi)
- Width: 0.01 km (0.006 mi)
- Highest elevation: 396 m (1299 ft)

Demographics
- Population: 0

The Vogelinsel is an island in Lake Constance with an area of around 600 square metres. It lies around 230 metres northwest of the mouth of the Leiblach opposite the Gemarkung of Reutin of the town of Lindau. On the island is the red mole beacon at the harbour entrance of the marina in Lindau-Zech. The island has been designated as a bird reserve.

According to BayernAtlas, the Vogelinsel does not belong to any plot of land or any Gemarkung and thus does not belong to the borough of Lindau. It is therefore not incorporated, but nevertheless is part of German territory, as it lies within the Halde, the area of Lake Constance up to a water depth of 25 metres.

== Nearby island ==
Another, even smaller, unnamed island (47°32′35.3″N 9°43′21.3″E) is located about 900 metres north of the aforementioned Vogelinsel, only about 50 metres west of the shore of the mainland. This island is also not incorporated and is roughly south of the Villa Leuchtenberg. It is an island under normal conditions. When the lake level rises only a tree rises above the water. At low water, there is a causeway to the nearby shore.

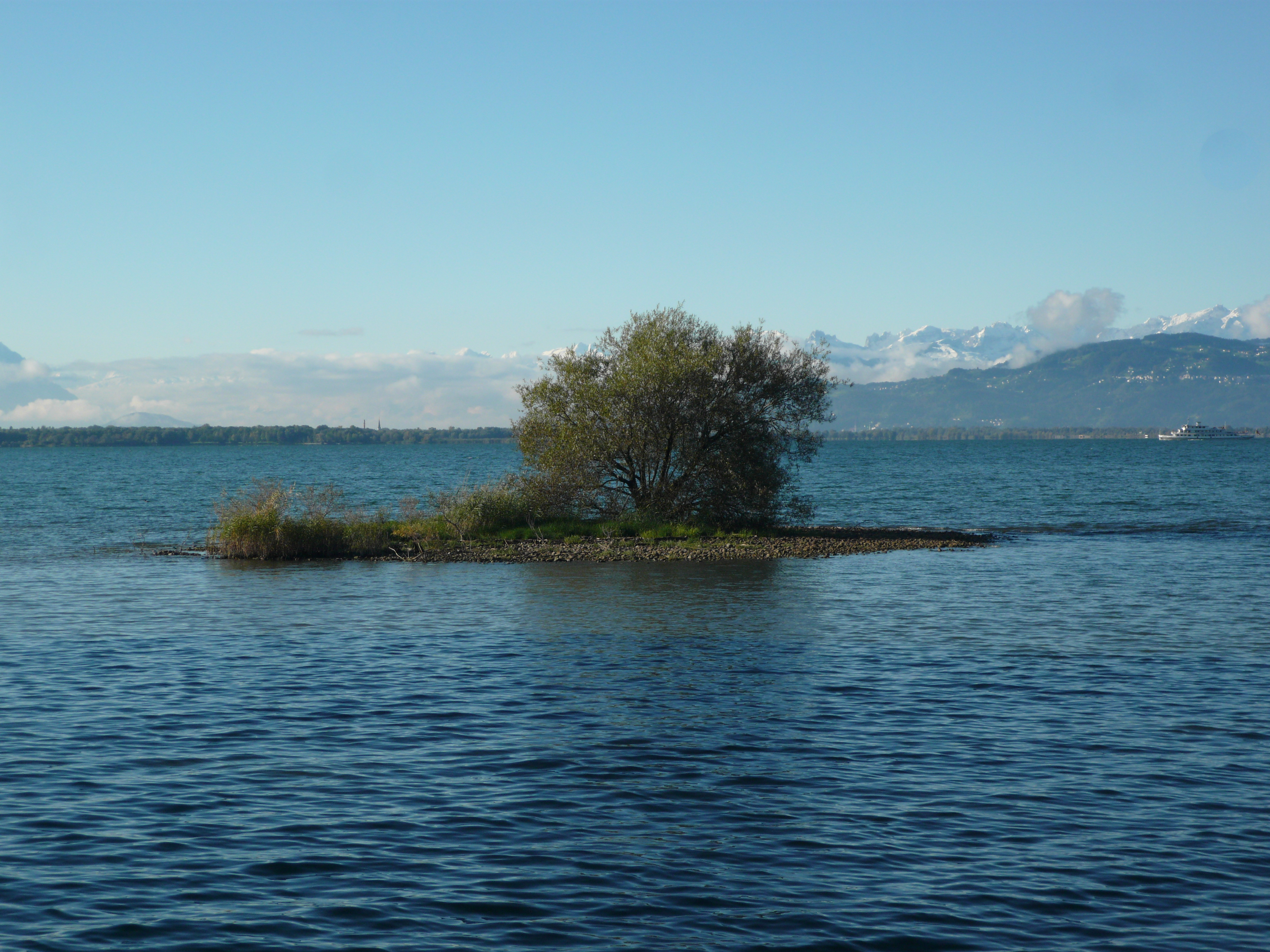
The small, unnamed island north of the Vogelinsel

== See also ==
- List of islands in Lake Constance
