= Heimenkirch station =

Railway station in Germany

Heimenkirch
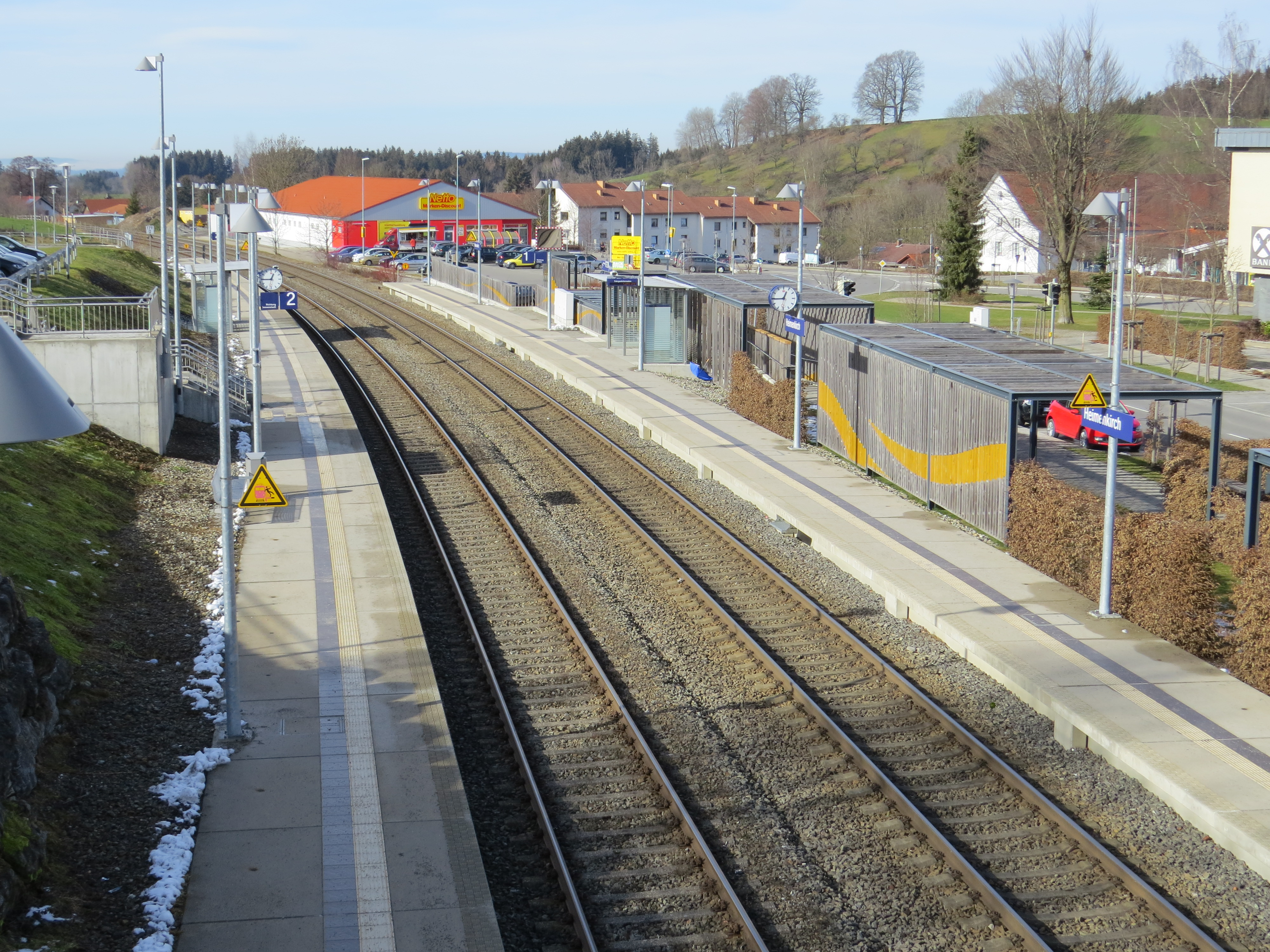

General information
- Location: 88178 Heimenkirch; Bayern; Germany
- Coordinates: 47.62898°N 9.901707°E
- System: Through station
- Owner: DB Netz
- Operator: DB Station&Service
- Lines: Buchloe–Lindau railway (KBS 970)
- Platforms: 2 side platform
- Tracks: 2
- Train operators: DB Regio Bayern

Construction
- Accessible: no

Other information
- Station code: 2659
- Category: 6
- Fare zone: Bodensee-Oberschwaben Verkehrsverbund: 470
- Website: www.bahnhof.de

Services
Preceding station	DB Regio Bayern	Following station
Hergatz towards Lindau-Insel	RE 7	Röthenbach (Allgäu) towards Nürnberg Hbf
Hergatz towards Lindau-Insel	RE 70	Röthenbach (Allgäu) towards München Hbf
Hergatz One-way operation	RE 75	Röthenbach (Allgäu) towards Ulm Hbf
Hergatz towards Hergatz or Lindau-Insel	RB 94	Röthenbach (Allgäu) towards Kempten Hbf
Location
- Location within Bavaria Location within Germany Location within Europe

Heimenkirch station is a railway station in the town of Heimenkirch, located in Bayern, Germany. It is owned and operated by Deutsche Bahn. The station lies on the Buchloe–Lindau railway and the train services are operated by DB Regio Bayern.

== Train services ==
The station is served by the following services:

Service		Route	Frequency	Operator
RE 7	Lindau-Reutin –	Lindau-Reutin – Heimenkirch – Kempten – Kaufbeuren – Buchloe – Augsburg (–Treuchtlingen – Nürnberg)	every two hours	DB Regio Bayern
RE 7	Lindau-Insel –	Lindau-Reutin – Heimenkirch – Kempten – Kaufbeuren – Buchloe – Augsburg (–Treuchtlingen – Nürnberg)	one train	DB Regio Bayern
RE 70	Lindau-Reutin – Heimenkirch – Kempten – Buchloe – Kaufering – München-Pasing – München		every two hours	DB Regio Bayern
RE 75	Lindau-Insel – Heimenkirch – Kempten – Memmingen – Senden – Ulm		one train Mo-Fr	DB Regio Bayern
RB 94	(Lindau-Insel –) Hergatz – Heimenkirch – Kempten		Individual services	DB Regio Bayern
