= Hergatz station =

Rail station in Hergatz, Bavaria, Germany

Hergatz
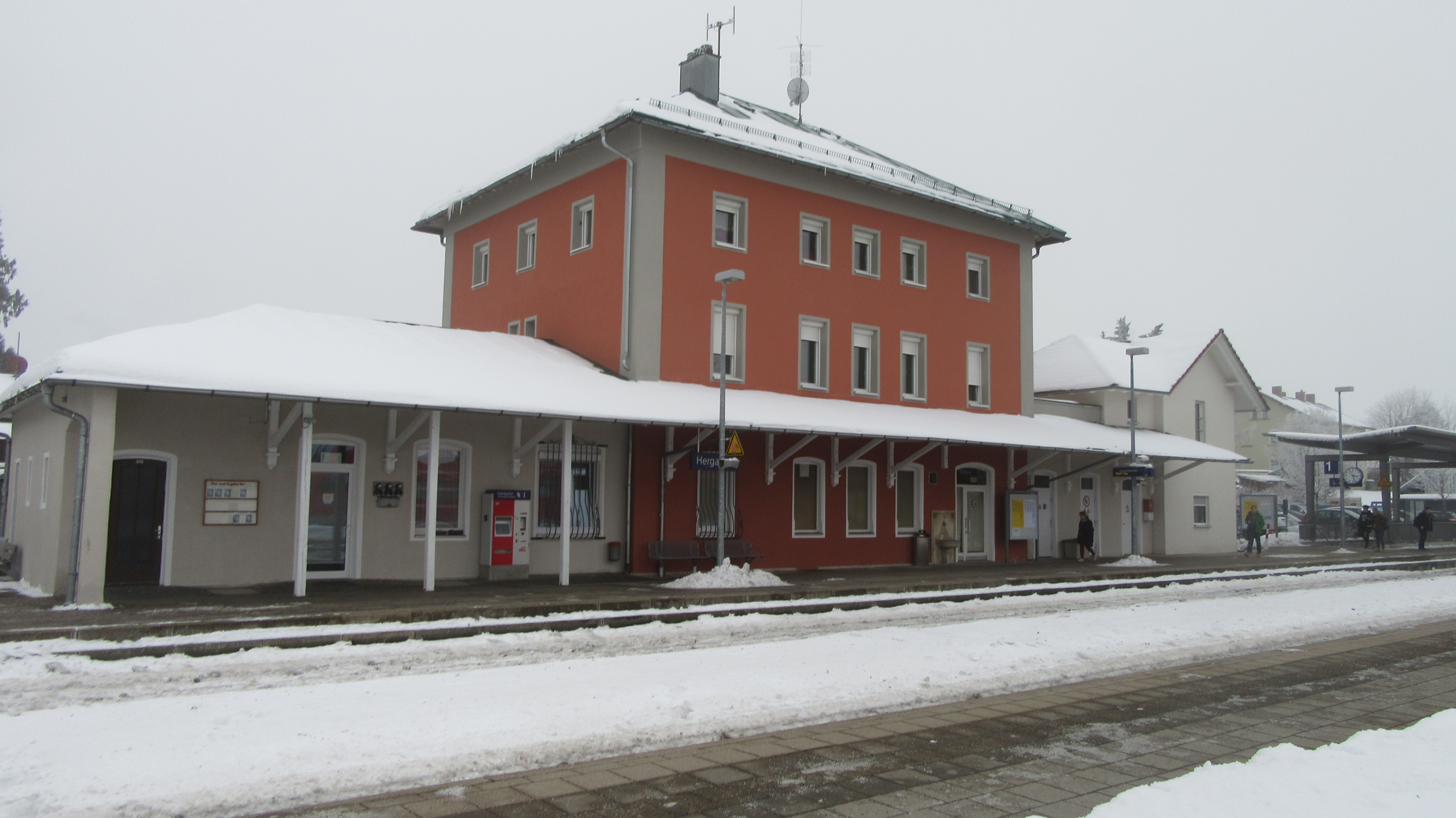
- Track side of the station building

General information
- Location: Hergatz, Bavaria; Germany
- Coordinates: 47°38′47″N 9°49′40″E
- Lines: Buchloe–Lindau (km 129.84) (KBS 970); Kißlegg–Hergatz (km 18.589) (KBS 985)
- Platforms: 3

Other information
- Station code: 2709
- DS100 code: MHGZ
- IBNR: 8000387
- Category: 6
- Fare zone: bodo: 441

History
- Opened: 12 October 1853

Services
Preceding station	DB Regio Bayern	Following station
Lindau-Insel Terminus	RE 7	Heimenkirch towards Nürnberg Hbf
Lindau-Reutin towards Lindau-Insel	RE 7	Heimenkirch towards Nürnberg Hbf
Lindau-Reutin towards Lindau-Insel	RE 70	Heimenkirch towards München Hbf
Lindau-Insel One-way operation	RE 75	Heimenkirch towards Ulm Hbf
Lindau-Insel Terminus	RB 94	Heimenkirch towards Kempten Hbf
Preceding station		Following station
Lindau-Insel towards Lindau-Reutin	RE 96	Wangen (Allgäu) towards München Hbf
Lindau-Insel towards Lindau-Reutin	RB 92	Wangen (Allgäu) towards Memmingen
Location
- Location within Bavaria Location within Germany Location within Europe

Hergatz station is the station of the Bavarian town of Hergatz. It has three platforms sidings and is classified by Deutsche Bahn as a category 5 station. The station is served by about 75 trains daily operated by Deutsche Bahn and Regentalbahn. Hergatz station is a separation station at the junction of the Buchloe–Lindau railway (Munich–Lindau) and the Kißlegg–Hergatz railway.

Apart from Hergatz station, the municipality of Hergatz includes the closed stations of Maria Thann and Wohmbrechts.

== Location ==
The station is located in the centre of Hergatz. The station building is located south of the tracks and has the address of Bahnhofstraße 4. Bahnhofstraße (station street) runs to the south of the station. The Hauptstraße (main street) crosses the tracks over a level crossing to the east of the station. To the west there is a pedestrian bridge.

== History ==
Hergatz station was opened on 12 October 1853 with the last section of the Bavarian Allgäu Railway from Oberstaufen to Lindau as part of the Ludwig South-North Railway. The opening of the section from Buchloe to Kaufering on 1 November 1872 created a direct connection with Munich. The station initially had five platform tracks and several freight tracks. It also had freight loading facilities and a freight shed. The three-storey station building was built with the construction of the Allgäu Railway and it has an annex at both ends. Tracks have been dismantled since 1970. The freight tracks were demolished and only three platform tracks remain for passenger traffic. Platforms were formerly reached over level crossings.

The station was modernised in 2003. The main platform was retained, but it was raised to 55 cm. The track work between tracks 2 and 3 was demolished and replaced by a large central platform, also 55 cm high. Both platforms were given canopies. An underpass was also built from the central platform to the main platform. Lift shafts were built but no lifts have been installed as the funding for this purpose has been cut by the federal government at stations with a daily ridership of less than 1,000 people. However, it is planned, with new financing, to install the lifts to give access to the central platform for the disabled. In 2012, Deutsche Bahn sold the station building to a private owner; the municipality of Hergatz refused to purchase it, despite an offer by Deutsche Bahn. It was unclear whether the station building would continue to be open to the public, now it is closed. In 1977, a Lorenz track plan push button interlocking of class 60 (SpDrL60) went into operation in Hergatz signal box which is located in the station building. It is expected to be replaced by an electronic interlocking controlled from Lindau in 2018.

== Infrastructure ==
The station has three tracks on two platforms. Track 1 is located on the main platform next to the station building and is used by trains towards Augsburg, Kempten and Munich. Track 2 is served by regional trains to Lindau and Kißlegg and infrequent Regionalbahn services via Aulendorf to Friedrichshafen run from track 3. All platforms are covered, but are not currently served by lifts so they are not accessible for the disabled. The central platform is connected by a subway to the main platform. All platforms at the station are 170 metres long and 55 cm high.

== Operations ==
Services as of 2024 are as follows:

Service		Route	Frequency
RE 7	Lindau-Reutin –	Hergatz – Kempten – Kaufbeuren – Buchloe – Augsburg (–Treuchtlingen – Nürnberg)	every two hours
RE 7	Lindau-Insel –	Hergatz – Kempten – Kaufbeuren – Buchloe – Augsburg (–Treuchtlingen – Nürnberg)	one train
RE 70	Lindau-Reutin – Hergatz – Kempten – Buchloe – Kaufering – München-Pasing – München		every two hours
RE 75	Lindau-Insel – Hergatz– Kempten – Memmingen – Senden – Ulm		one train Mon-Fri
RE 96	Lindau-Reutin – Lindau-Insel – Hergatz – Leutkirch – Memmingen – Buchloe – München-Pasing – München		every two hours
RB 92	Memmingen – Kißlegg – Wangen – Hergatz – Lindau-Insel		every two hours
RB 94	(Lindau-Insel –) Hergatz – Heimenkirch – Kempten		Some trains
