= Hergatz =

- Municipality
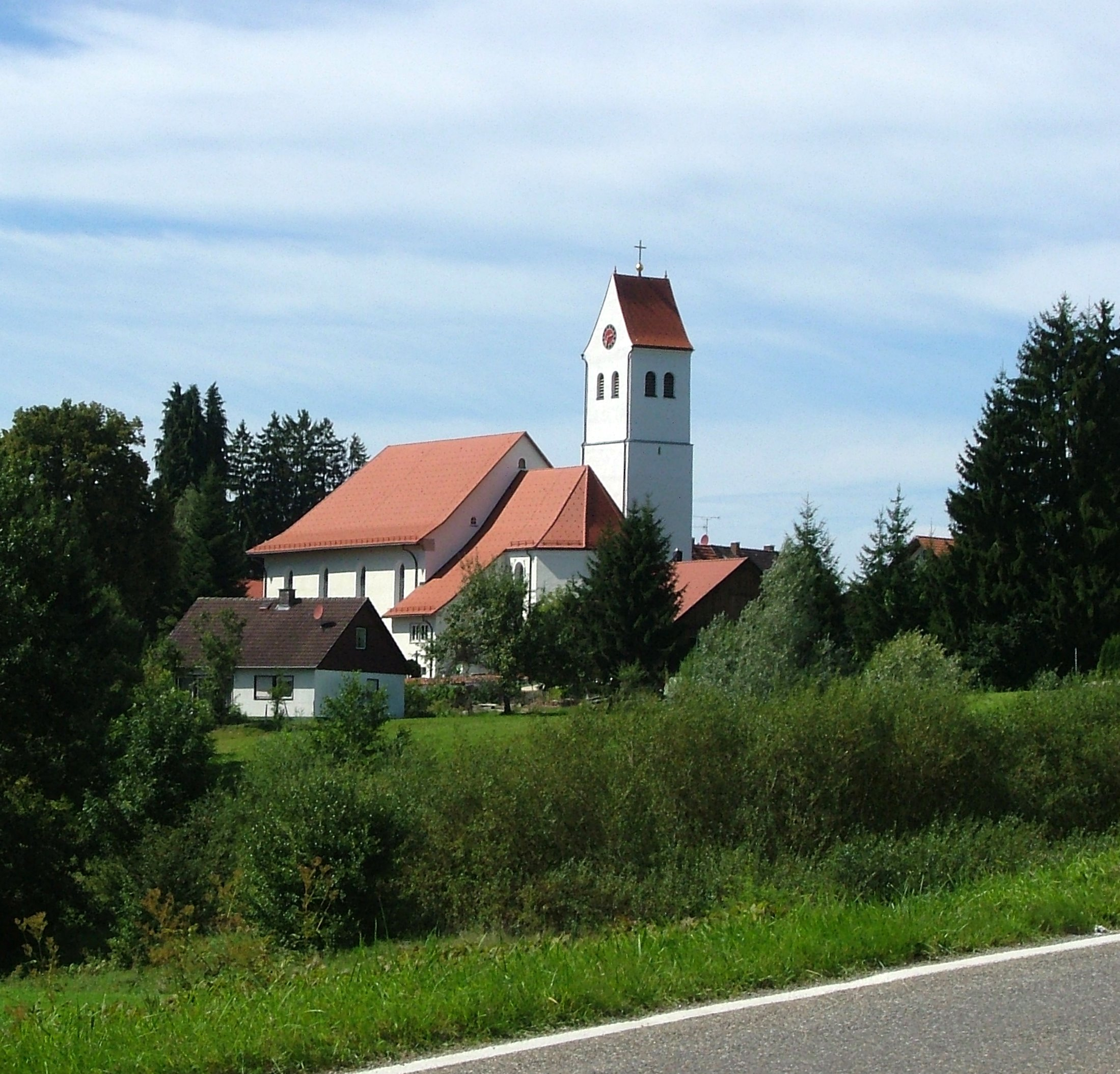
- Church of Saint George in Wohmbrechts

- Coat of arms

- Location of Hergatz within Lindau district
- Interactive map of Hergatz
- Location within Germany Location within Bavaria
- Coordinates: 47°39′N 9°50′E
- Country: Germany
- State: Bavaria
- Admin. region: Schwaben
- District: Lindau

Government
  - Mayor (2020–26): Oliver-Kersten Raab

Area
  - Total: 18.81 km^{2} (7.26 sq mi)
- Elevation: 550–630 m (1,800–2,070 ft)

Population (2025-12-31)
  - Total: 2,442
  - Density: 129.8/km^{2} (336.2/sq mi)
- Time zone: UTC+01:00 (CET)
  - Summer (DST): UTC+02:00 (CEST)
- Postal codes: 88145
- Dialling codes: 08385
- Vehicle registration: LI
- Website: www.hergatz.de

Hergatz is a municipality in the district of Lindau in Bavaria, Germany. The contemporary town was formed from the former municipalities of Wohmbrechts and Maria-Thann in the course of the municipal reform at the end of the 1970s.

== Geography ==
Hergatz is located in the Westallgäu.

The districts of Grod, Beuren, Möllen, Wohmbrechts and Hergatz are located at the Bundesstraße 12 (federal road 12) Munich - Lindau, approximately 20 km from Lindau. The B 12 forms a cross-town link in Wohmbrechts.

The districts of Grod, Staudach and Handwerks border on the upper Argen, a river, which rises north of Oberstaufen from several brooks, merges with the lower Argen near Neuravensburg and disembogues into Lake Constance near Langenargen. In Muthen, the railroad line crosses the small river Leiblach.

The Tyrolean salt road from Bad Reichenhall and Hall in Tirol to Lindau goes through the district of Wohmbrechts.

== Culture and infrastructure ==
In Hergatz the "westallgäuerische" dialect is spoken, with influences of the Swabian dialect.

=== Transport ===
Hergatz station, which is on the Buchloe–Lindau and Lindau-Kißlegg lines, is located in the district of Hergatz. Trains leave for Lindau, Aulendorf, Augsburg (through Memmingen) and München (through Kempten) every 1–2 hours. In former times, there also were stopping places in the districts of Wohmbrechts and Maria-Thann.
