= Kißlegg–Hergatz railway =

Railway line in Germany

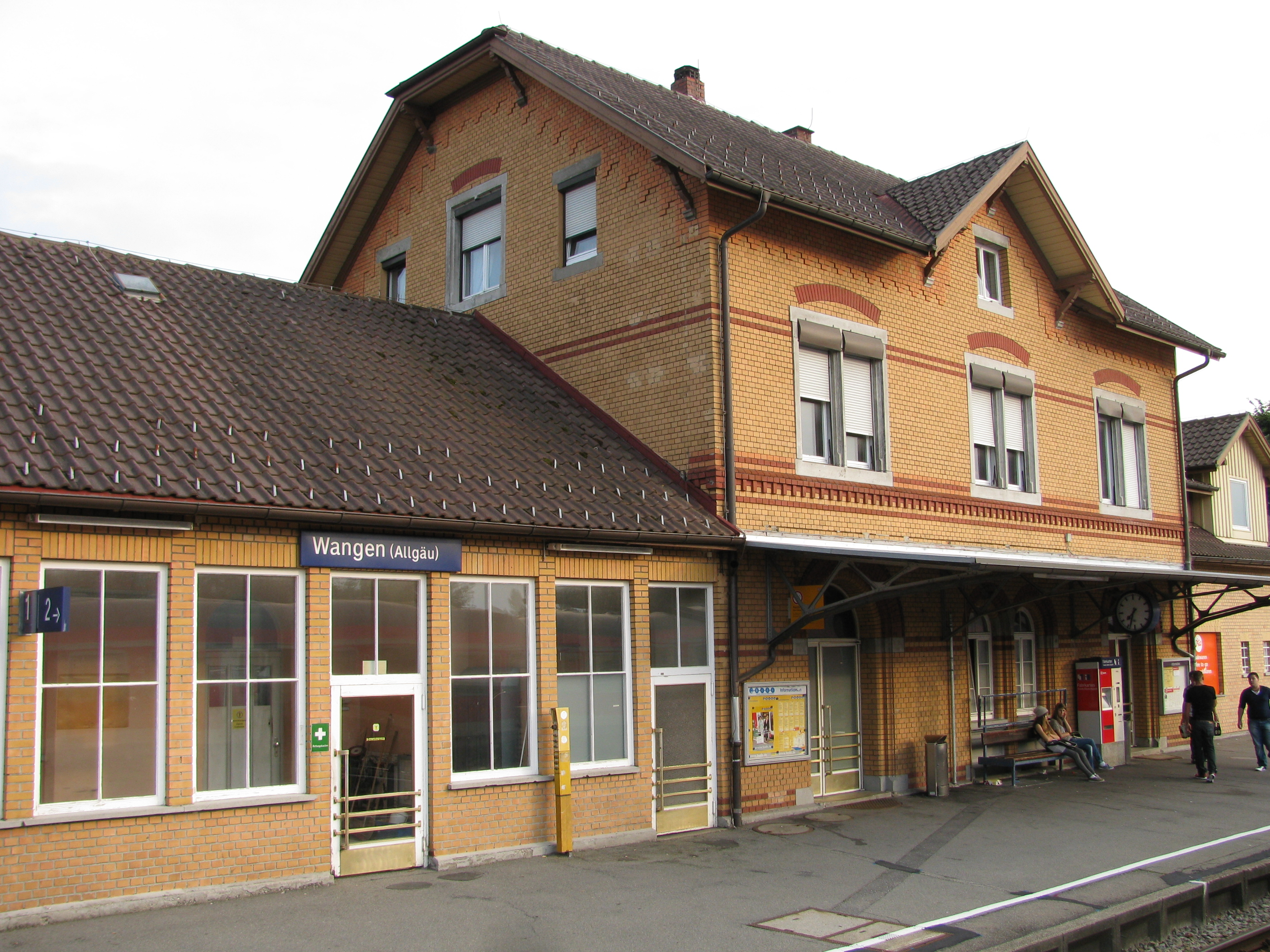
- Wangen (Allgäu) station

Overview
- Line number: 4560
- Locale: Baden-Württemberg and Bavaria, Germany

Service
- Route number: 753/971; 316e (1944)

Technical
- Line length: 18.589 km (11.551 mi)
- Track gauge: 1,435 mm (4 ft 8 1/2 in) standard gauge
- Minimum radius: 293 m (961 ft)
- Electrification: 15 kV 16.7 Hz AC
- Operating speed: 100 km/h (62 mph)

The Kißlegg–Hergatz railway is an 18.589 km long standard gauge main line that runs through the Allgäu in the German states of Baden-Württemberg and Bavaria. It forms part of the Munich–Lindau upgraded line, which was completed in 2020.

It runs from Kißlegg via Wangen to Hergatz and connects the Herbertingen–Isny railway (also known as the Württembergische Allgäubahn—Württemberg Allgäu Railway) with the Buchloe–Lindau railway (also known as the Bayerische Allgäubahn—Bavarian Allgäu Railway). It has been electrified since 2020 and is single-track throughout. It is operated by Deutsche Bahn and is listed in its timetable as part of route number 753 from Aulendorf to Hergatz, which is alternatively called the Württemberg-Allgäu-Bahn (Allgäu-Württemberg Railway) and part of route number 971 from Augsburg to Lindau. The Kißlegg–Wangen section is integrated in the network of the Bodensee-Oberschwaben Verkehrsverbund (Lake Constance-Upper Swabia Transport Association, bodo).

== History ==
Although Hergatz was connected to the Bavarian rail network in 1853 and Kißlegg was connected to the Württemberg network in 1870, Wangen lacked any connection. In 1876, it was decided to build the 13.3 kilometre line to Kißlegg, which was opened on 31 July 1880. In 1887, a treaty was contracted between Württemberg and Bavaria for the construction of the 5.3 km line between Wangen and Hergatz along with a line from Leutkirch to Memmingen. The Wangen–Hergatz section went into operation on 15 July 1890. Since its completion the new link has provided a shorter route from Munich to Lindau than the Buchloe–Kempten–Lindau railway.

Electrical operations began at the 2020/21 timetable change.

== Operations ==
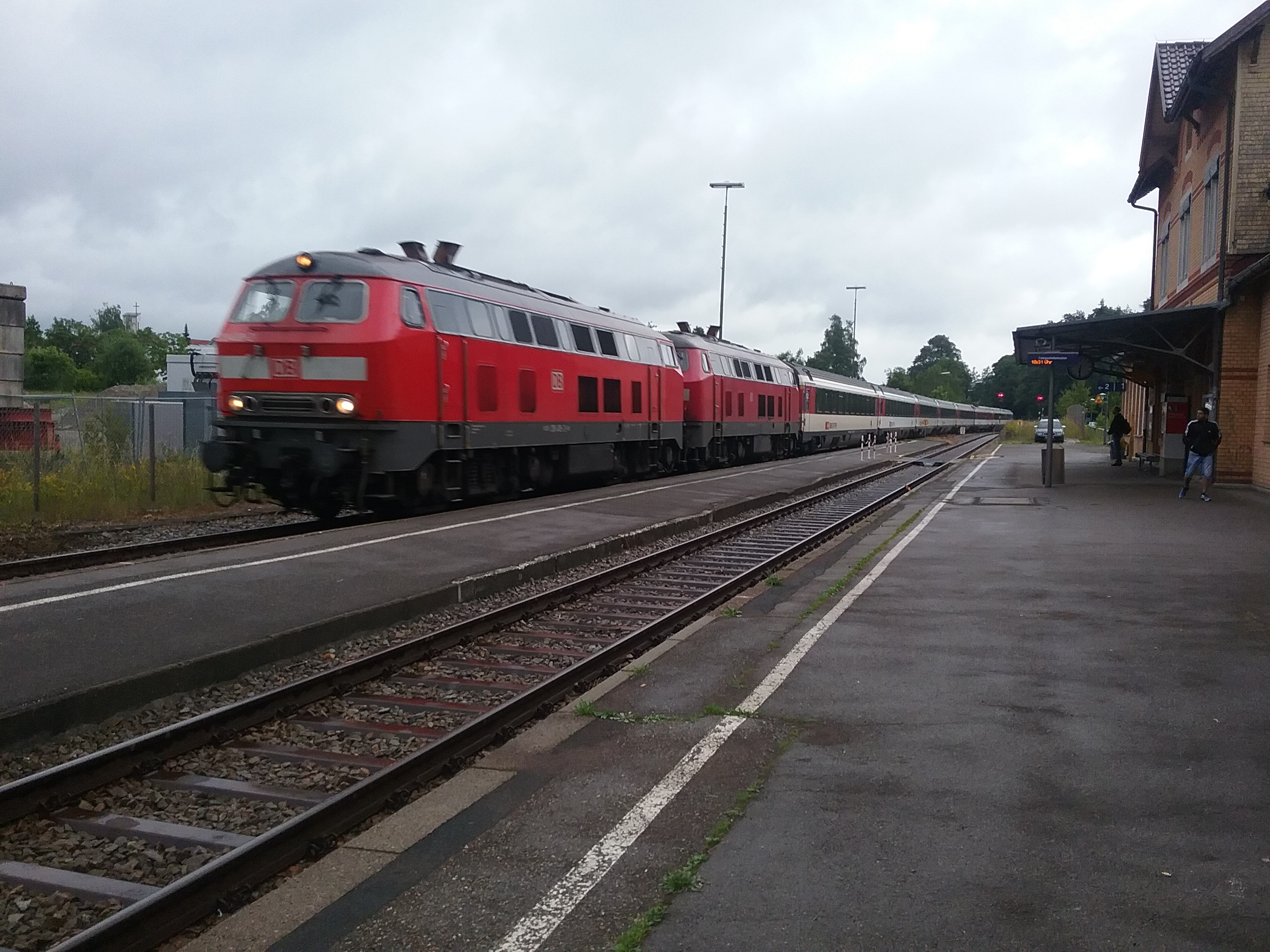
Passing Eurocity in Wangen station

In 2020, three pairs of Eurocity services hauled by class 218 locomotives ran from Munich to Zurich (some to/from Basel) via Memmingen and Lindau without stopping.

Since 13 December 2020, all EC services between Munich and Zurich, six pairs of trains per day each way, have been operated by SBB electric multiple units.

The line is served by two services operated by Go-Ahead Bayern, the RE 96 (Munich–Buchloe–Memmingen–Kißlegg–Wangen–Hergatz–Lindau-Insel–Lindau-Reutin and the RB 92 (Memmingen–Kißlegg–Wangen–Hergatz–Lindau-Insel). Both services run every two hours, together providing an hourly service to all stations.

During the day, the RB 53 service runs every two hours, conveying local traffic on the Aulendorf–Kißlegg–Wangen route, operated with Stadler Regio-Shuttle RS1 (class 650) railcars (previously class 628 railcars).
