= Hoy (Lake Constance) =

Artificial island in Germany

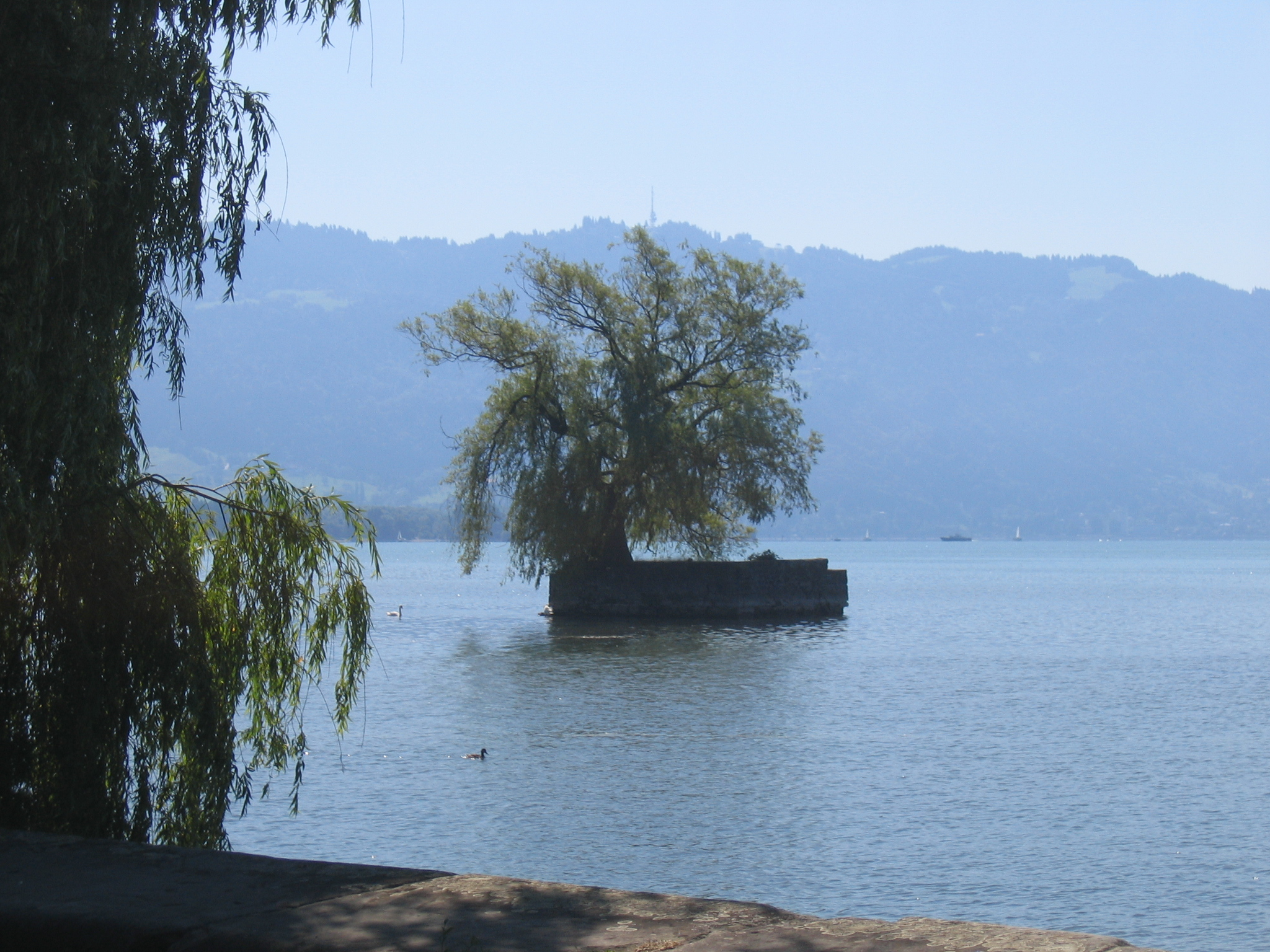
- Hoy seen from the Lindau shore. Behind: the Pfänder

Geography
- Coordinates: 47°32′57.43″N 9°41′48.16″E
- Adjacent to: Bay of Reutin, Obersee, Lake Constance
- Area: 0.000053 km^{2} (2.0×10^{−5} sq mi)
- Length: 0.009 km (0.0056 mi)
- Width: 0.006 km (0.0037 mi)

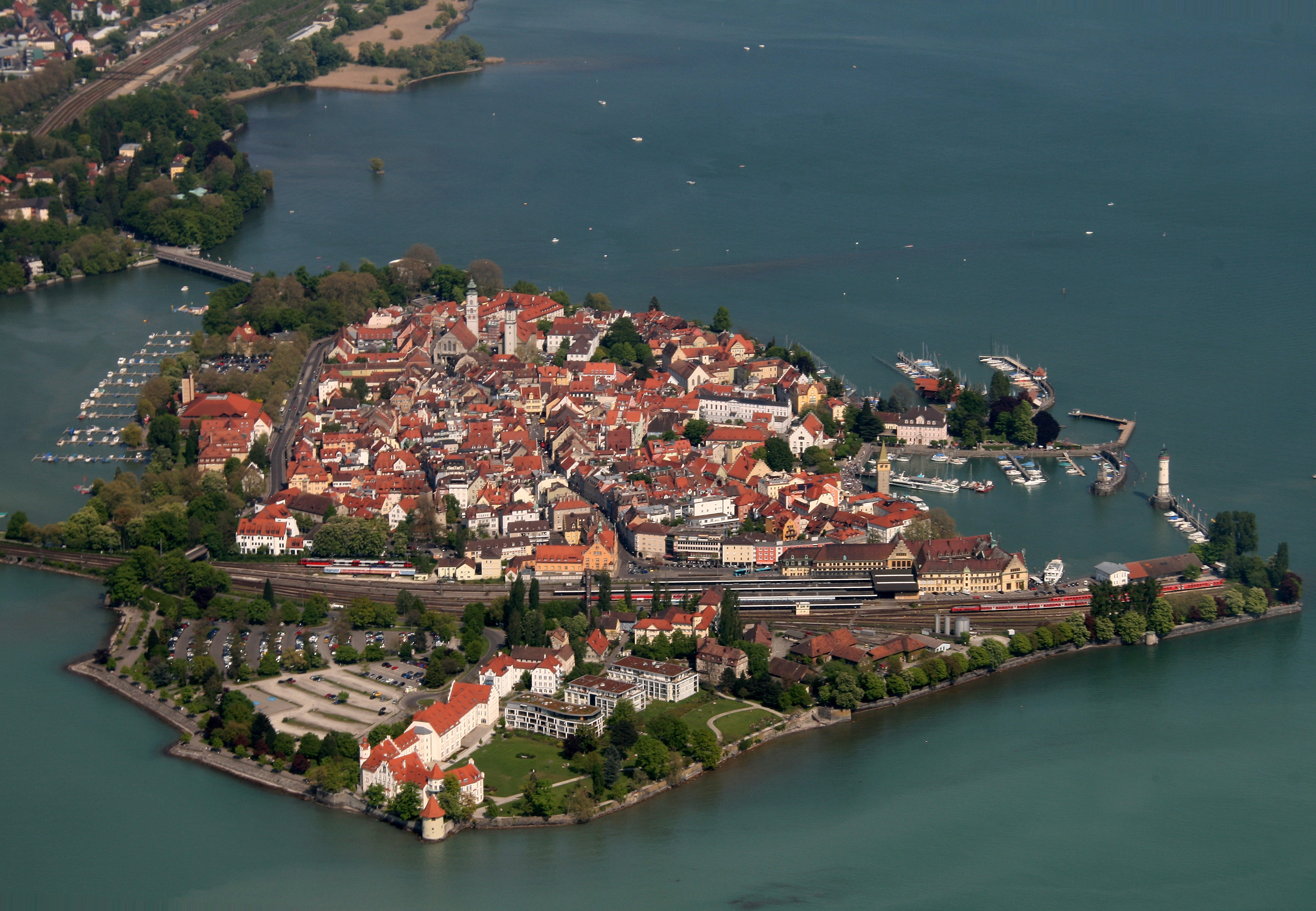
Hoy visible above the island of Lindau

Hoy is an uninhabited island in Lake Constance in Germany. It lies 400 metres east of the island of Lindau in the Bay of Reutin and 100 metres south of the lakeshore near the mouth of the Oberreitnauer Ach (Lindauer Ach). With an area of 53 square metres it is the smallest island in Lake Constance.

== Geography ==
=== Description ===
The island is roughly rectangular in shape, with a length of nine metres and a width of five to six metres. The shore of the island is enclosed by a wall, the top of which is 2 metres above the surface of the lake. The soil is very sandy. It covers an area of 53 m². The island of Hoy is part of the quarter and Gemarkung of Reutin in the borough of Lindau, which, until 1922, was an independent municipality. A weeping willow tree dominated the tiny island, its crown covering most of the surface area; however, in 2019, a storm broke the main trunk. In 2022, the town planted a new willow on the island as the old one was deemed to be at the end of its life.

=== Nature reserve ===
Hoy and the surrounding Bay of Reutin (Reutiner Bucht) is designated as a nature reserve, the Bayerisches Bodenseeufer, with an area of 221 hectares. It is also part of the bird reserve, Bayerisches Bodensee.

It has certain similarities with an artificial island in the lake of Chiemsee, the Schalch, which is also in Bavaria.

== History ==
According to locals, Hoy is occasionally (but incorrectly) called Galgeninsel ("Gallows Island"), but the real Galgeninsel, a former imperial execution site, lies 550 metres further east and has been a peninsula since the mid-19th century.

In reality, Hoy is a small artificial island, which was built by the then owner of the nearby Villa Seeheim (on the left, eastern bank of the Lindauer Ach river, opposite the town council offices). Construction was started on 20 February 1922 and, in 1934, the completion of the island was celebrated with the raising of a flag, singing and speeches.

The island was used in the years that followed as a private bathing island; it also had a bathing hut, built by councillor of commerce Egg in 1934; it was burned down in 1945 by two youths playing on the island.

In 1973 Hoy was acquired by the Bavarian State Government who gave it to the town of Lindau in 2009 to administer.

The island is still used by swimmers today as a "bathing island".
