= Galgeninsel =

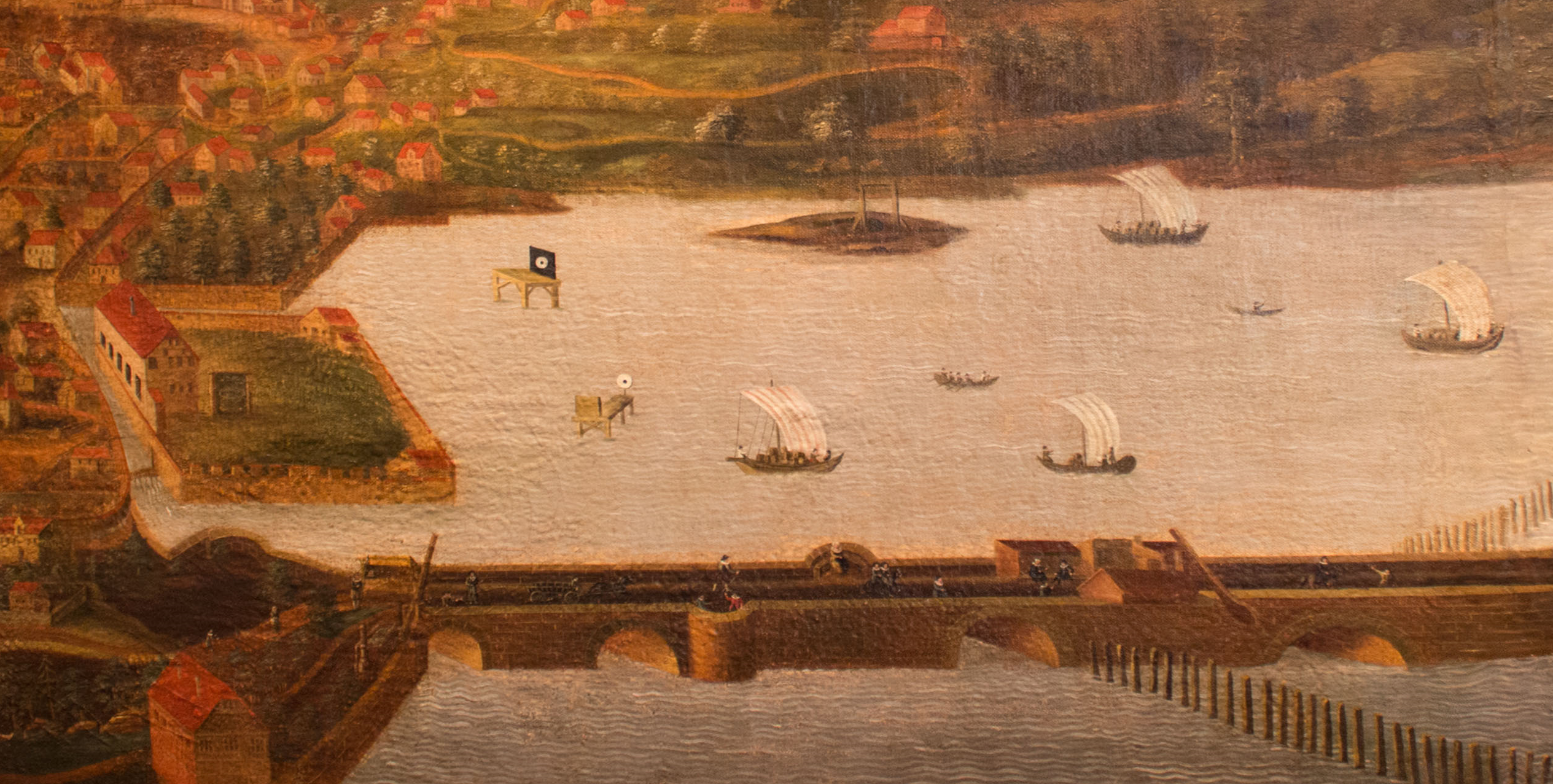
- The Galgeninsel. Foreground: the bridge in Lindau. Antoni Remm, 1579
- Interactive map of Galgeninsel

Geography
- Coordinates: 47°33′00″N 9°42′14″E
- Adjacent to: Bay of Reutin, Obersee, Bodensee
- Area: 0.0016 km^{2} (0.00062 sq mi)
- Length: 0.066 km (0.041 mi)
- Width: 0.046 km (0.0286 mi)

Administration
- Germany

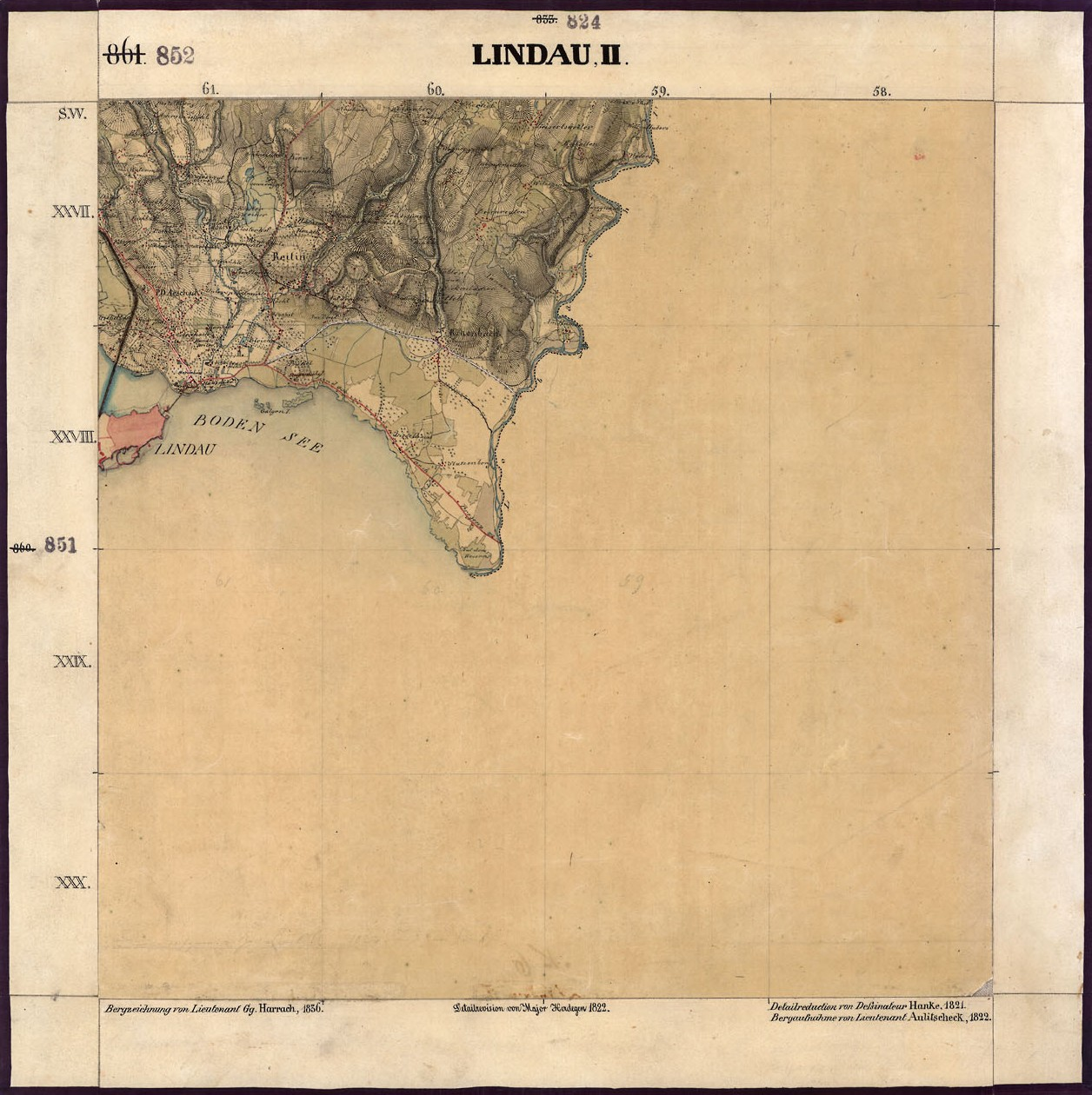
1836 map showing the Galgeninsel still clearly as an island

The Galgeninsel is a peninsula on the shore of Lake Constance near Lindau in the Bay of Reutin in Germany.

== Geography ==
The Galgeninsel peninsula lies 550 metres (1,800 ft) east of the island of Hoy and about 200 metres (660 ft) south of the loading sidings of Reutin's goods yard, and covers an area of around 1,600 square metres (17,000 sq ft). The territory of the peninsula belongs to the borough of Lindau and Gemarkung of Reutin.

== History ==
The Galgeninsel was originally the island on which the gallows of the Free Imperial City of Lindau stood. Even today, a hole can be seen in a mighty stone block which once held the heavy gallows post. A 16th-century map still shows the Galgeninsel as an island, but not in the correct geographical location. A view of the town dating to the early 18th century gives no indication of whether it was an island or peninsula at that time, because it only appears at the edge of the picture. An 1836 map still clearly shows the Galgeninsel as an island or several islands. Later maps show the Galgeninsel as a peninsula. By 1856, the remains of a prehistoric settlement were observed in the lake near the Galgeninsel. More recent investigations, as part of the planned expansion of the goods year in 2005, did not yield archaeological finds however. The Galgeninsel and the surrounding Reutiner Bucht have been designated as a Naturschutzgebiet.

The last person to be sentenced as a result of the witch trials in Lindau was Maria Madlener. She was executed by sword on 4 August 1730 on the Galgeninsel.

In 2017 the Galgeninsel was the setting of the German TV film, Die Toten vom Bodensee – Der Wiederkehrer.

== Literature ==
- Pflederer, Tobias (2005). ""Forschung in der Forschungslücke" – Unterwasserarchäologie im bayerischen Teil des Bodensees" (PDF). Nachrichtenblatt Arbeitskreis Unterwasserarchäologie (in German). 11–12. Janus: 71–75. Archived from the original (PDF) on 6 April 2024.
