= Lindau (island) =

Island in Germany

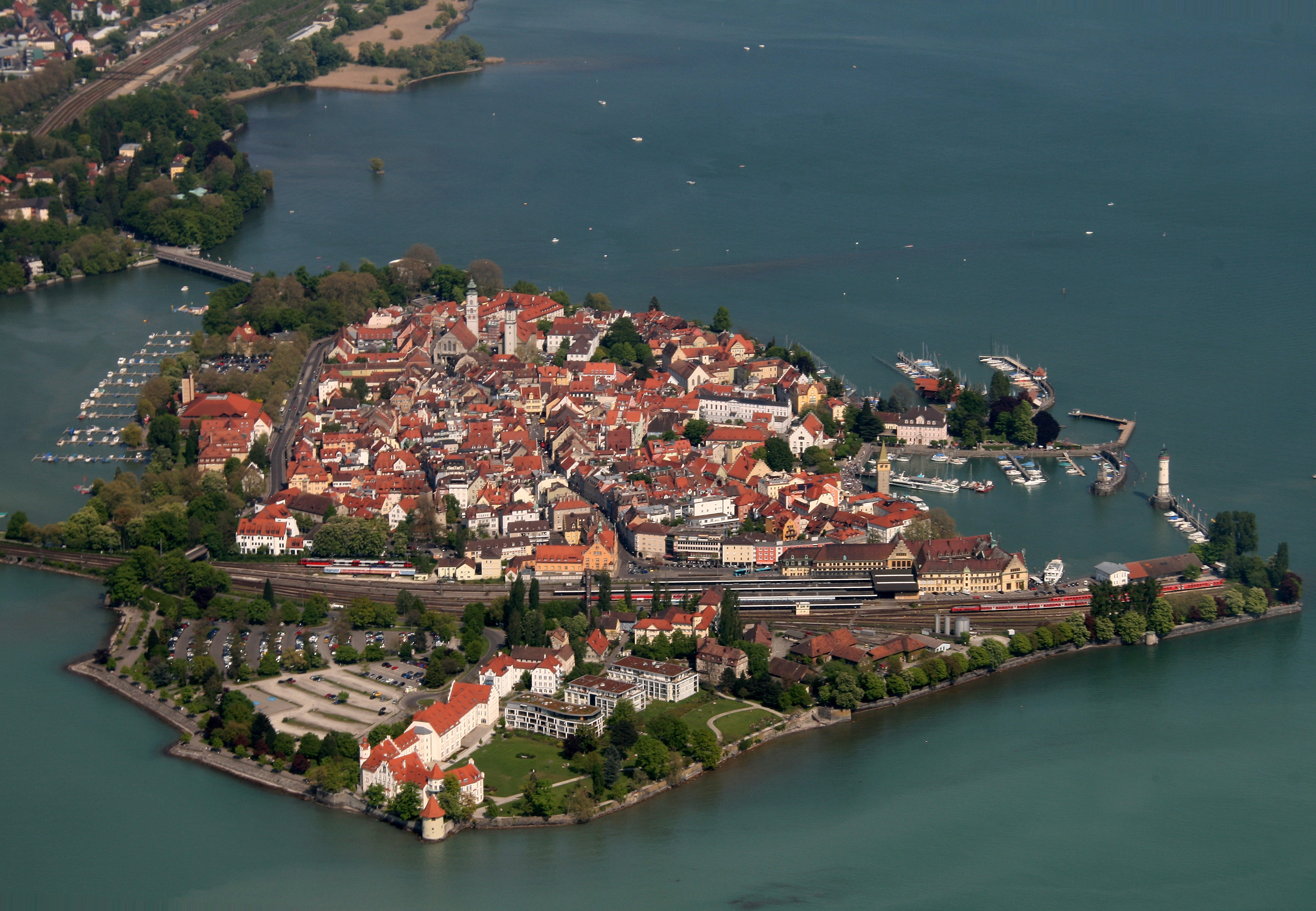
- The island of Lindau from the west
- Interactive map of Lindau

Geography
- Location: Insel (district)
- Coordinates: 47°32′44″N 09°40′58″E
- Adjacent to: Obersee, Lake Constance
- Area: 0.68 km^{2} (0.26 sq mi)
- Length: 1.3 km (0.81 mi)
- Width: 0.666 km (0.4138 mi)
- Highest elevation: 402 m (1319 ft)

Administration
- Germany

Demographics
- Population: 3000

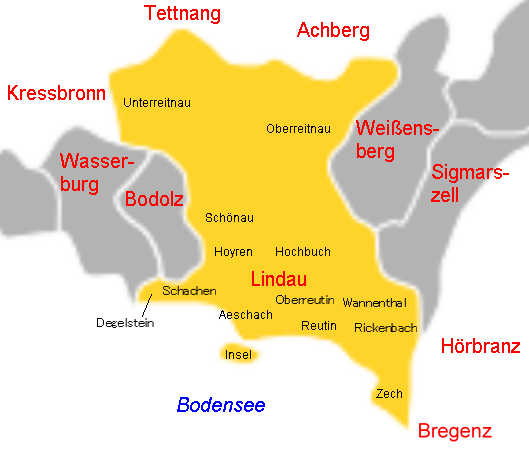
Location of the island within Lindau

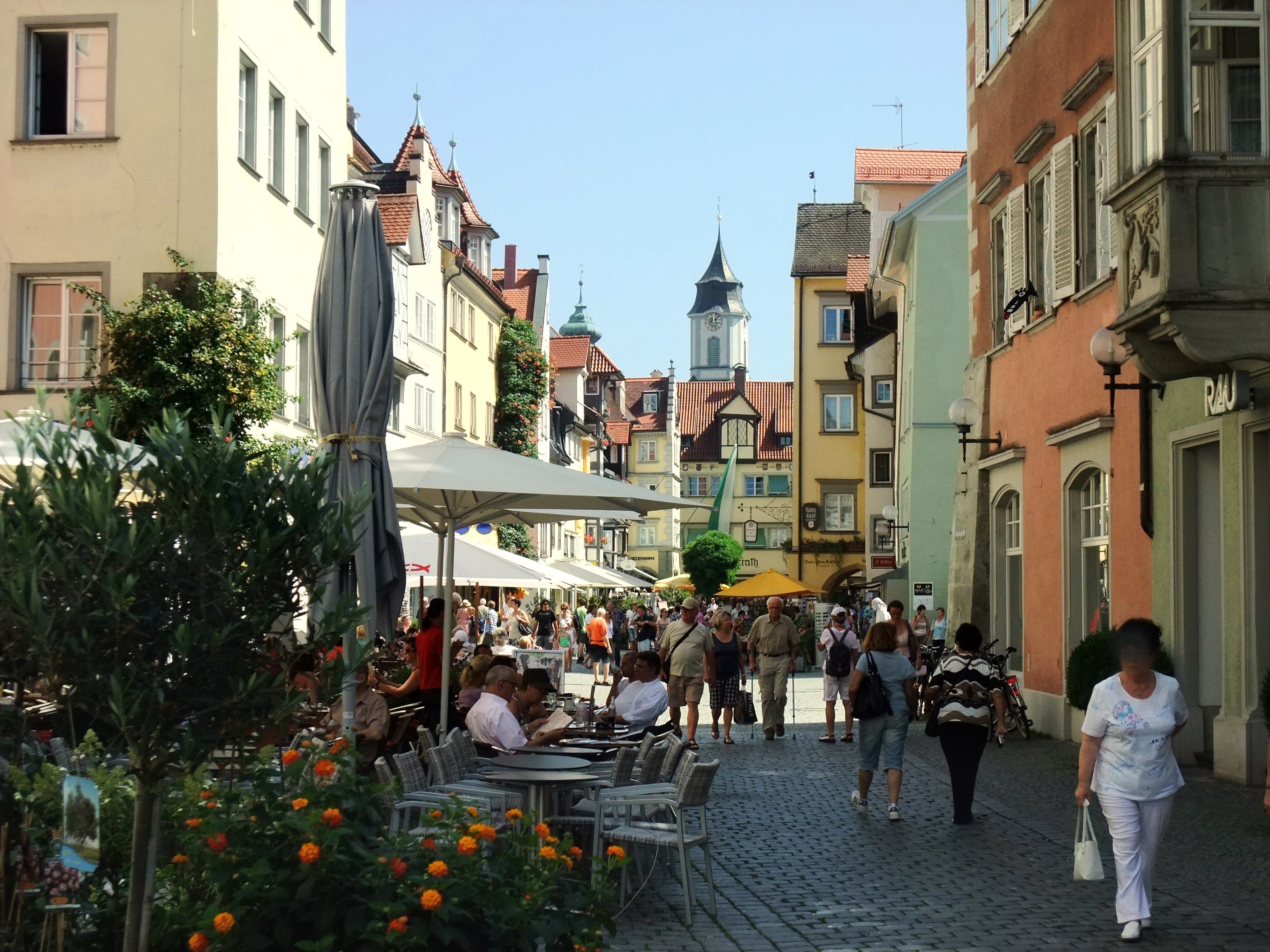
Maximilianstraße

On the island of Lindau (German pronunciation: [ˈlɪndaʊ]) in the eastern Lake Constance is the Altstadt of the Bavarian county town of Lindau, which occupies the eastern part of the island. The island of Lindau, which forms 2% of the area and 12% of the population of the entire town, is one of the town's ten administrative districts. The district is just called Insel ("Island").

== History ==
The present island of Lindau originally consisted of three separate islands, which were formed by the moraine of the Rhine Glacier:

1. Vordere Insel or Hauptinsel ("Anterior Island" or "Main Island") with Lindau's Altstadt east of the historical town wall, separated from the Hintere Insel by the town ditch
2. Hintere Insel ("Far Island") west of the old town ditch with the present-day station and tracks
3. Römerschanze ("Roman Schanze") or Auf Burg ("On the Castle"), the smallest of the former islands, in front of the subsequent harbour on the south side

On an 1822 map (long before the construction of the railway, which opened in 1854) the three individual islands can be made out:

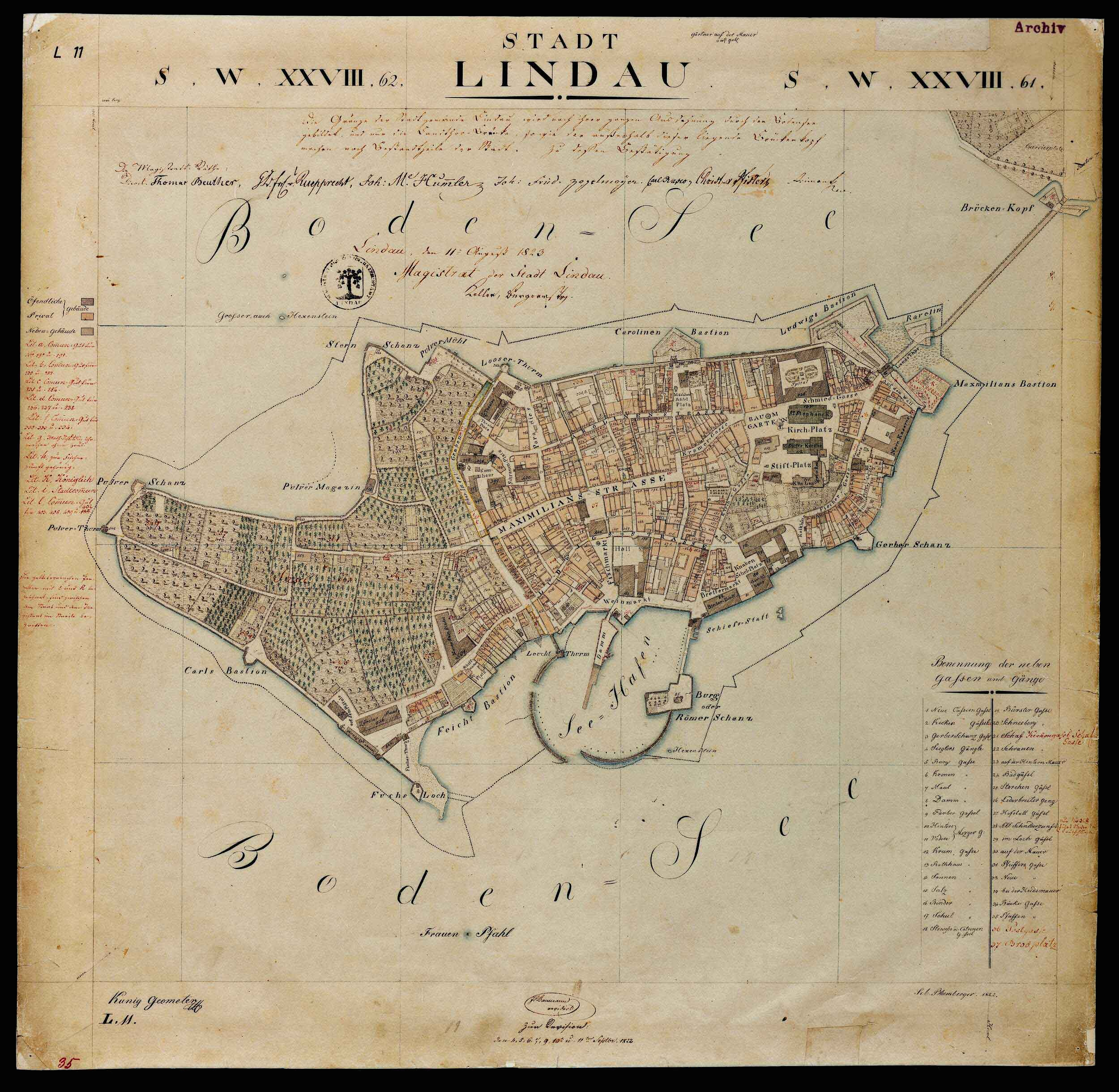
1822 map of the island of Lindau

Even in 1831 it was said that: the little town of Lindau lies on three islands in Lake Constance, linked by bridges…

The remaining history of the island of Lindau is inextricably bound up with the history of the town of Lindau itself.

== Geography ==
The island of Lindau currently has about 3,000 inhabitants on an area of 68 hectares (0.68 km²). The last official figures from the population census of 25 May 1987 gave the population as 2755, making Lindau the second-largest island in Lake Constance after Reichenau in terms of area and population. For centuries, Lindau was the most populous island and it was only after the decline in population in the old town in the late 1980s that it passed the baton to Reichenau at the other end of the lake, which was six times the size and more rural in character. In the 1970 census, the island's population was still 4,413, and in 1904 as much as 5,853.

The island is separated from the Lindau quarter of Aeschach on the mainland by the Kleiner See. The Kleiner See is bounded in the east by the 150-metre-long Landtor Bridge (Landtorbrücke), over which the Chelles Allee runs, and in the west by the 410-metre-long railway causeway and covers an area of around 20 hectares. There was a bridge at this spot as early as the 13th century; by contrast the railway embankment was built in the 19th century. The railway causeway carries four tracks and has a heavily used cycleway and footpath on its eastern side. It has two bridges under which boats may pass. The railway running over the causeway from Aeschach to the island of Lindau was the last section of the Ludwig South-North Railway, to be taken into operation. It was opened on 1 March 1854 as part of the Buchloe–Lindau railway.

The old town of Lindau, which is a listed monument, occupies the large eastern part of the island of Lindau, also known as the "main island" (Hauptinsel). In the centre is the main street of Maximilianstraße with the two gable fronts of the town hall on the Reichsplatz. Parallel to Maximilianstraße there is the Ludwigstraße in the south and the Grub in the north. The curvature of both roads enables the line of the medieval fortifications of the island to be seen. The smaller formerly separate island of Hintere Insel is located west of the historical town wall and the old moat. This rear part of the island was enlarged around 1970 by a good four hectares, by the reclamation of an area of the lake between the Pulverschanze and the Sternschanze. It now covers an area of eleven hectares, about one sixth of the island and is dominated by the Lake Constance Clinic of ENT physician and cosmetic surgeon, Werner Mang. The westernmost point of the Hintere Insel and of the whole island is marked by the 1508 Powder Tower and the former Luitpold-Kaserne built in 1902/03.
