= Buchloe–Lindau railway =

Railway line in Bavaria

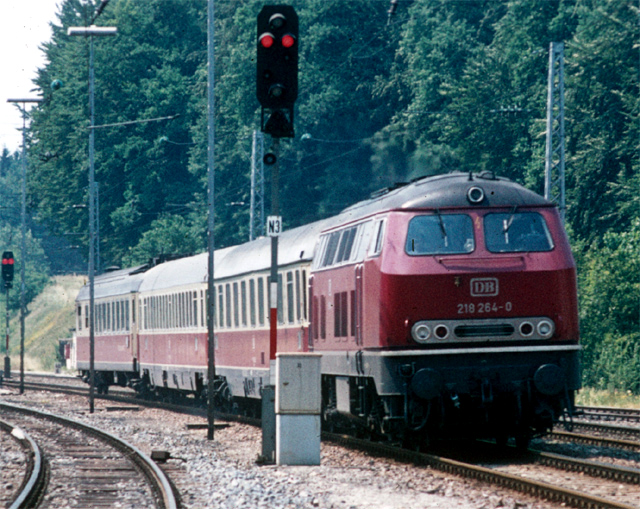
- Class 218 with TEE 66 in Geltendorf

Overview
- Native name: Bayerische Allgäubahn
- Line number: 5362
- Locale: Bavaria, Germany

Service
- Route number: 970

Technical
- Line length: 152.938 km (95.031 mi)
- Num of tracks: 2
- Track gauge: 1,435 mm (4 ft 8 1/2 in) standard gauge
- Minimum radius: 273 m (896 ft)
- Electrification: 15 kV/16.7 Hz AC overhead catenary (Hergatz–Lindau-Aeschach)
- Operating speed: 160 km/h (99 mph)
- Maximum incline: 1.0%

The Buchloe–Lindau railway is a double-track, largely non-electrified main line in the German state of Bavaria. It runs through the Allgäu from Buchloe to Lindau in Lake Constance via Kaufbeuren and Kempten. Together with the connecting Munich–Buchloe railway it is known in German as the Bayerische Allgäubahn (Bavarian Allgäu railway).

The Royal Bavarian State Railways (Königlich Bayerischen Staatseisenbahnen) put the line into operation between 1847 and 1854 as part of the Ludwig South-North Railway (Ludwig-Süd-Nord-Bahn). The Hergatz–Lindau section was electrified between 2018 and 2020 as part of the Munich–Lindau upgraded line project, which uses a shorter but largely single-track route via Memmingen.

== History ==
The line from Buchloe to Lindau was built as part of the Ludwig South-North Railway from Hof via Augsburg and Kempten to Lindau. The first 20.3 km (12.6 mi) from Buchloe to Kaufbeuren were opened to traffic on 1 September 1847. This was followed by the 42.52 km (26.42 mi) over the King Louis Bridge (König-Ludwig-Brücke, later replaced by the Upper Iller bridge—Obere Illerbrücke) to the former Kempten terminus on 1 April 1852. The 21.66 km to Immenstadt were added on 1 May 1853. Another 16.85 km (10.47 mi) section to Oberstaufen were inaugurated on 1 September 1853 and the next 49.8 km (30.9 mi) to the Lindau suburb of Aeschach on 12 October 1853. The last 1.8 km (1.1 mi) section from Aeschach via the Lake Constance embankment to Lindau-Insel station, formerly named Lindau Stadt (Lindau town), terminus on the island of Lindau finally went into operation on 1 March 1854. Duplication of the original single track was completed in 1907.

Until the journey times between Munich and Lindau was reduced by around 30 minutes with the introduction of DB Class V 200 diesel locomotives in the mid-1960s, the line was operated with steam locomotives. The former Bavarian S 3/6 (later class 18) locomotives provided high-quality, international express train services here for many decades. They were still used for express services at the end of 1967.

From 23 May 1954 to 31 May 1958, railway buses ran from Augsburg and Biessenhofen via Pforzen, continuing for a short time to run by rail to Roßhaupten, before reaching Füssen by road.

The Bundesbahn Central Offices tested almost every diesel locomotive class was on the line because of its hilly profile. These included the one-off 232 001 (later class V 320 001), which was subsequently operated as Deutsche Bundesbahn's only six-axle diesel locomotive.

From 1975, Deutsche Bundesbahn intended to electrify the route between Munich and Lindau, although this was not implemented. The relocation of Lindau station to the mainland had already been considered at that time as it would make sense if a new railway tunnel was built through the Alps. The then planned Splügen Railway (Splügenbahn) formed the background for the planning of the electrification and its timing. Switzerland in particular wanted to use the Munch–Memmingen–Lindau route as an important access route for this unrealised Alpine crossing.

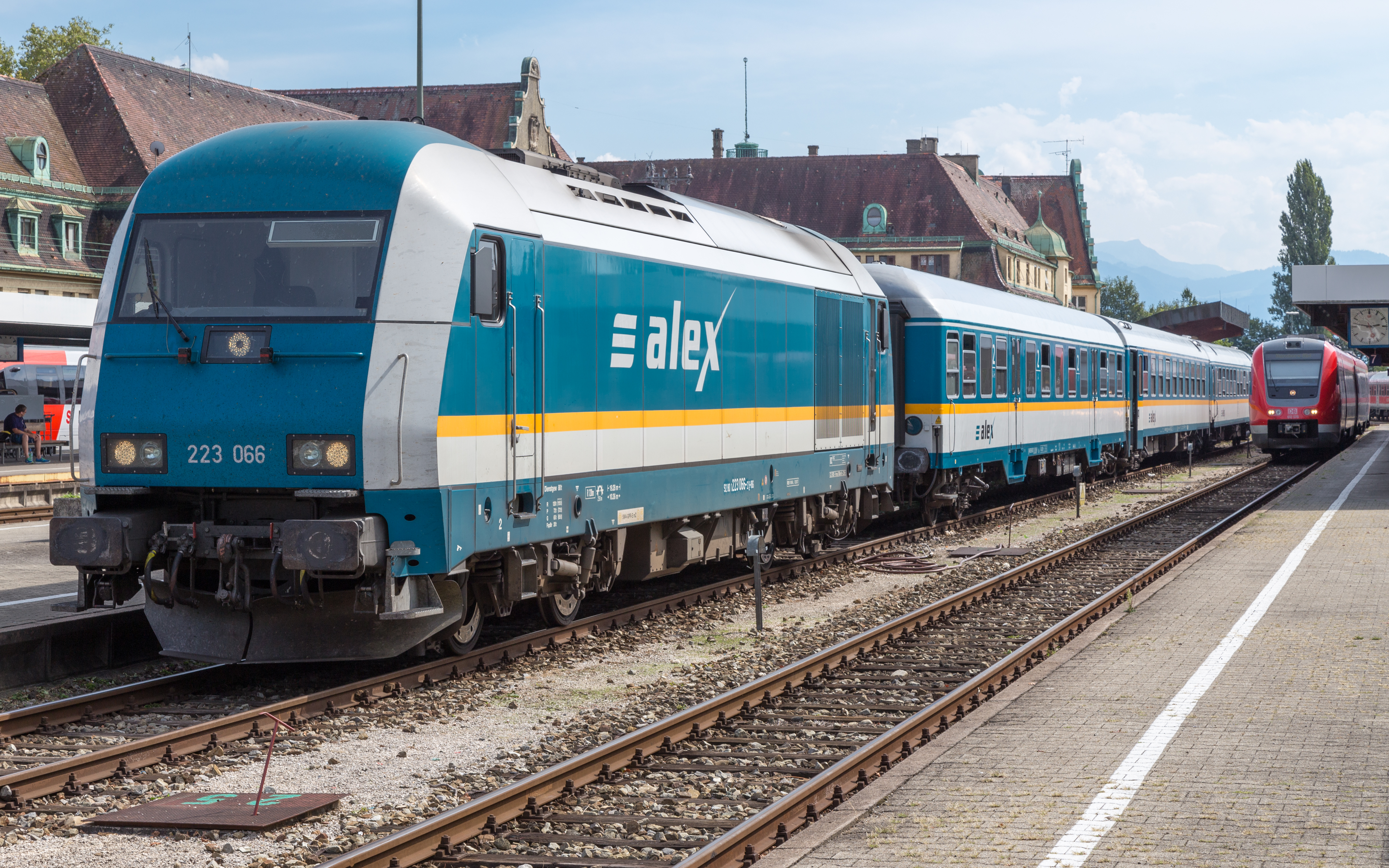
alex in Lindau

Die Länderbahn operated a service known as the Allgäu-Express on the line from the end of 2003, initially in partnership with the Swiss Federal Railways. It was called the Arriva-Länderbahn-Express from 2007 to 2010 and then the alex until the end of its concession on 13 December 2020.

Heimenkirch station was reopened with the timetable change on 12 December 2010.

Since the beginning of 2011, individual sections of the Buchloe–Lindau line have been upgraded for the operation of tilt trains, allowing operations at up to 160 km/h. The tilting technology operation was integrated into the timetable at the timetable change on 11 December 2011. The journey time from Augsburg to Lindau was reduced by 25 minutes (from 2:32 to 2:07).

Beginning at the timetable change in December 2014, a total of seven trains were operated with new TRAXX (class 245) diesel locomotives and double-decker cars on the Munich–Füssen route and during peak hours on the Munich–Kempten route, replacing trains composed of class 218 locomotives and single-decker Silberling cars.

The Oberstaufen Tunnel, which previously could only be operated at 30 km/h, was renovated in 2016 and extended to 160 metres. The line between Immenstadt and Oberstaufen was closed from 3 April to 6 December 2016. As part of the construction work, the Oberstaufen station was rebuilt with sets of points, restoring its status as a Bahnhof (full station).

In February 2008, Germany and Switzerland signed a letter of intent committing to upgrading the Munich–Lindau line and electrifying the previously non-electrified section between Geltendorf and Lindau. It was eventually decided to electrify and upgrade the alternative route via Memmingen. On the Buchloe–Lindau line, only the 23 kilometre-long Hergatz–Lindau-Aeschach junction section was electrified. Deutsche Bahn commenced electrical operations on this section in December 2020. As a result, the international connections via Kempten were discontinued at the timetable change on 13 December 2020. During the construction phase, however, from December 2019, long-distance trains were routed over the Buchloe–Lindau line with a stop in Kempten. Electrification of the remaining Lindau-Aeschach junction–Lindau-Insel section was completed by December 2021.

== Operations ==
=== Long-distance services ===
A Trans-Europ-Express (first class only) service was introduced in the 1969/70 winter timetable, running on the Munich–Lindau–Bregenz–St. Margrethen–St. Gallen–Winterthur–Zurich (lines 56 and 57), called the Bavaria. On the evening of 9 February 1971 a TEE 56 service derailed on the Munich–Zurich route at Aitrang due to speeding, killing 28 people and seriously injuring 42. In 1977, the TEE service was replaced by a "D" (two-class express) service between Zurich and Munich (lines 276 and 277).

EuroCity trains have operated on the line since the introduction of the train type in 1987, initially also called the Bavaria. Four pairs of EuroCity trains ran daily between Munich and Zurich, but it has not been given a name since 2002. From the beginning of the 1990s, most EuroCity trains between Munich and Zurich ran via Memmingen to Lindau, with only a single EuroCity train pair running via Kempten (trains 196 and 197).

There is also a daily Intercity train pair between Hamburg and Oberstdorf that uses the Buchloe–Immenstadt section of the Buchloe–Lindau line. Another InterCity train runs between Magdeburg and Oberstdorf, using the Buchloe–Lindau line only between Kempten and Immenstadt.

The German EuroCity trains on the line were replaced by ICE TD (class 605) diesel multiple units in 2001/2002 on the Munich–Lindau–St. Gallen–Zurich route. These trains from the start, however, had significant defects that were resolved only gradually. The authorisation for the class to run on the line was cancelled from 24 July 2003 and EuroCity trains were reintroduced.

Operation of Eurocity services with ETR 610 electric multiple units on this line ended at the timetable change on 13 December 2020. Eurocity services have since been operated with EuroCity-Express (ECE) sets, but only over the upgraded line via Memmingen and therefore only use the Buchloe–Lindau line on the electrified section between Hergatz and Lindau-Aeschach.

In long-distance traffic, the Nebelhorn Intercity train pair from Hamburg to Oberstdorf uses the Buchloe–Immenstadt section of the line. The Allgäu Intercity from Oberstdorf to Dortmund runs on the line between Immenstadt and Kempten.

=== Regional services ===
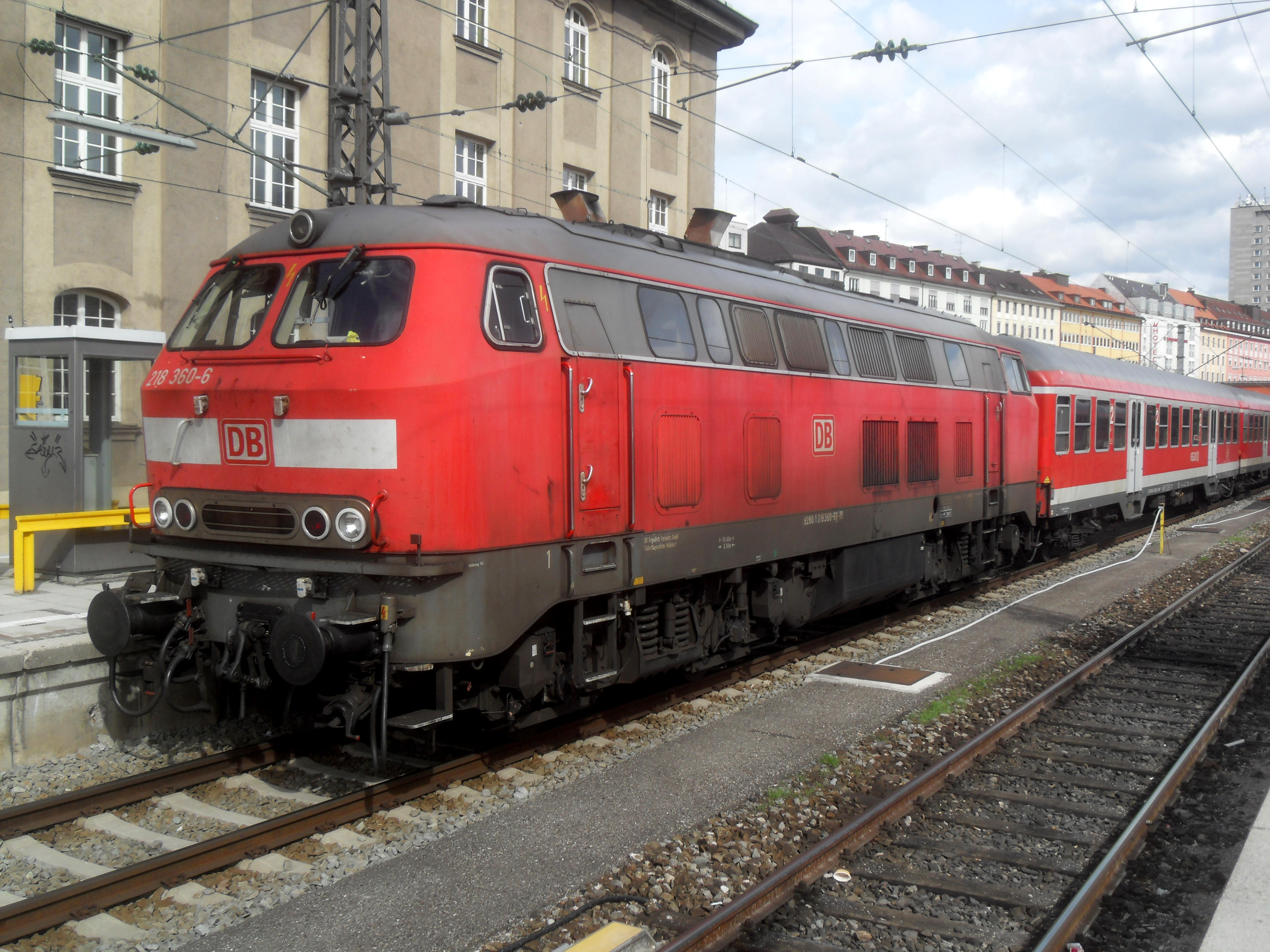
Regional Express hauled by DB Class 218 diesel locomotive in Munich on the way to Kaufbeuren on the Buchloe–Lindau railway

All remaining stations on the Allgäu line have at least hourly services, except Günzach, where trains run every two hours. The DB Regional Express service from Munich to Lindau-Reutin (RE 70) runs every two hours. This is coupled with the RE 76 to Immenstadt, which continues to Oberstdorf. The two-hourly RE 7 service from Augsburg to Lindau-Reutin, which is coupled between Augsburg and Immenstadt with the RE 17 service between Augsburg and Oberstdorf, also runs on the whole line. Together these two services provide an hourly service.

There are also regional services of Bayerische Regiobahn (BRB) on the Buchloe–Biessenhofen section operating between Munich and Füssen (RB 68; three train pairs a day) and between Augsburg and Füssen (RB 77; approximately hourly).

=== Freight traffic ===
The line is currently not a significant route for international freight. It serves as an important detour route around the Austrian Arlberg railway during disruptions.

On the line are still some companies that are served several times a week by rail.

== Sources ==
=== References ===
- Handbuch der deutschen Eisenbahnstrecken (Handbook of German railways) (in German). Dumjahn. 1984. ISBN 3-921426-29-4.
- Bufe, Siegfried (1991). Allgäubahn, München - Kempten - Lindau (Allgäu Railway) (in German). Egglham. ISBN 3-922138-41-1.
- "Kursbuchstrecke 970" (PDF) (in German). Die Allgäubahn.
