= Augsburg-Hochzoll station =

Railway halt in Augsburg, Germany

Augsburg Hochzoll
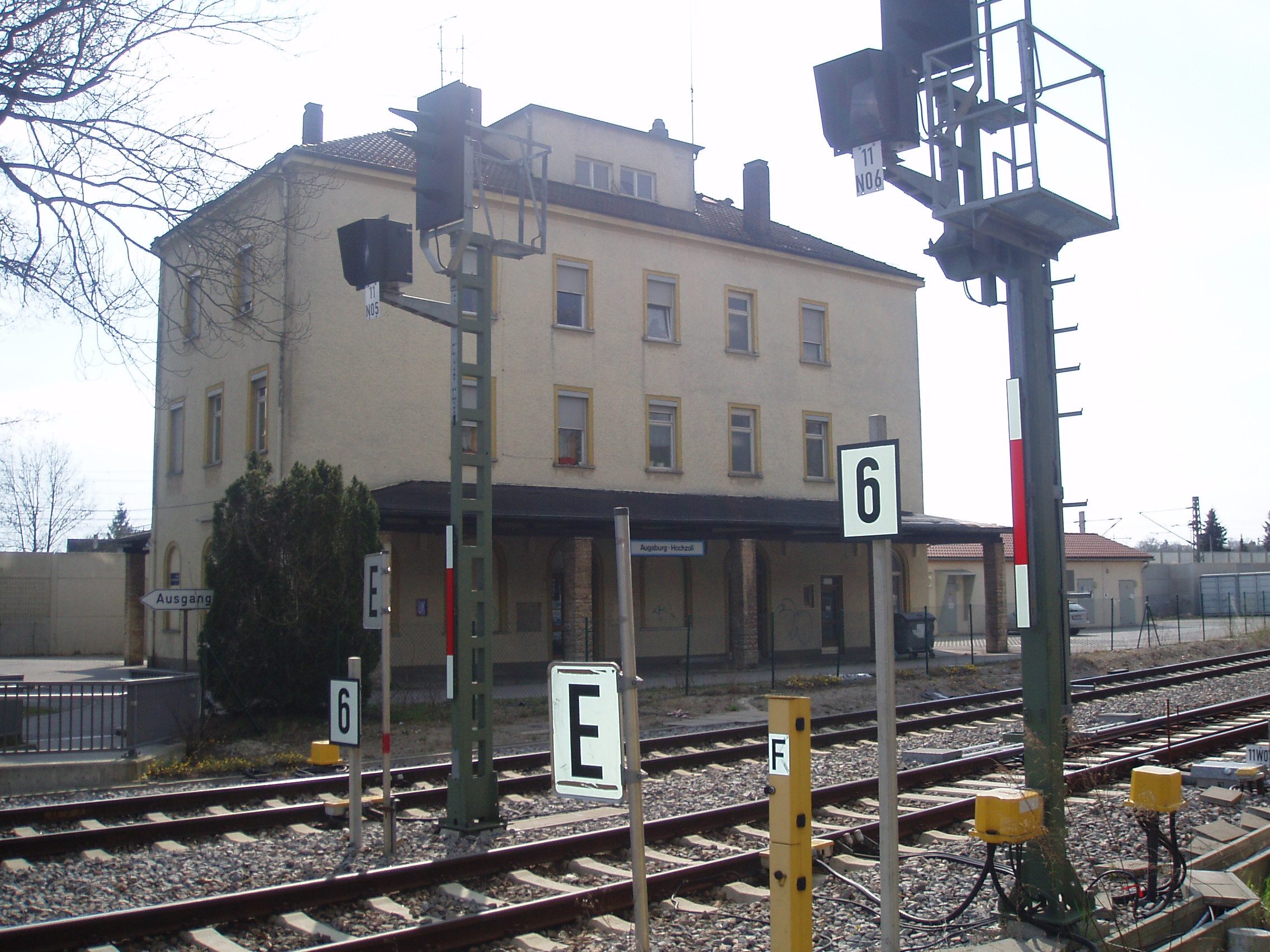
- Entrance building

General information
- Location: Augsburg, Bavaria; Germany
- Coordinates: 48°21′11″N 10°56′39″E
- Owner: Deutsche Bahn
- Operator: DB Netz; DB Station&Service
- Lines: Augsburg–Munich (KBS 980); Ingolstadt–Augsburg (KBS 983)
- Platforms: 4

Construction
- Accessible: Yes

Other information
- Station code: 223
- DS100 code: MAHZ
- Category: 3
- Fare zone: : 20
- Website: www.bahnhof.de; stationsdatenbank.de

Passengers
- < 5,000 (2006)

Services
Preceding station		Following station
Augsburg Haunstetterstraße towards Ulm Hbf	RE 9	Kissing towards München Hbf
Augsburg Haunstetterstraße towards Würzburg Hbf	RE 80	Kissing towards München Hbf
Augsburg Haunstetterstraße towards Aalen Hbf	RE 89	Kissing towards München Hbf
Augsburg Haunstetterstraße towards Dinkelscherben	RB 86	Kissing towards München Hbf
Augsburg Haunstetterstraße towards Donauwörth	RB 87	Kissing towards München Hbf
Preceding station		Following station
Augsburg Haunstetterstraße towards Augsburg Hbf	RB 13	Friedberg (b Augsburg) towards Ingolstadt Hbf
Augsburg Haunstetterstraße towards Augsburg-Oberhausen	RB 67	Kissing towards Schongau
Location

Augsburg-Hochzoll station is a keilbahnhof in the Hochzoll district east of central Augsburg in the German state of Bavaria. Directly west of the station, the Paar Valley Railway separates from the Munich–Augsburg railway running from Augsburg Central Station (Hauptbahnhof). It is classified by Deutsche Bahn as a category 3 station.

== History ==
The station was completely rebuilt during the upgrading of the Munich–Augsburg line as the Munich-Augsburg high speed line and as part of the Magistrale for Europe.

The platforms of the Paar Valley Railway, which had been built at the level of the station building were replaced by two 76 cm high platforms on the bridge over Hochzoller Straße in 2002.

The tracks and the two platforms towards Mering, Munich and Weilheim were replaced from 2000 to 2007 by two through tracks for long-distance traffic and two additional tracks with an island platform for regional traffic. The new island platform for tracks 3 and 4 has been in operation since 16 September 2007. A Bike&Ride facility with about 256 covered bicycle parking places was erected between November 2007 and April 2008.

== Infrastructure ==
Hochzoll station takes an unusual form: since it is located immediately after the tracks towards Munich or Ingolstadt separate, the platforms on the two lines are somewhat separated: platform tracks 5 and 6 are located on the Paar Valley line with the platforms on the outside of the tracks, while platform tracks 3 and 4 in contrast are on a central platform on the Munich–Augsburg line. There is no platform on tracks 1 and 2 of the Munich–Augsburg line. These tracks are now only used for non-stopping passenger services and freight traffic.

The station building, which lies between track 4 and 5, used to have a ticket office that was open on weekdays and ticket machines. The ticket office is now closed, and the ticket machines have been relocated on the newly built platforms.

Bahnhof Augsburg-Hochzoll bus stop is located on Hochzoller Straße, which runs under the two sets of tracks east of the station building. It is served by city bus route 29 and has a kiosk, where tickets for regional transport can be obtained. The kiosk is accommodated temporarily in a container. It has not been determined whether the operator will receive a new building or even be installed in the station building, which is not used for rail purposes.

== Services ==
The station is served by all Regionalbahn and Regional-Express services that leave Augsburg Hauptbahnhof to the east and then run via Aichach to Ingolstadt or via Mering to Munich. The odd layout of the station means that there is some distance between some platforms. Long-distance traffic does not stop at Augsburg-Hochzoll. In recent years there has been an increase in its importance due to the S-Bahn-like schedule of the Augsburg region clock-face timetable. The station has received a growing importance for commuters to central Augsburg mainly as a result of its numerous services: Bayerische Regiobahn services operate to and from Friedberg or Aichach (continuing to Ingolstadt once an hour) every 15 minutes all day. To and from Mering, Bayerische Regiobahn services also alternate with DB Regio services, providing a service every 15 minutes in the peak hour, so that at these times there are services every 7.5-minutes into and out of the city.

Augsburg-Hochzoll is located in the fare zone of the Augsburger Verkehrsverbund (Augsburg Transport Association, AVV).

Route number	Route		Frequency (minutes)
RE 9	Munich – Augsburg-Hochzoll – Augsburg Hbf – Neusäß – Gessertshausen – Dinkelscherben – Günzburg – Ulm		60
RE 80; RB 89	Munich – Augsburg-Hochzoll – Augsburg Hbf – Dinkelscherben – Donauwörth	Treuchtlingen – Ansbach – Würzburg	60
RE 80; RB 89	Munich – Augsburg-Hochzoll – Augsburg Hbf – Dinkelscherben – Donauwörth	Nördlingen – Aalen	60
RB 86; RB 87	Munich – Mering – Augsburg-Hochzoll – Augsburg Hbf –	Neusäß – Gessertshausen – Dinkelscherben	60
RB 86; RB 87	Munich – Mering – Augsburg-Hochzoll – Augsburg Hbf –	Gersthofen – Meitingen – Mertingen – Donauwörth	60
RB 67	Augsburg-Oberhausen – Augsburg Hbf – Augsburg-Hochzoll – Geltendorf – Weilheim (– Schongau)		60 in peak
RB 67	Augsburg-Oberhausen – Augsburg Hbf – Augsburg-Hochzoll (– Geltendorf)		60
RB 13	Augsburg Hbf – Augsburg-Hochzoll – Friedberg – Aichach – Ingolstadt Hbf		15 (Augsburg–Friedberg); 30 (Friedberg–Aichach); 60 (Aichach–Ingolstadt)

Between tracks 1 and 5 there is a bus stop used by city buses on route 29, which runs only on weekdays (in the peak hour every 10 minutes). About 250 metres north of the station along Hochzoller Straße there is a bus and tram stop called Hochzoll Mitte on Friedberger Straße, which is served by city bus line 29 and tram line 6.
