= Augsburg Haunstetterstraße station =

Railway station in Augsburg, Germany

Augsburg Haunstetterstraße
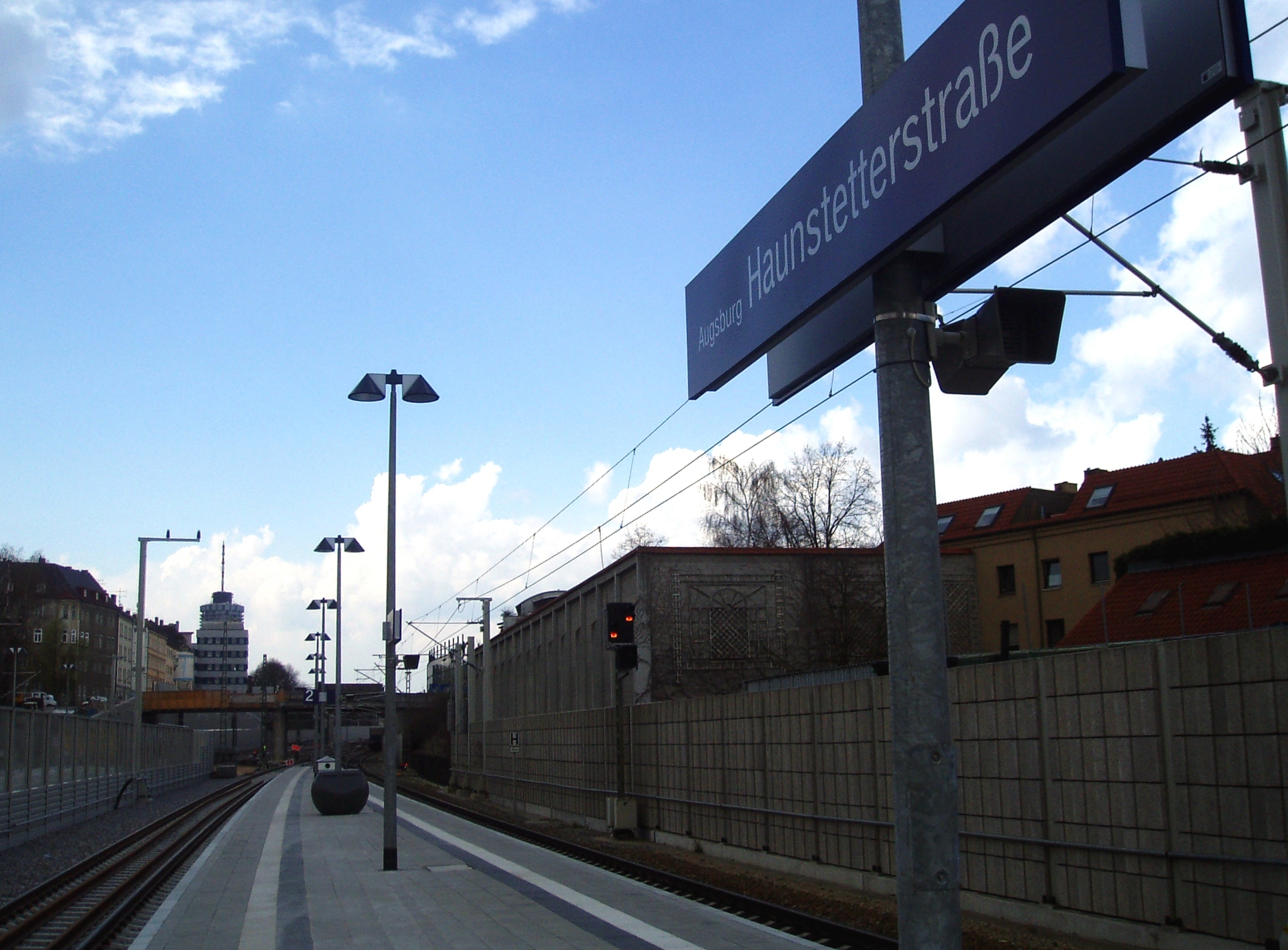
- View of the platform (before it was completed)

General information
- Location: Haunstetter Str. 1, Augsburg, Bavaria; Germany
- Coordinates: 48°21′19″N 10°54′04″E
- Owner: Deutsche Bahn
- Operator: DB Netz; DB Station&Service
- Lines: Augsburg–Munich (KBS 980); Ingolstadt–Augsburg (KBS 983)
- Platforms: 4

Construction
- Accessible: Yes

Other information
- Station code: 219
- DS100 code: MAHA
- IBNR: 8000658
- Category: 3
- Fare zone: : 10
- Website: www.bahnhof.de; stationsdatenbank.de

History
- Opened: 1939

Passengers
- < 1000 (2006)

Services
Preceding station		Following station
Augsburg Hbf towards Ulm Hbf	RE 9	Augsburg-Hochzoll towards München Hbf
Augsburg Hbf towards Würzburg Hbf	RE 80	Augsburg-Hochzoll towards München Hbf
Augsburg Hbf towards Aalen Hbf	RE 89	Augsburg-Hochzoll towards München Hbf
Augsburg Hbf towards Dinkelscherben	RB 86	Augsburg-Hochzoll towards München Hbf
Augsburg Hbf towards Donauwörth	RB 87	Augsburg-Hochzoll towards München Hbf
Augsburg Hbf towards Aalen Hbf	RB 89	Augsburg-Hochzoll towards München Hbf
Preceding station		Following station
Augsburg Hbf Terminus	RB 13	Augsburg-Hochzoll towards Ingolstadt Hbf
Augsburg Hbf towards Augsburg-Oberhausen	RB 67	Augsburg-Hochzoll towards Schongau
Preceding station	Augsburg tram	Following station
Rotes Tor towards Augsburg West P+R	2	Schertlinstraße towards Haunstetten Nord
Rotes Tor towards Augsburg Hbf	3	Schertlinstraße towards Königsbrunn Zentrum or WWK-Arena
Location
- Location within Bavaria Location within Germany Location within Europe

Augsburg Haunstetterstraße station is a station south of central Augsburg in the German state of Bavaria. It lies on a railway bridge over Haunstetter Straße, formerly written "Haunstetterstraße", and extends west to the Hochfeld bridge, which has been directly accessible via a staircase from the platform since December 2009. It is classified by Deutsche Bahn as a category 3 station. The station has been considerably remodelled in recent years as part of the upgrading of the Munich–Augsburg railway to have four tracks and is now mainly used to transfer between regional trains and tram lines 2, 3 and special event tram lines 8 and 9.

== Regional services ==
Augsburg Haunstetterstraße station is served by almost all Regionalbahn and Regional-Express services operated from Augsburg Central Station (Hauptbahnhof) towards Augsburg-Hochzoll and then Aichach to Ingolstadt or to Mering and Munich. All services of the Bayerische Regiobahn (BRB) towards Geltendorf or Weilheim also stop here. Trains to Friedberg, Aichach and Ingolstadt, which have also been served by the BRB since the timetable change of 13 December 2009, stop at the station at 15, 30 or 60 minute intervals depending on the destination. Taking all services together, the Augsburg "trunk line" between Augsburg-Hochzoll, Augsburg Haunstetterstraße, Augsburg Central Station and Augsburg-Oberhausen is served at 7.5-minute intervals during the peak, providing a regional train service close in quality to the proposed Augsburg S-Bahn service.

The station is not served by long distance services (Intercity-Express and Intercity trains). On 1 January 2009, Haunstetterstraße station was classified as a category 4 station. It was reclassified on 1 January 2011 as a category 3 station. Since then the station has been served regularly and it has developed as a major inner-city interchange station along with the Central Station and Hochzoll and Oberhausen stations. This eliminated difficult detours through the city centre to the Central Station for commuters from the southern districts of Augsburg.

Route number	Route		Frequency (minutes)
RE 9	Munich – Augsburg Haunstetterstraße – Augsburg Hbf – Neusäß – Gessertshausen – Dinkelscherben – Günzburg – Ulm		60
RE 80; RE 89	Munich – Augsburg Haunstetterstraße – Augsburg Hbf – Dinkelscherben – Donauwörth	Treuchtlingen – Ansbach – Würzburg	60
RE 80; RE 89	Munich – Augsburg Haunstetterstraße – Augsburg Hbf – Dinkelscherben – Donauwörth	Nördlingen – Aalen	60
RB 86; RB 87	Munich – Mering – Augsburg Haunstetterstraße – Augsburg Hbf –	Neusäß – Gessertshausen – Dinkelscherben	60
RB 86; RB 87	Munich – Mering – Augsburg Haunstetterstraße – Augsburg Hbf –	Gersthofen – Meitingen – Mertingen – Donauwörth	60
RB 67	Augsburg-Oberhausen – Augsburg Hbf – Augsburg Haunstetterstraße – Geltendorf – Weilheim (– Schongau)		60 in peak
RB 67	Augsburg-Oberhausen – Augsburg Hbf – Augsburg Haunstetterstraße (– Geltendorf)		60
RB 13	Augsburg Hbf – Augsburg Haunstetterstraße – Friedberg – Aichach – Ingolstadt Hbf		15 (Augsburg–Friedberg); 30 (Friedberg–Aichach); 60 (Aichach–Ingolstadt)
RB 89	München – Augsburg Haunstetterstraße – Augsburg – Donauwörth – Harburg – Nördlingen – Bopfingen – Westhausen – Aalen		Some trains

== Local services ==
Under the railway bridge there is a tram stop called Haunstetter Str./FH for regular tram lines 2 and 3 and special event tram lines 8 (to SGL arena) and 9 (Messe Augsburg, the Augsburg exhibition centre). It gives passengers short transfer distances and it is protected from the weather. Since its revamp in 2008 there are also lifts from the tram stop to both platforms. In addition, a staircase was built from the southern platform to Hochfeldstraße.

Line	Route	Interval
	P+R Augsburg-West – Königsplatz - Haunstetter Str./FH - Haunstetten Nord	5 Min.*
	Stadtbergen - Pfersee - Augsburg Hauptbahnhof - Königsplatz - Haunstetter Str./FH - University - Haunstetten West P+R	5 Min.*
	Augsburg Hauptbahnhof - Königsplatz – Haunstetter Str./FH - Augsburg Fußball Arena	special service with football logo
	Augsburg Hauptbahnhof – Königsplatz - Haunstetter Str./FH - Augsburg-Messezentrum (exhibition center)	special service
94	Friedberg - Hochzoll - Königsplatz - Haunstetter Str./FH – Augsburg-Haunstetten Süd	60 Min. (weekends only)
92	Neusäß - Oberhausen - Königsplatz - Haunstetter Str./FH - Augsburg-Haunstetten Johann-Strauß-Straße	60 Min. (weekends only)
* 5 minute interval Monday to Friday 7:00 - 8:00 and 12:00 - 18:00. Operates daily 5:00 - midnight.
