= Kissing station =

Railway station in Germany

Kissing
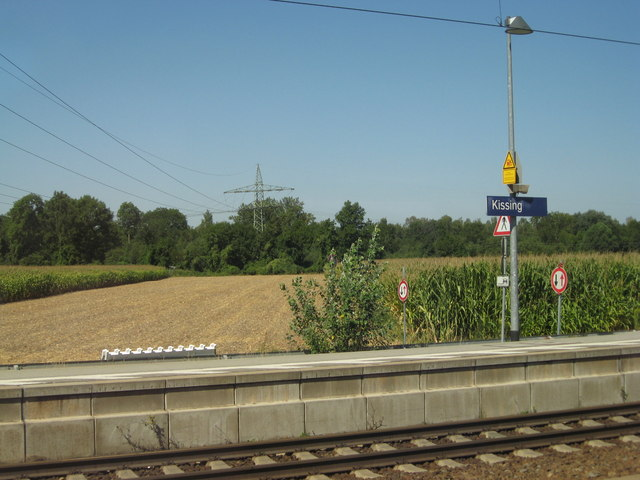
- 2012

General information
- Location: Bahnhofsallee 10; 86438 Kissing; Bavaria; Germany
- Coordinates: 48°18′03″N 10°57′33″E
- System: Bf
- Owner: Deutsche Bahn
- Operator: DB Netz; DB Station&Service
- Lines: Munich–Augsburg railway (KBS 980)
- Platforms: 1 island platform 1 side platform
- Tracks: 5
- Train operators: Bayerische Regiobahn; DB Regio Bayern
- Connections: RE; RB 67 RB 86

Construction
- Parking: Yes
- Cycle facilities: Yes
- Accessible: Yes

Other information
- Station code: 3210
- DS100 code: MKIS
- IBNR: 8003299
- Category: 4
- Fare zone: : 30
- Website: www.bahnhof.de

Services
Preceding station		Following station
Augsburg-Hochzoll towards Ulm Hbf	RE 9	Mering-St Afra towards München Hbf
Augsburg-Hochzoll towards Würzburg Hbf	RE 80	Mering-St Afra towards München Hbf
Augsburg-Hochzoll towards Aalen Hbf	RE 89	Mering-St Afra towards München Hbf
Augsburg-Hochzoll towards Dinkelscherben	RB 86	Mering-St Afra towards München Hbf
Augsburg-Hochzoll towards Donauwörth	RB 87	Mering-St Afra towards München Hbf
Preceding station		Following station
Augsburg-Hochzoll towards Augsburg-Oberhausen	RB 67	Mering-St Afra towards Schongau
Location
- Location within Bavaria Location within Germany Location within Europe

Kissing station (German: Bahnhof Kissing) is a railway station in the municipality of Kissing, located in the Aichach-Friedberg district in Bavaria, Germany.
