= Waldhausen (b Schorndorf) station =

Railway station in the municipality of Plüderhausen

Waldhausen (b Schorndorf)

General information
- Location: Lorcher Straße 11; 73547 Lorch-Waldhausen; Baden-Württemberg; Germany
- Coordinates: 48°47′21″N 09°38′17″E
- Elevation: 274 m (899 ft)
- System: Hp
- Owner: DB Netz
- Operator: DB Station&Service
- Lines: Stuttgart-Bad Cannstatt–Nördlingen railway (KBS 786)
- Platforms: 2 side platforms
- Tracks: 2
- Train operators: Go-Ahead Baden-Württemberg
- Connections: Bus interchange

Construction
- Parking: yes
- Cycle facilities: yes

Other information
- Station code: 6485
- DS100 code: TWY
- IBNR: 8006157
- Category: 5
- Fare zone: : 5 OAM: 2118
- Website: www.bahnhof.de

Services
Preceding station		Following station
Plüderhausen towards Stuttgart Hbf	MEX 13	Lorch (Württ) towards Crailsheim
Location
- Location within Baden-Württemberg Location within Germany Location within Europe

Waldhausen (b Schorndorf) station is a railway stop in the municipality of Lorch, located in the Ostalbkreis district in Baden-Württemberg, Germany. The station lies on the Stuttgart-Bad Cannstatt–Nördlingen railway. The train services are operated by Go-Ahead Baden-Württemberg.
