= Plüderhausen station =

Railway station in the municipality of Plüderhausen

Plüderhausen

General information
- Location: Bahnhofstraße 1; 73655 Plüderhausen; Baden-Württemberg; Germany
- Coordinates: 48°47′48″N 09°35′46″E
- Elevation: 262 m (860 ft)
- System: Bf
- Owner: DB Netz
- Operator: DB Station&Service
- Lines: Stuttgart-Bad Cannstatt–Nördlingen (KBS 786)
- Platforms: 1 side platform 1 island platform
- Tracks: 3
- Train operators: Go-Ahead Baden-Württemberg
- Connections: Bus interchange

Construction
- Parking: yes
- Cycle facilities: yes

Other information
- Station code: 4969
- DS100 code: TPL
- IBNR: 8004842
- Category: 4
- Fare zone: : 5
- Website: www.bahnhof.de

Services
Preceding station		Following station
Urbach (b Schorndorf) towards Stuttgart Hbf	MEX 13	Waldhausen (b Schorndorf) towards Crailsheim
Location
- Location within Baden-Württemberg Location within Germany Location within Europe

Plüderhausen station is a railway station in the municipality of Plüderhausen, located in the Rems-Murr-Kreis district in Baden-Württemberg, Germany. The station lies on the Stuttgart-Bad Cannstatt–Nördlingen railway. The train services are operated by Go-Ahead Baden-Württemberg.
