= Urbach (b Schorndorf) station =

Railway station in the municipality of Urbach, Baden-Württemberg

Urbach (b Schorndorf)

General information
- Location: Konrad-Hornschuch-Straße; 73660 Urbach; Baden-Württemberg; Germany
- Coordinates: 48°48′18″N 09°34′28″E
- Elevation: 248 m (814 ft)
- System: Hp
- Owner: DB Netz
- Operator: DB Station&Service
- Lines: Stuttgart–Nördlingen (KBS 786)
- Platforms: 2 side platforms
- Tracks: 2
- Train operators: Go-Ahead Baden-Württemberg
- Connections: Bus interchange

Construction
- Parking: yes
- Cycle facilities: yes
- Accessible: yes

Other information
- Station code: 6371
- DS100 code: TUA
- IBNR: 8006030
- Category: 5
- Fare zone: : 4/5
- Website: www.bahnhof.de

Services
Preceding station		Following station
Schorndorf towards Stuttgart Hbf	MEX 13	Plüderhausen towards Crailsheim
Location
- Location within Baden-Württemberg Location within Germany Location within Europe

Urbach (b Schorndorf) station is a railway stop in the municipality of Urbach, located in the Rems-Murr-Kreis district in Baden-Württemberg, Germany. The station lies on the Stuttgart-Bad Cannstatt–Nördlingen railway. The train services are operated by Go-Ahead Baden-Württemberg.
