= Ber Ulmo =

Rabbi Ber Ulmo (Hebrew: בער בן יונה אלמו, also known as Bernhard Ber Ullmann; 1751 in Pfersee – 21 March 1837 in Pfersee) was, from 1781 until his death, head of the renowned Jewish community of Pfersee (near Augsburg). He also was circumciser, medical practitioner and discount broker in Augsburg.

== Biography ==
From 1770 he studied in Prague, among others at the yeshivah of Yechezkel Landau. His first marriage with Feigele daughter of physician Yona Jeitteles, where he studied medicine in Prague, was childless. His illegitimate daughter Chava Lea was the mother of Ferdinand Wertheimer (1817–1883). With his second wife Sofie (died 1832), daughter of rabbi Moses Löb of Sulzbach he had six children.

On Friday evening before Yom Kippur in 1803 Ber Ulmo was arrested in the synagogue of Pfersee charged with forgery of Austrian bank notes. Along with him in Pfersee, as well as in many other places in Southern Germany over hundred members of Jewish communities were arrested in the same night. Although the charges were false and a pack of lies, the arrested Jews were detained under “Kafakesque” conditions in the iron houses of Günzburg and Donauwörth. Only after 216 days in spring 1804 they were released, some without being interrogated at all. In the time of Ulmo’s custody the famous “Pfersee handwriting” of the Babylonian Talmud (Cod. Hebr. 95), which is regarded as oldest surviving almost complete handwriting of the Talmud and today is in the possession of the Bavarian State Library in Munich, went astray.

Ber Ulmo after his detention wrote a unique handwritten report on his arrest and imprisonment, which about 1861 by his son was translated in Yiddish and in 1928 by his grandson Carl Jonas Ulmann was translated in English. In 2012 a German translation following the handwriting of the Hebrew original was published with many explanatory notes.

Ber Ulmo died on the evening of the Purim festival in 1837 and was buried at the old Jewish cemetery of Pfersee and Kriegshaber, near Augsburg, where many of his ancestors rest.

Among his descendants are the American photographer Doris Ulmann and Richard Willstätter, who in 1915 won the Nobel Prize for Chemistry.
