= Augsburg Hauptbahnhof =

Railway station in Germany

Augsburg Hbf
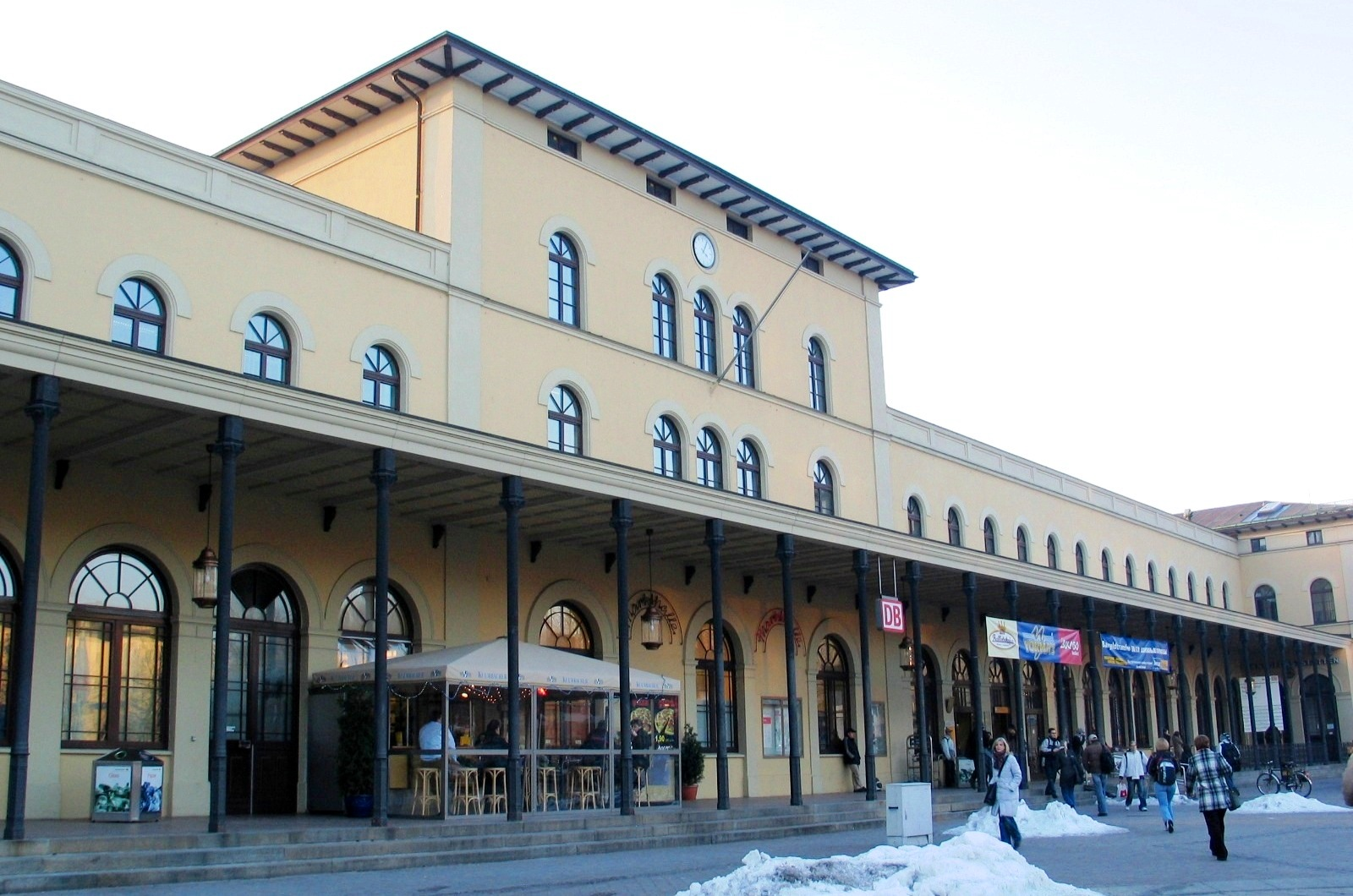
- The front of the station building

General information
- Location: Viktoriastr. 1, Augsburg, Bavaria; Germany
- Coordinates: 48°21′56″N 10°53′11″E
- Owner: Deutsche Bahn
- Operator: DB InfraGO
- Lines: Augsburg–Lindau (KBS 971); Augsburg–Munich (KBS 980); Augsburg–Ulm (KBS 980); Augsburg–Nuremberg (KBS 910); Ingolstadt–Augsburg (KBS 983)
- Platforms: 12

Construction
- Accessible: Yes
- Architect: Eduard Rüber; Friedrich Bürklein (1869 reconstruction)
- Architectural style: Neoclassical

Other information
- Station code: 220
- DS100 code: MA
- IBNR: 8000013
- Category: 2
- Fare zone: : 10
- Website: www.bahnhof.de; stationsdatenbank.de

History
- Opened: 1 July 1846; 180 years ago
- Electrified: 15 May 1931; 95 years ago

Passengers
- 2006: < 50,000 daily
Services
Preceding station	DB Fernverkehr	Following station
Günzburg towards Berlin Gesundbrunnen	ICE 11	Munich Pasing towards München Hbf
Donauwörth towards Berlin Gesundbrunnen or Hamburg-Altona	ICE 18	Munich-Pasing towards München Hbf
Donauwörth towards Hamburg-Altona	ICE 24	Munich-Pasing towards Schwarzach-St.Veit
Ulm Hbf towards Hamburg-Altona	ICE 42	Munich-Pasing towards München Hbf
Ulm Hbf towards Karlsruhe Hbf, Basel SBB or Saarbrücken Hbf	ICE 60	Munich-Pasing towards München Hbf
Günzburg towards Frankfurt (Main) Hbf or Münster Hbf	ICE 62	München Hbf towards Graz Hbf
Ulm Hbf towards Amsterdam Centraal	ICE 78	München-Pasing towards München Hbf
Ulm Hbf towards Paris Est	ICE/TGV 83	München Hbf towards München Hbf
Günzburg towards Frankfurt (Main) Hbf	ICE 89	München Hbf towards St. Anton am Arlberg
Günzburg towards München Hbf	ICE/RJX 90	Munich Pasing towards Budapest Keleti
Preceding station	ÖBB	Following station
Nürnberg Hbf towards Amsterdam Centraal or Hamburg-Altona	Nightjet	München Hbf towards Innsbruck Hbf
Preceding station	DB Regio Bayern	Following station
Donauwörth towards Nürnberg Hbf	RE 7	Buchloe towards Lindau-Reutin
Augsburg-Oberhausen towards Nürnberg Hbf	RE 16	Terminus
Donauwörth towards Nürnberg Hbf	RE 17	Buchloe towards Oberstdorf
Terminus	RE 71	Augsburg Morellstraße towards Memmingen
Terminus	RE 71	Buchloe towards Memmingen
Terminus	RE 73	Augsburg Morellstraße towards Bad Wörishofen
Terminus	RE 73	Buchloe towards Bad Wörishofen
Terminus	RE 79	Bobingen towards Kempten (Allgäu) Hbf
Preceding station		Following station
Augsburg-Oberhausen towards Ulm Hbf	RE 9	Augsburg Haunstetterstraße towards München Hbf
Augsburg-Oberhausen towards Würzburg Hbf	RE 80	Augsburg Haunstetterstraße towards München Hbf
Augsburg-Oberhausen towards Donauwörth	RE 87 Limited service	Terminus
Augsburg-Oberhausen towards Aalen Hbf	RE 89	Augsburg Haunstetterstraße towards München Hbf
Augsburg-Oberhausen towards Ansbach	RB 80 Limited service	Terminus
Augsburg-Oberhausen towards Dinkelscherben	RB 86	Augsburg Haunstetterstraße towards München Hbf
Augsburg-Oberhausen towards Donauwörth	RB 87	Augsburg Haunstetterstraße towards München Hbf
Augsburg-Oberhausen towards Aalen Hbf	RB 89	Augsburg Haunstetterstraße towards München Hbf
Preceding station		Following station
Terminus	RB 13	Augsburg Haunstetterstraße towards Ingolstadt Hbf
Augsburg-Oberhausen Terminus	RB 67	Augsburg Haunstetterstraße towards Schongau
Terminus	RB 69	Augsburg Morellstraße towards Landsberg (Lech)
Terminus	RB 77	Augsburg Morellstraße towards Füssen
Augsburg-Oberhausen towards Gessertshausen	RB 83	Terminus
Preceding station	Augsburg tram	Following station
Terminus	3	Königsplatz (Augsburg) towards Königsbrunn Zentrum or WWK-Arena
Terminus	4	Königsplatz (Augsburg) towards Oberhausen Nord P+R
Rosenaustraße towards Stadtbergen	6	Königsplatz (Augsburg) towards Friedberg West P+R
Preceding station	Croatian Railways	Following station
Ulm Hbf towards Stuttgart Hbf	EuroNight	München Hbf towards Zagreb
Location

Augsburg Hauptbahnhof is the main railway station in the Bavarian city of Augsburg, situated in southern Germany. It is classified by Deutsche Bahn as a category 2 station and has 12 platform tracks.

The station has one of the oldest still existing station halls in Germany, which was built from 1843 to 1846 after plans by architect Eduard Rüber. It was reconstructed in 1869 according to Friedrich Bürklein's plans. The station today serves as the central railway hub for the Augsburg metropolitan area and Bavarian Swabia. It is currently being modernised and an underground tram station is being built under it.

== Structure ==
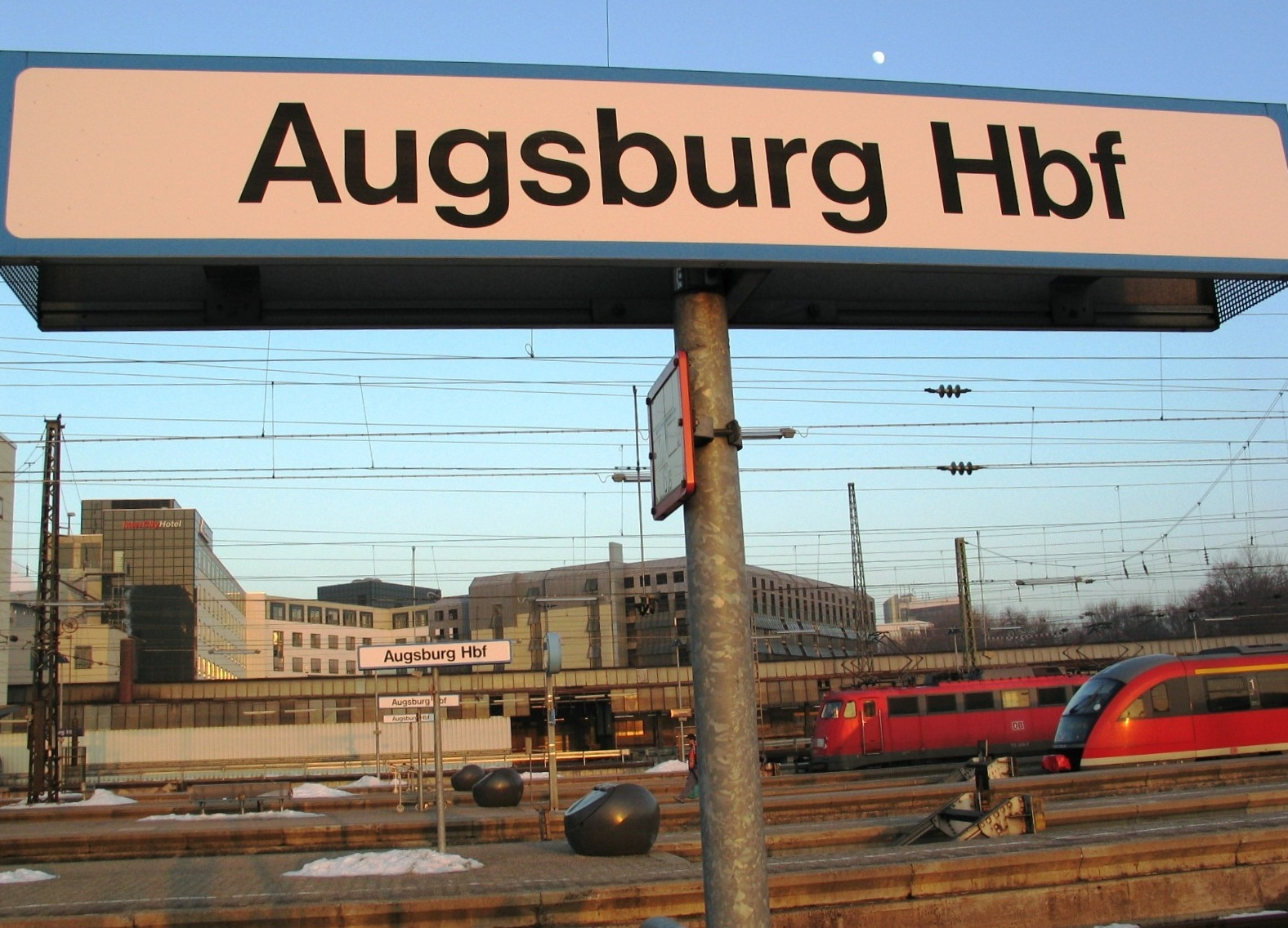
Station sign

The first Augsburg station was opened in 1840 by the Munich-Augsburg Railway Company (München-Augsburger Eisenbahn-Gesellschaft) near the Rotes Tor (Red Gate). Its historic hall served in 1880 as a military riding school and since 1920 it has been part of the main workshop of the traffic branch of Stadtwerke Augsburg (Augsburg's municipal utility). After the nationalisation of the line in 1846, the current station was built. Augsburg Hauptbahnhof is a through station with four central platforms (which each have two faces and are not accessible for the disabled), nine through tracks and six bay platform tracks (only three of which are in use). Platform 1 is located next to the station building and has one side.

=== Station building ===
The station building has three parts. The central block has a station hall with electronic displays, ticket machines, an information booth and waiting facilities. In one wing is the customer centre of Deutsche Bahn, including a ticket office. In the other wing there is a dining and shopping area and the station library.

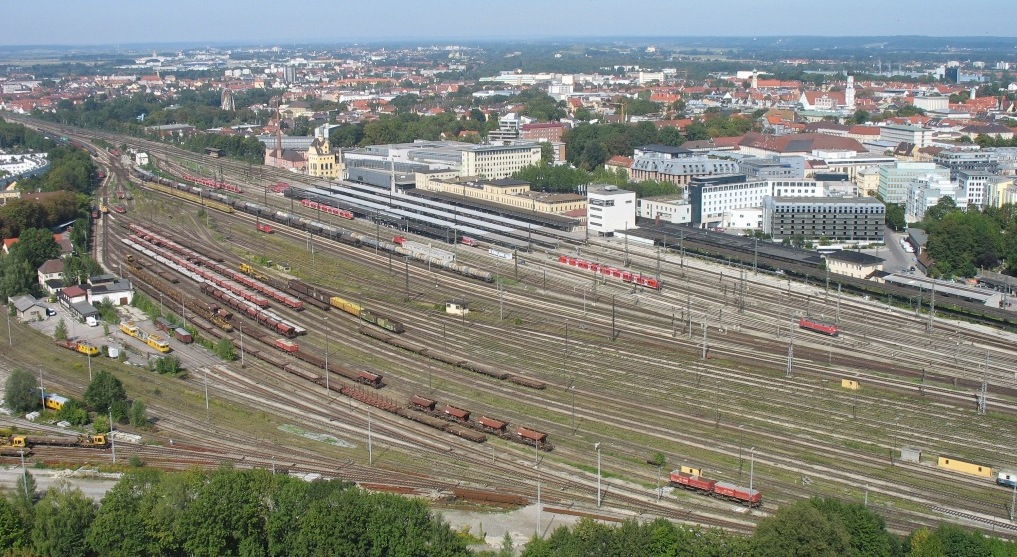
The station from the south

The last major renovation and modernisation of the building was in 1983/84. In recent years, the food court in particular has been upgraded (completed in 2007) and a new digital display board has been installed in the main hall. Recently, the south wing was renovated, including the waiting area for travellers, and the hospitality facilities have continued to grow. Due to the construction of a new tramway station beyond the railway, the station building main wing is closed since 2017. It is filled up with supporting struts to avoid a collapse during the drill through of the tunnels.

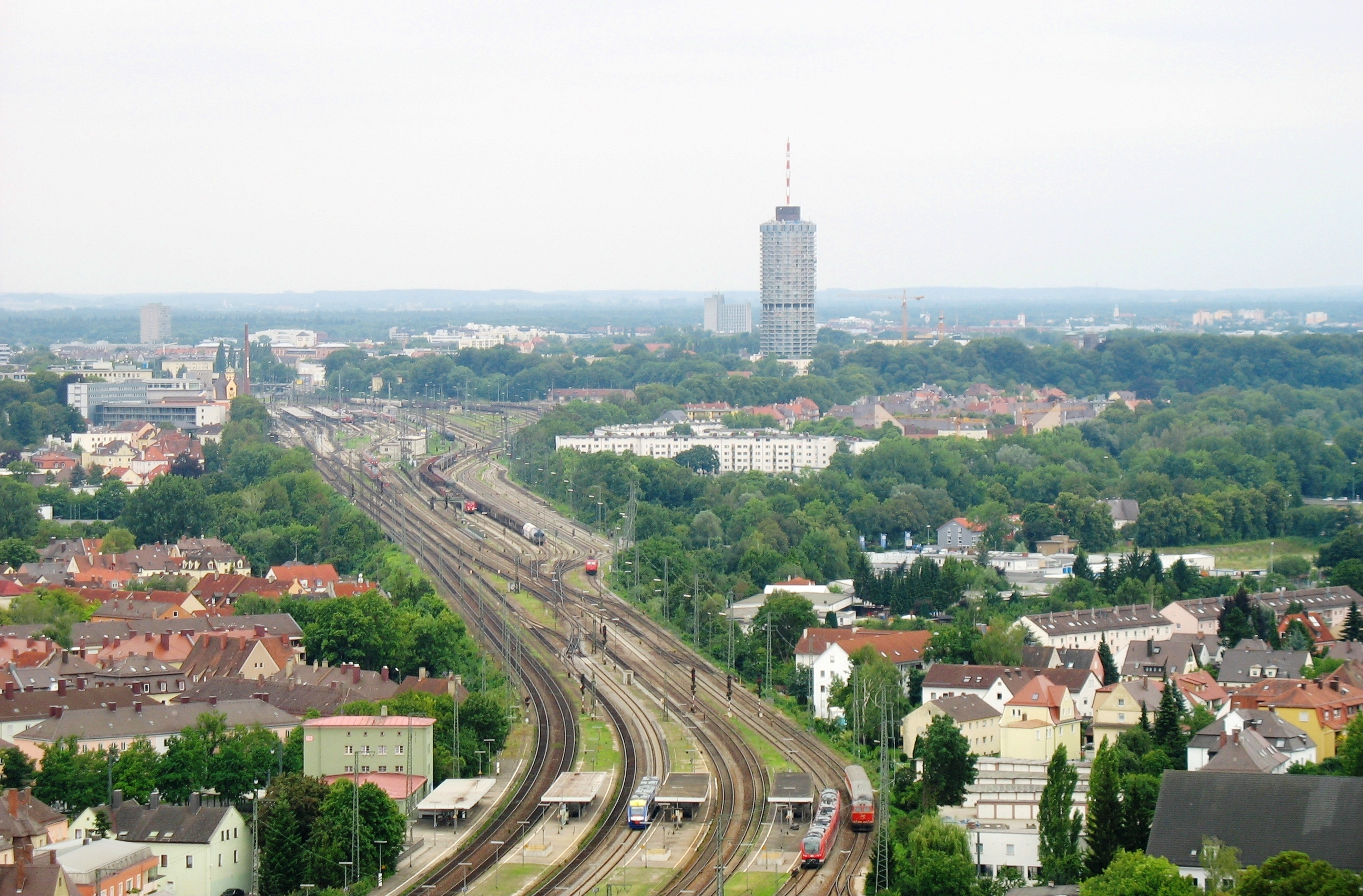
The station from the north - in front: Augsburg-Oberhausen suburban railway station

=== Station environment ===
Directly in front of the building there was a large forecourt with a fountain, a parking lot, including a taxi rank, and a bus station for local buses. Since 2014 the square is used by the construction crew of the tramway tunnels. The fountain is put in storage until redesign of the square. The square is flanked on both sides by shopping centres: on the one hand there is the Helio-Quarter, which shall be opened in 2019, on the other, the Bohus-Center and the InterCityHotel.

West of the passenger station is the freight yard and the former marshalling yard, which is now hardly used. To the south was the former "internal loading area". Also in the southern part of the station building is the original central signalling centre inaugurated in May 1972.

== Operations ==
=== Long-distance services ===
Augsburg station forms the end of one of the busiest long-distance lines in Germany, the Munich–Augsburg high speed line. Work on upgrading the line as a four-track high-speed line was completed in December 2011. Besides Intercity, EuroCity and CityNightLine services, Intercity-Express (ICE) trains run from Munich towards Stuttgart and Nuremberg.

With the opening of the Nuremberg–Ingolstadt–Munich high-speed line in June 2006 and its full integration into the German ICE network at the timetable change in December 2006, some of the ICE services—30 of 120 long-distance services then stopping in Augsburg—were transferred from Augsburg to Ingolstadt.

In 2006, about 10,000 passengers per day were recorded on long-distance services in Augsburg. With 90 long-distance services stopping each day, it is the third most important station in Bavaria in terms of long-distance services.

In the 2026 timetable, the following long-distance services stopped at the station:

Line	Route		Interval
ICE 11	Berlin Gesundbrunnen – Berlin – Leipzig – Erfurt – Fulda – Frankfurt Hbf – Mannheim – Stuttgart – Ulm – Augsburg – Munich		Every 2 hours
ICE 11	Wiesbaden – Mainz – Mannheim – Stuttgart – Augsburg – Munich		1 train from Wiesbaden
ICE 18	Hamburg-Altona – Hamburg – Berlin – Halle – Erfurt – Nuremberg – Augsburg – Munich		Every 2 hours
ICE 24	Hamburg-Altona – Hamburg – Hannover – Göttingen – Kassel-Wilhelmshöhe – Würzburg – Donauwörth – Augsburg – Munich – Rosenheim – Wörgl – Schwarzach-St. Veit		1 train pair
ICE 42	Hamburg-Altona –	Hamburg – Bremen – Münster – Dortmund – (Hagen – Wuppertal) or (– Essen – Düsseldorf) – Cologne – Frankfurt Airport – Mannheim – Stuttgart – Ulm – Augsburg – Munich	Every 2 hours
ICE 42	Kiel – Neumünster –	Hamburg – Bremen – Münster – Dortmund – (Hagen – Wuppertal) or (– Essen – Düsseldorf) – Cologne – Frankfurt Airport – Mannheim – Stuttgart – Ulm – Augsburg – Munich	Every 2 hours
ICE 60	(Basel Bad – Freiburg – Offenburg – Baden-Baden –) Karlsruhe – Bruchsal –	Stuttgart – Ulm – Augsburg – Munich-Pasing – Munich	Every 2 hours
ICE 60	Saarbrücken – Homburg – Kaiserslautern – Neustadt –	Stuttgart – Ulm – Augsburg – Munich-Pasing – Munich	One train pair
ICE 62	Frankfurt – Darmstadt – Heidelberg –	Stuttgart – Ulm – Augsburg – Munich – Rosenheim – Salzburg – Villach – Klagenfurt – Graz	2 train pairs
ICE 62	Münster – Essen – Düsseldorf – Köln Messe/Deutz – Frankfurt Airport – Mannheim –	Stuttgart – Ulm – Augsburg – Munich – Rosenheim – Salzburg – Villach – Klagenfurt – Graz	One train pair
ICE/TGV 83	Munich – Augsburg – Ulm – Stuttgart – Karlsruhe – Strasbourg – Paris Est		1 train pair
ICE/RJX 90	Budapest-Keleti – Vienna – Salzburg – Munich – Augsburg – Ulm – Stuttgart – Mannheim – Frankfurt Flughafen – Frankfurt (– Wiesbaden)		1 train pair

In the summer of 1939 timetable, 87 scheduled long-distance services each day stopped in the station.

From 17 June 2021 until the timetable change in December 2021, the Flixtrain FLX 35N train pair from Munich to Leipzig and back also served Augsburg.

=== Regional services ===
Regional-Express or Regionalbahn services operate from Augsburg to Bad Wörishofen, Donauwörth, Füssen, Hergatz, Ingolstadt, Landsberg, Lindau, Munich, Nuremberg, Oberstdorf, Schongau, Treuchtlingen, Ulm and Weilheim. Especially on the line to Munich there are regularly crowded trains, so double-decker trains, which could carry nearly 1,000 passengers, were used until the timetable change on 13 December 2009. Since then class 440 (Alstom Coradia Continental) EMUs of the so-called Fugger-Express operate S-Bahn-density regional services between Augsburg and Munich. Numerous technical glitches on the new rolling stock delayed the start of the original services for a whole year.

In the 2026 timetable, the following regional services stopped at the station:

Line	Route	Frequency
RE 7 RE 17	(Nuremberg) – Augsburg – Buchloe – Kaufbeuren – Kempten (Allgäu) – Immenstadt (split) – – Lindau-Reutin (RE 7) / – Oberstdorf (RE 17)	every 2 hours, Nuremberg–Augsburg twice a day
RE 9	(Munich – Mering –) Augsburg – Ulm	Ulm–Augsburg hourly Augsburg–Munich every 2 hours
RE 16	Augsburg – Donauwörth – Treuchtlingen – Nuremberg	every 2 hours
RE 71 RE 73	Augsburg – Buchloe – Türkheim (Bay) (split) – – Mindelheim – Memmingen (RE 73) / – Bad Wörishofen (RE 71)	every 2 hours
RE 79	Augsburg – Bobingen – Schwabmünchen – Buchloe – Kaufbeuren – Kempten (Allgäu)	hourly (one train only to Buchloe)
RE 80 RE 89	Munich – Mering – Augsburg – Donauwörth (split) – – Aalen (RE 89) / – Treuchtlingen – Würzburg (RE 80)	every 2 hours
RE 87	Augsburg – Meitingen – Donauwörth	One train Sa+Su towards Donauwörth
RB 13	Augsburg – Friedberg (b Augsburg)	Mon–Fri every 15 minutes, Sat+Sun hourly
RB 13	(...) – Aichach	Mon–Fri half-hourly, Sat+Sun hourly
RB 13	(...) – Schrobenhausen – Ingolstadt	hourly
RB 67	Augsburg-Oberhausen – Augsburg – Mering – Geltendorf – Weilheim (– Schongau)	hourly
RB 67	(Augsburg-Oberhausen –) Augsburg – Mering (– Geltendorf)	hourly in the peak
RB 69	Augsburg – Bobingen – Kaufering – (some trains: – Landsberg (Lech))	hourly, half-hourly in the peak
RB 77	Augsburg – Bobingen	Mon–Fri half-hourly, Sat+Sun hourly
RB 77	(...) – Schwabmünchen – Buchloe – Kaufbeuren – Biessenhofen – Marktoberdorf – Füssen	hourly, extra trains in the peak
RB 80	Augsburg – Donauwörth – Treuchtlingen – Ansbach	One train towards Ansbach Mo-Fr
RB 83	Augsburg – Neusäß – Gessertshausen	30 mins to hourly in the peak
RB 86	Augsburg – Gessertshausen (– Dinkelscherben)	Mon–Fri hourly
RB 87	Augsburg – Meitingen (– Donauwörth)	Mon–Fri hourly
RB 87	Munich – Mering – Augsburg – Donauwörth (- Nördlingen – Aalen)	hourly (Mon–Fri individual trains, Sat+Sun every two hours to Nördlingen/Aalen)
RB 89	(München –) Augsburg – Donauwörth – Harburg – Nördlingen – Bopfingen – Westhausen – Aalen	Some trains

=== Buses and trams ===
Augsburg station serves as one of the central hubs of Augsburg, so many lines of the Augsburger Verkehrsverbunde (Augsburg Transport Association) start and end here. These can be accessed in two places. The Hauptbahnhof stop is in the nearby Halderstraße and is served by the following tram and bus lines:

==== Trams ====
Line	Route	Frequency
	Hauptbahnhof – Königsplatz – Universität – Inninger Straße P+R – Königsbrunn Zentrum	5 min
	Hauptbahnhof – Königsplatz – Wertachbrücke – Oberhausen Nord P+R	7 min
	Stadtbergen – Hauptbahnhof – Königsplatz – Hochschule Augsburg – Schwaben Center – Friedberg West P+R	6 min

==== Buses ====
- Bus route and: towards Firnhaberau
- Bus route: towards Klinikum BKH or Königsplatz and Zoo/ Botanical Garden
- Bus route: towards Diakonissenhaus or Anna-Hintermayr-Stift
- Night bus route: towards Steppach, Bergen, Leitershofen, Königsplatz and Oberhausen
- Night bus route: towards Lechhausen, Hammerschmiede and Firnhaberau or Königsplatz and Hochzoll/Süd

All these lines except line, which is operated by the Storz company, are operated by the Augsburger Verkehrsgesellschaft (Augsburg Transport Company).

On the station forecourt there is a bus station with several bus platforms. A total of 22 regional bus lines, operating in all directions, start or end here.

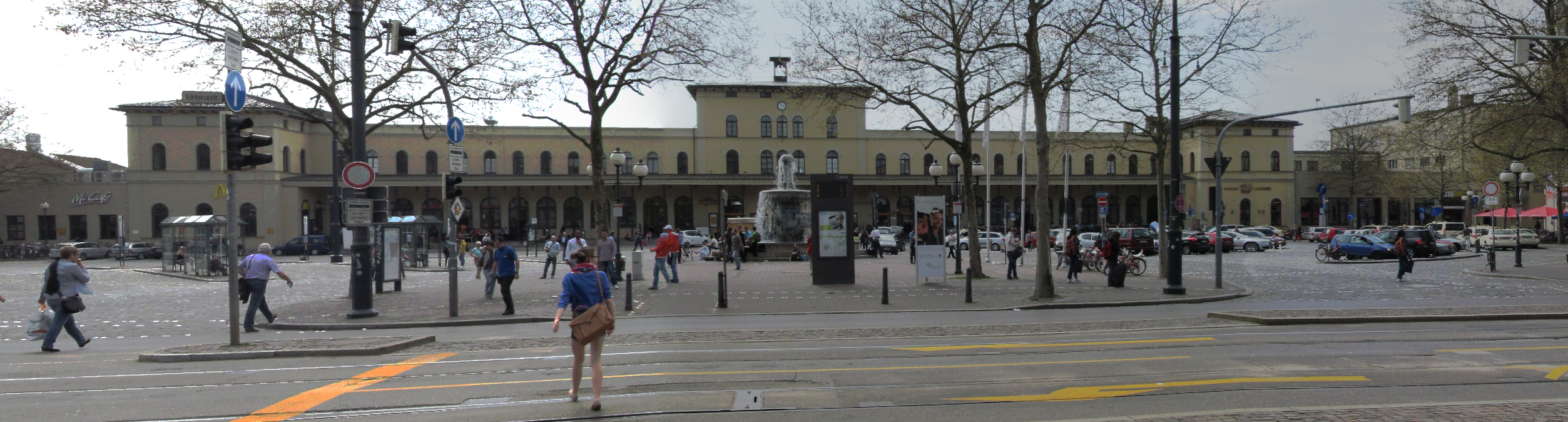
Augsburg Hauptbahnhof

== Incidents ==
On 2 September 2026, the station was shut down for a day after a hand grenade detonated at a jewelry store opposite of the complex at around 3:15. There was minor damage to the storefront and two passersby, both Ukrainian nationals aged 17 and 18, sustained acoustic shock. LKA is investigating ties to organised crime.

== See also ==
- Rail transport in Germany
- Railway stations in Germany
