= Bopfingen station =

Railway station in Baden-Württemberg, Germany

Bopfingen
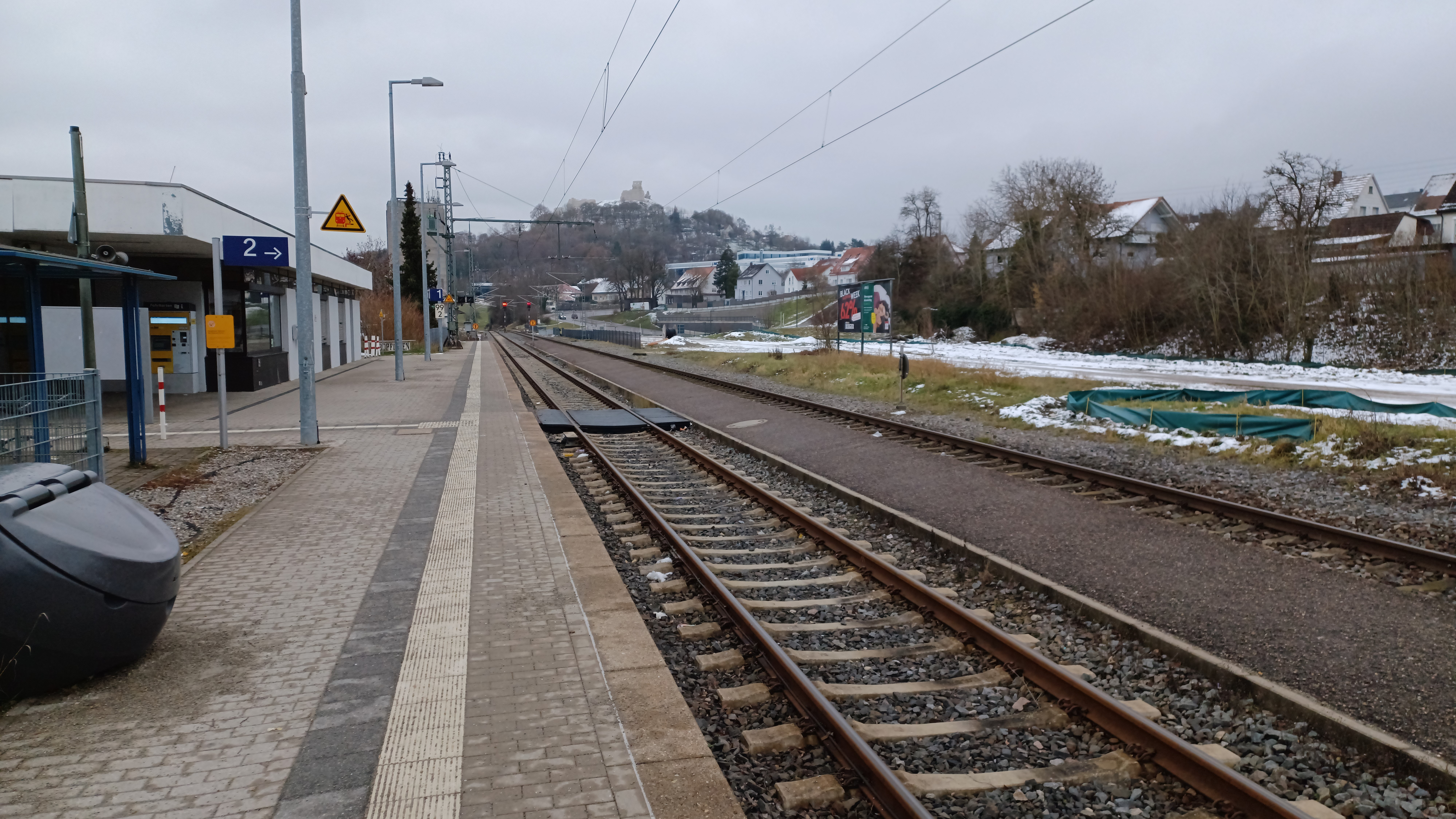

General information
- Location: Bahnhofplatz 1; 73441 Bopfingen; Baden-Württemberg; Germany
- Coordinates: 48°51′19″N 10°21′06″E
- Elevation: 485 m (1,591 ft)
- System: Bf
- Owner: DB Netz
- Operator: DB Station&Service
- Lines: Stuttgart–Nördlingen (KBS 995)
- Platforms: 2 side platforms
- Tracks: 2
- Train operators: Go-Ahead Bayern
- Connections: Bus interchange Parking

Construction
- Parking: yes
- Cycle facilities: yes
- Accessible: yes

Other information
- Station code: 775
- DS100 code: TBP
- IBNR: 8001090
- Category: 6
- Fare zone: OAM: 1490
- Website: www.bahnhof.de

Services
Preceding station		Following station
Aufhausen (Württ) towards Aalen Hbf	RB 89	Trochtelfingen (b Bopfingen) towards Donauwörth
Aufhausen (Württ) towards Aalen Hbf	RE 89	Trochtelfingen (b Bopfingen) towards München Hbf
Location
- Location within Baden-Württemberg Location within Germany Location within Europe

Bopfingen station is a railway station in the town of Bopfingen, located in the Ostalbkreis district in Baden-Württemberg, Germany. The station lies on the Stuttgart-Bad Cannstatt–Nördlingen railway. The train services are operated by Go-Ahead Bayern.
