= Trams in Augsburg =

Tram system in Augsburg, Bavaria, Germany

Coordinates: 48°21′26″N 10°54′23″E

Augsburg tramway network
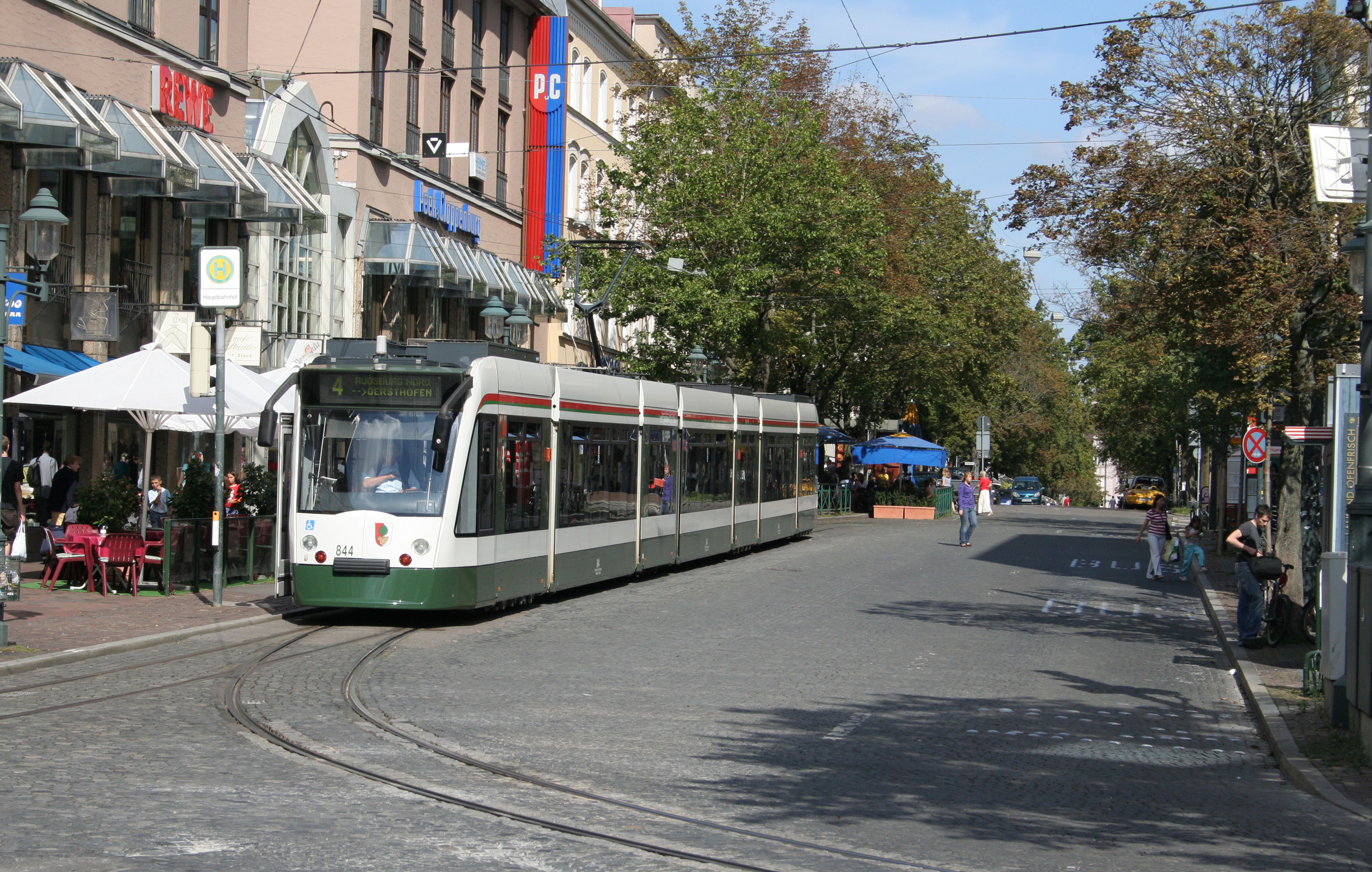
- A Siemens Combino in Augsburg, 2007.

Operation
- Locale: Augsburg, Bavaria, Germany

Statistics
Horsecar era: 1881–1898
- Status: Superseded
- Operator: Augsburger Trambahn
- Track gauge: 1,435 mm (4 ft 8 1/2 in)
- Propulsion system: Horses
Electric tram era: since 1898
- Status: Operational
- Lines: 5 regular + 2 special
- Operator: Stadtwerke Augsburg (SWA)
- Track gauge: 1,000 mm (3 ft 3 3/8 in)
- Propulsion system: Electricity
- Electrification: 750 V DC
- Track length (total): 49.8 km (30.9 mi)
- 2018: 43,201,000
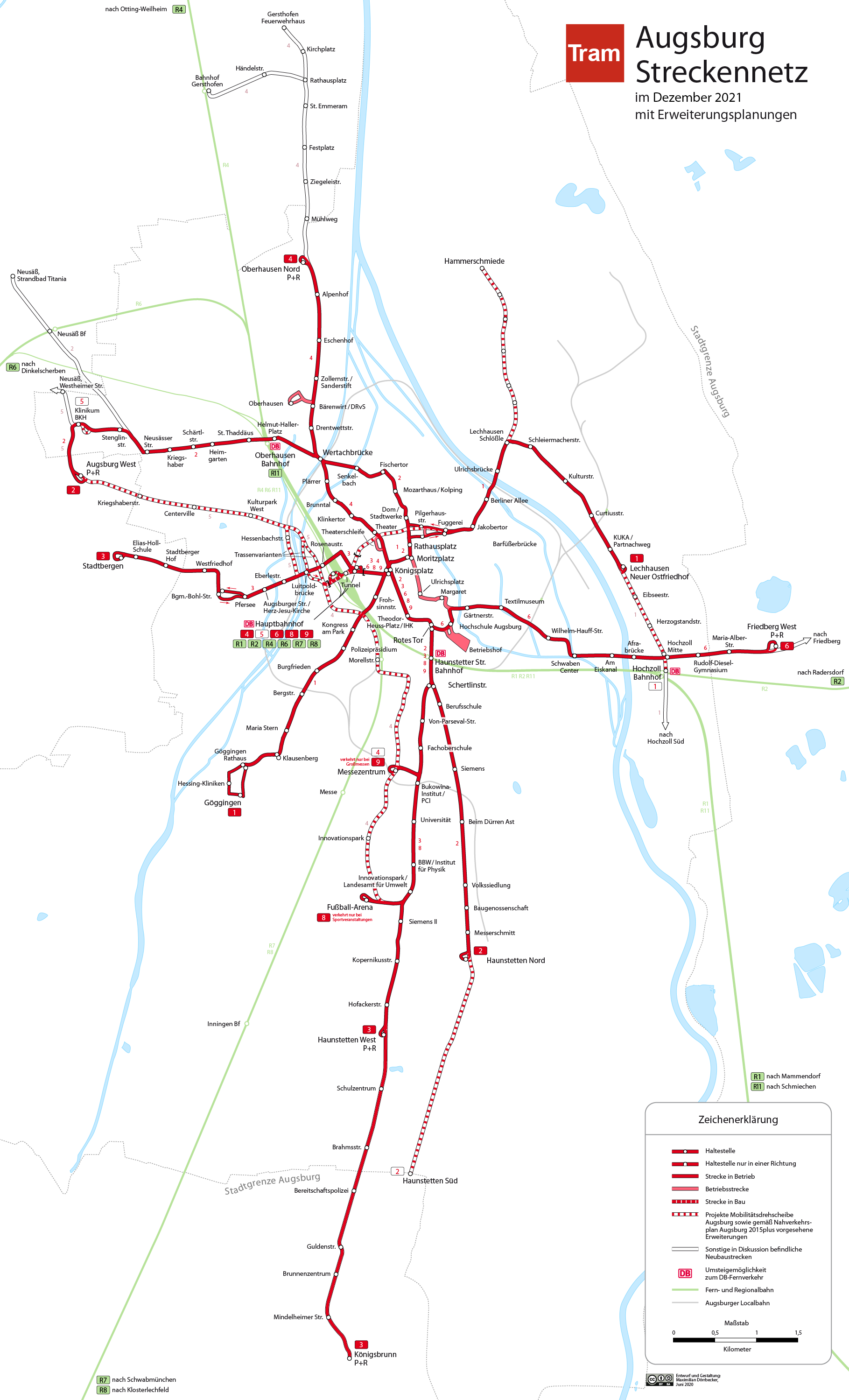
- Map of the network
- Website: https://www.sw-augsburg.de/mobilitaet/swa-bus-tram/ SWA Bus & Tram (in German)

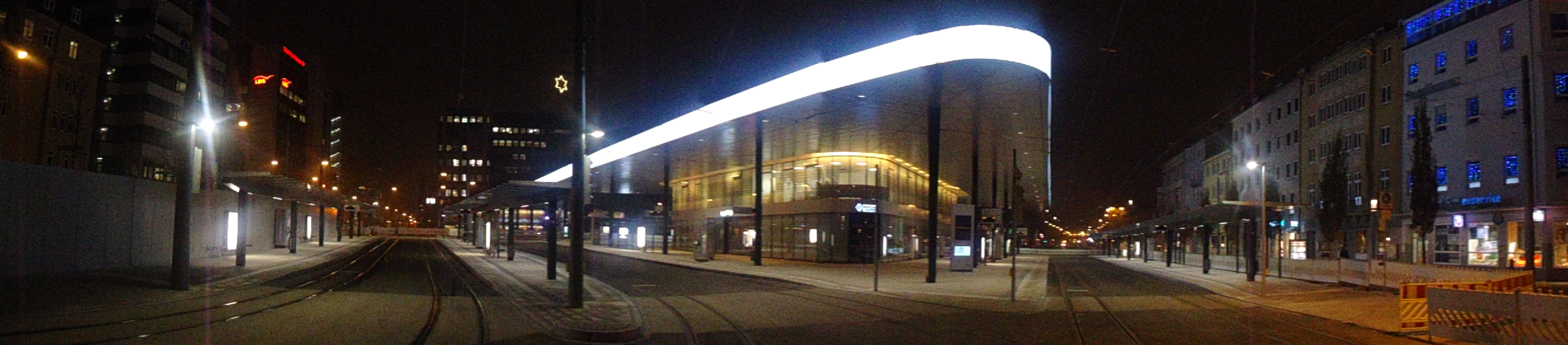
Könisgplatz at night

The tram system in Augsburg is the second largest tram system in Bavaria behind Munich, and followed by Nurnberg. The system is 49.8 km (30.9 mi) long and runs five lines, with two special lines. The city border is crossed in three places. Line 2 and Line 6 cross into Stadtbergen, and line 6 crosses into Friedberg. The system is operated by Stadtwerke Augsburg (SWA), and integrated into the Augsburger Verkehrs- und Tarifverbund (AVV).

== History ==
=== Horse-drawn tramways (1881–1898) ===
The history of the tram system in Augsburg began in 1881 with the opening of horse-drawn tramways running through the city and the neighbouring municipalities of Göggingen, Lechhausen and Pfersee, which were independent municipalities at the time but are now districts of Augsburg. The tramways used standard-gauge tracks (1,435 mm or 4 ft 8½ in) and operated until 1898.

In 1886 and 1887, experiments with steam-powered trams were conducted on the route between Königsplatz and Göggingen. However, the experimental operation was discontinued in June 1887 following protests from local residents.

=== Electrification and expansion (1898–1918) ===
In 1898, electric tram operation began in Augsburg. At the same time, the network was converted to metre gauge (1,000 mm or 3 ft 3⅜ in). The first series of electric tramcars entered service, including car No. 14, which has been preserved.

During the 1900s, several new lines were built and the tram network continued to expand. In 1908, the tramway passed into municipal ownership and operation.

Shortly before and during the First World War, further extensions were built. Some existing routes were also altered as the city centre underwent major changes.

=== Interwar period and Second World War (1918–1945) ===
During the 1920s, several extensions were constructed. In 1920, a new extension of line 6 reached Hochzoll. In 1927, line 4 was extended to Haunstetten.

During the period of Nazi Germany, there were relatively few extensions to the tram network. In 1934, line 6 was extended by several hundred metres to Hochzoll Mitte.

During the Second World War, the tram network suffered extensive damage. Nevertheless, tram services gradually resumed after the war, following permission from the American occupation authorities.

=== Post-war period ===
Shortly after the war, in 1946, line 5 was extended from Barfüßerbrücke to Rotes Tor. In 1947, the tram route from Pfersee to Stadtbergen, a neighbouring municipality west of Augsburg, was extended. This route is now served by line 6.

In 1948, Augsburg received newly built Kriegstraßenbahnwagen (KSWs), which were the first new trams to arrive since the war. In the 1950s, two unprofitable sections of the network were discontinued, and turning loops were installed due to the arrival of single-ended trams, which entered service in 1956. Some of these large-capacity trams were later converted into articulated trams, known as GT5 . As these conversions proved successful, additional GT5 vehicles were built as new vehicles in the late 1960s.

In 1960, lines 5 and 6 were discontinued and replaced by bus services.

=== Plans for shutting down the entire network ===
During the 1970s, as in other West German towns, there were plans to make the city more car-friendly by discontinuing tram services in Augsburg and replacing the system with buses. In 1976, the city council voted against this plan and in favour of continuing tram operations. New trams were ordered, and Königsplatz, the main hub for the tram routes, was rebuilt.

=== Modernising the network ===
Since the 1990s, the network has grown. Line 1 was the first to be extended, in 1994. Line 3, a completely new line which also served the University of Augsburg, went into service in 1996.In 1993, the first low-floor trams entered service in Augsburg.

In 2001, line 4 was extended to Oberhausen Nord and line 2 to the university hospital.

In 2010, line 6 returned to service, now extending as far as Friedberg-West, in the municipality of Friedberg, east of Augsburg.

With the extension of line 3 to Königsbrunn in 2021, the tram system now serves four municipalities and spans approximately 50 kilometres.

== Lines ==
As of 2024, the network has five regular lines and two special lines, as follows:

Regular line	Cross-city route	Lechhausen Neuer Ostfriedhof – Berliner Allee – Königsplatz – Bergstraße – Göggingen	26 stops
Regular line	Cross-city route	Augsburg West P+R – Oberhausen Bf / Helmut-Haller-Platz – Dom / Stadtwerke – Königsplatz – Haunstetter Straße Bf – Sportanlage Süd P+R – Haunstetten Nord	27 stops
Regular line	Radial route	Hauptbahnhof – Königsplatz – Haunstetter Straße Bf – Universität – Innovationspark/LfU – Inninger Straße P+R – Königsbrunn Zentrum	23 stops
Regular line	Radial route	Hauptbahnhof – Königsplatz – Curt-Frenzel-Stadion – Plärrer P+R – Bärenwirt / DRvS – Augsburg Nord P+R	12 stops
Regular line	Cross-city route	Stadtbergen – Pfersee – Hauptbahnhof – Königsplatz – Hochschule Augsburg – Schwaben Center – Rudolf-Diesel-Gymnasium – Friedberg West P+R	25 stops
Special line	Radial route	Hauptbahnhof – Königsplatz – Haunstetter Straße Bf – Universität – Innovationspark/LfU – Fußball-Arena	13 stops
Special line	Radial route	Hauptbahnhof – Messezentrum	9 stops

=== Special Lines ===
The two special lines are lines 8 and 9. Line 8 is the line that goes from the main train station (Hauptbahnhof) to the soccer stadium (Fußball-Arena). This line only runs if there is a soccer game occurring. Line 9 is the line that goes from the main train station (Hauptbahnhof) to the Exhibition Center (Messezentrum). This line only runs if there is an exhibition occurring.

== Timetable ==
Trams are generally scheduled in 5-minute intervals between 05:00-11:00 and 14:00-21:00 from Monday to Friday, with 7.5-minute intervals between 11:00-14:00. From 21:00-0:00, trams operate on a 15-minute schedule, with hourly night buses serving the hours between 0:00-5:00.

On Saturdays, trams generally operate in 20-minute intervals on between 5:00-7:00, 10-minute intervals between 7:00-20:00 and 15-minute intervals between 20:00-0:00.

On Sundays and holidays, trams generally operate in 30-minute intervals between 5:00-7:00 and 23:00-0:00, with 15-minute intervals between 7:00-23:00. During school holidays, the 5-minute intervals are replaced with 7.5-minute intervals.

== Rolling stock ==
As of 2024, the fleet of the Augsburg tram network consists of three high-floor MAN M8C trams, 11 ADtranz GT6M trams, 41 Siemens Combino type NF8, and 27 Flexity Outlook type Cityflex CF8 trams. Stadler is supplying 15 new Tramlink units as a replacement for the M8C and GT6M trams. Entry into service is scheduled for April 2026.

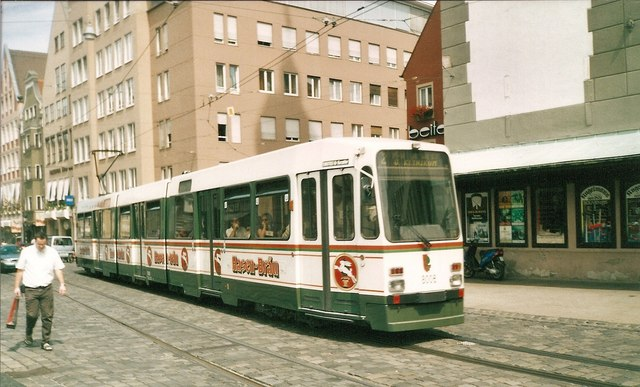
MAN M8C

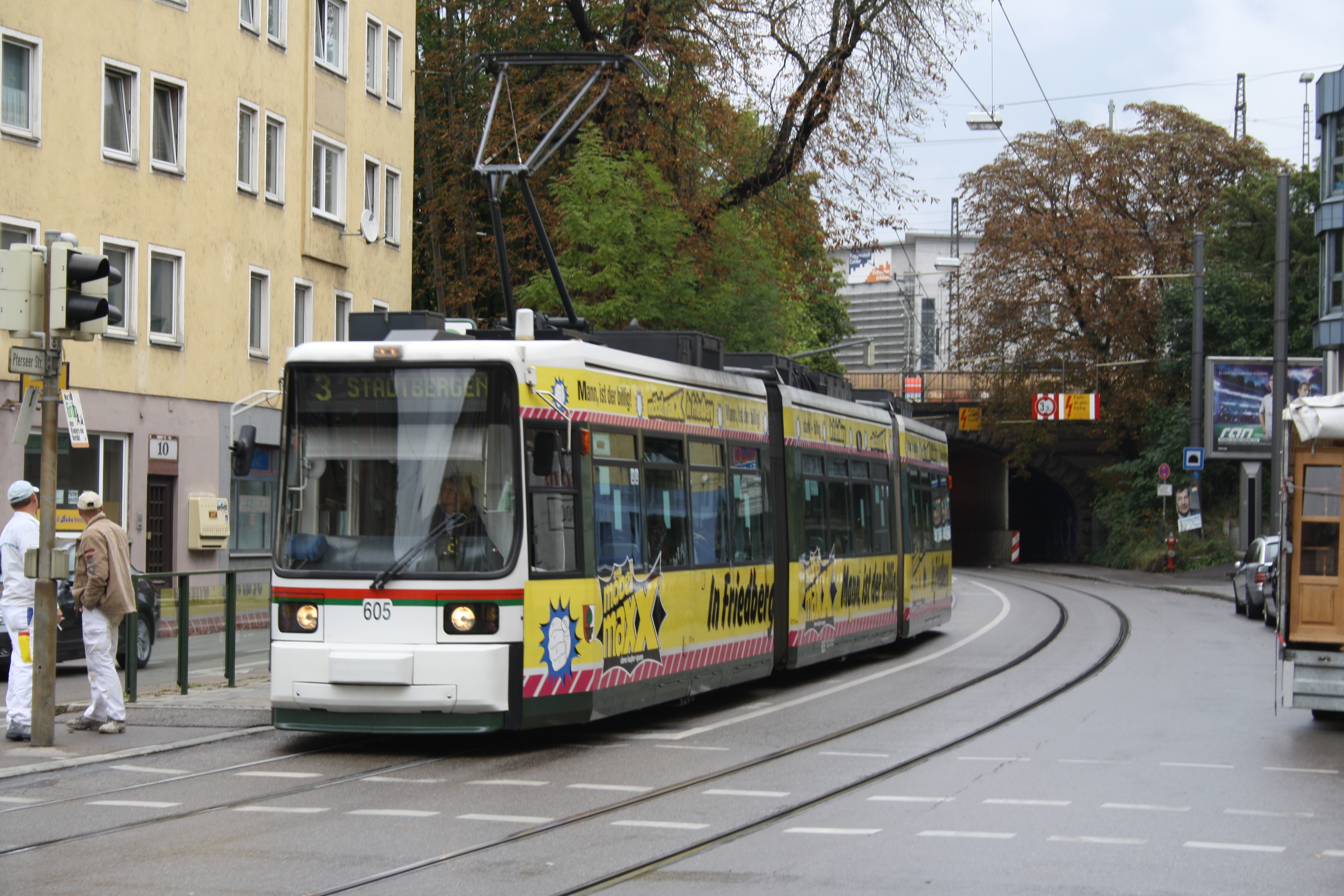
ADtranz GT6M

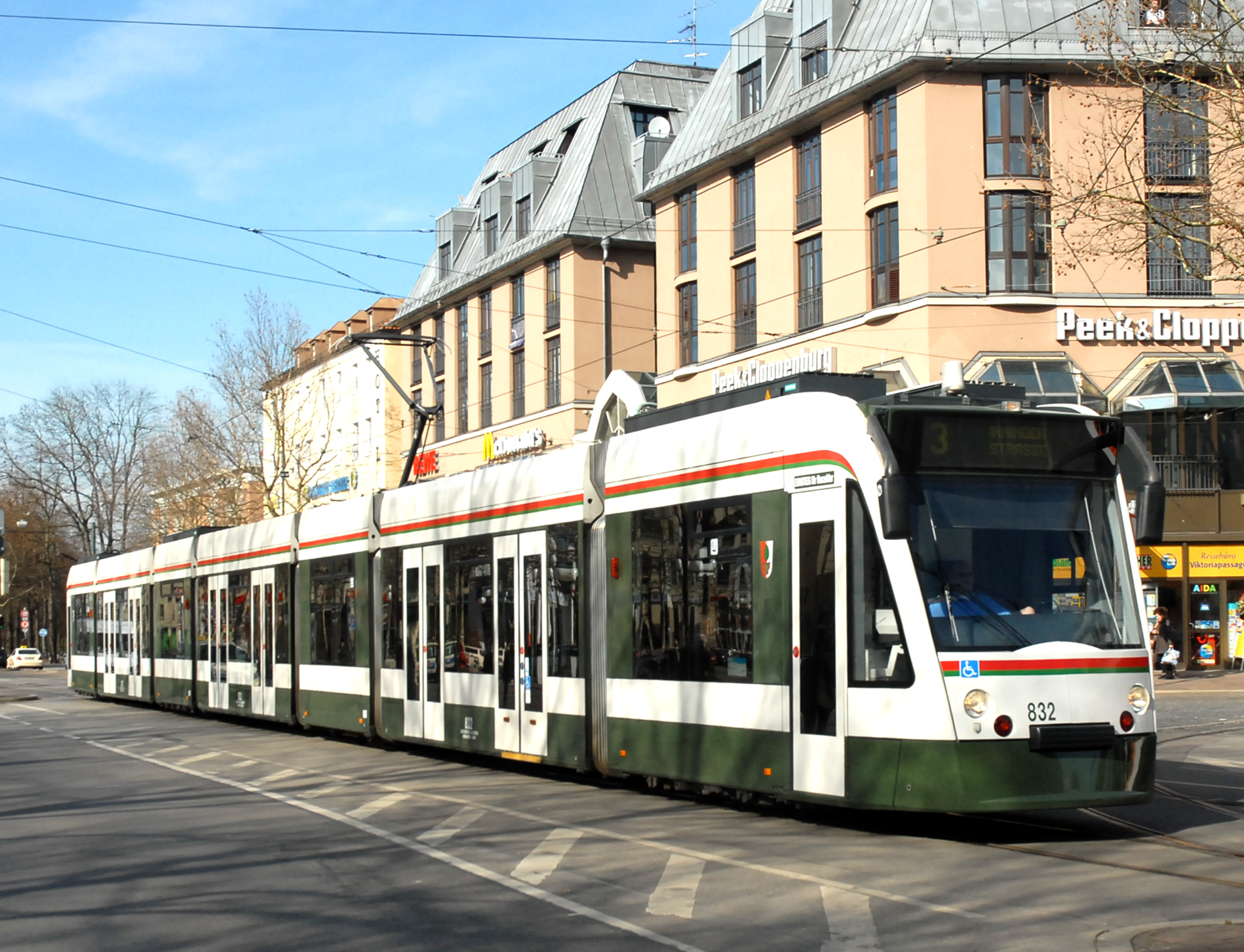
Siemens Combino NF8

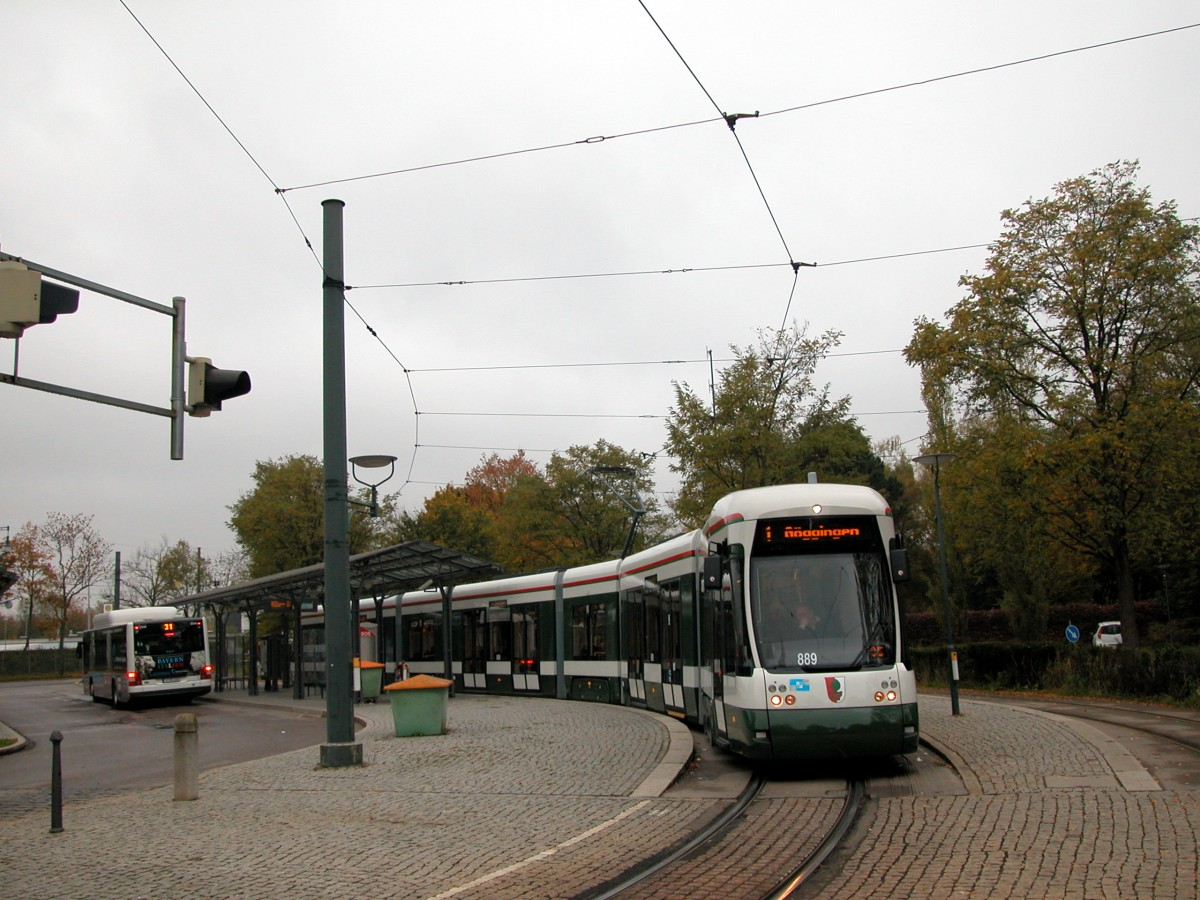
Bombardier Flexity Cityflex CF8
- The MAN M8C are no longer in use in regular service, but are occasionally deployed if necessary until replaced by the Stadler Tramlinks
- The ADtranz GT6M run almost exclusively on Lines 3 and 6, with occasional service on Line 2 during rush hours

In October 2026 they were taken out of service All of them are going to Zagreb(Croatia)

- The Siemens Combino NF8 and Bombardier Flexity Cityflex are in service across the entire network
- In 2026 the Stadler Tramlinks have entered service

== Planned Changes ==
=== Line 5 ===
Line 5 does not exist yet and is still in the planning phase. The line is supposed to start from the main train station (Hauptbahnhof), to the University Hospital (Uniklinik).

== See also ==
- List of town tramway systems in Germany
- Trams in Germany
