= Augsburg-Oberhausen station =

Railway station in Augsburg, Germany

Augsburg Oberhausen
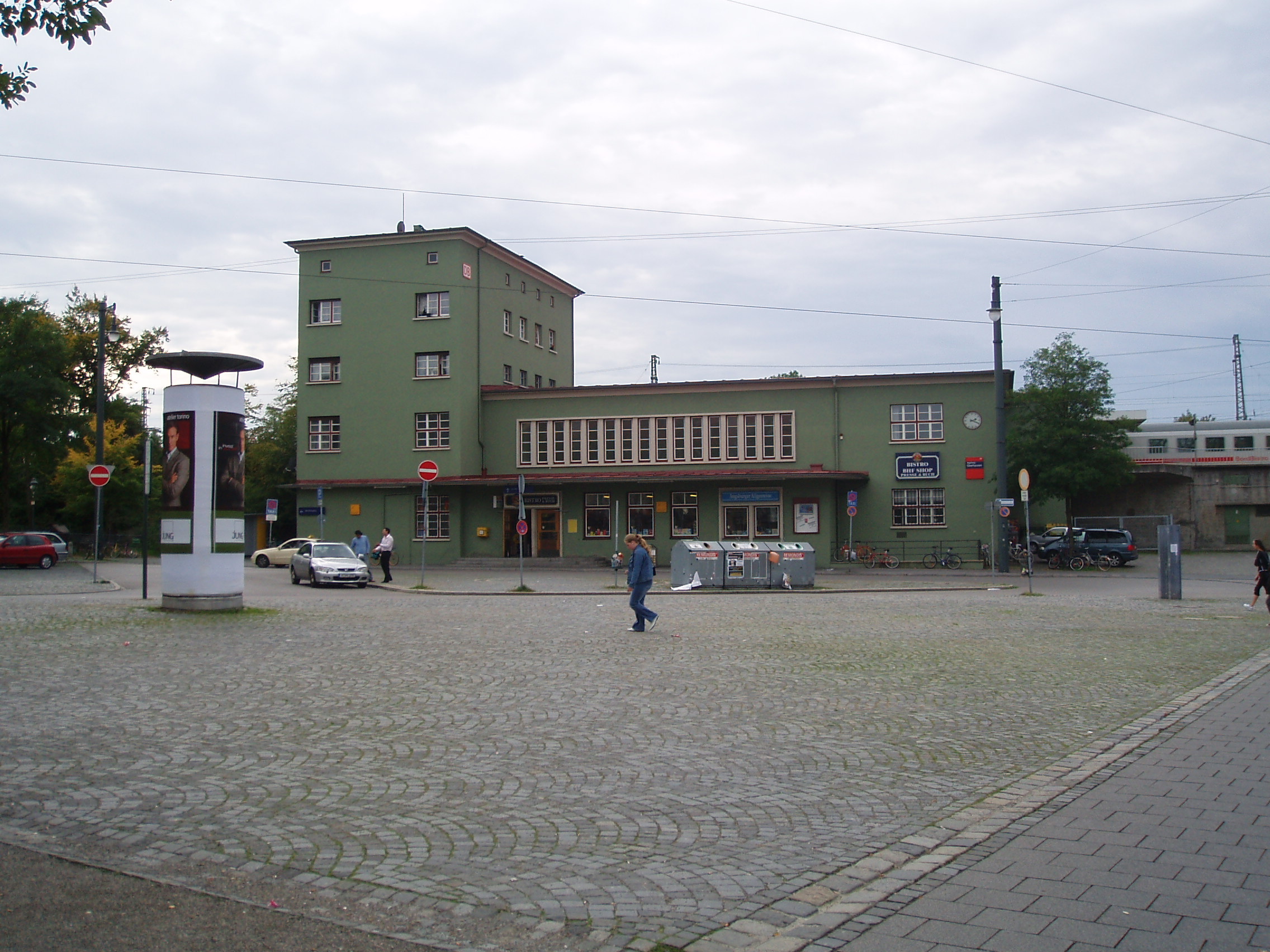
- Entrance building and station forecourt

General information
- Location: Ulmerstr. 53, Oberhausen, Augsburg, Bavaria; Germany
- Coordinates: 48°22′50″N 10°52′22″E
- Owner: Deutsche Bahn
- Operator: DB Netz; DB Station&Service
- Lines: Ulm–Augsburg (KBS 980); Augsburg–Nördlingen (KBS 982)
- Platforms: 7
- Train operators: Bayerische Regiobahn; DB Regio Bayern; Go-Ahead Bayern

Construction
- Accessible: No
- Architectural style: New Objectivity

Other information
- Station code: 224
- DS100 code: MAOB
- IBNR: 8000662
- Category: 4
- Fare zone: : 10 and 20
- Website: www.bahnhof.de; stationsdatenbank.de

History
- Opened: 1932

Passengers
- < 5,000 (2006)

Services
Preceding station		Following station
Neusäß towards Ulm Hbf	RE 9	Augsburg Hbf towards München Hbf
Meitingen towards Würzburg Hbf	RE 80	Augsburg Hbf towards München Hbf
Gersthofen towards Donauwörth	RE 87 Limited service	Augsburg Hbf Terminus
Meitingen towards Aalen Hbf	RE 89	Augsburg Hbf towards München Hbf
Meitingen towards Ansbach	RB 80 Limited service	Augsburg Hbf Terminus
Neusäß towards Dinkelscherben	RB 86	Augsburg Hbf towards München Hbf
Gersthofen towards Donauwörth	RB 87	Augsburg Hbf towards München Hbf
Meitingen towards Aalen Hbf	RB 89	Augsburg Hbf towards Donauwörth
Gersthofen towards Aalen Hbf	RB 89	Augsburg Hbf towards Donauwörth
Preceding station	DB Regio Bayern	Following station
Meitingen towards Nürnberg Hbf	RE 16	Augsburg Hbf Terminus
Preceding station		Following station
Terminus	RB 67	Augsburg Hbf towards Schongau
Neusäß towards Gessertshausen	RB 83	Augsburg Hbf Terminus
Preceding station	Augsburg tram	Following station
St. Thaddäus towards Augsburg West P+R	2	Wertachbrücke towards Haunstetten Nord
Location
- Location within Bavaria Location within Germany Location within Europe

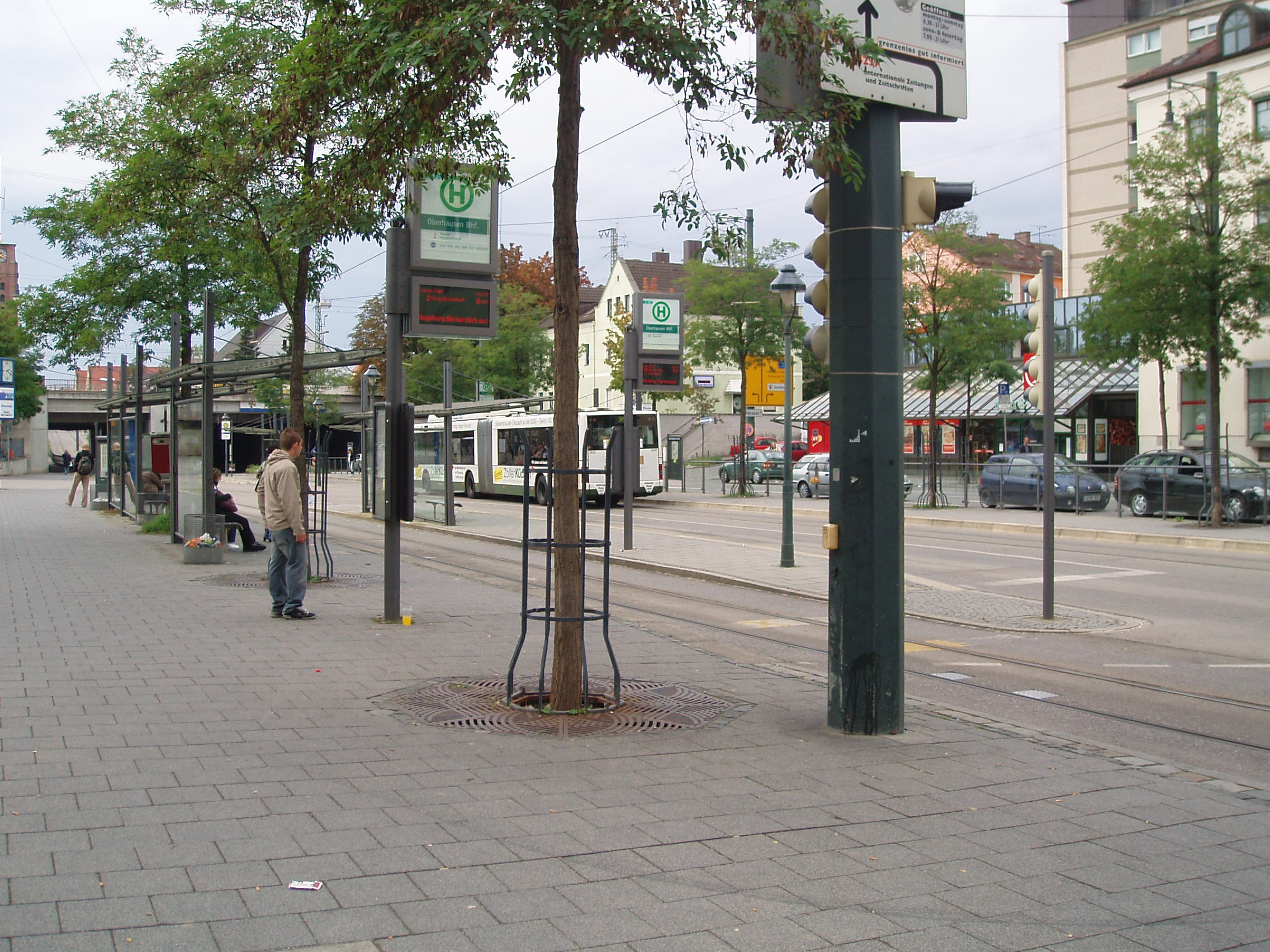
The bus and tram stops in the station forecourt

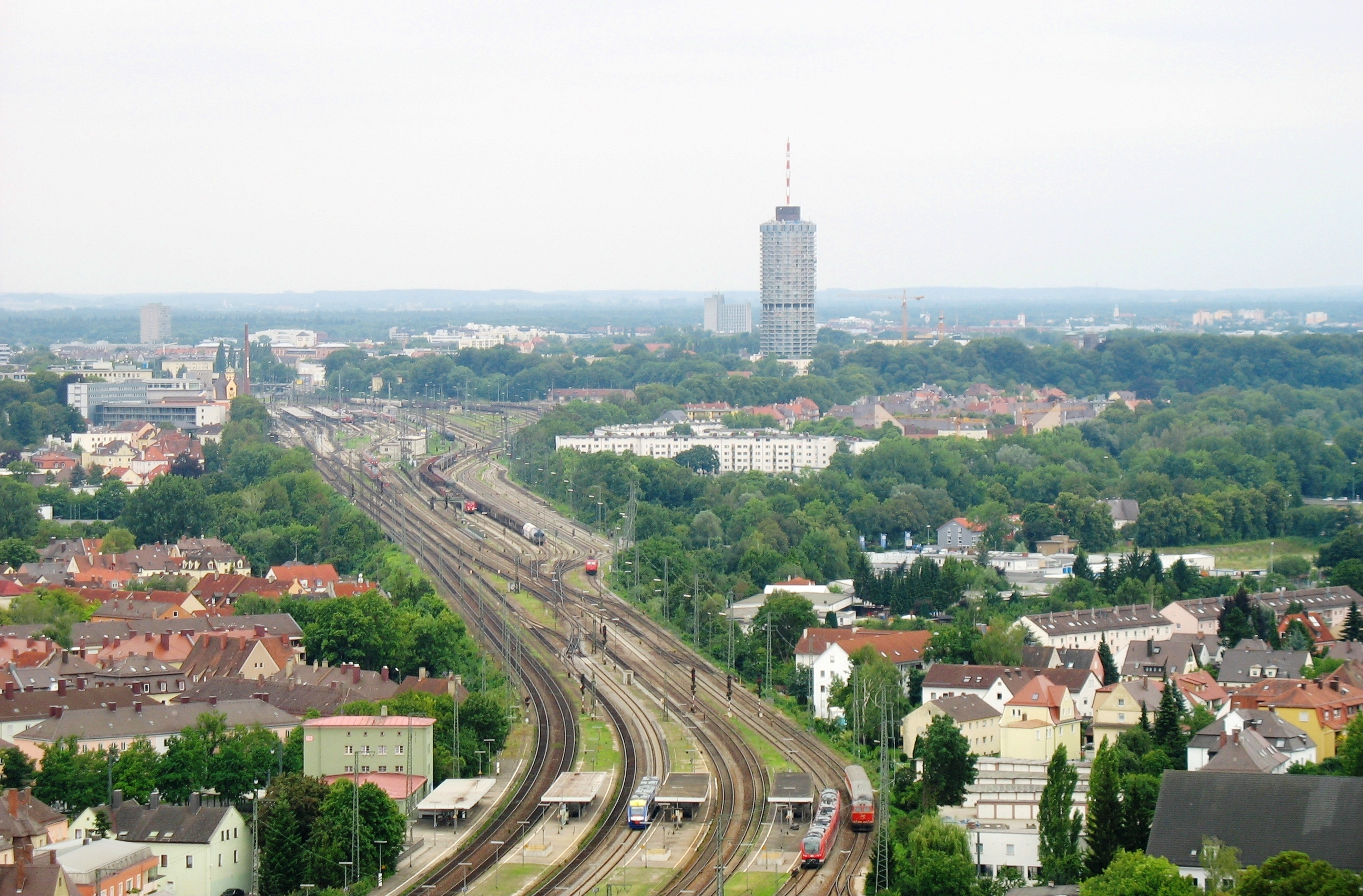
View of the station and platforms, Augsburg Hauptbahnhof and the hotel tower are in the background

Augsburg-Oberhausen station is a keilbahnhof in the northwest of the central Augsburg in the suburb of Oberhausen in the German state of Bavaria. It is the second most important station in the city. It is classified by Deutsche Bahn as a category 4 station. The current station building was built south of the old Oberhauser station in 1931/32, in the New Objectivity style. There is a large tram and bus stop in front of the station building, the exterior of which has recently been renovated.

== Infrastructure ==
Augsburg-Oberhausen is a through station with seven tracks on four platforms. The trains can be reached by a tunnel under the tracks, which runs from the ground floor of the station building. This is not accessible for the disabled. The station building has a ticket machine, a kiosk and a bar.

== Services ==
The Augsburg-Oberhausen station is served by all Regional-Express and Regionalbahn services leaving Augsburg Hauptbahnhof to the north and the west. Thus it serves as a transfer station from the route from Ulm towards Donauwörth and vice versa. The services of Bayerische Regiobahn to or from Schongau normally also begin or end in Augsburg-Oberhausen. Long-distance services do not stop at the station.

Train class	Route		Frequency
RE 9	Ulm – Günzburg – Dinkelscherben – Diedorf – Augsburg-Oberhausen – Augsburg (– Mering – Munich)		60 min
RE 16	Nuremberg – Treuchtlingen – Donauwörth – Mertingen – Meitingen – Augsburg-Oberhausen – Augsburg		120 min
RE 80; RE 89; RB 89	Munich – Mering – Augsburg – Augsburg-Oberhausen – Donauwörth (split) –	Treuchtlingen – Ansbach – Würzburg (RE 80)	120 min
RE 80; RE 89; RB 89	Munich – Mering – Augsburg – Augsburg-Oberhausen – Donauwörth (split) –	Nördlingen – Aalen (RE/RB 89)	120 min
RE 87	Augsburg – Augsburg-Oberhausen – Meitingen – Donauwörth		One train Sa+Su towards Donauwörth
RB 67	Augsburg-Oberhausen – Augsburg – Mering – Geltendorf – Dießen – Weilheim (– Peißenberg – Schongau)		60 min
RB 80	Augsburg – Augsburg-Oberhausen – Donauwörth – Treuchtlingen – Ansbach	One train towards Ansbach Mo-Fr	One train towards Ansbach Mo-Fr
RB 83	Augsburg – Augsburg-Oberhausen – Neusäß – Gessertshausen		30 mins to hourly in the peak
RB 86	Dinkelscherben – Diedorf – Augsburg-Oberhausen – Augsburg – Mering – Munich		60 min
RB 87	Donauwörth – Mertingen – Meitingen – Augsburg Oberhausen – Augsburg – Mering – Munich		60 min

Public transport at Oberhausen station consists of tram line 2 (Augsburg-West–Haunstetten-Nord), city bus route 35 (Bergstraße–Pfersee-Süd), night bus route 91 (Königsplatz–Stadtbergen) and several regional bus lines. As a result, it also plays a major role as a hub for public transport and is well used at peak times. The tram and bus stops are located directly outside the station.

Augsburg-Oberhausen station – public transport connections
Line	Route	Frequency
	P&R Augsburg-West – Augsburg-Haunstetten Nord	7.5 min.*
35	Augsburg-Bergstraße – Augsburg-Pfersee Süd	15 min.*
91	Stadtbergen – Deuringen – Steppach – Augsburg-Königsplatz – Augsburg-Pfersee – Leitershofen – Stadtbergen	60 min.
Regional bus 410	Augsburg-Eberlestraße – Reicherstein	two pairs of services
Regional bus 500	Augsburg-Hauptbahnhof – Aystetten-West	15 min.*
Regional bus 501	Augsburg-Hauptbahnhof – Aystetten – Welden	30 min.*
Regional bus 503	Augsburg-Hauptbahnhof – Schlipsheim-Mitte	60 min.*
Regional bus 504	Augsburg-Hauptbahnhof – Streitheim-Ort	variable intervals
Regional bus 506	Augsburg-Hauptbahnhof – Wörleschwang church	variable intervals
Regional bus 507	Augsburg-Hauptbahnhof – Dinkelscherben	variable intervals
Regional bus 600	Augsburg-Hauptbahnhof – Krumbach bus station	30 min.*
Regional bus 601	Augsburg-Hauptbahnhof – Anhausen school	variable intervals
Regional bus 602	Augsburg-Hauptbahnhof – Diedorf station	variable intervals
* The service intervals refer to busy periods - the timetable is different in the evening and at night as well as during school holidays.

== Freight ==
In addition to its important role for passengers, the station is also significant for freight: containers are transhipped from rail to road on the sidings. A new unloading yard in the multi-modal terminal is expected from 2012/2013 to relieve the Oberhausen container terminal, which is at the centre of the Augsburg–Gersthofen–Neusäß triangle.

== Future ==
As part of the establishment of the Augsburg S-Bahn the station is gaining an increasing importance: up to three lines (to Dinkelscherben, Donauwörth and Fischach) will stop here in the future and so strengthen its role as a key interchange point for the districts of Oberhausen and Kriegshaber.

In recent years there have been several remodelling and renovation projects, especially of the station forecourt and the exterior facade. However, the construction of a reversing track, which is required for this project, has not been carried out. This project—and the introduction of the Augsburg S-Bahn—is still at the planning stage.
