= Munich–Augsburg railway =

German railway line

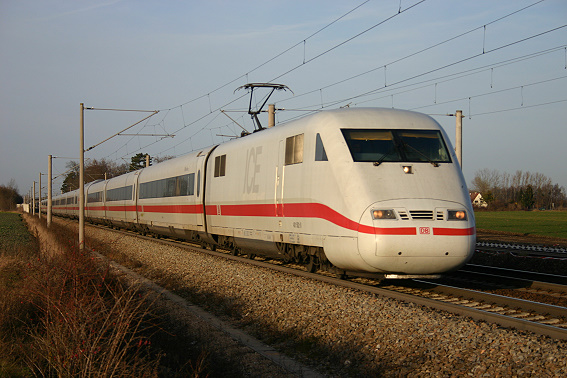
- ICE 1 in Augsburg-Hochzoll on the Munich–Augsburg line

Overview
- Owner: DB Netz
- Line number: 5503 (Munich–Augsburg); 5543 (Munich–Mammendorf); 5581 (Olching–Augsburg)
- Locale: Bavaria, Germany

Service
- Route number: 980, 999.3, 999.4

Technical
- Line length: 61.9 km (38.5 mi)
- Number of tracks: 4 or more
- Track gauge: 1,435 mm (4 ft 8 1/2 in) standard gauge
- Electrification: 15 kV/16.7 Hz AC catenary
- Operating speed: 230 km/h (140 mph) (maximum)

The Munich–Augsburg line connects Munich and Augsburg in the German state of Bavaria. It was built by the Munich-Augsburg Railway Company and opened in 1840. It was nationalised in 1846 and extended to Ulm in 1854. The line between Augsburg and Munich is a major traffic axis and part of the Magistrale for Europe from Budapest through Vienna to Paris.

== History ==
The line was built by the Munich-Augsburg Railway Company (German: München-Augsburg Eisenbahn-Gesellschaft) and opened in 1839 and 1840. The Munich-Augsburg Railway Company was nationalised on 1 June 1846 and taken over by the Royal Bavarian State Railways (Königlich Bayerische Staats-Eisenbahnen). The line became part of Bavarian Maximilian’s Railway (Bayerische Maximiliansbahn) and was extended to Ulm on 1 May 1854. After the nationalisation of the line in 1846 a new Augsburg station was built at Rosenauberg along with new rail facilities in nearby Oberhausen. The old stations at the Roten Tor (Red Gate) and in Oberhausen were abandoned.

Between 26 June 1965 and 3 October 1965, two pairs of trains per day using Class E 03 locomotives ran at 200 km/h on the line for the 1965 International Transport Exhibition in Munich, taking 26 minutes to complete the run. From May 1968 two trains, "Blauer Enzian" and "Rheinblitz", ran on the same route at a scheduled speed of 200 km/h.

In 1977 the 42.7 km long section between Lochhausen and Augsburg-Hochzoll, was put into operation with a regular permitted speed of 200 km/h. For the first time in Germany numerous trains could reach this speed in regular commercial operations.

=== Upgrade ===
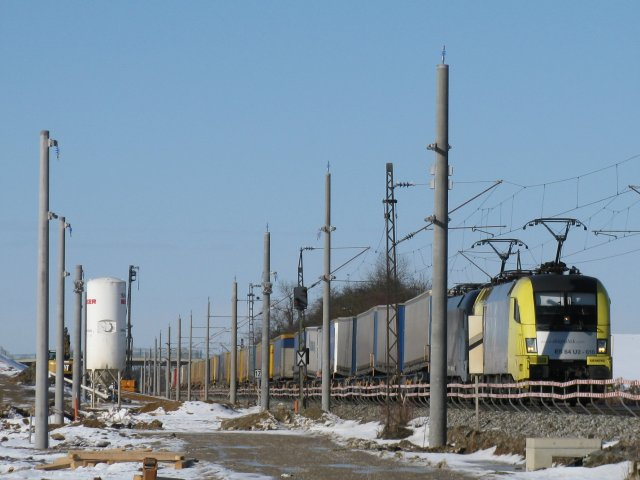
Freight train passes to new work at Mammendorf, February 2010.

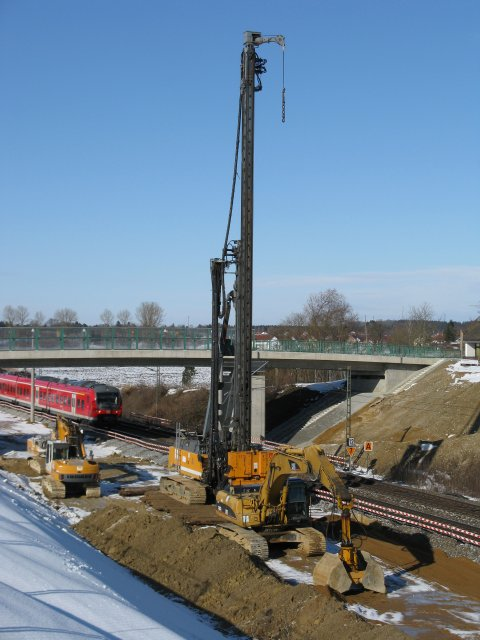
New work near Hattenhofen

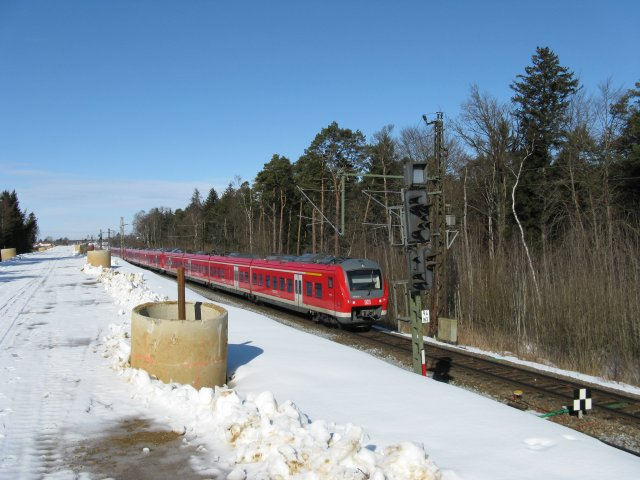
New line being built on sand embankment at Haspelmoor

The 43 km section between Augsburg and Olching line was rebuilt to four-tracks between 1998 and 2011 to carry significantly more traffic. One pair of tracks was dedicated to regional services (RB, RE) and goods traffic and the other to (IC/EC) and high-speed traffic (ICE) services. Heavy and more slowly running freight trains no longer obstruct the passage of faster ICEs. The permitted speed on the high-speed tracks is now 230 km/h. Infrastructure for regional trains allows operations at 160 km/h. On the line between Olching and Munich, freight, regional trains, and the Munich S-Bahn have their own tracks.

The railway upgrading work was divided into six sections for planning purposes. Work began on the western section between Augsburg and Kissing in February 1998 and the new tracks were brought into service in 2003. A new bridge was built over the Lech in Augsburg in 2002 and in the same year work began on the eastern section between Mering and Olching.

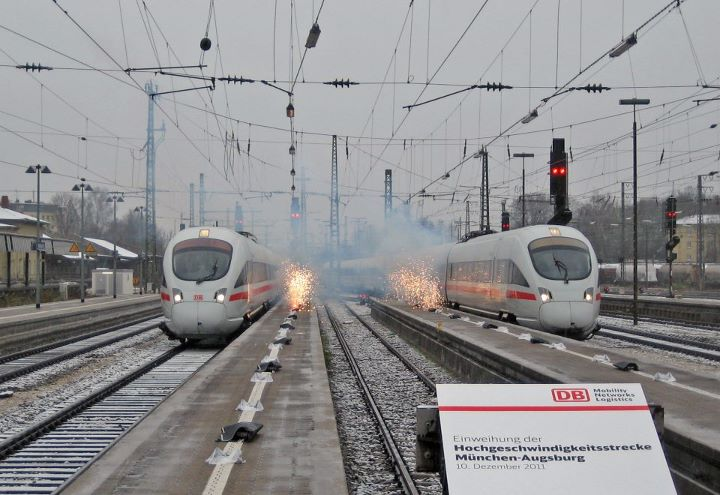
Dedication on 10 December 2011

On 6 June 2011, the conversion of the line to four-track operation was completed, but the two high-speed tracks were not yet passable at 230 km/h. On 10 December 2011 the railway was dedicated with a new speed limit of 230 km/h after 13 years of building.

==== Dates and facts ====
- Length of the Augsburg–Munich line: 61 km (38 mi)
- Length of the line being upgraded: 44 km (27 mi)
- Line speed: 230 kilometres per hour (140 mph) for ICE traffic; 160 kilometres per hour (99 mph) for regional and goods traffic
- Completion date: 2011

The upgrading involved: acquisition of 95.3 hectares of land, 43 km of additional railway embankment, 7.5 km of new retaining walls, 116 km of new track and 104 points moved, 52 railway and 19 road bridges reconstructed or adapted, 46 km of noise barriers, nine island platforms and three passing lines adapted or rebuilt

In the federal transport investment plan for 2010, federal funding for the project was estimated to be €556 million for the first stage of development (2006 prices). €303.5 million had been spent up to 2005. €215 million of federal funds were to be invested between 2006 and 2010. Beyond this period a shortfall of €37.6 million had to be made up.

== Operations ==
The line between Augsburg and Munich is a major traffic axis and part of the Magistrale (trunk line) for Europe from Budapest through Vienna to Paris. It is used daily by about 300 trains and is one of Germany’s busiest line with a mixture of goods trains, regional passenger trains and long-distance high-speed trains.

Each hour an Intercity-Express train and an InterCity train run from Munich via Ulm to Stuttgart. Additional ICE trains run from Munich to Augsburg, branching to Nuremberg or Würzburg and on to further destinations. A similar service pattern also operates in the reverse direction.

Regional-Express trains also run hourly between Munich and Augsburg, alternating to/from Ulm and Donauwörth.

From Mammendorf to Munich central station the line runs parallel to line S3 of the Munich S-Bahn of the MVV.
