= Pfersee =

Coordinates: 48°22′00″N 10°52′05″E

Pfersee is a part of the city of Augsburg, Bavaria, with some 25.000 inhabitants on the western shore of river Wertach. In 1911 Pfersee was incorporated to Augsburg.

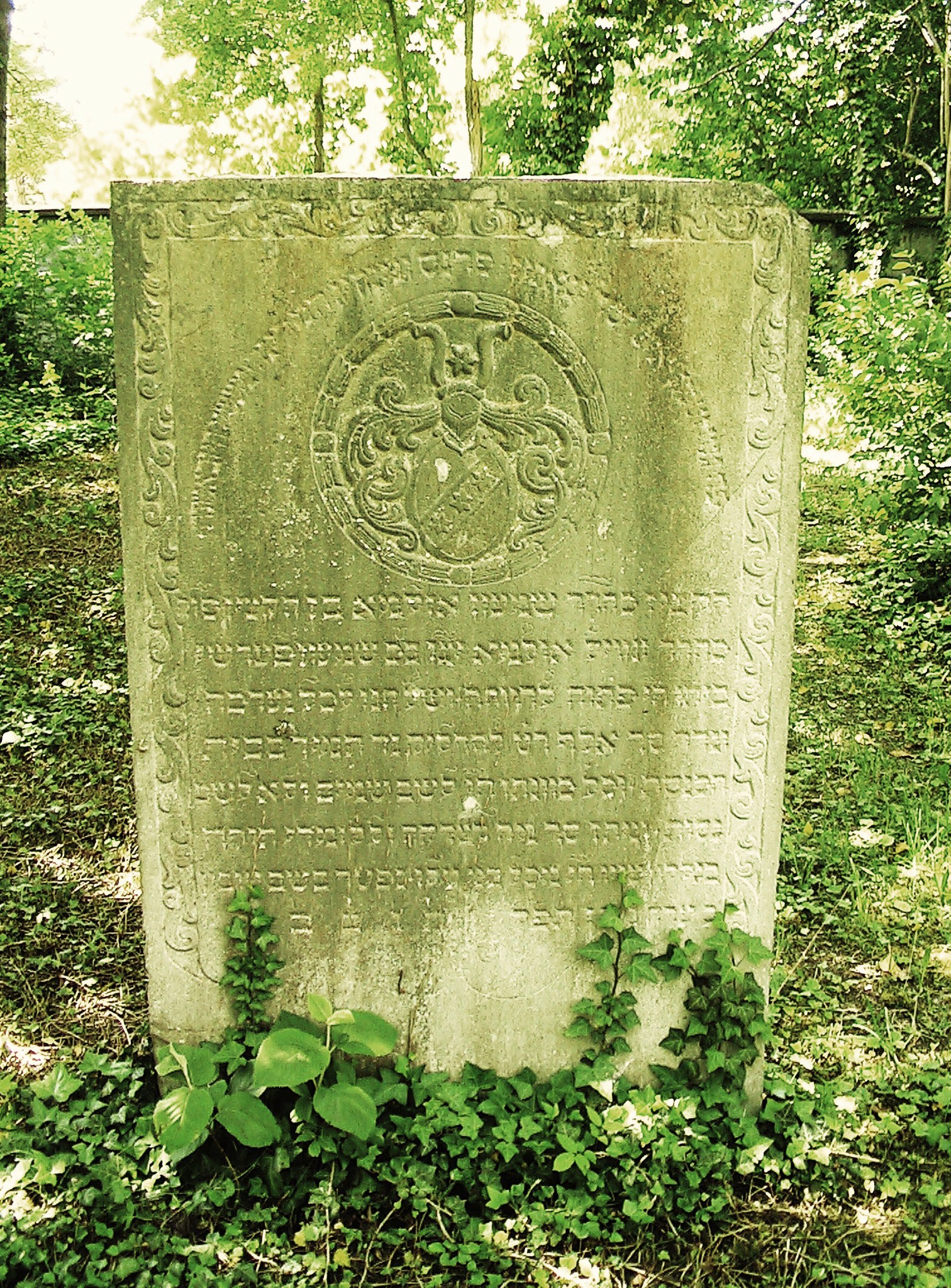
Hebrew grave marker at the Jewish cemetery Pfersee in Augsburg, Germany

The name Pfersee probably derives from “fert” (Furt), meaning a ford (crossing).

Pfersee is first mentioned in 8th century, but there also are important archeological findings such as a brazen horse-head which was part of an equestrian statue, probably dedicated to Emperor Hadrian.

From 1560 until 1875 in Pfersee there was a noted Jewish community with a number of renowned chairmen, rabbis and scholars, mainly from the Ulmo (Ginsburg) family, who until the beginning of the 19th century was in possession of the so-called “Pfersee manuscript”, the oldest almost complete surviving handwritten edition of the Babylonian Talmud, dated from 14th century, which now is at the Bavarian State Library in Munich. in 1627 the Jewish community of Pfersee along with the neighboring Jewish communities of Steppach and Kriegshaber established a common Jewish cemetery, today usually attributed to Kriegshaber, which became part of Augsburg in 1916.
