= Kissing, Bavaria =

Kissing
- Municipality
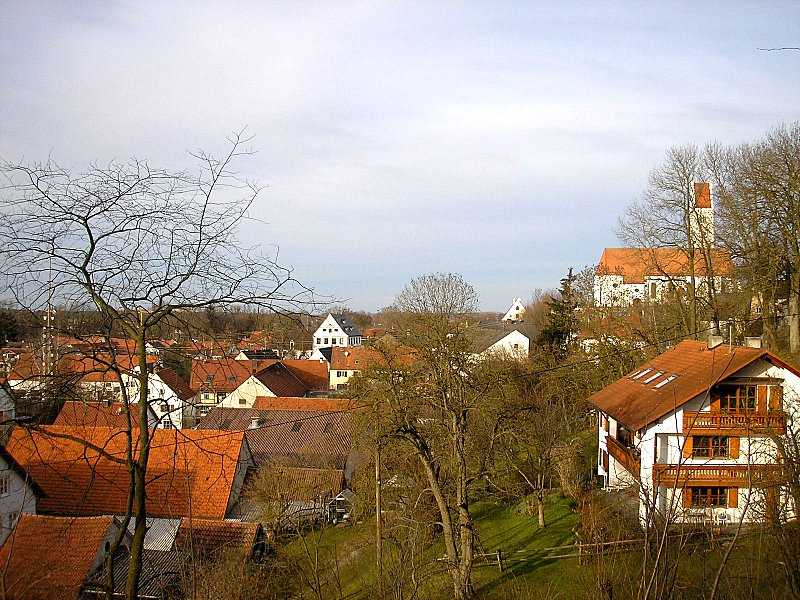
- View towards the old part of Kissing

- Coat of arms

- Location of Kissing within Aichach-Friedberg district
- Interactive map of Kissing
- Location within Germany Location within Bavaria
- Coordinates: 48°18′N 10°59′E
- Country: Germany
- State: Bavaria
- Admin. region: Schwaben
- District: Aichach-Friedberg

Government
  - Mayor (2019–25): Reinhard Gürtner (CSU)

Area
  - Total: 23.12 km^{2} (8.93 sq mi)
- Elevation: 523 m (1,716 ft)

Population (2025-12-31)
  - Total: 11,671
  - Density: 504.8/km^{2} (1,307/sq mi)
- Time zone: UTC+01:00 (CET)
  - Summer (DST): UTC+02:00 (CEST)
- Postal codes: 86438
- Dialling codes: 08233
- Vehicle registration: AIC
- Website: www.kissing.de

Kissing (German pronunciation: [ˈkɪsɪŋ]) is a municipality in the Aichach-Friedberg district, in Bavaria, Germany. It is located just 10 km (6.2 mi) south of Augsburg and has about 11,200 inhabitants (2007).

Kissing was first mentioned in a document in 1050 AD as Chissingin, it was a minor regional centre of rule and jurisdiction called a Hofmark. In even earlier times, around 500, there was a thing hill nearby, which was later swept away by the floods of the river Lech.

The surname Kissinger (as in Henry Kissinger) means inhabitant of Kissing or Kissingen. The English meaning of the village's name has resulted in its being the butt of jokes in popular media. For instance, The Grand Tour featured the village in the 2017 episode "[censored] to [censored]", as part of a road trip from Wank via Kissing, Petting, and Fucking to Wedding.
