= Donauwörth station =

Railway station in Donauwörth, Germany

Donauwörth
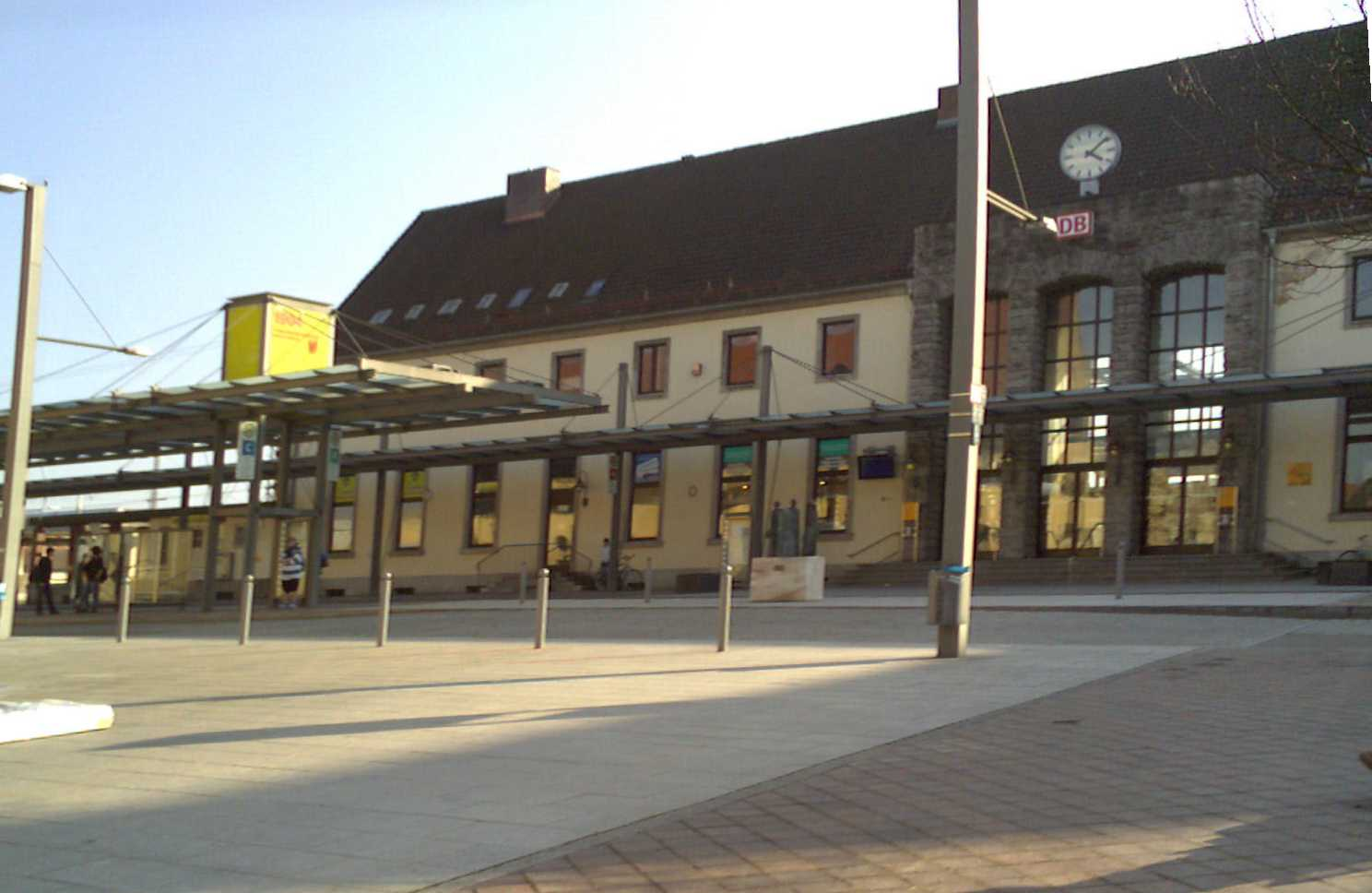
- Station building and bus station

General information
- Location: Bahnhofstr. 34, Donauwörth, Bavaria; Germany
- Coordinates: 48°42′52″N 10°46′18″E
- Owner: Deutsche Bahn
- Operator: DB Station&Service
- Lines: Donauwörth–Treuchtlingen (KBS 910); Ingolstadt–Neuoffingen (KBS 993); Augsburg–Nördlingen (KBS 910, 995)
- Platforms: 7

Construction
- Accessible: Yes

Other information
- Station code: 1265
- DS100 code: MDT
- IBNR: 8000078
- Category: 4
- Fare zone: : 94
- Website: www.bahnhof.de

History
- Opened: 15 November 1877; 148 years ago
- Electrified: 10 May 1935; 91 years ago
Services
Preceding station	DB Fernverkehr	Following station
Treuchtlingen towards Berlin Gesundbrunnen or Hamburg-Altona	ICE 18	Augsburg Hbf towards München Hbf
Treuchtlingen towards Hamburg-Altona	ICE 24	Augsburg Hbf towards Innsbruck Hbf or Schwarzach-St.Veit
Preceding station		Following station
Tapfheim towards Ulm Hbf	RB 15	Genderkingen towards Ingolstadt Hbf
Preceding station	DB Regio Bayern	Following station
Treuchtlingen towards Nürnberg Hbf	RE 7	Augsburg Hbf towards Lindau-Reutin
Otting-Weilheim towards Nürnberg Hbf	RE 16	Mertingen towards Oberstdorf
Treuchtlingen towards Nürnberg Hbf	RE 17	Augsburg Hbf towards Oberstdorf
Preceding station		Following station
Mertingen Bahnhof towards Würzburg Hbf	RE 80	Otting-Weilheim towards München Hbf
Terminus	RB 87	Bäumenheim towards München Hbf
Wörnitzstein towards Aalen Hbf	RB 89	Terminus
Wörnitzstein towards Aalen Hbf	RE 89	Mertingen towards München Hbf
Location
- Location within Bavaria Location within Germany Location within Europe

Donauwörth station is a railway station in southern Germany. It is located south-west of the city of Donauwörth in Bavaria. The station is at the intersection of the Augsburg–Nördlingen, the Donauwörth–Treuchtlingen and the Ingolstadt–Neuoffingen railways.

== History ==
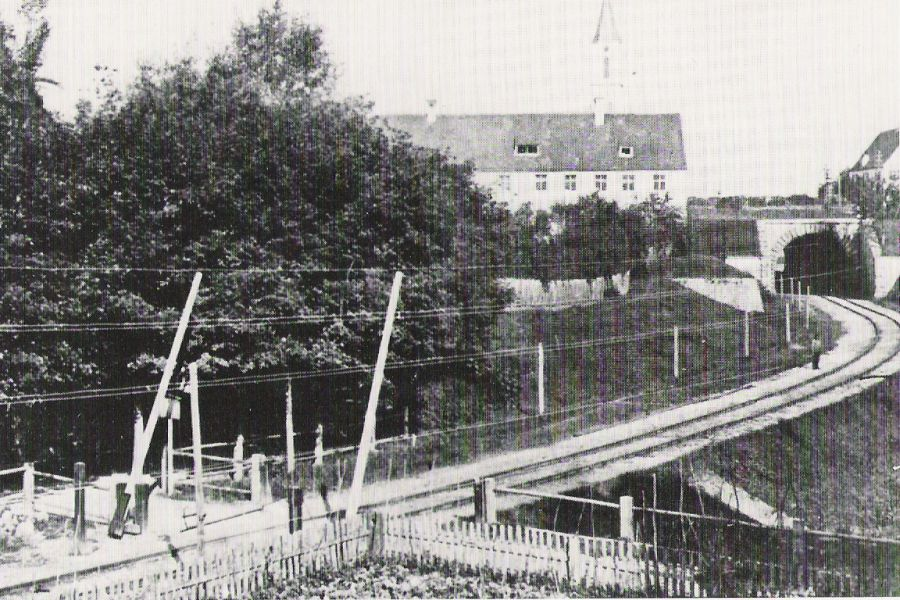
The old photograph shows the railway line and the north-west portal of the old railway tunnel in Donauwörth. Trains ran here until 1877 to the old Donauwörth station lying just past the tunnel.

The first train ran to Donauwörth in 1847. The station was located at that time in an area now occupied by a street called Promenade, one kilometre closer to the city centre than the present station. In 1861, a railway siding was built from this station to serve steam shipping on the Danube in the area of the modern Zirgesheimer Straße. The station was located directly next to a former 125 metre long railway tunnel. The tunnel is now usable by pedestrians and cyclists. During the Second World War, it was used for the manufacture of war munitions.

The railway from Neuoffingen to Regensburg was opened in 1877. This crossed the existing line to Augsburg in Donauwörth. Therefore, the present Donauwörth station was built, from 1874 to 1877, in the southwest of the city and it was opened on 15 November 1877. In the Second World War Donauwörth station was destroyed in air attacks on 11 and 19 April 1945. It was reconstructed from 1948 to 1953. In 2001, the station forecourt was redesigned as a bus station.

== Operations ==
In the 2026 timetable, the following services stop at the station:

=== Long distance ===
Donauwörth station is served several times daily by Intercity Express services on the line from Munich via Hanover to Hamburg.

Line	Route	Frequency
ICE 18	Hamburg-Altona – Hamburg – Berlin – Halle – Erfurt – Nuremberg – Donauwörth – Augsburg – Munich	Every 2 hours
ICE 24	Hamburg-Altona – Hamburg – Hannover – Göttingen – Kassel-Wilhelmshöhe – Würzburg – Donauwörth – Augsburg – Munich (– Rosenheim – Wörgl – Schwarzach-St. Veit)	Some trains

=== Regional services ===
In Donauwörth, Regionalbahn services intersect on the Ries Railway to Aalen, the Danube Valley Railway from Ulm to Regensburg and the line from Augsburg to Nuremberg. Since the commissioning of the high-speed line from Nuremberg to Ingolstadt, some Intercity-Express services have been discontinued and replaced by Regional-Express services, creating a direct connection to Nuremberg. In the opposite direction the Allgäu-Franken-Express creates a through service to Lindau and Oberstdorf. The long-planned Fugger-Express was introduced on the Munich–Augsburg–Donauwörth–Aalen route at the timetable change on 13 December 2009. This means that almost all regional services to Augsburg continue to Munich.

Line	Route	Frequency	Comments
RE 16	Nuremberg – Treuchtlingen – Donauwörth – Augsburg	Every 2 hours	
RE 80	Würzburg Hbf – Ansbach – Treuchtlingen – Donauwörth – Augsburg – Mering – Munich	Every 2 hours	In Donauwörth split/joined with the RE 89 from/to Aalen.
RB 87	(Nördlingen –) Donauwörth – Augsburg – Mering – Munich	Hourly, half-hourly in peak Donauwörth–Augsburg	Some trains to/from Nördlingen in peak
RB 89; RE 89	Aalen – Nördlingen – Donauwörth (– Munich)	Hourly Aalen – Donauwörth, every 2 hours Donauwörth – Munich	Through trains from/to Munich operate as the RE 89 and are coupled with the RE 80. The trains starting and ending in Donauwörth run as the RB 89.
RB 15	Ulm – Neu-Ulm – Günzburg – Donauwörth – Ingolstadt (– Ingolstadt Nord) /– Regensburg	Hourly	Through connection from/to Regensburg on Sat and Sun

(as of December 2025)

== Facilities ==
The station has a ticket office, Service Store, book store and waiting room. Next to the station there is a car park for rail passengers and bike racks.

== Project ==
The city of Donauwörth seeks to modernise and improve the accessibility of the station by the installation of lifts on all platforms. This is estimated to cost €3.2 to 3.7 million and sources of finance are not yet clear. Another project that has long been pursued, however, is the extension of the railway underpass to the south side of the station on Industriestraße. This would improve access to the Eurocopter plant.
