= Arverio =

German railway operator

Arverio Deutschland GmbH
- Industry: Rail transport
- Founded: 28 January 2014
- Headquarters: Stuttgart, Germany
- Key people: Stefanie Petersen (CFO), Peter Recht (CTO), Arno Beugel (COO)
- Owner: ÖBB (since 2024)
- Number of employees: 1400
- Website: www.arverio.de

Arverio Deutschland GmbH, with brand name Arverio, before July 2024 under the name Go-Ahead Verkehrsgesellschaft Deutschland GmbH, is a railway operator in Germany. It is a wholly owned subsidiary of Austrian state-owned rail operator ÖBB, and was part of the United Kingdom-based Go-Ahead Group up till its sale to ÖBB was completed on 1 February 2024.

Go-Ahead secured its first contract in the German rail market in November 2015 to operate several regional rail lines in the vicinity of Stuttgart; it took over services from the incumbent operator Deutsche Bahn (DB) on 9 June 2019. Multiple other contracts to operate other passenger services, such as in Munich and Lindau, have been awarded in the following years. Go-Ahead Deutschland has procured a mixed fleet of Stadler FLIRT electric multiple units (EMUs) and Siemens-built double-decker EMUs to operate these services.

== History ==
Logo of Go-Ahead Baden-Württemberg

Logo of Go-Ahead Bayern

In November 2015, Go-Ahead Deutschland was awarded its first rail contract in the Germany market by the Baden-Württemberg public transport authority Nahverkehrsgesellschaft Baden-Württemberg from June 2019. Covering multiple regional rail lines around the city of Stuttgart, the combined revenues generated were expected to reach roughly €1.6bn across the life of the contract, which covers operations between June 2019 and 2032. On 9 June 2019, operations commenced as contracted, taking over from the previous operator, the state-owned railway company Deutsche Bahn (DB). In response to gains by competing companies, DB reportedly launched efforts to reduce costs and retain as much of its profitable regional services as possible.

Over the following years, Go-Ahead Deutschland pursued various other opportunities in the German rail sector. During June 2017, the company was awarded a separate contract to operate Network 3A ‘Murrbahn’ routes from December 2019 by Nahverkehrsgesellschaft Baden-Württemberg and the Bavarian rail authority Bayerische Eisenbahngesellschaft (BEG). Under this contract, it operate services between Stuttgart and Nürnberg, covering 1.3 million km per year, starting in December 2019 and ending in 2032.

In August 2017, yet another contract was issued to Go-Ahead Deutschland for the operation of ‘E-Netz Allgäu’ regional trains between Munich and Lindau by the Baden-Wurttemberg public transport authority and the Bavarian rail authority. This contract, which has a set timeframe of 12 years, covers six lines and 71 stations, was a significant expansion to Go-Ahead’s German rail business, which employed 1,000 people in Bavaria and Baden-Wurttemberg and comprises a fleet of 144 modern electric trains by the end of 2022, growing Go-Ahead’s total German rail business to annually cover 20 million train kilometres. Under the terms of the contact, Go-Ahead operates upon tracks, stations and signals owned and maintained by DB; in common with other third-party operators, Go-Ahead pays access fees for its use of the network to DB.

On 12 October 2023 the purchase agreement for the acquisition of the company by ÖBB was signed, and the completion of the sales process is expected in 2023 after competition law approvals by the European Commission (EC). The sale was completed on 1 February 2024 following approval from the EC. Trains on the network continue to use the Go-Ahead name in the short term.

== Services ==
Line	Network	Route	Contract commences	Contract finishes
MEX 13	1B Rems-Fils	Stuttgart – Aalen – Crailsheim	June 2019	December 2032
MEX 16	1B Rems-Fils	Stuttgart – Geislingen – Ulm	June 2019	December 2032
RE 1	1C Franken-Enz	Karlsruhe – Stuttgart – Aalen	June 2019	December 2032
RE 8	1C Franken-Enz	Stuttgart – Heilbronn – Lauda – Würzburg	June 2019	December 2032
RE 90	3A Murrbahn	Stuttgart – Schwäbisch-Hessental – Crailsheim – Nuremberg	December 2019	December 2032
RE 72	E-Netz Allgäu	München – Buchloe – Memmingen	December 2021	December 2033
RB 92	E-Netz Allgäu	Memmingen – Lindau-Reutin	December 2021	December 2033
RE 96	E-Netz Allgäu	München – Buchloe – Memmingen – Lindau-Reutin	December 2021	December 2033
RE 80	Augsburger Netze (Los 1)	Würzburg – Ansbach – Treuchtlingen – Donauwörth – Augsburg – München	December 2022	December 2034
RB 87	Augsburger Netze (Los 1)	Donauwörth – Augsburg – München	December 2022	December 2034
RE 9	Augsburger Netze (Los 1)	Ulm – Dinkelscherben – Augsburg – München	December 2022	December 2034
RB 86	Augsburger Netze (Los 1)	Dinkelscherben – Augsburg – München	December 2022	December 2034
RE 89	Augsburger Netze (Los 1)	Aalen – Nördlingen – Donauwörth – Augsburg – München	December 2022	December 2034
RB 89	Augsburger Netze (Los 1)	Aalen – Nördlingen – Donauwörth	December 2022	December 2034

== Rolling stock ==
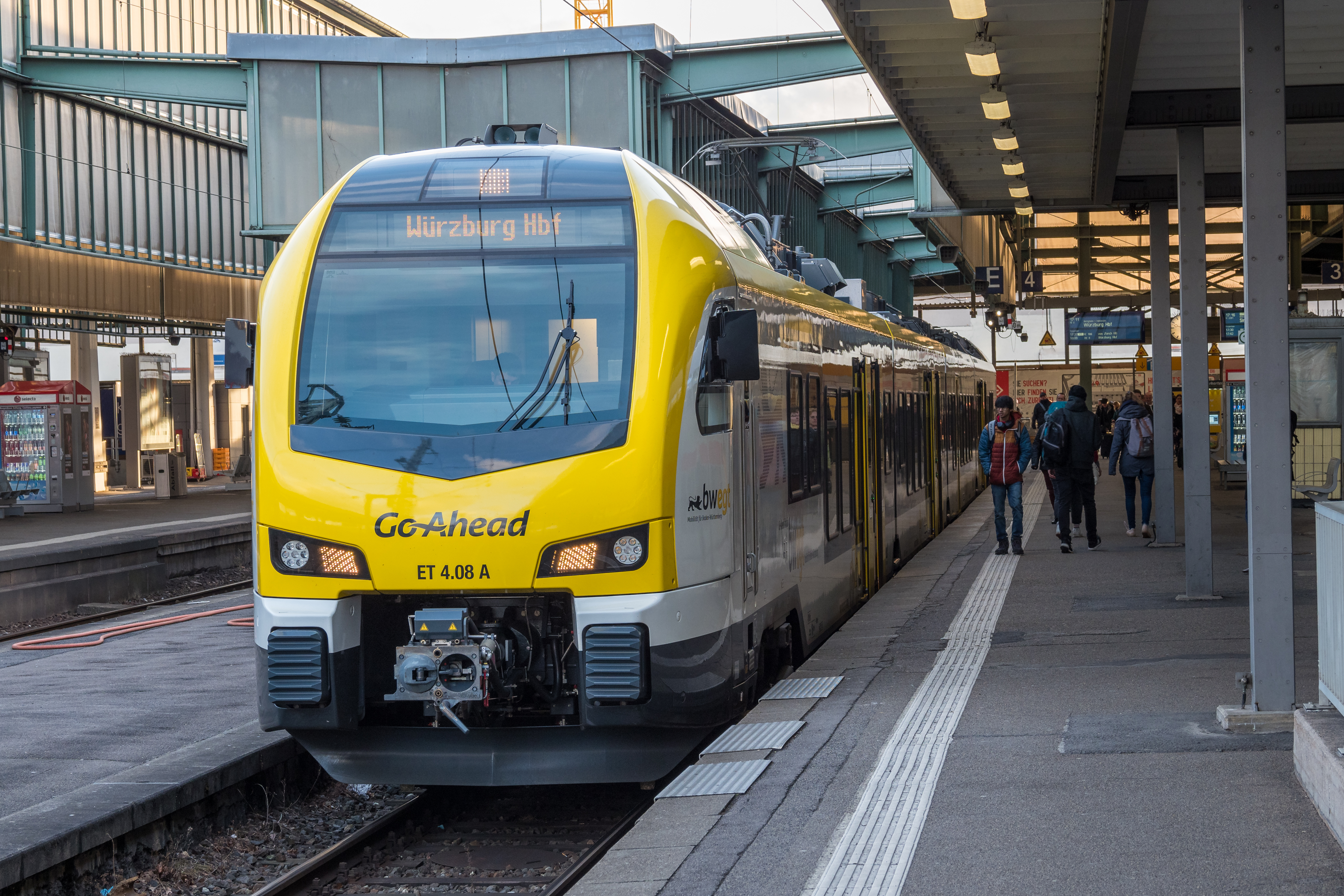
GoAhead ET 4.08 (Stadler Flirt 3) at Stuttgart Hbf

To commence operations, Go-Ahead Deutschland placed an initial order for 45 newly built Stadler Flirt electric multiple-units (EMUs) in May 2016. These trains are equipped with various amenities for the travelling public, including onboard free WiFi, fully accessible carriages, and flexible areas for people travelling with bikes or wheelchairs. 28 Flirts have been stabled at a newly built depot in Essingen.

In January 2019, in order to fulfil additional contracts, Go-Ahead ordered an additional 56 Siemens-built double-decker EMUs. Each set can provide up to 1,000 seats and are furnished with modern accessibility-friendly interiors. Their introduction in December 2022 provided a significant increase in seating capacity on heavily trafficked commuter routes.

In December 2020, it was announced that Go-Ahead Deutschland has selected the TMH International subsidiary of Transmashholding to maintain both EMU fleets operated by the company in southern Bavaria and Baden-Württemberg. As a result of the 2022 Russian invasion of Ukraine, Euco Rail acquired all assets of TMHI in Germany.
