= Lorch (Württ) station =

Railway station in the municipality of Lorch (Württemberg),

Lorch (Württ)
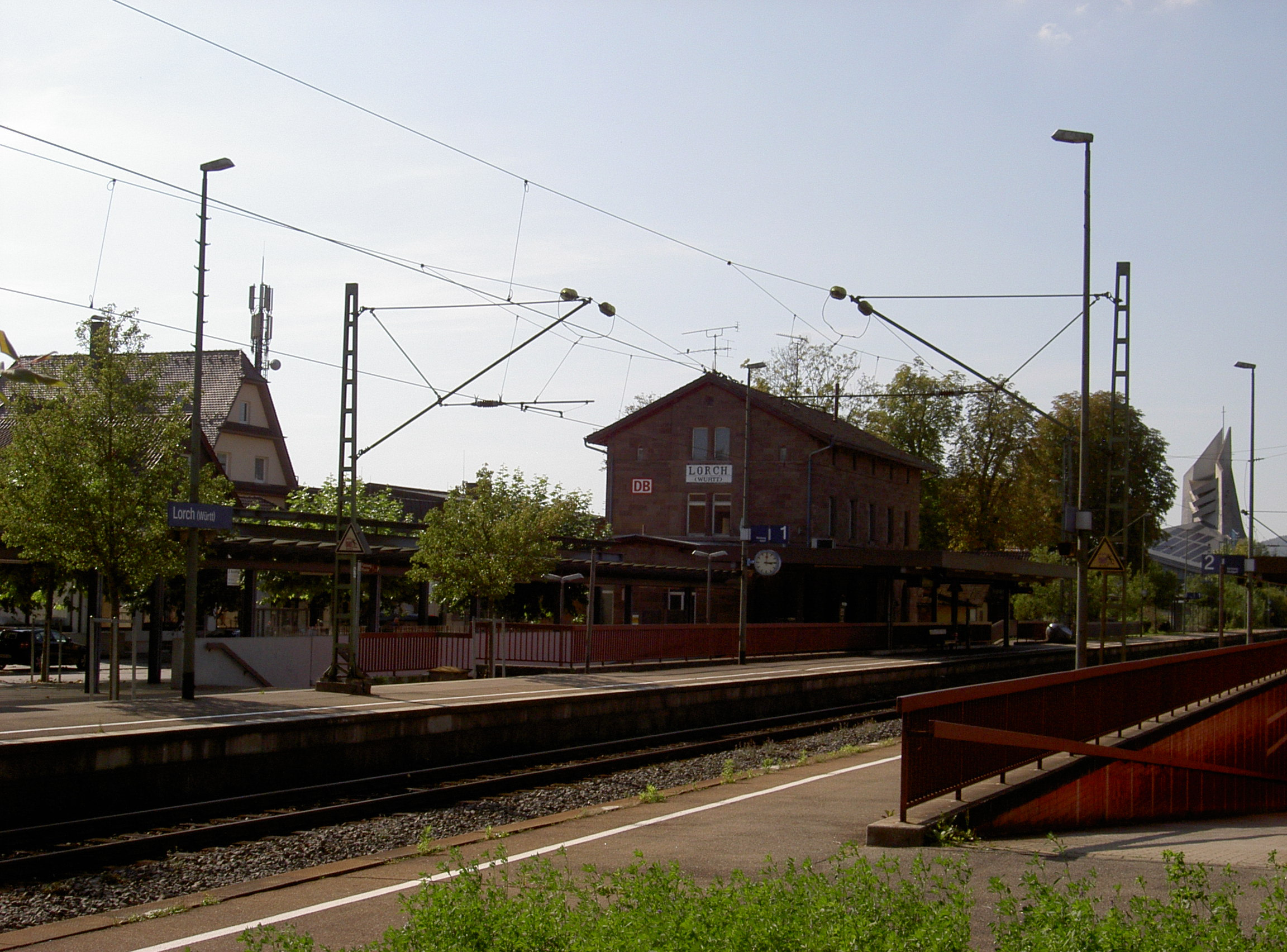

General information
- Location: Poststraße 11; 73547 Lorch; Baden-Württemberg; Germany
- Coordinates: 48°47′52″N 09°41′43″E
- Elevation: 291 m (955 ft)
- System: Bf
- Owner: DB Netz
- Operator: DB Station&Service
- Lines: Rems Railway (KBS 786)
- Platforms: 2 side platforms
- Tracks: 2
- Train operators: Go-Ahead Baden-Württemberg
- Connections: Bus interchange

Construction
- Parking: yes
- Cycle facilities: yes
- Accessible: yes

Other information
- Station code: 3781
- DS100 code: TLO
- IBNR: 8003752
- Category: 5
- Fare zone: OAM: 2116
- Website: www.bahnhof.de

History
- Opened: 25 July 1861

Services
| Preceding station | | Following station |
|---|---|---|
| Waldhausen (b Schorndorf) towards Stuttgart Hbf | MEX 13 | Schwäbisch Gmünd towards Crailsheim |
Location
- Location within Baden-Württemberg Location within Germany Location within Europe

Lorch (Württ) station is a railway station in the municipality of Lorch, located in the Ostalbkreis district in Baden-Württemberg, Germany. The station lies on the Rems Railway. Train services are operated by Go-Ahead Baden-Württemberg.

== History ==
=== Planning and construction ===
The citizens of Lorch received the news with enthusiasm that the Royal Württemberg State Railways wanted to build a rail line from Cannstatt to Wasseralfingen. But this brought difficulties for the market town. Here, the valley of the Rems was particularly densely built-up, so that the line was routed right through the middle of the town. Even buildings had to give way - including the post office building and the Gipfel inn. The State Railways set up four crossings: at Stuttgarter Strasse, Haldenbergstrasse, Friedrichstrasse and Karlsplatz.

In order to avoid obstructing train traffic during floods, the Aimersbach stream was straightened.

The State Railways equipped the station with a two-storey station building made of sandstone. It also housed the post office. To the east of it stood a freight shed. The railway facility had one through track, one crossing track and one timber loading track. Another track led to the freight shed.

=== Opening and boost for the city of Lorch ===
On 25 July 1861 the State Railways opened the Remsthalbahn and Lorch experienced its hoped-for boom. On 22 June 1865 King Karl I granted the municipality town rights. The young town, which made a name for itself as a climatic health resort in the 19th century, welcomed many guests and excursionists with the new means of transport. From 16 May 1876 a stagecoach carried travellers via Pfahlbronn to Welzheim and back. The post office later extended the line to Murrhardt.

As the first industrial enterprise, the pasta factory of the Daiber Brothers started production with three workers in 1876. In 1890, the metalworking factory of the Zeitter Brothers was added. Soon Lorch had also outstripped the seat of the Oberamt Welzheim in terms of population and took the position of the largest town in the district.

=== Expansion of the station ===
On 23 October 1891 the post office left the station building and moved into the former Oberamtsgebäude (today's town hall) in the centre of town. The state railway had a one-storey extension added to the reception building to the east.

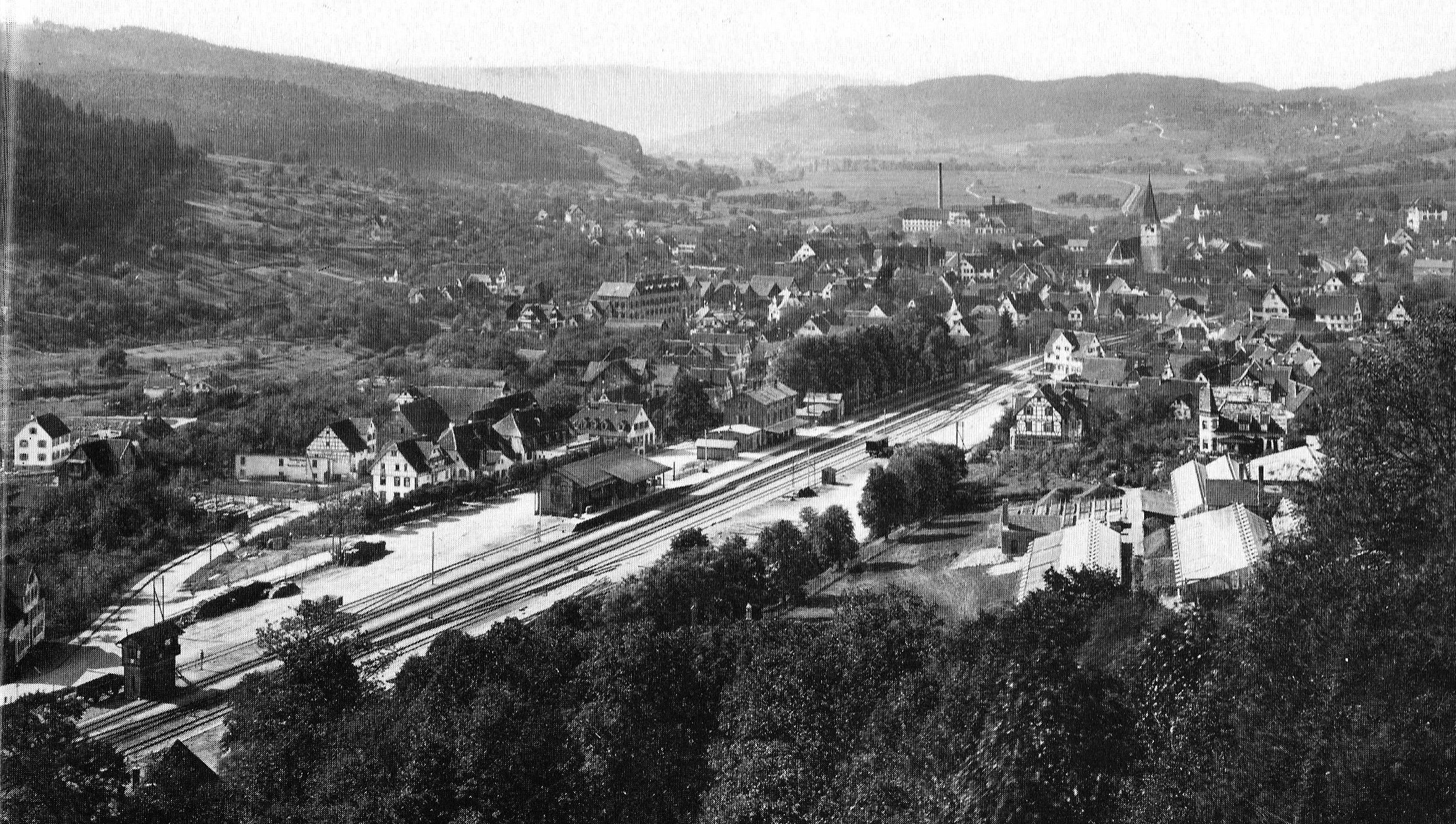
Lorch station around 1895

For better distinction, the station later received the designation Lorch (Württ). A rarity is that the state railway itself added the new name suffix (WÜRTT) to the inscription LORCH, carved into the sandstone, on the gable end of the reception building. Letters and signs were painted in black; the areas around them were painted white.

On 22 October 1902 the state railway completed the double-track expansion between Schorndorf and Lorch. The expansion of the railway system also took place at the same time. The Staatsbahn put a new timber loading station and two signal boxes into operation. A water station was added to relieve the Gmünd station.

Since 1904, a road bridge, the Gipfelbrücke, spanned the tracks to the east of the station. With a span of 20 metres, this reinforced concrete bridge was the largest bridge of its kind in the Kingdom of Württemberg to date.

=== Electrification, modernization and dismantling ===
From 1970, the station underwent modernization. For the imminent electrification, the old summit bridge had to be replaced by a new one. The German Federal Railway closed all level crossings and began electric operation between Schorndorf and Aalen on 26 September 1971.

In the 1980s and 1990s, it equipped the station with an underpass, which opened on 31 October 1987, and reduced the size of the railway facilities to two through tracks and a freight track (now also dismantled) during reconstruction.

After the demolition of the freight shed, the municipality had car parks built in its place.

Ticket sales through an agency located in the station were discontinued on 30 June 2015.
