= Wasseralfingen station =

Railway station in Baden-Württemberg, Germany

Wasseralfingen
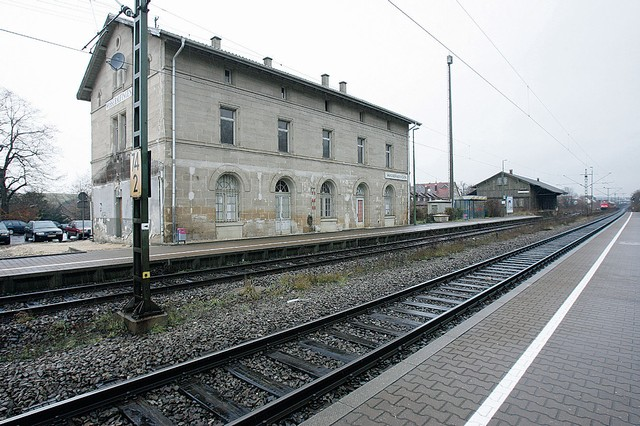

General information
- Location: Schlegelstraße; 73433 Aalen; Baden-Württemberg; Germany
- Coordinates: 48°51′31″N 10°06′12″E
- Elevation: 430 m (1,410 ft)
- System: Hst
- Owner: DB Netz
- Operator: DB Station&Service
- Lines: Stuttgart–Nördlingen (KBS 995)
- Platforms: 2 side platforms
- Tracks: 2
- Train operators: Go-Ahead Baden-Württemberg; Go-Ahead Bayern
- Connections: Bus interchange

Construction
- Parking: yes
- Accessible: yes

Other information
- Station code: 6556
- DS100 code: TWA
- IBNR: 8006217
- Category: 6
- Fare zone: OAM: 1002
- Website: www.bahnhof.de

Services
Preceding station		Following station
Aalen Hbf towards Stuttgart Hbf	MEX 13	Hofen (b Aalen) towards Crailsheim
Preceding station		Following station
Aalen Hbf Terminus	RB 89	Goldshöfe towards Donauwörth
Aalen Hbf Terminus	RE 89	Goldshöfe towards München Hbf
Location
- Location within Baden-Württemberg Location within Germany Location within Europe

Wasseralfingen station is a railway station on the Stuttgart-Bad Cannstatt–Nördlingen railway in the city of Aalen, located in the Ostalbkreis district in Baden-Württemberg, Germany. The train services are operated by Go-Ahead Baden-Württemberg and Go-Ahead Bayern.

The local ironworks, in operation since 1671, had been one of the primary reasons to build the first railway in the region. The Aalen–Wasseralfingen section of the Stuttgart-Bad Cannstatt–Aalen railway was opened in 1861. The extension to Nördlingen followed in 1863. The ironworks still exists as a company (SHW), but are now mostly an automotive supplier and do not use the railway any more.
