= Schwabsberg station =

Railway station in Baden-Württemberg, Germany

Schwabsberg
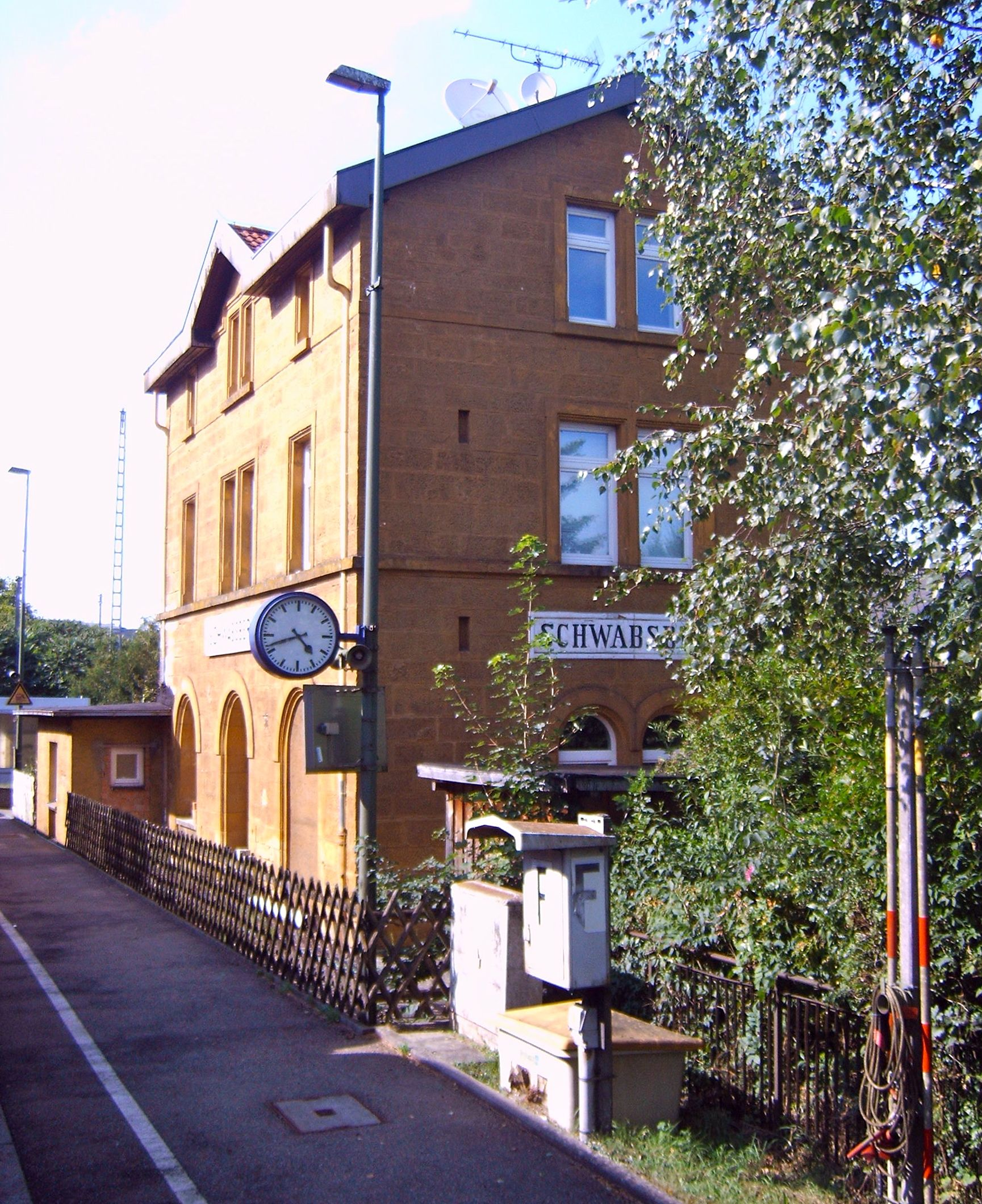

General information
- Location: Am Bahnhof 1; 73492 Rainau; Baden-Württemberg; Germany
- Coordinates: 48°55′30″N 10°08′21″E
- Elevation: 456 m (1,496 ft)
- System: Hp
- Owner: DB Netz
- Operator: DB Station&Service
- Lines: Upper Jagst Railway (KBS 786)
- Platforms: 1 side platform
- Tracks: 1
- Train operators: Go-Ahead Baden-Württemberg
- Connections: Bus interchange

Construction
- Parking: yes
- Accessible: yes

Other information
- Station code: 5703
- DS100 code: TSWA
- IBNR: 8005445
- Category: 7
- Fare zone: OAM: 1753
- Website: www.bahnhof.de

Services
Preceding station		Following station
Goldshöfe towards Stuttgart Hbf	MEX 13	Schrezheim towards Crailsheim
Location
- Location within Baden-Württemberg Location within Germany Location within Europe

Schwabsberg station is a railway stop on the Upper Jagst Railway in the municipality of Rainau, located in the Ostalbkreis district in Baden-Württemberg, Germany.
