= Schwäbisch Gmünd station =

Railway station in Schwäbisch Gmünd, Germany

Schwäbisch Gmünd
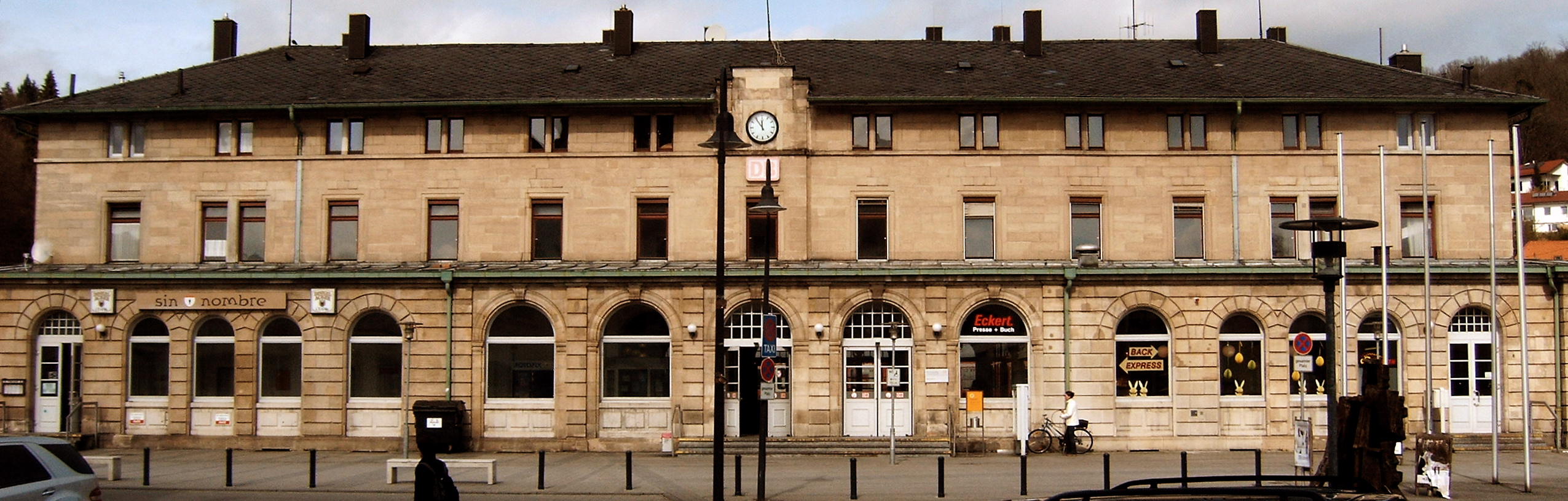

General information
- Location: Schwäbisch Gmünd, Baden-Württemberg; Germany
- Coordinates: 48°48′04″N 9°47′18″E
- Elevation: 319 m (1,047 ft)
- Owner: Deutsche Bahn
- Operator: DB Station&Service
- Lines: Stuttgart–Nördlingen (KBS 786); Hohenstaufen Railway
- Platforms: 3
- Train operators: DB Fernverkehr; Go-Ahead Baden-Württemberg

Construction
- Accessible: Yes
- Architect: Georg Morlok
- Architectural style: Neoclassical

Other information
- Station code: 5699
- DS100 code: TSG
- IBNR: 8000329
- Category: 4
- Fare zone: OAM: 2000
- Website: www.bahnhof.de

History
- Opened: 25 July 1861

Services
Preceding station	DB Fernverkehr	Following station
Stuttgart Hbf towards Karlsruhe Hbf	IC 61	Aalen Hbf towards Nürnberg Hbf or Leipzig Hbf
Preceding station		Following station
Schorndorf towards Karlsruhe Hbf	RE 1	Aalen Hbf Terminus
Lorch (Württ) towards Stuttgart Hbf	MEX 13	Böbingen (Rems) towards Crailsheim
Location

Schwäbisch Gmünd station was opened in 1861 and is located northwest of the city centre of Schwäbisch Gmünd in the German state of Baden-Württemberg. It is on the Stuttgart-Bad Cannstatt–Nördlingen railway and is a stop for InterCity trains.

== History ==
Options in 1858

Three options were discussed in 1858 for the route of the Rems Railway through the city and the location of the station:

- south of the city
- north of the city, but south of the Rems
- north of the Rems

The first options would have meant passing through parks or the built-up area and the future expansion of the city would have been affected. It was decided that the line would run north of the Rems, which meant that the station would be away from the city centre. It also required the relocation of the Rems river, which would protect the city against flooding.

Responsibility for the design of the station building was assigned in Württemberg in the 1850s and 1860s to the chief engineer responsible for the construction of the rail track, which in the case of Rems Railway was Georg Morlok. The construction followed the neoclassical style of station architecture already in use in Württemberg. The small central bell-tower and the pilasters between the arches on the ground floor are typical of Morlok buildings of this era.

=== Opening ===
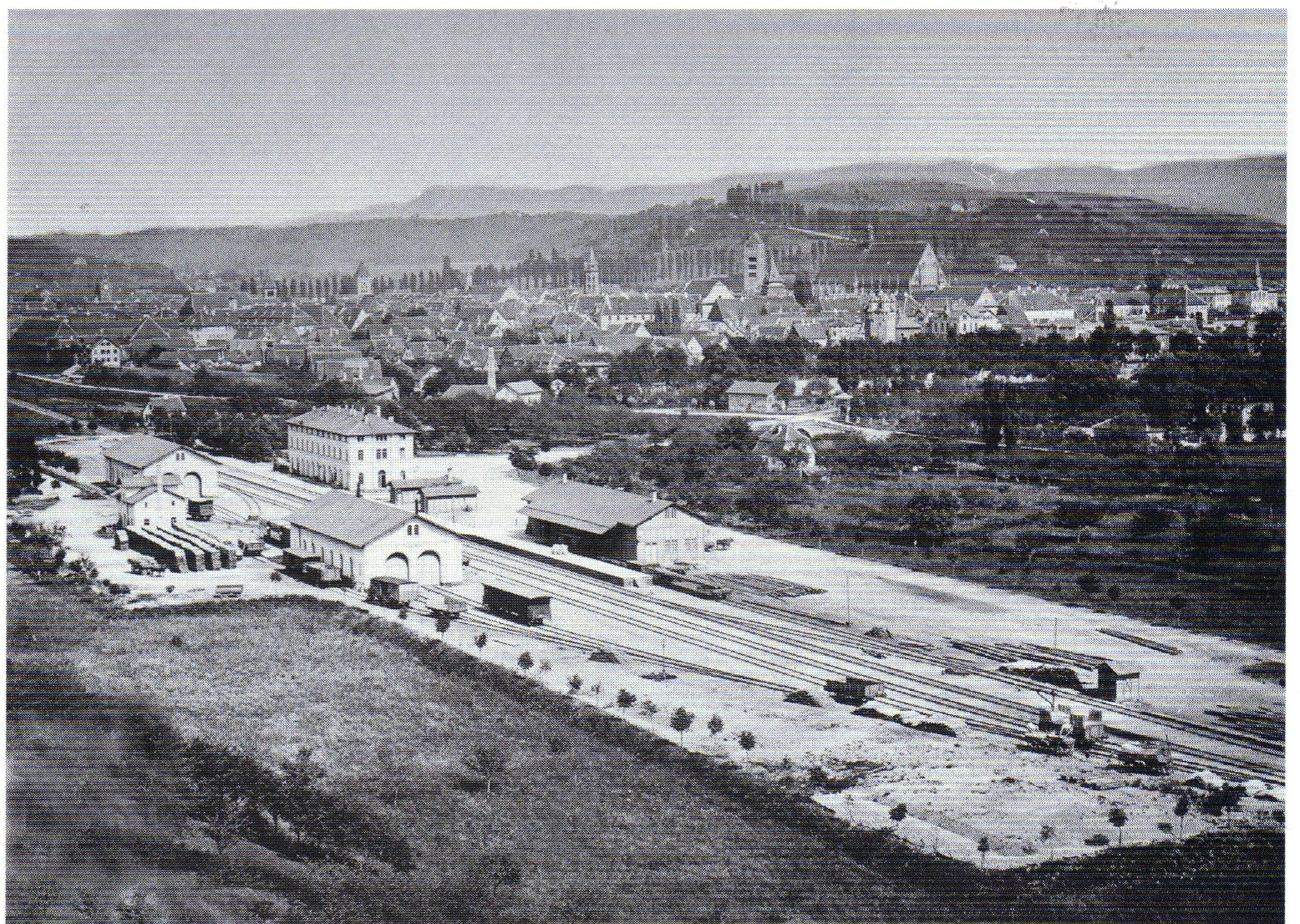
Station in 1868

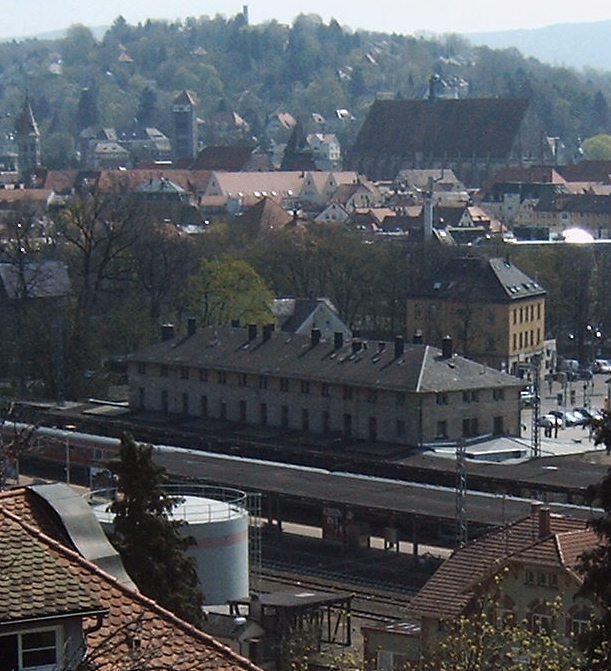
Station and town in 2006

The first official trial run on the Schorndorf–Gmünd section of the Rems line was held on 29 June 1861 in a festive atmosphere with great general interest. An official opening trip with guests of honour was held on 18 July 1861 and on 25 July scheduled services began between Stuttgart and Wasseralfingen. The station tracks initially included 25 sets of points, a turntable and a water station with two water cranes. A ticket from Gmünd to Stuttgart cost, in second class, 81 kreuzers and, in third class, 51 kreuzers.

=== Reconstruction in 1907 ===
The station was reconstructed between 16 September 1907 and 1910 to handle increasing traffic and the proposed branch line to Göppingen, the Hohenstaufen Railway. This involved the building of an island platform with an underpass leading to it. A level crossing east of the station was replaced by an underpass. Two stub tracks and a turntable were built for the Hohenstaufen Railway south of the main tracks on the western side of the station building, where there had previously been a goods shed. North of the main tracks, two locomotive sheds were demolished in order to build the new freight yard. The second track of Rems line was being extended from Deinbach block post to Gmünd and this was put into operation on 27 April 1910. After the redevelopment the station tracks had 116 sets of points and two turntables. It became one of the 24 “first class” stations in Württemberg. The Gmünd–Wäschenbeuren section of the Hohenstaufen line was opened on 1 August 1911.

In 1923 an eastern industrial track was created, running from the freight yard to an industrial area north of the Rems Railway, which from 1937 included a subsidiary of Zahnradfabrik Friedrichshafen in Ziegelberg. In 1936, the western industrial track was built south of the main line.

=== Second World War ===
As part of Second World War in late 1944 bomb attacks and gun fire from allied fighter-bombers repeatedly killed and injured people in the station and on the surrounding railway lines and disabled rail services by the destruction of railway track and vehicles. A bomb explosion on 19 April 1945 destroyed a railway bridge to the west of the station and broke the connection on the Rems Railway to Stuttgart.

=== Post-war period ===
North of the passenger station the freight yard was served by approximately 14,900 freight wagons in 1959. It was closed and demolished.

As part of the horticultural show of 2014 in Schwäbisch Gmünd, the station and the surrounding area have been redesigned.

== Services ==
The station has two platforms, connected by an underpass. The underpass was equipped with lifts in 2014.

Through track 1 is located next to the station; through track 2 and through track 4 are located on the island platform; dead-end track 3, coming from the direction of Stuttgart, has no platform and is located at the western end of the island platform

The station building built in 1861 is still used as such. Today the facilities for the public are a ticket office, a kiosk, a snack bar and a restaurant.

== Operations ==
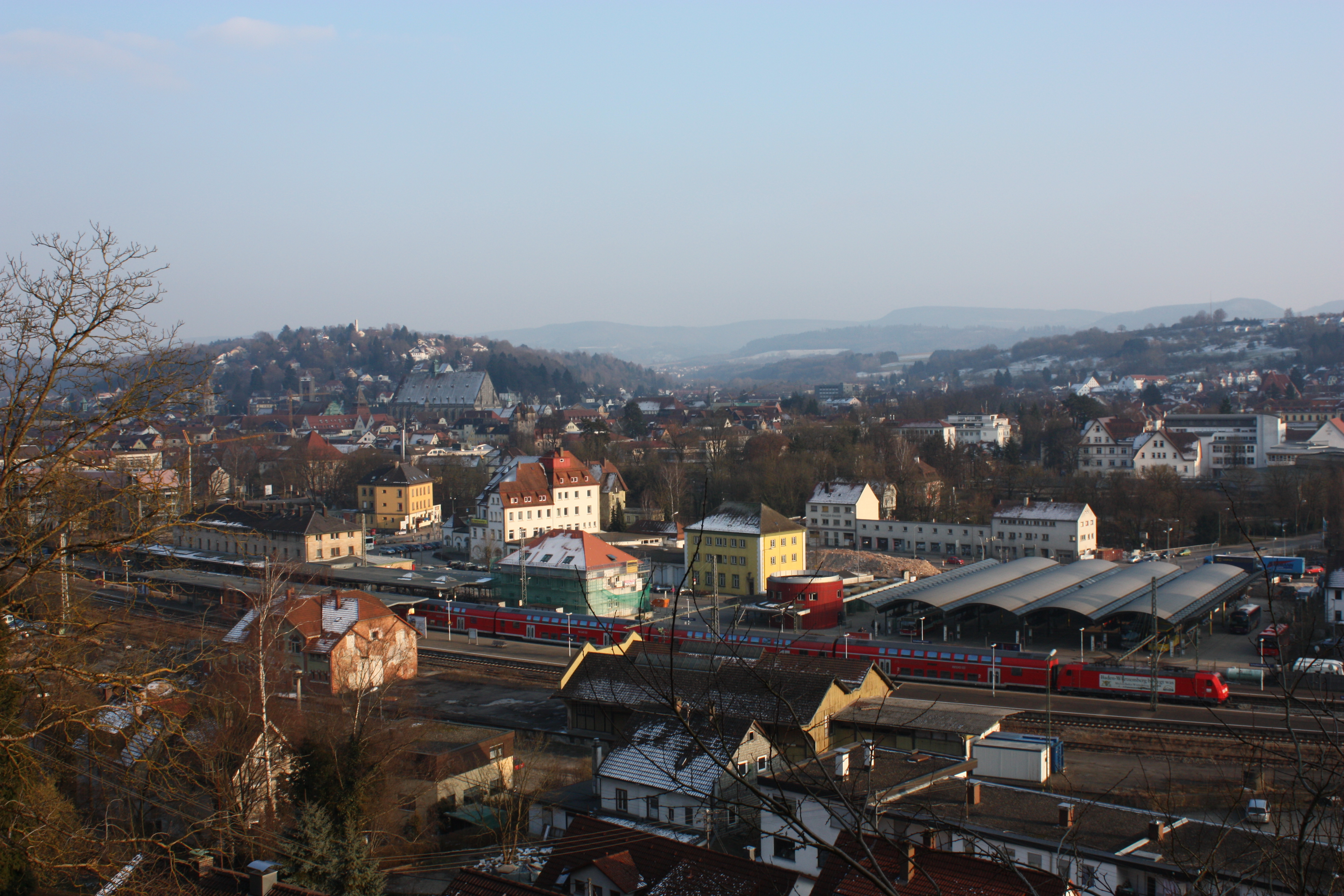
The station in 2011 with RE 19458 service from St. Salvator. In the background demolition is under way for the 2014 horticultural show.

Every two hours inter-city services operated by DB Fernverkehr on the Karlsruhe–Stuttgart–Nuremberg(–Leipzig) route stop at the station. Regional services operated by the DB Regio consist of a pair of Interregio-Express services each day between Aalen and Stuttgart, hourly Regional-Express services on the same route with extra services in peak periods and some Regionalbahn services between Schwäbisch Gmünd and Schorndorf.

Line	Route	Frequency
IC 61	Leipzig – Naumburg – Jena Paradies – Saalfeld – Lichtenfels – Bamberg – Nuremberg – Ansbach – Aalen – Schwäbisch Gmünd – Stuttgart – Karlsruhe	Every 2 hours
RE 1	Stuttgart – Schorndorf – Schwäbisch Gmünd – Aalen	Every 2 hours
MEX 13	Stuttgart – Waiblingen – Schorndorf – Schwäbisch Gmünd – Aalen – Ellwangen – Crailsheim	Every half hour, to Ellwangen every hour, to Crailsheim every two hours

== Connections ==
West of the station building is the city's central bus station, in the forecourt there are a taxi rank, parking spaces and bicycle stands; further east is a park-and-ride car park.
