= Goldshöfe station =

Railway station in Rainau, Germany

Goldshöfe
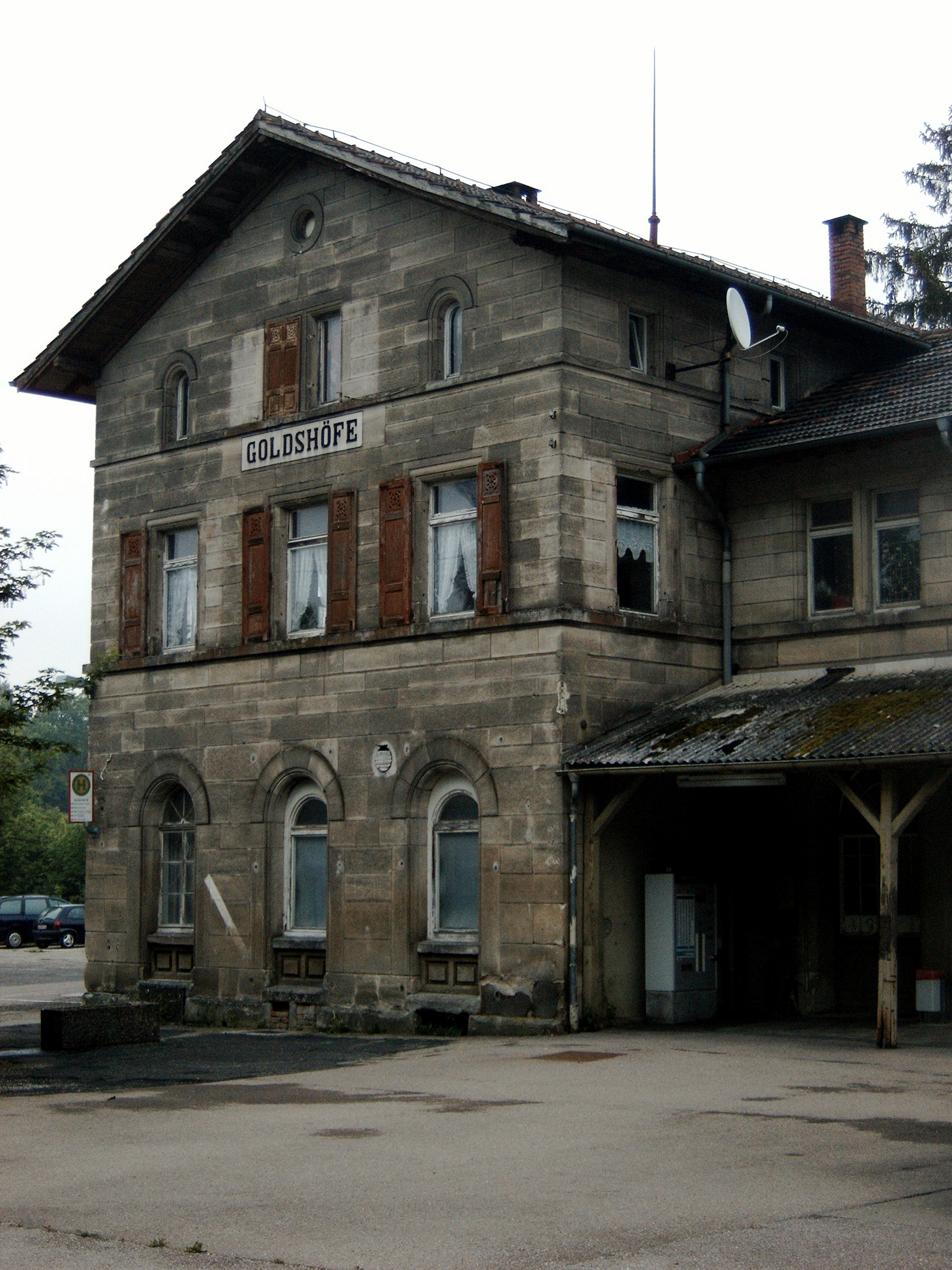
- The Upper Jagst Railway section of the station

General information
- Location: Aalen, Baden-Württemberg; Germany
- Coordinates: 48°53′40″N 10°7′42″E
- Owner: Deutsche Bahn
- Operator: DB Netz; DB Station&Service
- Lines: Goldshöfe–Crailsheim (KBS 786); Stuttgart–Nördlingen (KBS 989)
- Platforms: 3

Construction
- Accessible: 1J: accessible but low 2J: not accessible 2R: accessible

Other information
- Station code: 2175
- DS100 code: TGL
- Category: 5
- Fare zone: OAM: 1084
- Website: www.bahnhof.de

History
- Opened: 3 October 1863

Services
Preceding station		Following station
Wasseralfingen towards Aalen Hbf	RB 89	Westhausen towards Donauwörth
Wasseralfingen towards Aalen Hbf	RE 89	Westhausen towards München Hbf
Preceding station		Following station
Hofen (b Aalen) towards Stuttgart Hbf	MEX 13	Schwabsberg towards Crailsheim
Location

Goldshöfe station is a station in the German state of Baden-Württemberg at the junction of the Goldshöfe–Crailsheim railway and the Stuttgart-Bad Cannstatt–Nördlingen railway. In addition to its function as a junction station it also serves the towns of Hüttlingen and Buch in the municipality of Rainau, both about two kilometres away. The station was named after the nearby farmhouse of Goldshöfe, which today is part of the Aalen district of Hofen.

== History ==
The station was opened on 3 October 1863 with the line to Nördlingen was opened as part of the Rems Railway (Remsbahn). A connection to Crailsheim was being planned at that time and the station was designed from its beginning as a junction station. The line to Crailsheim (the Upper Jagst Railway) went into operation in 1866, which subsequently became the more important of the two lines, as part of the main line between Stuttgart and Nuremberg. Nevertheless, in 1972 the line to Nordlinger was electrified as an alternative route for traffic between Stuttgart and Munich to the line via Ulm for the Olympic Games in Munich. The Crailsheim line was electrified in 1985.

== Infrastructure ==
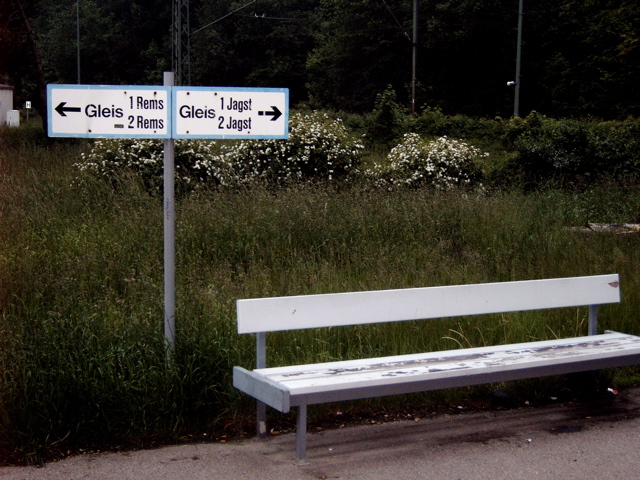
Sign to "Rems" and "Jagst" platforms

The station building, which is T-shaped, is typical of stations built in Württemberg at the time and is built between the two lines that separate the front of the station. Each of the two sections has two platform tracks. Later both the line to Nördlingen and the line to Crailsheim are single-track, while the line from Aalen has two tracks. The platform tracks of both lines are numbered 1 and 2, and are distinguished by the prefix of "Jagst" or "Rems". In the timetable the prefixes are abbreviated to "J" and "R”. The tracks are crossed via planks crossings on the level rather than by subways. The "Rems 1" track is now closed. Until 1985 there was a rail connection from the "Rems" parts of station to the Upper Jagst Railway, which was built when the local freight yard was established.

The goods shed still exists, but in the meantime it has lost its function.

== Operations ==
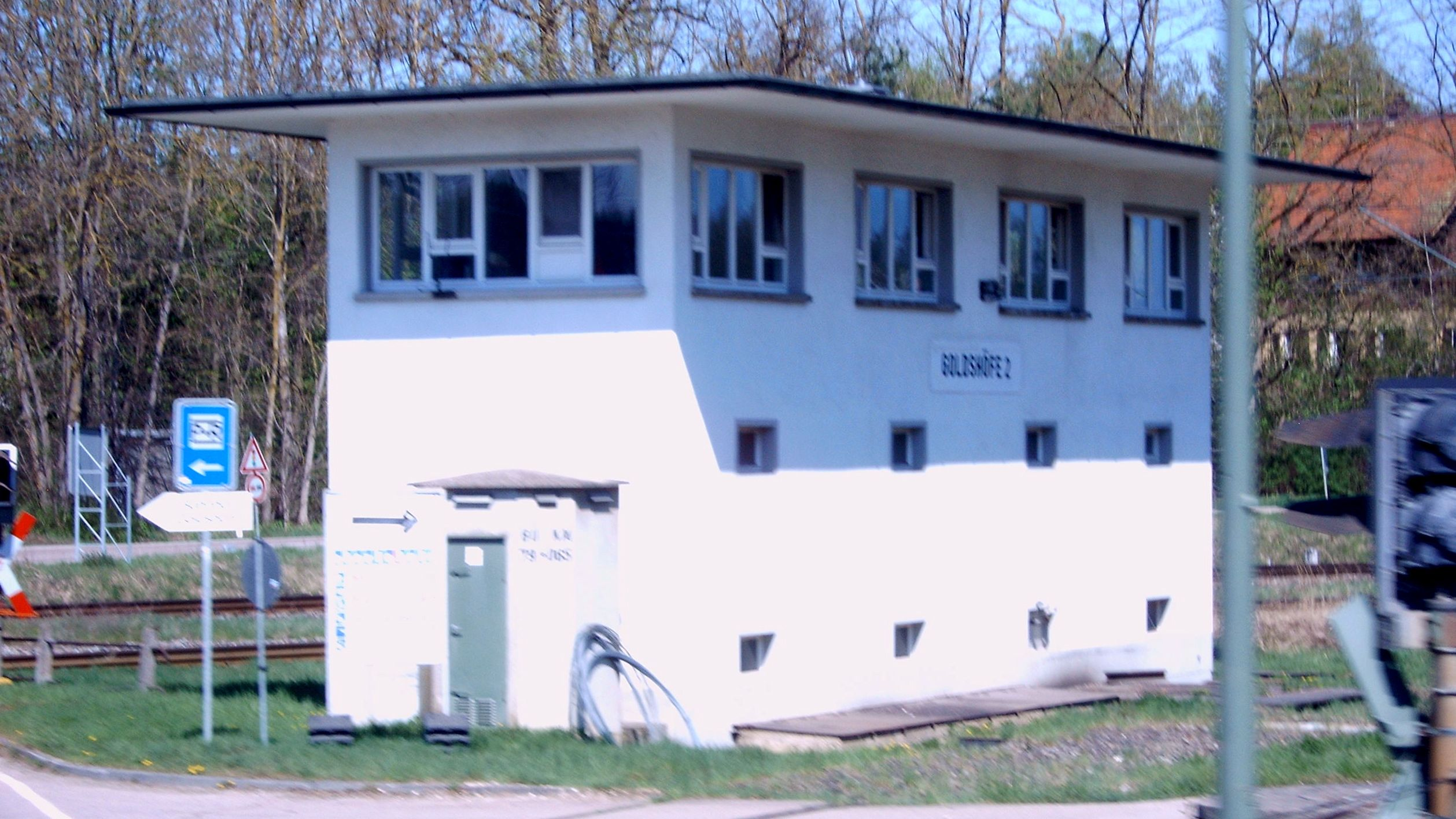
Signal box 2 (east)

The station is classified by Deutsche Bahn as a category 5 station. Its main purpose is as a junction station. It is also used for turning, parking and maintaining trains serving the nearby Aalen station.

Goldshöfe is served by the RB 89 service to Donauwörth and the MEX 13 service to Crailsheim, with the regular interval timetable providing good interchange opportunities. The InterCity services between Karlsruhe and Nuremberg run through without stopping.

The station has a bus stop, a park-and-ride facility and a covered bicycle stand.
