= Schrezheim station =

Railway station in Ellwangen, Ostalbkreis

Schrezheim
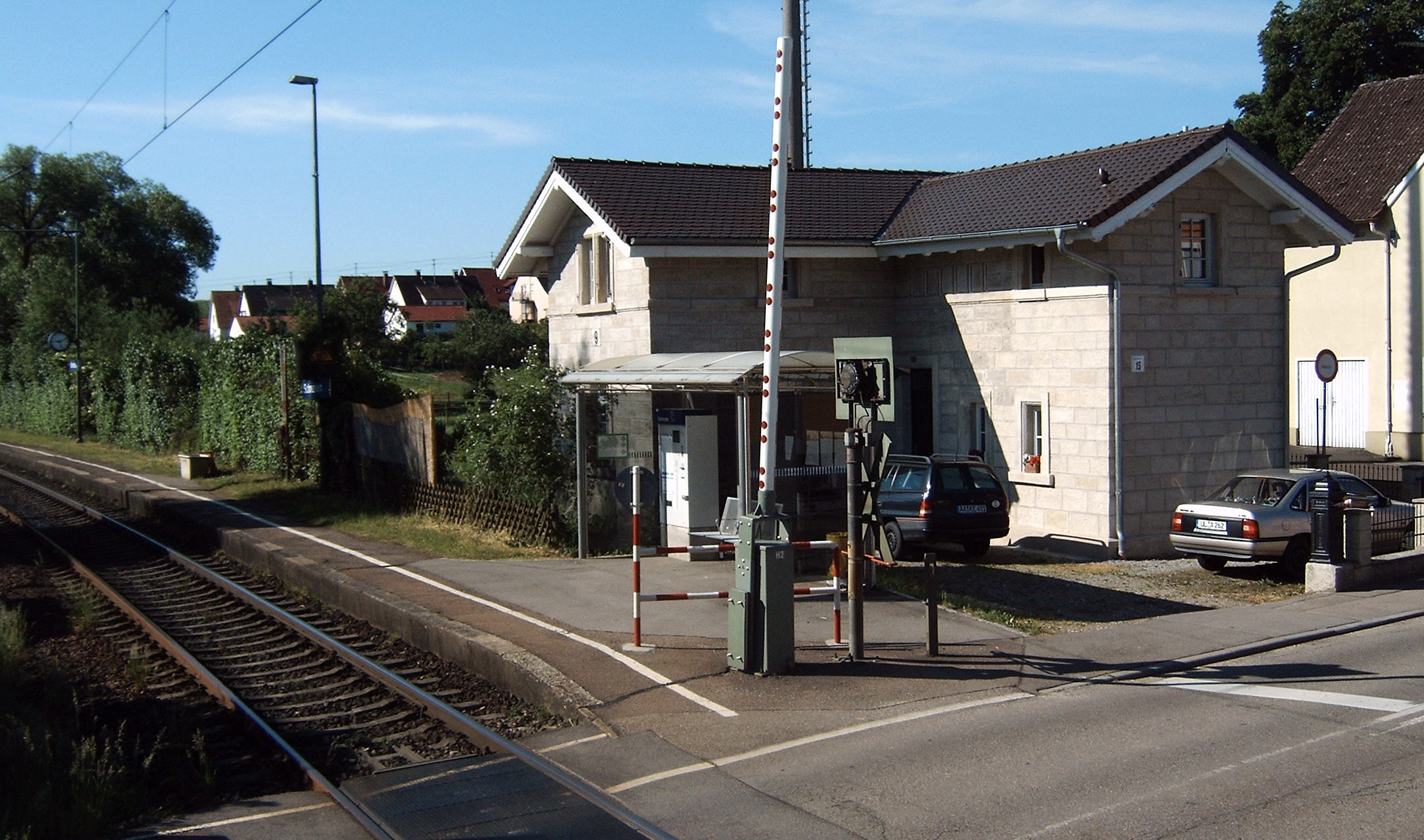

General information
- Location: Fayence-Straße; 73479 Ellwangen; Baden-Württemberg; Germany
- Coordinates: 48°57′06″N 10°07′03″E
- Elevation: 435 m (1,427 ft)
- System: Hp
- Owner: DB Netz
- Operator: DB Station&Service
- Lines: Upper Jagst Railway (KBS 786)
- Platforms: 1 side platform
- Tracks: 1
- Train operators: Go-Ahead Baden-Württemberg
- Connections: Bus interchange

Construction
- Accessible: yes

Other information
- Station code: 5686
- DS100 code: TSCH
- IBNR: 8005431
- Category: 7
- Fare zone: OAM: 1552
- Website: www.bahnhof.de

Services
Preceding station		Following station
Schwabsberg towards Stuttgart Hbf	MEX 13	Ellwangen towards Crailsheim
Location
- Location within Baden-Württemberg Location within Germany Location within Europe

Schrezheim station is a railway stop on the Upper Jagst Railway in the municipality of Ellwangen, located in the Ostalbkreis district in Baden-Württemberg, Germany.
