= Jagstzell station =

Railway station in Germany

Jagstzell
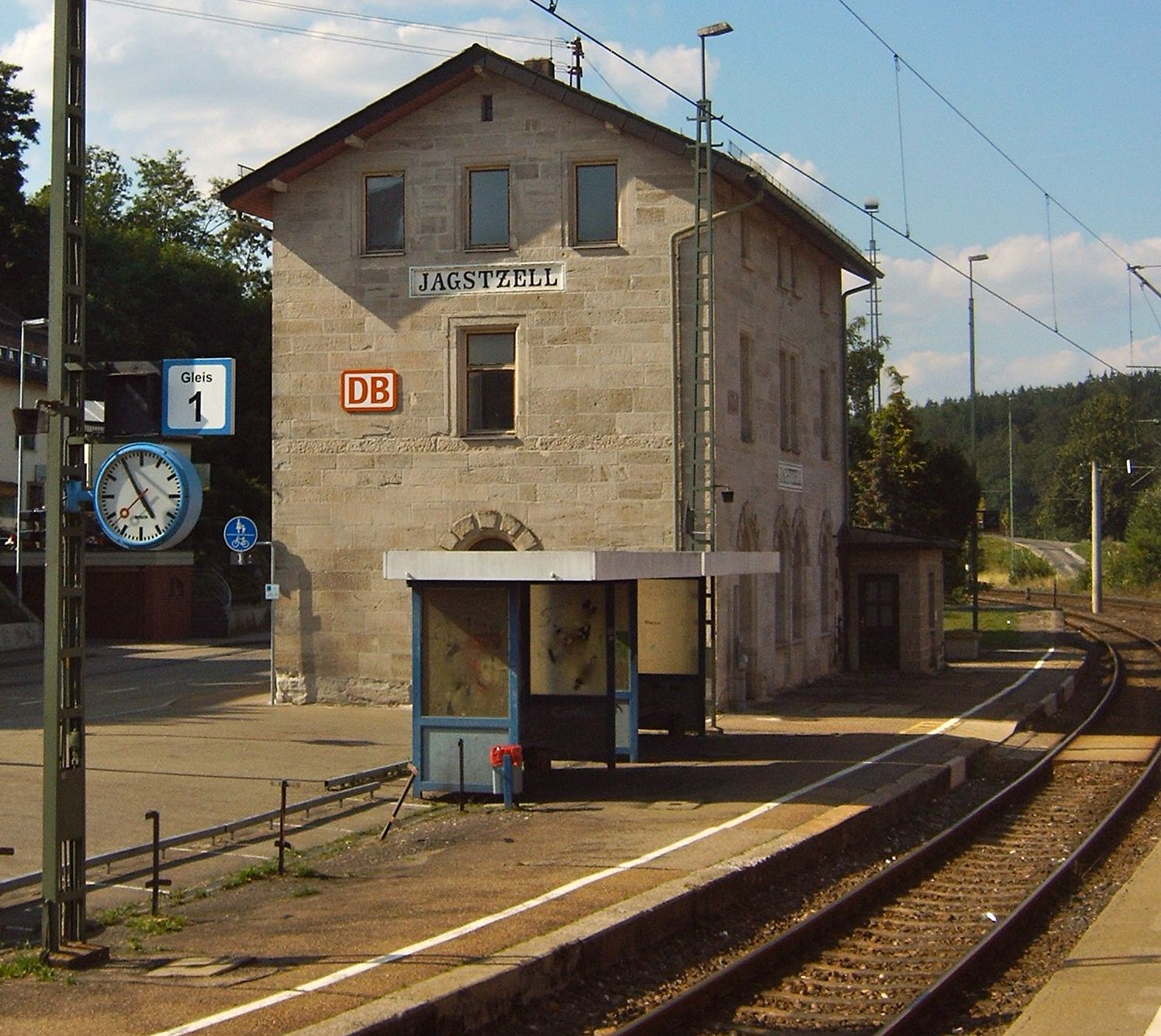
- 2009

General information
- Location: Crailsheimer Straße 4; 73489 Jagstzell; Baden-Württemberg; Germany
- Coordinates: 49.0314°N 10.0986°E
- Elevation: 423 m (1,388 ft)
- System: Bf
- Owner: DB Netz
- Operator: DB Station&Service
- Lines: Upper Jagst Railway (KBS 786)
- Platforms: 2 side platforms
- Tracks: 2
- Train operators: Go-Ahead Baden-Württemberg

Construction
- Parking: yes
- Cycle facilities: yes
- Accessible: yes

Other information
- Station code: 3026
- DS100 code: TJZ
- IBNR: 8003111
- Category: 6
- Fare zone: OAM: 1694; KVSH: 13601 (OAM transitional zone)
- Website: www.bahnhof.de

Services
Preceding station		Following station
Ellwangen towards Stuttgart Hbf	MEX 13	Crailsheim Terminus
Location
- Location within Baden-Württemberg

Jagstzell station is a railway station in the municipality of Jagstzell, located in the Ostalbkreis district in Baden-Württemberg, Germany.
