= Hofen (b Aalen) station =

Rail station in Germany

Hofen (b Aalen)
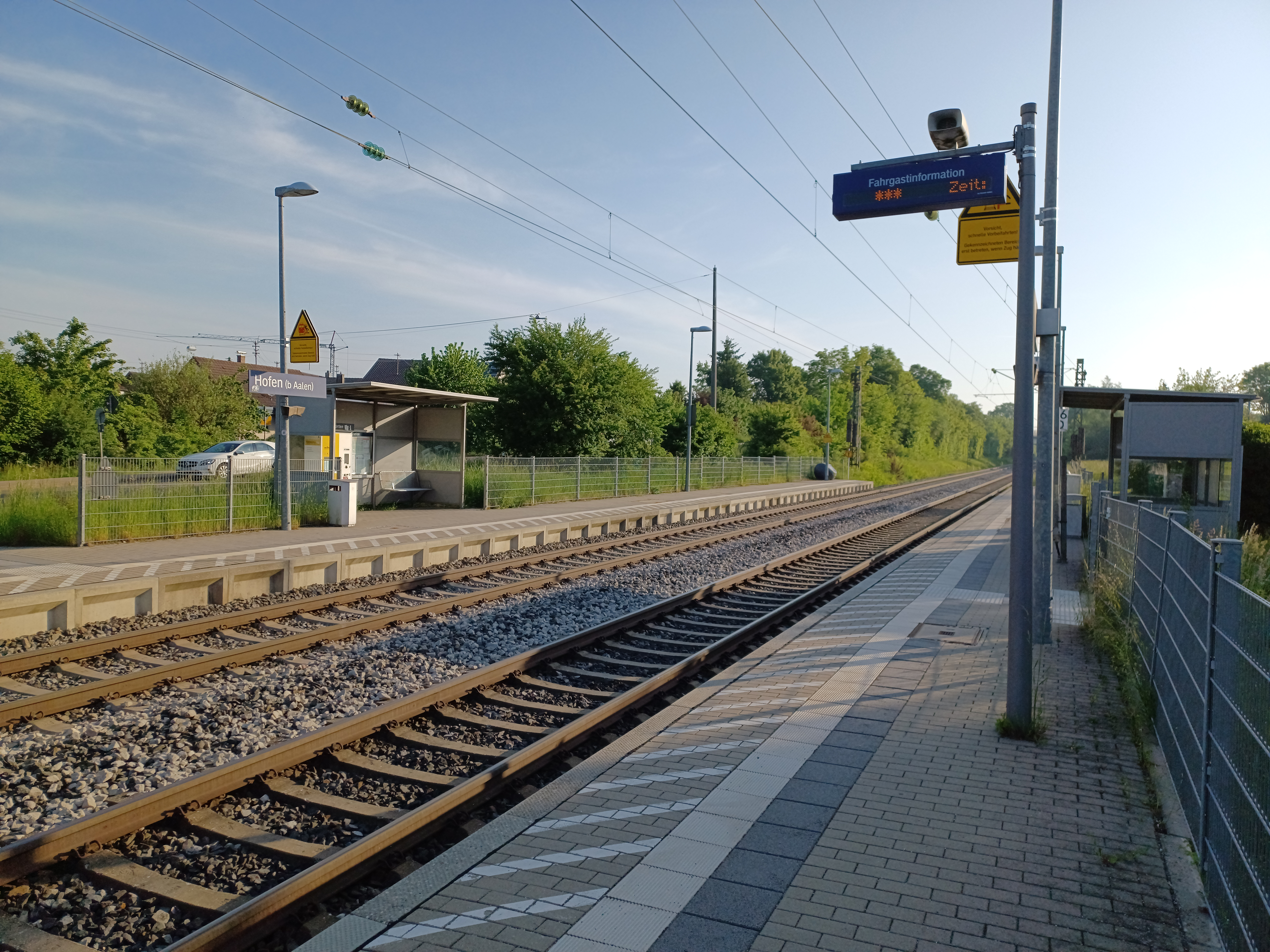

General information
- Location: Ellwanger Straße; 73433 Aalen; Baden-Württemberg; Germany
- Coordinates: 48°52′21″N 10°06′51″E
- Elevation: 440 m (1,440 ft)
- System: Hp
- Owner: DB Netz
- Operator: DB Station&Service
- Lines: Stuttgart–Nördlingen (KBS 995)
- Platforms: 2 side platforms
- Tracks: 2
- Train operators: Go-Ahead Baden-Württemberg
- Connections: Bus interchange

Construction
- Parking: yes
- Cycle facilities: yes

Other information
- Station code: 2821
- DS100 code: THOF
- IBNR: 8002930
- Category: 6
- Fare zone: OAM: 1083
- Website: www.bahnhof.de

Services
Preceding station		Following station
Wasseralfingen towards Stuttgart Hbf	MEX 13	Goldshöfe towards Crailsheim
Location
- Location within Baden-Württemberg Location within Germany Location within Europe

Hofen (b Aalen) station is a railway stop in the city of Aalen, located in the Ostalbkreis district in Baden-Württemberg, Germany. The station lies on the Stuttgart–Nördlingen. The train services are operated by Go-Ahead Baden-Württemberg.
