= Ellwangen station =

Railway station in Ellwangen, Germany

Ellwangen
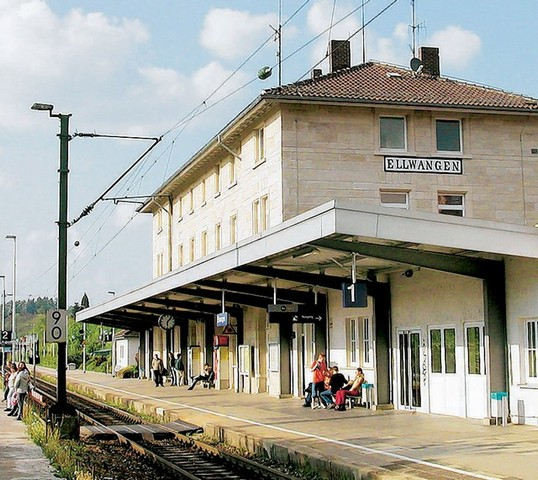
- 2006

General information
- Location: Bahnhofstraße 7; 73479 Ellwangen; Baden-Württemberg; Germany
- Coordinates: 48.9641°N 10.1299°E
- Elevation: 432 m (1,417 ft)
- Owner: DB InfraGO
- Operator: DB InfraGO
- Lines: Upper Jagst Railway (KBS 786)
- Platforms: 3 side platforms
- Tracks: 3
- Train operators: DB Fernverkehr; Arverio Baden-Württemberg

Other information
- Station code: 1554
- DS100 code: TEL
- IBNR: 8001751
- Category: 5
- Fare zone: OAM: 1550
- Website: www.bahnhof.de

Services
Preceding station	DB Fernverkehr	Following station
Aalen Hbf towards Karlsruhe Hbf	IC 61	Crailsheim towards Nürnberg Hbf or Leipzig Hbf
Preceding station		Following station
Schrezheim towards Stuttgart Hbf	MEX 13	Jagstzell towards Crailsheim
Location

Ellwangen station is a railway station in the municipality of Ellwangen, located in the Ostalbkreis district in Baden-Württemberg, Germany.
