= Aalen Hauptbahnhof =

Railway station in Aalen, Germany

Aalen Hbf
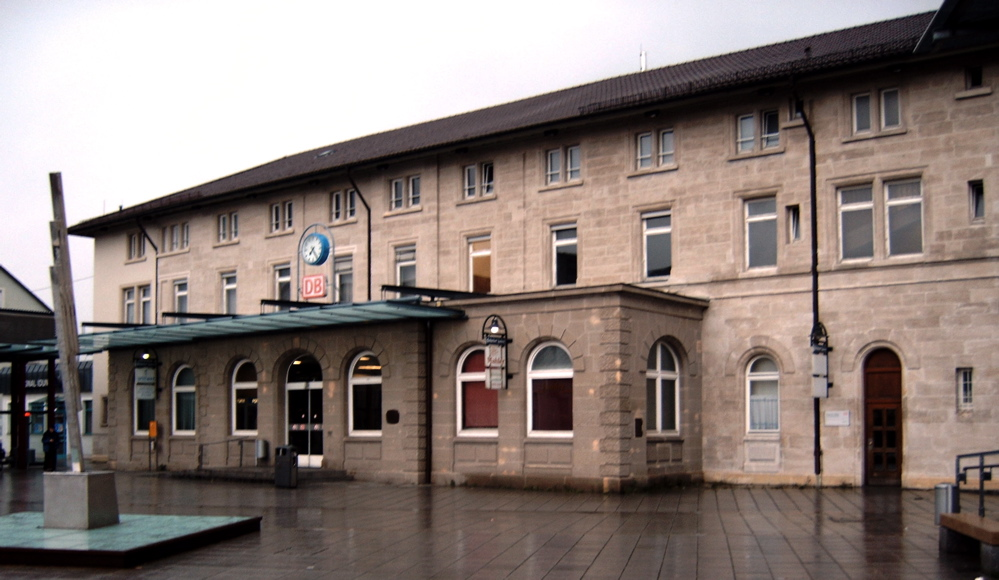
- Station building (2006)

General information
- Location: Am Bahnhof 1, Aalen, Baden-Württemberg; Germany
- Coordinates: 48°50′27″N 10°5′46″E
- Owner: DB Netz
- Operator: DB Station&Service
- Lines: Aalen–Ulm (KBS 757); Stuttgart–Nördlingen (KBS 786, KBS 989); Härtsfeld Railway (until 1972)
- Platforms: 5
- Connections: Bus interchange

Construction
- Accessible: Yes

Other information
- Station code: 4
- DS100 code: TA
- IBNR: 8000002
- Category: 3
- Fare zone: OAM: 1000
- Website: www.bahnhof.de

History
- Opened: 18 July 1861

Passengers
- 9,200

Services
Preceding station	DB Fernverkehr	Following station
Schwäbisch Gmünd towards Karlsruhe Hbf	IC 61	Ellwangen towards Nürnberg Hbf or Leipzig Hbf
Preceding station		Following station
Terminus	RB 89	Wasseralfingen towards Donauwörth
Terminus	RE 89	Wasseralfingen towards München Hbf
Preceding station	DB Regio Baden-Württemberg	Following station
Oberkochen towards Ulm Hbf	RE 50	Terminus
Preceding station		Following station
Schwäbisch Gmünd towards Karlsruhe Hbf	RE 1	Terminus
Mögglingen (Gmünd) towards Stuttgart Hbf	MEX 13	Wasseralfingen towards Crailsheim
Preceding station	(Offenburg)	Following station
Unterkochen towards Ulm Hbf	RS 5	Terminus
Location

Aalen Hauptbahnhof is a junction on the Stuttgart-Bad Cannstatt–Nördlingen railway from Stuttgart to Nördlingen and the Aalen–Ulm railway from Ulm. The station is located 200 metres northeast of the historic old town (Altstadt) of Aalen in the German state of Baden-Württemberg. It is classified by Deutsche Bahn as a category 3 station. Aalen station was renamed a Hauptbahnhof (main station) at the timetable change on 11 December 2016.

== History ==
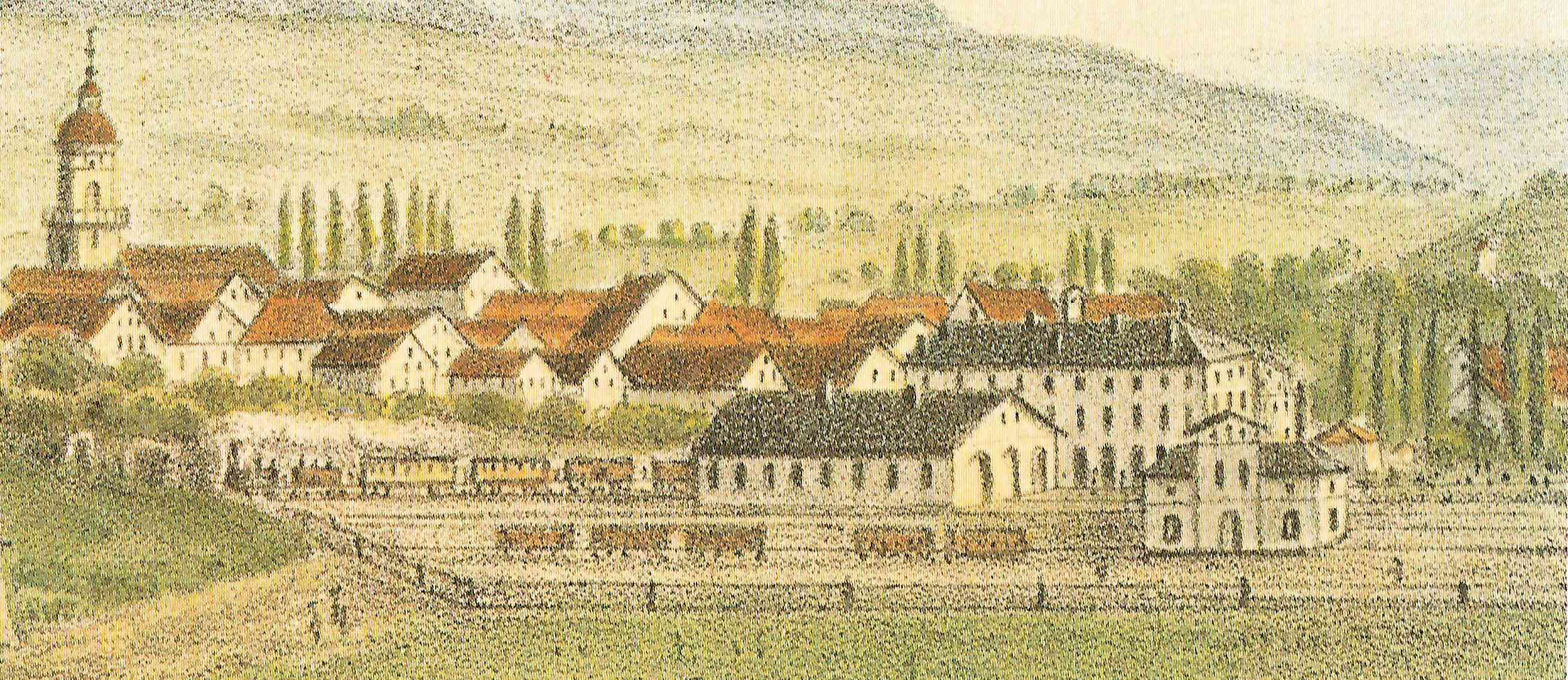
Station and town in 1861

Despite disagreements between the countries of Württemberg and Bavaria, which did not have a common concept of a cross-border railway, the Rems Railway (German: Remsbahn) was opened by the Royal Württemberg State Railways on 18 July 1861. Aalen was not planned as a railway junction and the station at first was small with eight railway employees who also had postal duties. An extension of the railway towards Nördlingen—now considered part of the Ries Railway (Riesbahn)—opened on 3 October 1863. The third connection was achieved on 13 September 1864 with the opening of the Brenz Railway (Brenzbahn) to Heidenheim (the connection from Heidenheim to Ulm was not completed until 1876 because of the so-called Brenzbahn clause of the treaty between Württemberg and Bavaria that authorised construction of the Rems Railway). The Upper Jagst Railway (Oberen Jagstbahn) to Crailsheim was opened on 15 November 1866 and it was connected to Schwäbisch Hall on 10 December 1867 with the extension of the Hohenlohe Railway (Hohenlohebahn). In 1865, a railway repair shop was established in Aalen, which was later the basis for the train depot.

By that time it was becoming apparent that the station was too small for the increasing railway traffic. Its only covered platform was the "main platform" in front of the station building and its second platform was only about 1.8 m wide. Thus the expansion and renovation of the station began in 1873. In 1876 the new main station building was inaugurated. In 1884 the station had four tracks, three of which were used for passenger services. Thus, despite the scarcity of funds (the Württemberg government provided only 500,000 German gold marks of the necessary 3,500,000), the station was prepared for further traffic increases. By the end of the century, traffic grew to a total of 80 trains per day.

In 1901 funds were exhausted, but the state made available an additional 1.4 million gold marks. This allowed the station to be expanded from three to five tracks for passengers. On 31 October of that year the Härtsfeld Railway (Härtsfeldbahn), a 1000-mm narrow-gauge railway to Neresheim and Dillingen, was opened. Its tracks ended opposite the railway station on the other side of the tracks. In order to connect to the station, a 72 m-long (236 ft) tunnel was built under the railway tracks. Since the line at first ran parallel with the line to Ulm, this section had a three-rail track.

In 1905, an electro-mechanical interlocking was installed at the station.

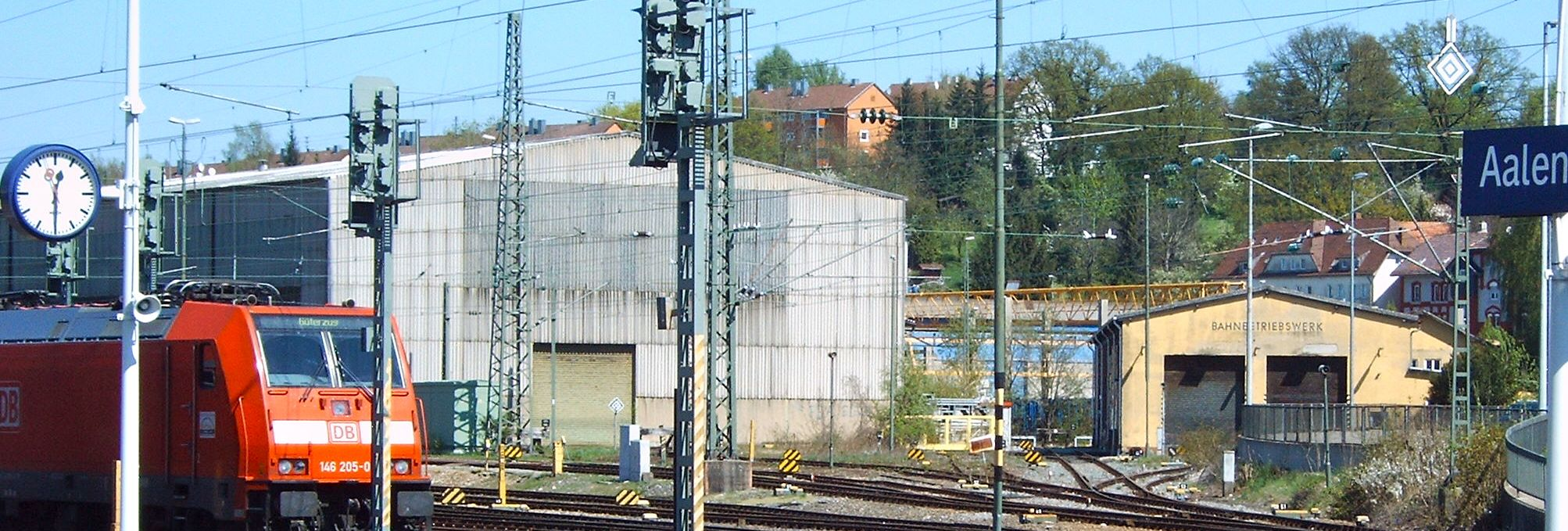
Depot (2009)

During World War II there was a wave of attacks on the station, starting on 1 and 2 April 1945, when it was not very damaged. Only the targeted attacks on 8 and 17 April did lasting damage to the station, causing passenger services to be stopped altogether. Traffic was resumed on 9 July at the request of the Allies.

The next major change took place in 1970 with the beginning of the electrification of the Rems Railway, which was completed on 28 May 1972. Electrification of the section to Crailsheim was completed on 2 June 1985.

The Härtsfeld Railway was closed for passenger services on 30 September 1972. Freight traffic closed two months later on 30 November. This was followed by the dismantling of the railway tracks.

A renovation of the main building, which had been planned in 1980, was deferred to 1990. The reason given was that the building was now under a preservation order. The 4.4 million Deutsche Marks project provided the station with a travel centre, a shop and a bistro.

In January 2010, it was announced that Aalen station would benefit from federal funds from the first economic stimulus package, totalling about €4.8 million, for modernisation and for adapting its access for the disabled. So three lifts are to be installed to connect the platforms and the underpass and the station platform are being raised from 38 to 55 centimetres high. Similarly the station as a whole is also being "rebuilt with modern equipment." Construction work began on 25 February 2011.

== Operations ==
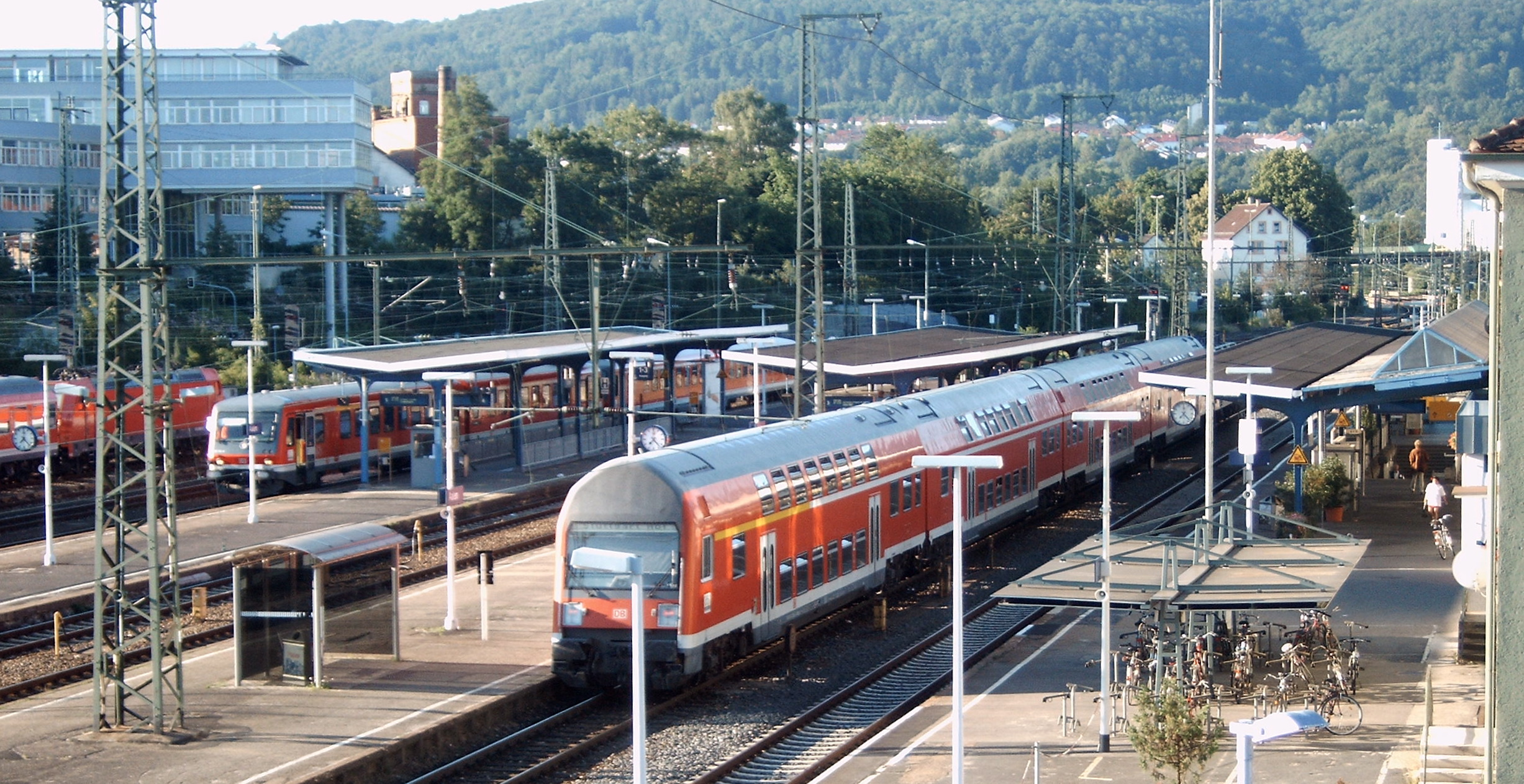
Platforms

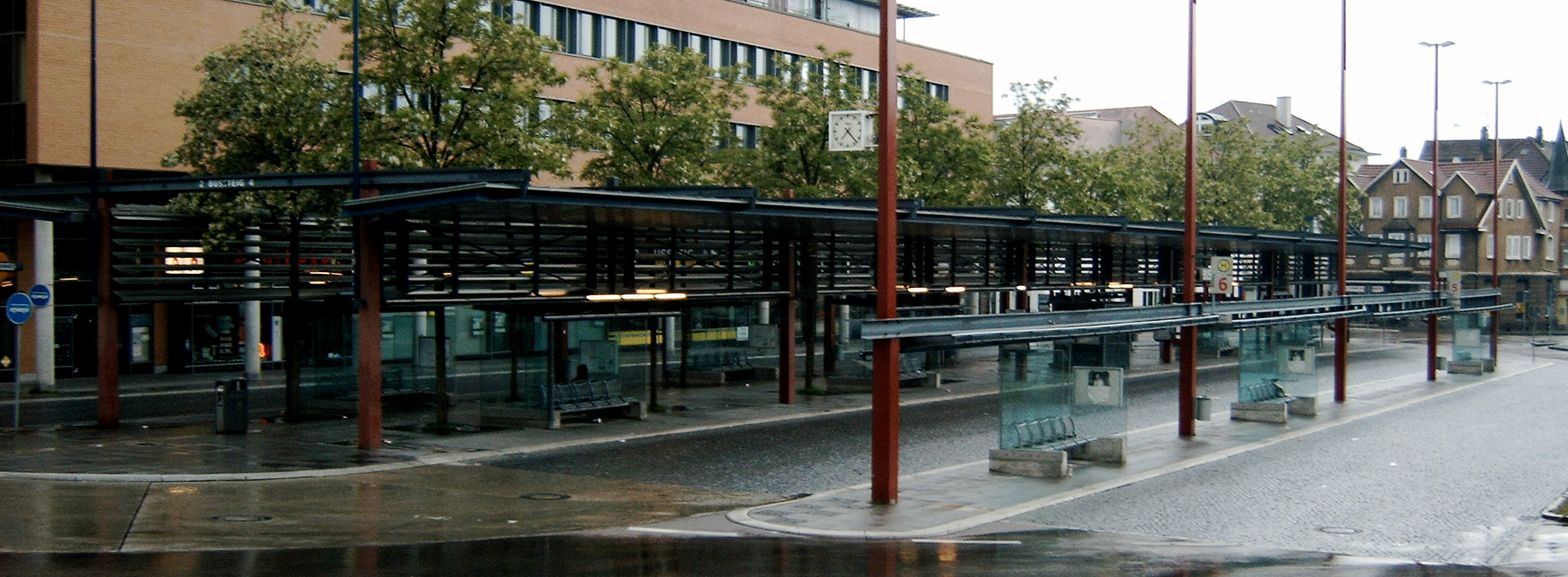
Bus station

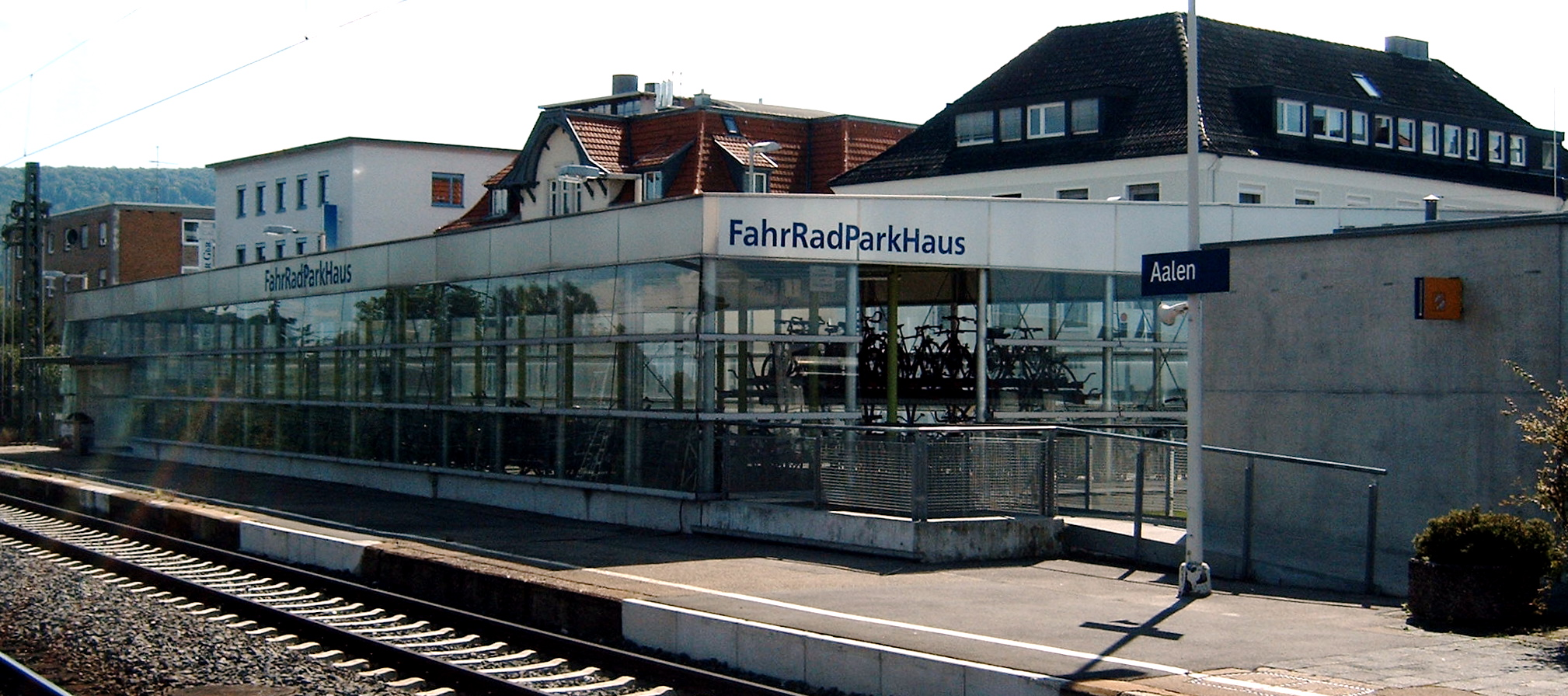
Cycle parking

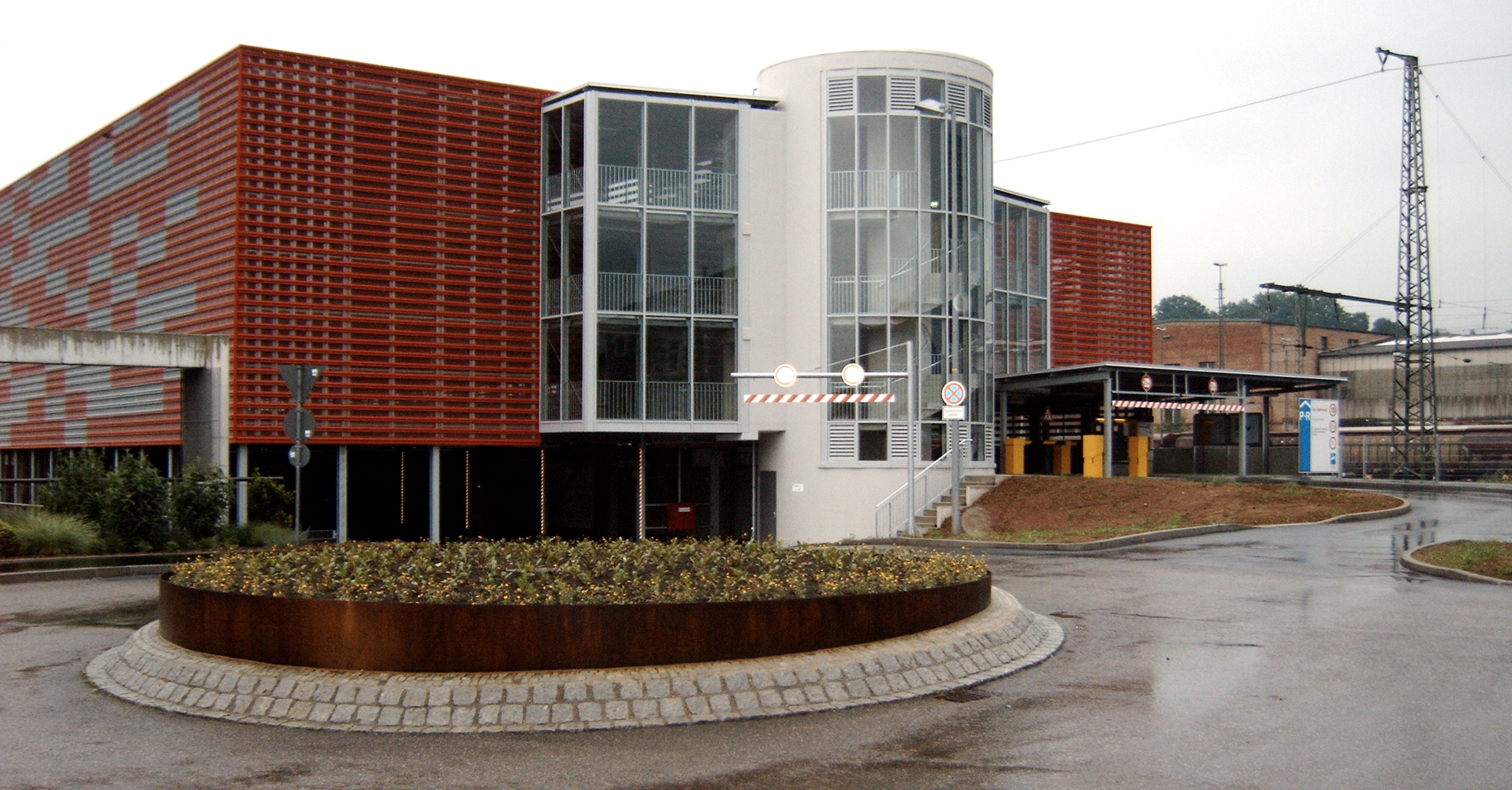
Park and ride parking station

The basic interval timetable of Baden-Württemberg operates at the station. Each hour at about 30 minutes after the hour regional services interchange at the station on the following routes in both directions:

- Stuttgart–Aalen (Stuttgart-Bad Cannstatt–Nördlingen railway)
- Ulm–Aalen–Ellwangen (–Crailsheim, Aalen–Ulm railway and Goldshöfe–Crailsheim railway)
- Aalen–Donauwörth (Stuttgart-Bad Cannstatt–Nördlingen railway and Augsburg–Nördlingen railway)

The interchange between services to and from Ellwangen and Donauwörth is at the nearby Goldshöfe station.

On every odd hour, interchange is possible between Intercity trains on the Karlsruhe–Stuttgart–Nürnberg route in both directions and Interregio-Express trains to and from Ulm.

In the south of the city is the Industriebahn Aalen (Aalen industrial railway), an industrial line run by the city, over which some 250 wagon loads are hauled each year.

=== Long distance ===
Line	Route	Frequency
IC 61	Leipzig – Naumburg – Jena Paradies – Saalfeld – Lichtenfels – Bamberg – Nuremberg – Ansbach – Aalen – Stuttgart – Karlsruhe	Every two hours

=== Regional services ===
Line	Route	Frequency
RE 1	Aalen – Schwäbisch Gmünd – Stuttgart – Karlsruhe	Every two hours
RE 50	Aalen – Heidenheim – Ulm	Every two hours
MEX 13	Stuttgart – Schwäbisch Gmünd – Aalen (– Ellwangen – Crailsheim)	Half-hourly; every hour to Ellwangen, every two hours to Crailsheim
RB 89 RE 89	Aalen – Nördlingen – Donauwörth (– Augsburg – Munich)	Hourly to Donauwörth, every two hours to Munich
RS 5	Ulm – Heidenheim – Aalen	Hourly (additional trains to Heidenheim during peak hours)

== Connections ==
Outside station is the main bus station, opened in 2006, and a park-and-ride car park. At the bus station is the information centre of the Verkehrsgemeinschaft Aalen (Aalen Transport Corporation). In 2003 a bike parking area with 204 places was opened, which is under video surveillance for protection from theft.

== Other stations in Aalen ==
The other stations in Aalen are Wasseralfingen, Unterkochen and Hofen. Goldshöfe station is partly in the town of Aalen and partly in the municipality of Rainau.
