= Hüttlingen, Baden-Württemberg =

Hüttlingen
- Municipality
- Coat of arms

- Location of Hüttlingen within Ostalbkreis district
- Interactive map of Hüttlingen
- Location within Germany Location within Baden-Württemberg
- Coordinates: 48°53′34″N 10°06′02″E
- Country: Germany
- State: Baden-Württemberg
- Admin. region: Stuttgart
- District: Ostalbkreis

Government
  - Mayor (2023–31): Monika Rettenmeier

Area
  - Total: 18.7 km^{2} (7.2 sq mi)
- Elevation: 408 m (1,339 ft)

Population (2025-12-31)
  - Total: 6,079
  - Density: 325/km^{2} (842/sq mi)
- Time zone: UTC+01:00 (CET)
  - Summer (DST): UTC+02:00 (CEST)
- Postal codes: 73460
- Dialling codes: 07361
- Vehicle registration: AA
- Website: www.huettlingen.de

Hüttlingen (German pronunciation: [ˈhʏtlɪŋən]) is a municipality in the German state of Baden-Württemberg, in Ostalbkreis district.

== Geography ==
=== Location ===
Hüttlingen lies on the eastern edge of the Swabian Alb at 400 to 503 meters above sea level at the Kocher river bend, about seven kilometers from the district town of Aalen.

=== Neighboring municipalities ===
The municipality borders Neuler to the northwest, Rainau to the northeast, Abtsgmünd to the west, and the district town of Aalen to the south.

=== Municipal divisions ===
The municipality of Hüttlingen includes the village of Hüttlingen, the hamlets of Albanuskling, Mittellengenfeld, Niederalfingen, Oberlengenfeld, Seitsberg, Sulzdorf, the farms of Halmeshof, Lachenschafhaus, Obersiegenbühl, Unterlengenfeld and Untersiegenbühl, and the houses Fuchshäusle, Haldenschafhaus, Straubenmühle and Zanken, as well as the deserted villages of Aushof, Haselhof and Rotschafhaus.

== History ==
=== Antiquity ===
The Upper Germanic-Raetian Limes (ORL), a section of the former outer border of the Roman Empire, ran through Hüttlingen's district and made a bend in a field across from the Wasserstall residential area on the Hochfeld path. Using geophysical prospecting in 2012, the remains of two Limes towers were located.

Around 260 AD, the Romans withdrew from the area south of the Limes on the right bank of the Rhine and left bank of the Iller up to Lake Constance, an area Tacitus called the Decumate Lands, so that from then on the entire left bank of the Rhine formed the new border of the Roman Empire. The ending "-ingen" in the name Hüttlingen indicates that during the subsequent period, the family of an Alemannic tribal leader named "Hutilo" may have founded the first settlement at the Kocher river bend.

=== Middle Ages ===
In the High Middle Ages, the Hüttlingen area lay in the northern border region of the Swabian tribal duchy.

The first documented mention of Hüttlingen occurred as Hutlinga in 1024 in a charter by which Emperor Henry II declared the forest of the Ellwangen Monastery named "Virigund" to be a banforst (imperial forest). This charter was issued on 5 February 1024 in Bamberg. Niederalfingen was first documented in 1475. The town of Hüttlingen was part of the castle and lordship of Niederalfingen.

=== Modern Era ===
In 1551, the Fuggers acquired the castle of Niederalfingen. At that time, there were about 21 farmers, 15 cottagers, 14 householders and some craftsmen, two innkeepers and a mill in Hüttlingen. Thus, Hüttlingen was mainly dominated by agriculture. The Fuggers remained the local lords of Hüttlingen until the mediatization. The town remained predominantly Catholic even after the Reformation until the end of World War II.

As a result of the mediatization, Hüttlingen came to the Kingdom of Württemberg and initially belonged to the Oberamt of Ellwangen and from 1810 to the Oberamt of Aalen. During the district reform during the Nazi era in Württemberg, Hüttlingen became part of the Aalen district in 1938. In 1945, the town became part of the American occupation zone and thus part of the newly founded state of Württemberg-Baden, which merged into the present state of Baden-Württemberg in 1952. As part of the district reform of 1973, Hüttlingen became part of the Ostalbkreis district.

== Religions ==
There is a Roman Catholic and a Protestant church community in Hüttlingen. The Catholic parish of Holy Cross belongs to the Ostalb deanery. The Protestant church community of Wasseralfingen-Hüttlingen is part of the Evangelical-Lutheran Church in Württemberg.

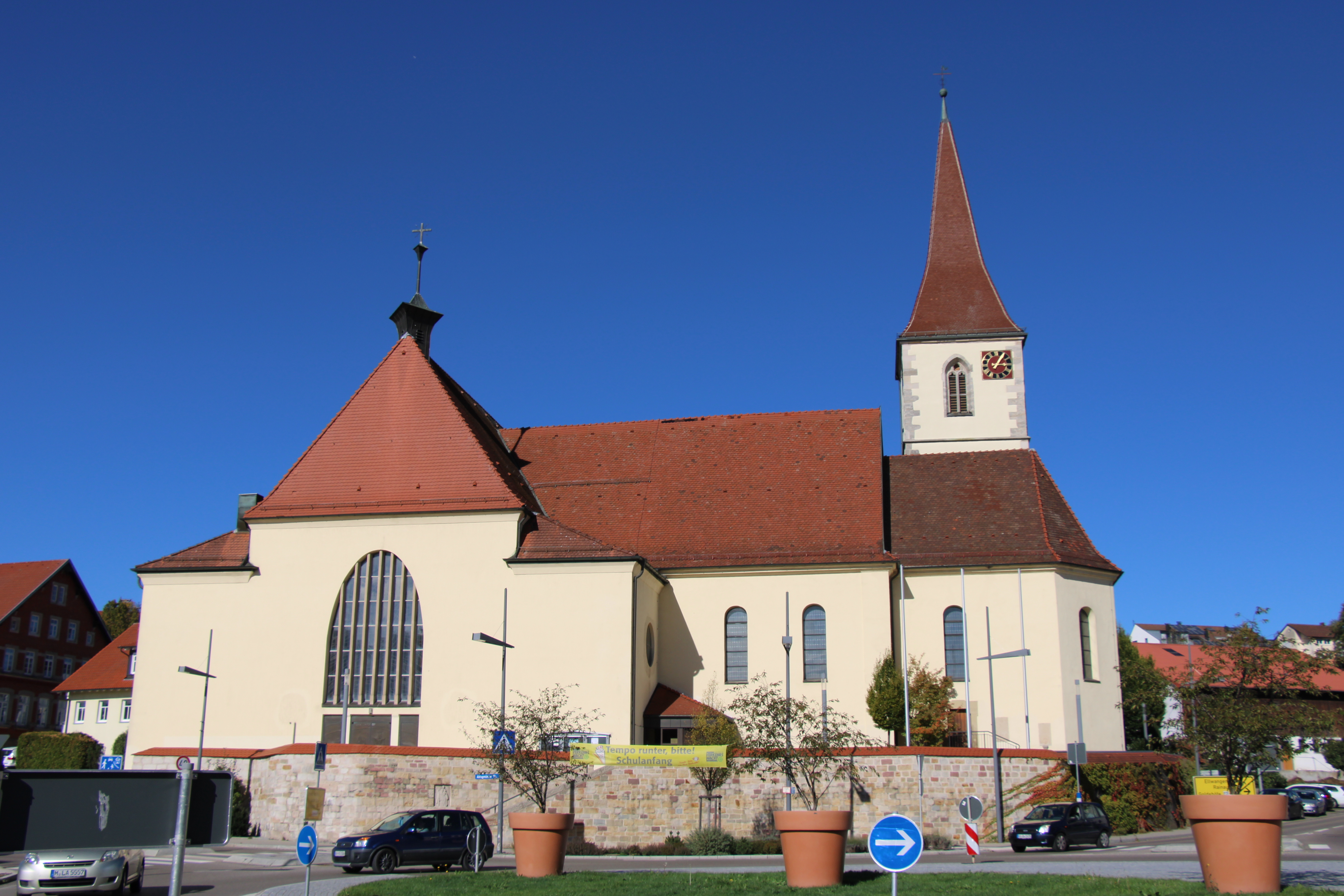
Holy Cross Church (Catholic)

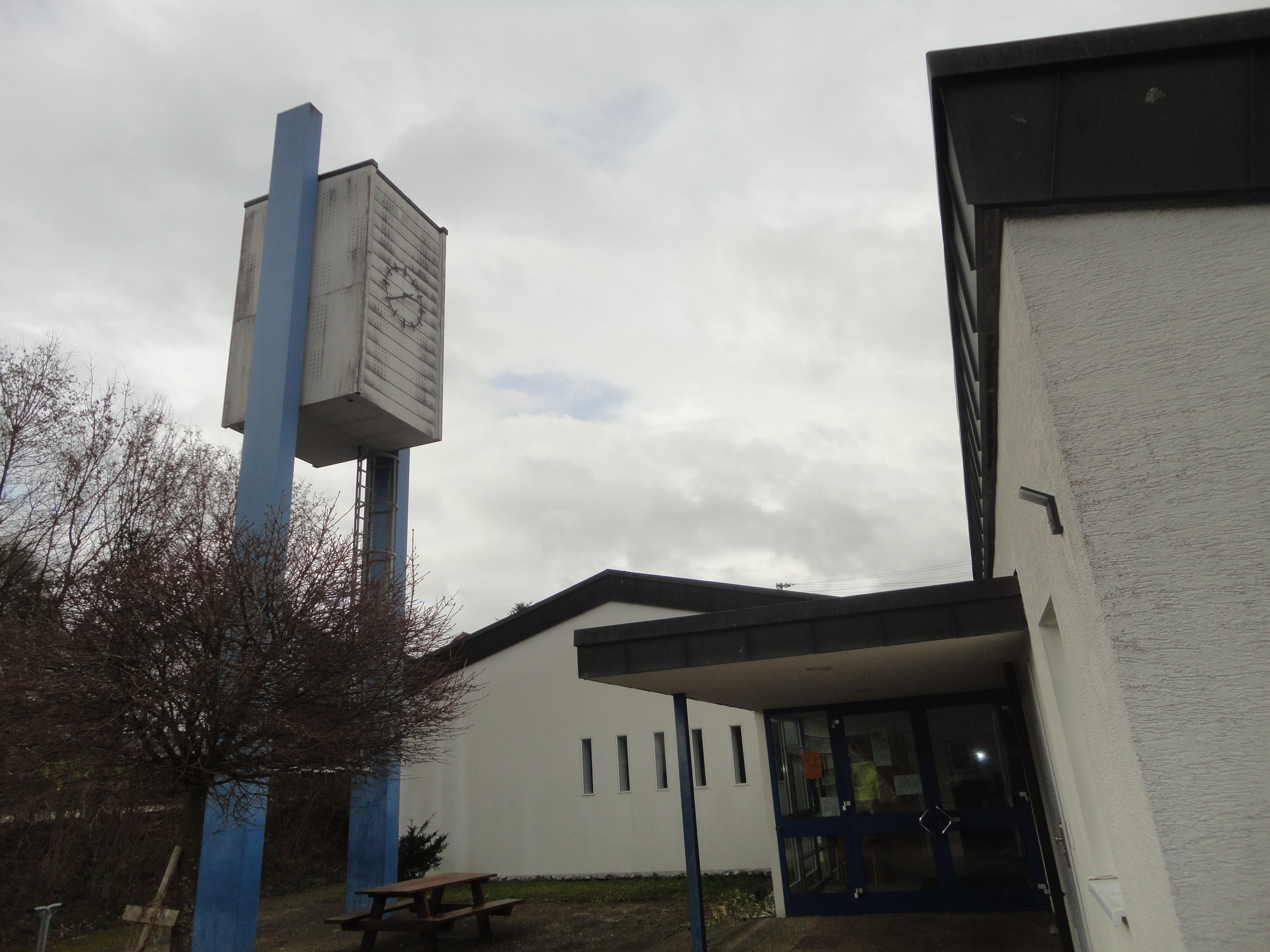
Reconciliation Church (Protestant)

== Politics ==
=== Municipal council ===
Result of the municipal election on June 7, 2009:

- Citizens' List 54.0% (+2.3) - 10 seats (+1)
- CDU 46.0% (-2.3) - 9 seats (±0)

The municipal council election on 26 May 2019 led to the following result (with changes from the 2014 election):

Party/List	Vote	Share +/- % Points	Seats	+/−
Citizens' List	51.0%	− 0.3	8	± 0
CDU	49.0%	+ 0.3	8	± 0

=== Mayor ===
1948 to 1978: Albert Brobeil Until 2002: Gert-Günter Schulz 2002 to 2024: Günter Ensle, elected in January 2010 with 97.7 percent of the votes and re-elected in January 2018 with 87.9 percent of the votes. Since 2024: Monika Rettenmeier, elected on 3 December 2023 with 88.1 percent of the votes.

=== Administrative association ===
The municipality is a member of the Vereinbarte Verwaltungsgemeinschaft of the city of Aalen.

=== Partnerships ===
Hüttlingen maintains friendly relations with the Italian municipality of Cotignola (Province of Ravenna).

== Culture and sights ==
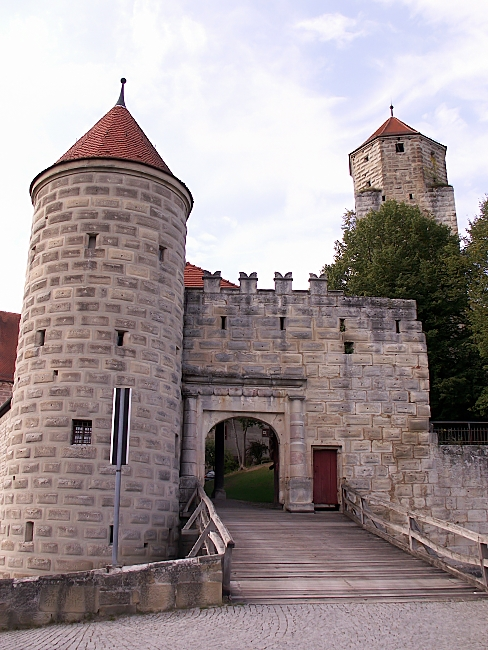
Marienburg Niederalfingen

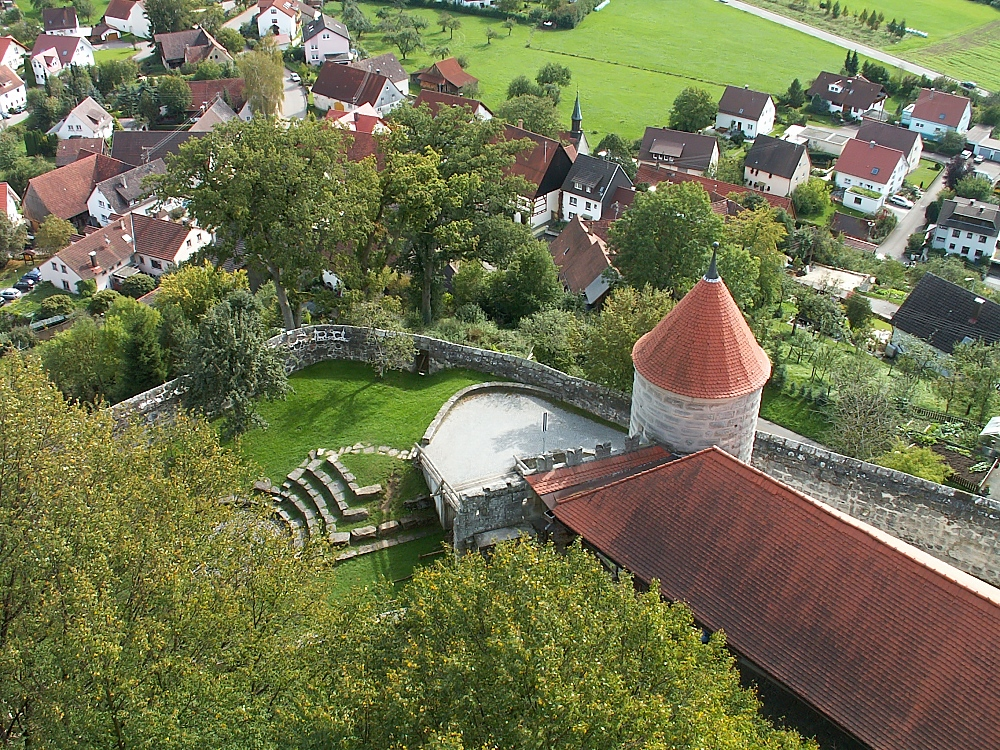
Niederalfingen seen from the bergfried of Marienburg

The Raetian Limes ran right through Hüttlingen. At the Limes Facility on the Kocher, replicas of various construction styles of palisades and wall sections can be viewed.

Marienburg in the district of Niederalfingen is now used as a youth education center, recreational facility and school camp. The Vogtei building below the castle houses the local museum of the municipality of Hüttlingen.

There is also an outdoor swimming pool in Niederalfingen. The municipal area has several soccer fields and chapels.

=== Clubs and associations ===
The Hüttlingen local group of the Swabian Alb Association, founded in 1896, was awarded the Eichendorff Plaque in 1996.

SG Hofen/Hüttlingen is a handball club made up of the founding clubs TSV Hüttlingen and TG Hofen.

== Economy and infrastructure ==
=== Transportation ===
Hüttlingen is located at the intersection of federal highways B19 (Eisenach–Oberstdorf) and B29 (Aalen–Nördlingen), near the highway exit to the A7 autobahn (Ulm–Würzburg).

Trains on the Aalen–Crailsheim (Obere Jagstbahn) and Aalen–Donauwörth (Riesbahn) lines stop at the Goldshöfe station, about 2 km from the center of Hüttlingen.

Rail and bus lines of the local public transport can be used at the fares of the OstalbMobil transport associations, as well as the respective transport company's own fares.

=== Long-distance cycle routes ===
Several long-distance cycle routes pass through the town:

- The German Limes Cycle Route follows the Upper Germanic-Raetian Limes for 818 km from Bad Hönningen on the Rhine to Regensburg on the Danube.
- The Kocher-Jagst Cycle Route is a roughly 340 km long circular cycle route along the Kocher and Jagst rivers in Baden-Württemberg, with the two rivers only a few kilometers apart.

=== Long-distance hiking trails ===
The Limes Trail of the Swabian Alb Association, a section of the German Limes Trail, crosses the Kocher River near Hüttlingen.

=== Education ===
There is an elementary and secondary modern school (Werkrealschule) in the town called the Alemannenschule; grades 5-7 of the Werkrealschule are taught at the branch in Neuler, while grades 8-10 are in Hüttlingen. There are also four Catholic kindergartens.

=== Energy ===
East of Hüttlingen is the 380/220/110 kV Goldshöfe substation.
