= Goldshöfe–Crailsheim railway =

Railway line in Baden-Württemberg, Germany

Goldshöfe–Crailsheim
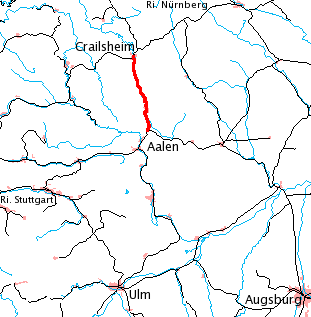

Overview
- Native name: Obere Jagstbahn
- Line number: 4940
- Locale: Baden-Württemberg, Germany
- Termini: Goldshöfe; Crailsheim

Service
- Route number: 786 (Stuttgart–Nuremberg)

Technical
- Line length: 30.4 km (18.9 mi)
- Electrification: 15 kV/16.7 Hz AC catenary
- Operating speed: 120 km/h (75 mph) (max)

The Goldshöfe–Crailsheim railway (also known in German as the Obere Jagstbahn—Upper Jagst Railway) is a line from Goldshöfe to Crailsheim in the German state of Baden-Württemberg. It is part of the route of InterCity services between Karlsruhe and Nuremberg and is single-track and electrified. The line follows the course of the upper Jagst river, which it is named after. The prefix distinguishes it from the Lower Jagst Railway (Unteren Jagstbahn), which is the Bad Friedrichshall–Osterburken section of the modern Franconia Railway (Frankenbahn).

== History ==
In 1863 the line from Aalen to Nördlingen was completed; this line is now part of the Stuttgart-Bad Cannstatt–Nördlingen railway (also known as the Riesbahn). Since the construction of the route to Crailsheim was already planned at that time, Goldshöfe station was built as a junction station (Trennungsbahnhof, literally "separation station"). The two lines share an entrance building, which lies between the two lines. The line from Goldshöfe to Crailsheim opened on 15 November 1866. In 1870, there were suggestions of building a connection from Ellwangen to Dinkelsbühl and continuing to Nuremberg. However, these plans were rejected for the much shorter route via Crailsheim and Ansbach (the Nuremberg–Crailsheim railway). In 1939, it was decided to duplicate the single-track Goldshöfe–Crailsheim railway, but these plans came to nothing due to the outbreak of World War II.

The operation of electric trains on the Goldshöfe–Crailsheim railway was possible from 14 May 1985 and regular electrical operation commenced at the timetable change on 2 June 1985.

== Operations ==
The line is electrified and single-track, and completely equipped with H/V (Haupt-/Vorsignal-System) colour light signals. Only Goldshöfe station still has semaphore signals, operated by two mechanical signal boxes. The maximum speed limit on the line is 120 km/h, although it is only reached on the southern section. The regional plan of Ostwürttemberg envisages the duplication of the line.

There are passing loops in Jagstheim (not for passenger trains), Jagstzell and Ellwangen. In the course of electrification in 1985 the sidings in Stimpfach and Schwabsberg were removed. All sidings for freight transport in Ellwangen were removed in September 2003.

Some stations do not conform to modern standards. Thus, the height of the platforms in Ellwangen and Goldshöfe are below the minimum standard of 38 cm above rail level. The central platforms of the stations are only reached by crossing the tracks on the flat. Currently (winter of 2010–2011) the platform in Ellwangen is being renovated. In Schrezheim, a level crossing will be replaced by an underpass. In Ellwangen-Rindelbach an existing underpass will be upgraded. These will replace two level crossings, which will be closed. In the summer of 2010, the platforms in Jagstzell were modernised.

For some time there have been efforts to reactivate Jagstheim station, which is no longer used for passengers, and Stimpfach station, which is disused. The city of Ellwangen is also pressing for the construction of a station at Ellwangen-Rindelbach.

In November 2009, the Ostwürttemberg Region commissioned a feasibility study on the duplication of the line and the establishment of additional stations between Ellwangen and Crailsheim.

=== Regional services ===
The MEX 13 services run hourly on the Ulm–Crailsheim route from Ulm to Ellwangen, with every second train extended to Crailsheim. The journey time from Aalen to Crailsheim is 43 minutes. In the opposite direction trains take 40 minutes, because of the limited passing opportunities, which mostly occur in Jagstzell. The main vehicles used for regional services on the line are class 650 Regio-Shuttles. Because of cutbacks in public transport in Baden Württemberg, the existing schedule has become thinner.

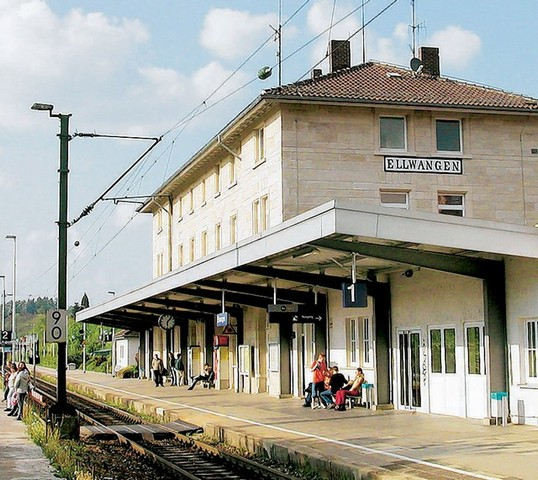
Ellwangen station

Goldshöfe station was originally built not to serve the location, but as a junction station on the lines from Aalen to Nördlingen and to Crailsheim. Today many people from the nearby municipalities of Hüttlingen and Buch (in the municipality of Rainau) use Goldshöfe station.

=== Long distance ===
From 1991 to 2002, the Goldshöfe–Crailsheim railway was served by InterRegio services on the Stuttgart–Aalen–Crailsheim–Nuremberg route. Since 2002, InterCity trains on line IC 61 run on the (Basel SBB–) Karlsruhe–Pforzheim–Stuttgart–Aalen–Nuremberg route at two-hour intervals.

Some freight trains run on the Goldshöfe–Crailsheim railway between Stuttgart and Nuremberg.
