= Stuttgart-Bad Cannstatt–Nördlingen railway =

Railway line route in Baden-Württemberg, Germany

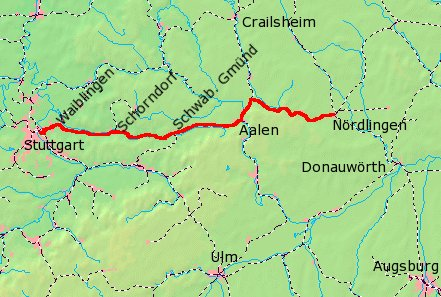

Overview
- Line number: 4710; 4713 (S-Bahn tracks); 4714 (Fellbach–Waiblingen)
- Locale: Baden-Württemberg and Bavaria, Germany

Service
- Route number: 786; 790.2-3 (Stuttgart S-Bahn); 989 (Aalen–Donauwörth)

Technical
- Line length: 111.543 km (69.310 mi)
- Track gauge: 1,435 mm (4 ft 8 1/2 in) standard gauge
- Electrification: 15 kV/16.7 Hz AC overhead catenary
- Operating speed: 140 km/h (90 mph)

The Stuttgart-Bad Cannstatt–Nördlingen railway is a main line in Baden-Württemberg and Bavaria, Germany. It branches off the Stuttgart–Ulm railway at Stuttgart-Bad Cannstatt station and runs via Aalen to Nördlingen, which merges with the Augsburg–Nördlingen railway. Between Bad Cannstatt and Goldshöfe, the line is part of the long-distance inter-regional connection between Stuttgart and Nuremberg. The line has two tracks from Bad Cannstatt to Goldshöfe, and the remaining section is single track. The line is fully electrified, and the western section from Stuttgart to Schorndorf is part of the Stuttgart S-Bahn.

The line is also known as the Remsbahn (Rems Railway) or the Remstalbahn (Rems Valley Railway) and is the main line from Stuttgart-Bad Cannstatt via Aalen to Nördlingen. Today, the designation Remsbahn only refers to the section from Stuttgart to Aalen, while the Aalen–Nördlingen section is considered part of the Riesbahn (Ries Railway). Between Waiblingen and Essingen, the Remsbahn runs parallel to the River Rems, from which it gets its name. The Riesbahn is named after the Nördlinger Ries and continues to Donauwörth.

== Route ==
The line's chainage is measured from Stuttgart Bad Cannstatt station. A short distance from the station, the four tracks of the line separate from the Fils Valley Railway at a flying junction. At about the same point, the tracks of the Rems line are rearranged to be paired by direction of operation, with S-Bahn trains running on the outer tracks and regional and long-distance trains running on the inner tracks. The line climbs about 60 metres on an S-bend to Fellbach. Stuttgart Nürnberger Straße station is located at the change of curves, where the bend to the left changes to a bend to the right.

Another elongated, single-track flyover structure was built between Fellbach and Waiblingen before the S-Bahn entered service. This structure allows trains to and from Schwäbisch Hall-Hessental to cross trains on the Remsbahn without getting in each other's way. A fifth track was later built here to reduce interference between fast and S-Bahn trains.

The Waiblingen–Schwäbisch Hall railway branches off at Waiblingen station. The Rems Railway continues as a double-track line through the Rems valley, and crosses the Haldenbach river outside Endersbach station on a round-arched viaduct.

A low point of 234 metres is reached at Beutelsbach. In Schorndorf, the Wieslauf Valley Railway branches off to Welzheim. The line crosses the Rems before Urbach and follows the course of the Rems until Essingen. In Schwäbisch Gmünd, the Hohenstaufen Railway branched off to Göppingen from 1911 to 1984.

The line follows the course of the Rems to Essingen. While the Rems flows into the main valley from the south, the Remsbahn follows the main valley to the east, which runs over a watershed near Essingen into the Kocher valley. A tunnel was initially planned for this watershed, but a slightly longer route with a curve and a cutting was built. A predominantly straight line could be built throughout this valley without major artificial structures.

After Aalen Hauptbahnhof, the line continues north along the Kocher to Goldshöfe station. The line to Crailsheim branches off to the north; originally, Goldshöfe station was built to allow train changes, and it was not intended to serve the local population. Up to the end of the line in Nördlingen, a somewhat more winding route and a tunnel through the foothills of the Swabian Jura near Lauchheim were necessary.

== History ==
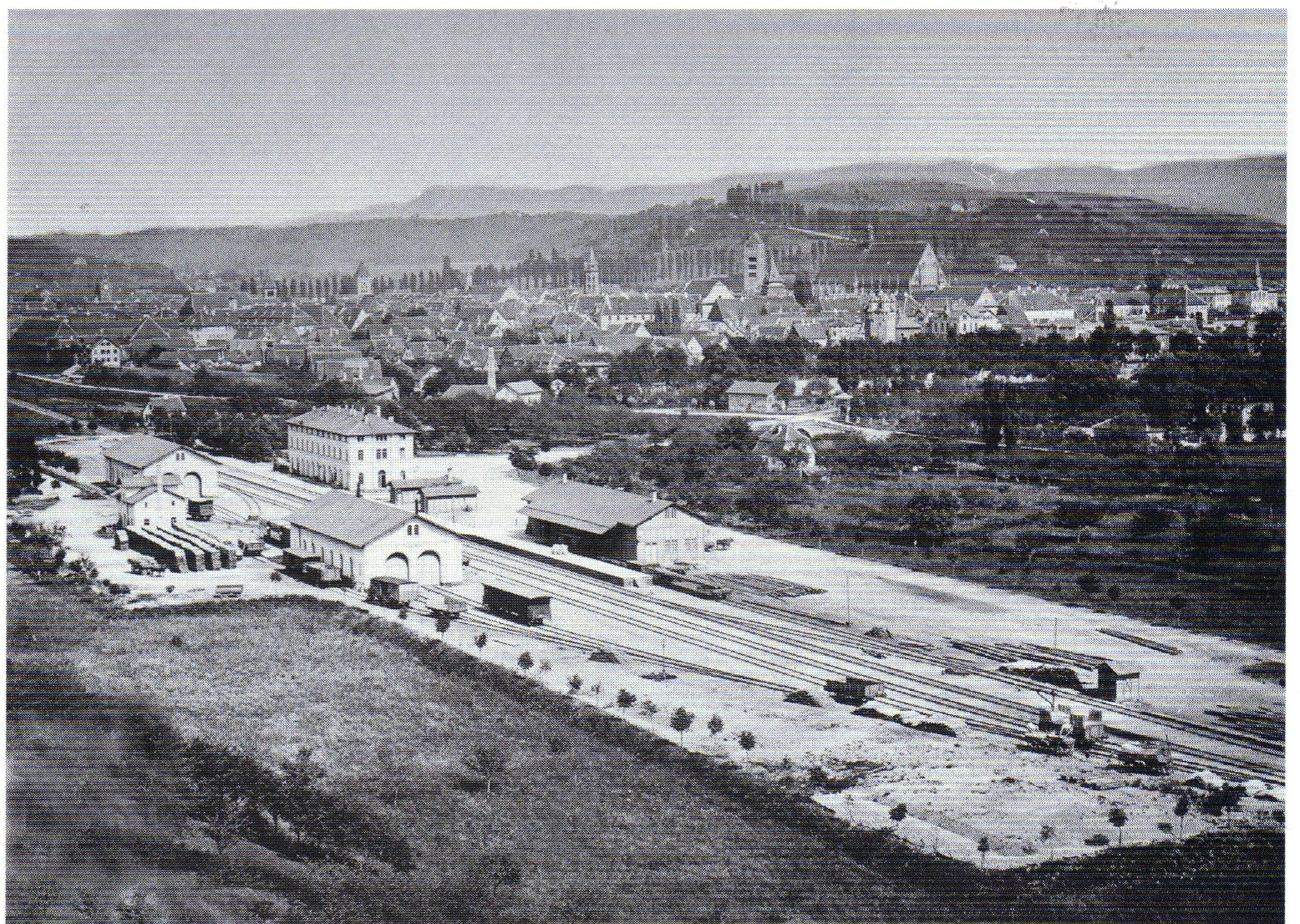
Schwäbisch Gmünd station around 1868

A railway between Stuttgart and Ulm was one of the first railways proposed in Württemberg in the middle of the 19th century. Alternative alignments via Aalen or directly via Göppingen were discussed. At first, it seemed the first route, even though it was indirect, had a greater chance of being built, as it required no major climbs, in contrast to the second route. After several years of discussion, it was decided to build the route via Göppingen, despite the challenge of building the line over the Swabian Alb up the Geislinger Steige. The Fils Railway was opened in 1850.

However, after the first phase of the Royal Württemberg State Railwaysnetwork was completed, constructing a railway line to the east of the country was soon back on the agenda. The main objectives put forward for the project, initially called the Nordostbahn (“Northeast Railway"), were:

- to open up the industrial sites at Gmünd (now Schwäbisch Gmünd), Aalen, its current district of Wasseralfingen and Heidenheim an der Brenz
- to create a connection with the Bavarian railways at Nördlingen

The architect responsible for planning the line, Georg Morlok, examined four major variants for the route with different locations for the transition from the Neckar and Fils valley to the Rems valley. These were from west to east:

1. via Cannstatt and Waiblingen
2. via Plochingen and Schorndorf
3. via Uhingen and Lorch
4. via Eislingen and Gmünd

Although the cost of crossing the mountain range was found to be the least for the western variant, the total cost of the eastern variant was the lowest, because the length of track that would have to be built in the Rems valley would be considerably lower, as it would share part of the Stuttgart–Ulm route. In the subsequent discussions, the requests of the cities of Waiblingen and Schorndorf for a rail connection, the smaller climbs, which would allow easier operations and the shorter route between Stuttgart and Aalen contributed to the decision to select the first variant.

=== From the opening of the line ===
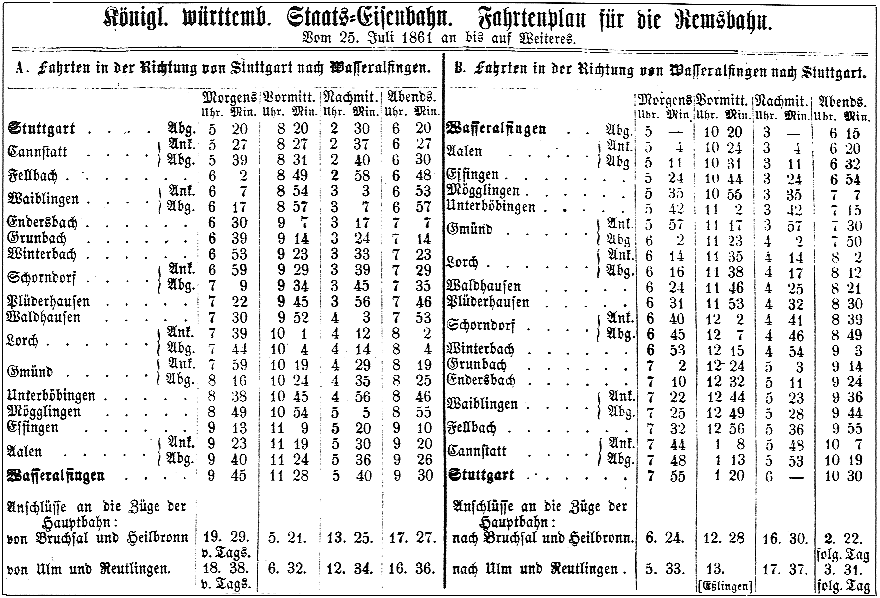
1861 timetable

Thus, on 25 July 1861, the line opened from Cannstatt via Waiblingen, Schorndorf, Gmünd, and Aalen to Wasseralfingen. This was the location of the Schwäbische Hüttenwerke, then a major state steelworks. This steelworks delivered all of its steel that was moved by rail via the Rems line until the mid-1860s. The fastest regular service then ran between Wasseralfingen and Stuttgart in 2 hours, 55 minutes.

The line was equipped with signalmen's houses about once every kilometre and with an electric telegraph. In 1863, the second section to Nördlingen was opened, connecting the Rems line to the Bavarian Ludwig South-North Railway. This was after the line crossing the border at Ulm/Neu-Ulm (now part of the Ulm–Augsburg railway), the second link built between the railways of Württemberg and Bavaria. On lease, the 3.75 km section between the border and the Bavarian town of Nördlingen was operated by the Württemberg State Railways. There was a separate entrance in the Nördlingen terminus, with its hall for the Rems Railway.

The line was initially built as a single track, but duplication was planned from the outset. It was duplicated from Cannstatt to Fellbach in 1864, Waiblingen in 1876, Schorndorf in 1899, Lorch in 1902, Deinbach in 1905, Gmünd in 1910, Unterböbingen in 1920, then Essingen, and Aalen in 1926. The Aalen–Goldshöfe line was duplicated in 1866, completing the duplication achieved to date.

On 1 May 1897, the connecting line was opened from Untertürkheim to the Rems line towards Fellbach. It opens just before the site of the current Rems line Nürnberger Straße station, creating a triangular junction between Bad Cannstatt, Untertürkheim and Nürnberger Straße. Together with today's Schuster Railway (Schusterbahn, then called the Kornwestheim–Untertürkheim line), its purpose was to relieve Stuttgart Hauptbahnhof of freight traffic.

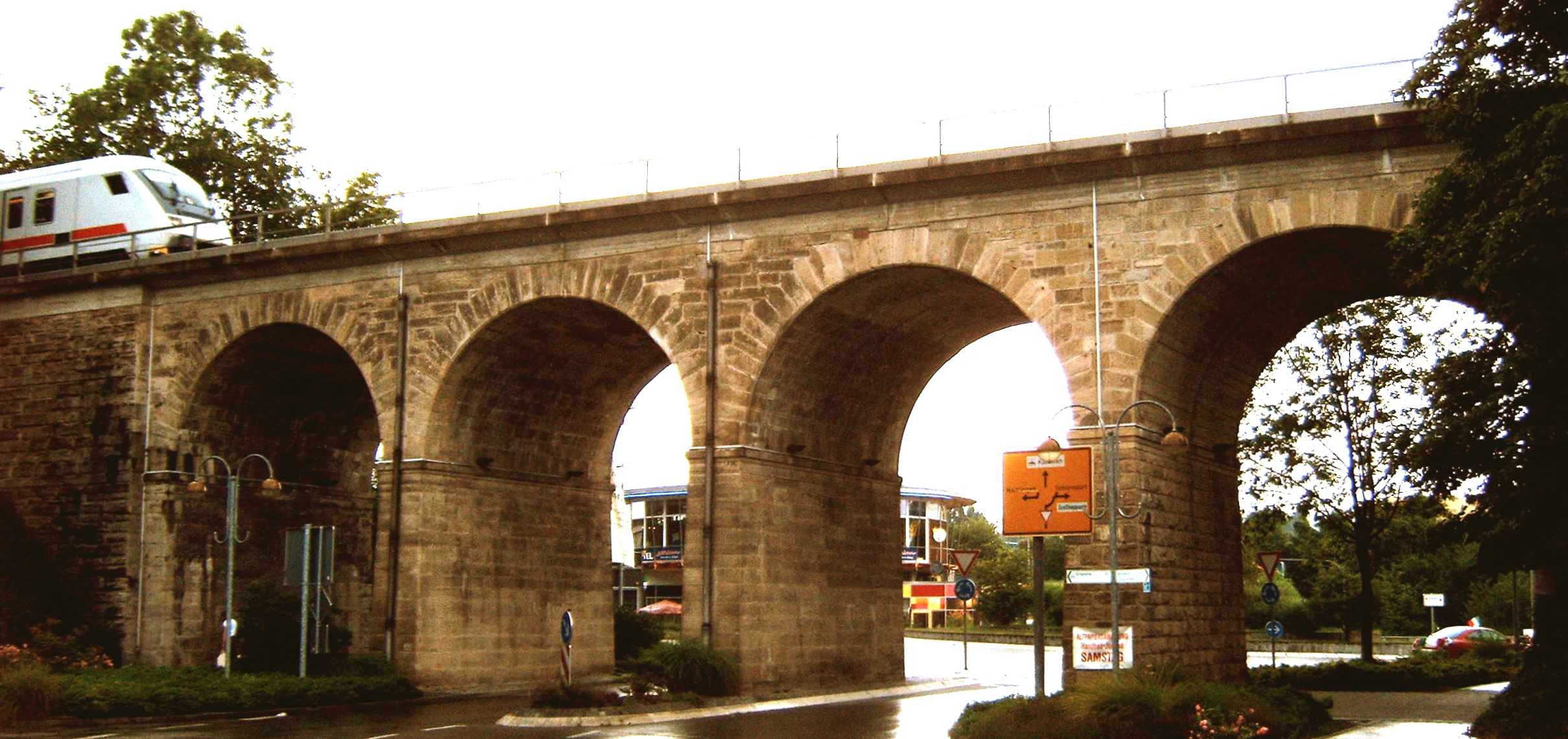
Haldenbach Viaduct in Endersbach

At the end of World War II, the German military blew up the viaduct over the Haldenbach west of Endersbach station and the bridge over the Kocher west of Aalen, so that the intervening places were only accessible via the Hohenstaufen Railway from Schwäbisch Gmünd to Göppingen on the Fils Railway. Pioneers of the U.S. Army built a temporary bridge in Endersbach, so that in August 1945, the line was accessible again. Traffic was also restored over the Kocher in Aalen during the summer of 1945.

=== After the Second World War ===
The Rems Railway was electrified, starting from Stuttgart, to Waiblingen in 1949, to Schorndorf in 1962, to Aalen in 1971 and in 1972 on the Ries Railway from Aalen to Nördlingen and Donauwörth. The line was electrified as an alternative route for traffic between Stuttgart and Munich via Ulm, for the Olympic Games in Munich.

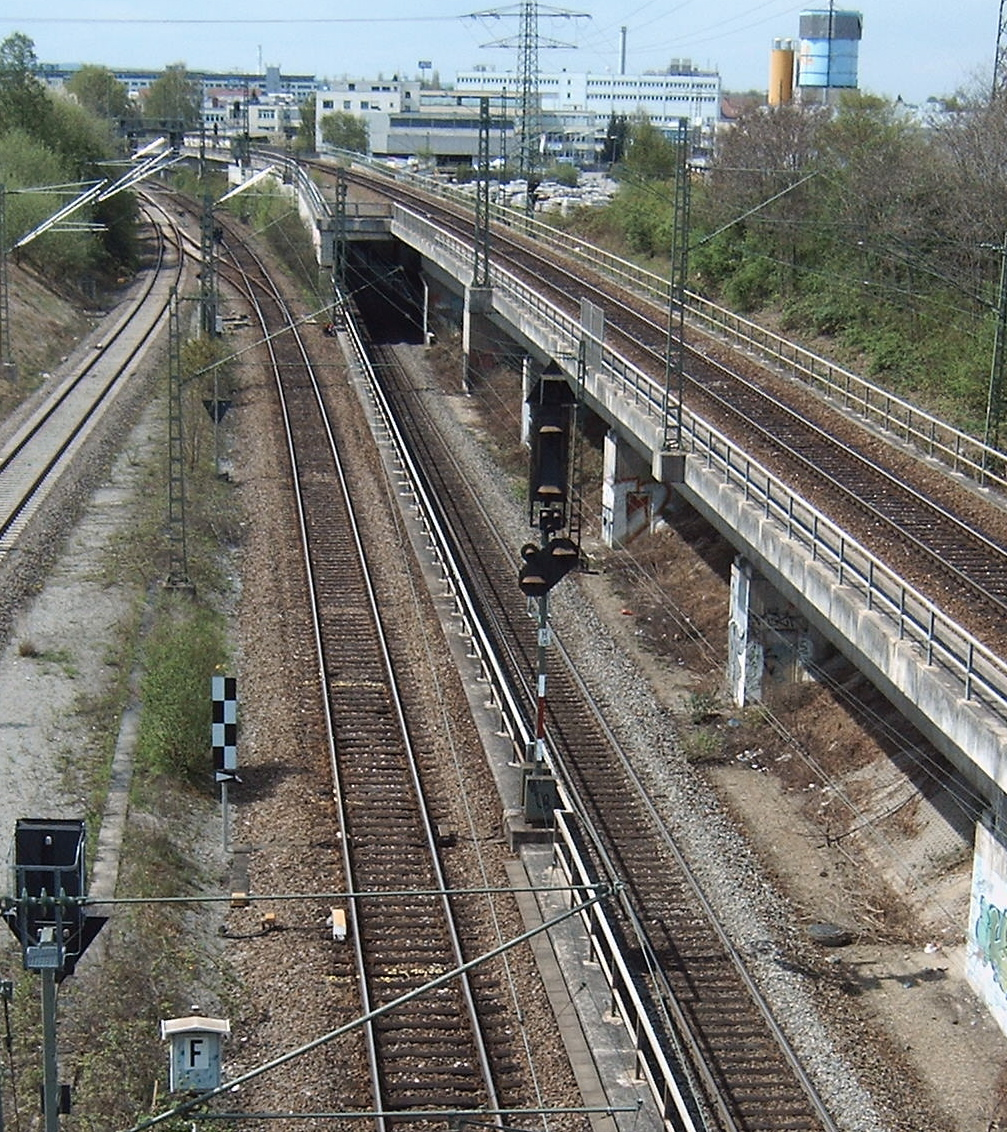
Flyover between Fellbach and Waiblingen (2006). Left: the fifth track opened in 2005. Right: another running line covered by the flyover

From 1978 to 1981, a third and fourth track were built on the Bad Cannstatt–Waiblingen section and a flying junction was built between Fellbach and Waiblingen, where the Murr railway branches off. Thus, in 1981, Stuttgart S-Bahn services could operate to Backnang and Schorndorf.

In 1983 and 1984, a portion of the Rheingold ran from Mannheim via Heidelberg, Heilbronn, Stuttgart and over the Rems line, continuing to Nördlingen and Donauwörth to Munich. This route was chosen for tourist reasons despite the longer travel time. However, it had low patronage and was incompatible with the reinstated InterCity system.

The line's electrification from Goldshöfe via Crailsheim to Nuremberg in 1985 allowed trains on the Rems line to Nuremberg, which had previously been hauled by diesel locomotives, to be electrically hauled.

In the early 1980s, Deutsche Bundesbahn introduced approximately hourly expresses on the line. Modernised vehicles were introduced for the summer 1988 timetable, running hourly daily. These trains ran from the summer 1989 timetable under the generic name of RegionalSchnellBahn ("regional fast rail").

In 1996, the interval between Stuttgart S-Bahn services was reduced from 20 minutes to 15 minutes in the peak period. Before its introduction, Deutsche Bundesbahn had suggested that the service increase would require additional tracks on the section between Waiblingen and Schorndorf, which was almost at capacity with the combined operation of S-Bahn and other trains. However, a report by RWTH Aachen University in 1993 concluded that the planned operations could be realised by shortening signal blocks on the line and modifying Waiblingen station. Deutsche Bundesbahn agreed to implement these measures in 1993, and new signalling was implemented on the Waiblingen–Schorndorf section with the Ks-Signalsystem.

It was found that the timetable was still vulnerable to disruptions. To resolve this, a fifth track was installed in about 2000 on the section between Fellbach and Waiblingen, so that long-distance and S-Bahn trains could run from Fellbach to Waiblingen towards Schorndorf at the same time.

Simultaneously with these upgrades for passenger traffic, freight facilities were dismantled everywhere, as elsewhere in Germany at this time. In particular, the operation of small and medium-sized railway sidings and freight yards was closed. However, the once large freight yard at Schwäbisch Gmünd is also now closed.

The line was closed from December 2002 to December 2003 due to a landslide on the Bildwasen Tunnel between Lauchheim and Aufhausen. The east portal of the tunnel was then extensively renovated.

Until 2006, night trains ran via Aalen on the Stuttgart–Dresden and Stuttgart–Prague routes. The trains in the opposite direction ran alternatively via Schwäbisch Hall-Hessental.

The line was renovated in 2009 and, among other things, around 68 kilometres of track and 47 sets of points were renewed. The platforms at the Westhausen, Lauchheim, Aufhausen, Bopfingen and Pflaumloch stations were also rebuilt to provide accessibility. From 24 April to 15 October 2009, the line between Schorndorf and Nördlingen was completely closed in two construction phases. During the closure, there was a rail replacement bus service for local transport. During this time, Intercity Line 61 (Nuremberg–Karlsruhe) was diverted between Crailsheim and Waiblingen via Schwäbisch Hall-Hessental. The project cost €50 million. Further renovation related to the Schorndorf–Waiblingen section was carried out from July to September 2013. The S2 therefore only ran every half hour during peak hour and the Regional-Express between Aalen and Stuttgart every hour. The section was completely closed from 30 August to 2 September 2013, and a rail replacement service was established.

On 9 June 2019, Go-Ahead Verkehrsgesellschaft Deutschland took over regional services on the Waiblingen–Aalen section from DB Regio Baden-Württemberg. A depot with a workshop was built in Essingen.

The line between Bad Cannstatt and Waiblingen was completely closed from 12 May to 9 June 2023 for work on the Waiblingen digital interlocking.

== Prospects ==
Two new stations are planned to be built in the Ostalb district. In 2016, it was decided to establish Aalen-West station between the Hofherrnweiler district and the western industrial estate. The station was originally scheduled to open in 2020. However, due to different opinions among the parties involved regarding the appropriate platform height, there was a delay of several years, so construction can probably only begin in the mid-2020s.

== Operations ==
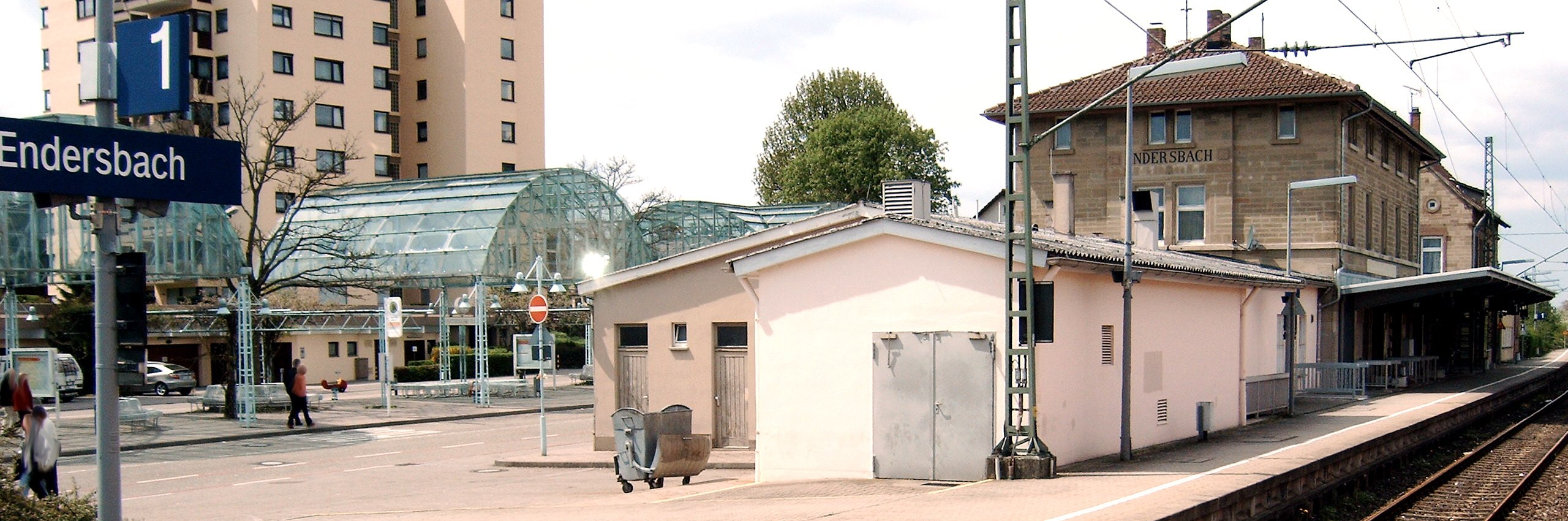
Endersbach station

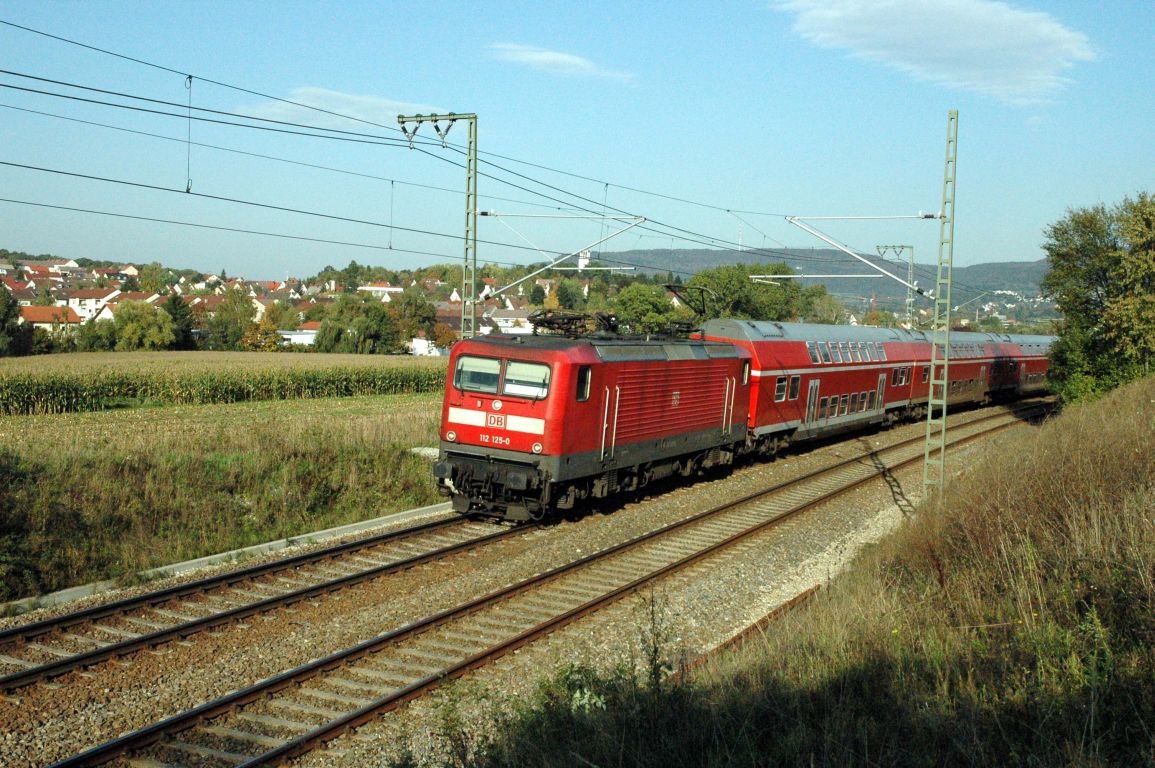
RegionalExpress to Stuttgart near Aalen

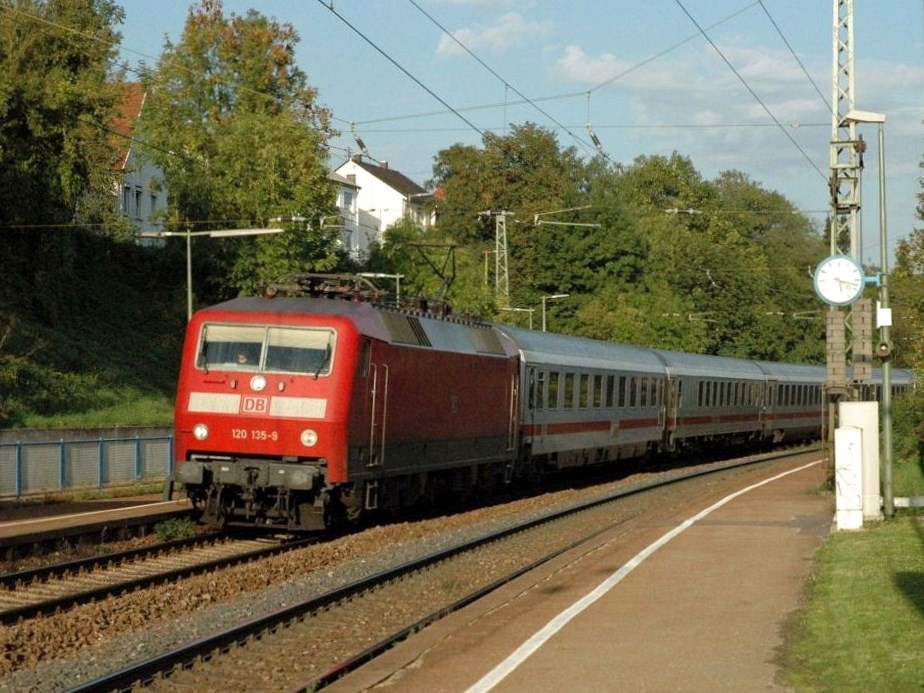
InterCity to Stuttgart passing through Mögglingen (October 2004)

=== Stuttgart S-Bahn ===
Lines S 2 and S 3 of the Stuttgart S-Bahn serve the Stuttgart–Waiblingen section, and line S2 serves the Waiblingen–Schorndorf section.

=== Regional transport ===
The MEX 13 service from Stuttgart to Aalen operates every 30 minutes on weekdays, every hour to Ellwangen and every two hours to Crailsheim. Intermediate stops are Bad Cannstatt, Waiblingen, Schorndorf, and then all stations. This is supplemented by the RE 1 Interregio-Express service, which runs every two hours between Karlsruhe and Aalen, with intermediate stops in Schorndorf and Schwäbisch Gmünd.

Between Aalen and Donauwörth, regional trains on line RB 89 run every hour from Monday to Friday. Until the 2022/2023 timetable change, operations were operated by DB Regio Bayern as part of the E-Netz Augsburg under the name Fugger-Express. In December 2022, Go-Ahead took over from DB Bayern. Since then, the hourly service has run daily (previously every two hours on weekends). In addition, trains continue every two hours as RE 89 via Donauwörth to/from Augsburg and Munich.

==== Rollingstock ====
The carriages used in regional transport until 2015 were mainly renovated Silberling carriages. From the timetable change on 12 December 2010, Regional-Express trains at weekends largely consisted of double-deck carriages built from 1994 to 1996. Since 1 February 2016, six trains have been operated with double-deck coaches from Monday to Friday. Only double-decker coaches ran on the RE lines from 1 October 2016 to 8 June 2019. Since Go-Ahead took over operations on 9 June 2019, Stadler FLIRT has used multiple units.

Siemens Mireo electric multiple units are operated by Go-Ahead Bayern between Aalen and Donauwörth.

=== Long distance ===
One InterCity service, IC 61 runs at two-hour intervals on the Karlsruhe–Nuremberg route, stopping in Stuttgart, Schwäbisch Gmünd and Aaalen. At the end of the day, one pair of trains, extending to and from Leipzig, also stops in Schorndorf.
