= Seldeneck Castle =

Building in Creglingen, Bade-Württemberg, Germany

Seldeneck Castle Burg Seldeneck
- Schloss Seldenegk (Slozz Seldenegk), Veste Seldeneck, Burg Selneck, Seltenecker Burg, Sölleck, Selleneck
- Blumweiler District of Creglingen
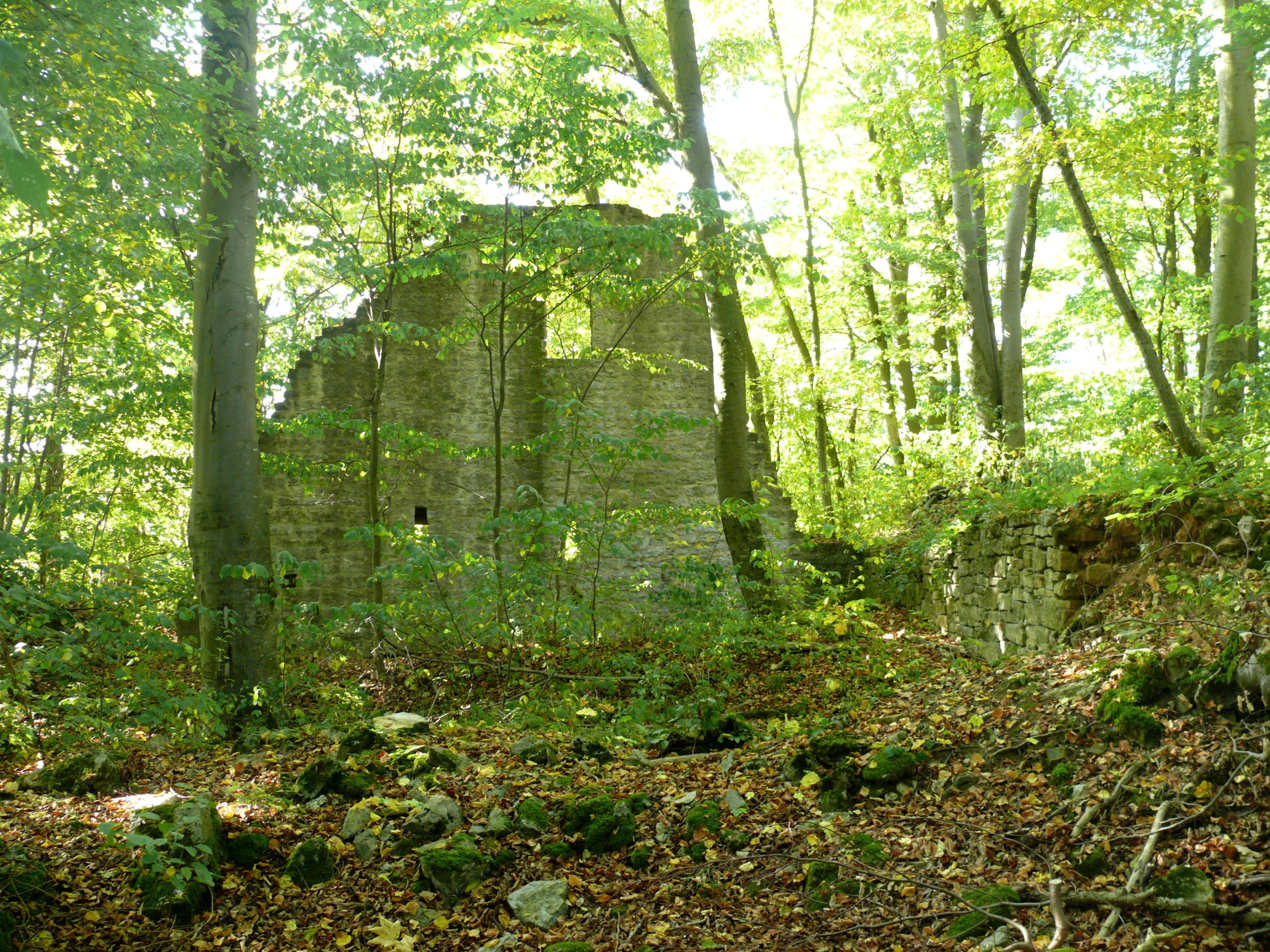
- The ruins of Seldeneck Castle

Site information
- Type: Hill castle, spur position
- Code: DE-BW
- Condition: Ruin

Location
- Coordinates: 49°24′45″N 10°08′56″E
- Height: 392 m above sea level (NHN)

Site history
- Built: 13th century

Seldeneck Castle (German: Burg Seldeneck) is a 13th-century castle ruin near the Seldeneck residential area in the district of Blumweiler, Creglingen, Main-Tauber-Kreis, Baden-Württemberg, Germany.

== Location ==
The spur castle is on the eastern edge of the Creglingen urban area in the small town of Seldeneck, and is located about 392 meters above sea level NHN. It is a few steps from the state border between Baden-Württemberg and Bavaria. The castle stands on the top of a valley spur, which is the steep klinge created by Tauber River. The E8 European long distance path from Rothenburg ob der Tauber leads over the spur from the Tauber valley to the Hohenloher Plain and then to Creglingen, more than ten kilometers to the northwest.

== History ==
The castle was first mentioned by name in 1265, and later mentioned again in 1300. Since the name of the Ministerialis, Heinrich I (Henricus) von Rothenburg, was not associated with Seldeneck until the middle of the 13th century, it is unlikely that the origin of the castle can be traced prior to that point.

The castle was likely originally founded by the father of Götz (Gottfried) von Hohenlohe, a fief of the Bohemian King John the Blind.

Gottfried later hired the a branch of the Nordenberg family, which later became the Seldenecks, as Burgmann to defend the castle. In exchange, the Nordenbergs received shares of the ownership of the castle, and they went on to sell further shares to Conrad and Arnold von Savensheim, sons of Erkinger I von Seinsheim, as well as transferring another share to Kraft II. The castle thus became a ganerbenburg.

At that time the castle belonged to the Oberamt Mergentheim. The mill belonging to the castle, named Adelgersmühle, was first mentioned in 1341 and no longer exist today.

Thus, the castle is probably not, as variously assumed, a founding of the chefs from Nordenberg, of whom the sideline sitting at the castle called itself after Seldeneck and died out in the male line in 1583. They are not to be equated with the Barons of Seldeneck, which was newly created in 1777 from the children of the morganatic marriage with Margrave Wilhelm Ludwig von Baden-Durlach and Wilhelmine Christine Schortmann (1740–1804).

On July 24, 1344, Conrad von Seinsheim of Willanzheim sold all rights to Seldeneck Castle to the Burgraviate of Nuremberg. Seinsheim, his nephew and his brother Arnold had already died at the time of the notarization, and they had sold the parts of the castle as they had previously acquired them from Götz von Hohenlohe, along with all rights to the property, including serfs, associated villages, village shares and hunting rights. Presumably, Conrad had to sell his shares in order to be able to settle the debts of his imperial ban from April of the same year.

At the same time, with the same documented date, Luppold von Seldeneck sold his share of Veste Seldeneck to Burgraves John II and Albrecht. The Seldeneck and Seinsheim seem to have had a close relationship, since they had previously notarized each other. Luppold was allowed to remain at the castle as a Burgvogt. A military group from Gattenhofen was named in 1347, Ullrich Mörder and Eberwein von Seldeneck in 1368, probably all as Burgmann on Seldeneck.

In 1379, Frederick V, who inherited shares of ownership from his father John II, pledged his castle and the billages of Bernheim (probably refers to Burgbernheim) and Bergel. In the year 1393, Cunz von Kirchberg is documented as a bailiff. His successor, Adam von Kirchberg, had to certify his renunciation in 1414, even though the castle had already been destroyed by then.

In the summer of 1404, recorded on July 29, the ownership was transferred from Frederick I, the Burgrave of Nuremberg to the Imperial City of Rothenburg ob der Tauber.

In 1407, Rothenburg ob der Tauber joined the League of Marbach in a revolt against King Rupert, in an attempt to support the deposed predecessor Wenceslaus of Luxembourg. As a result, the city was placed under imperial ban by Rupert, while the Burgraves of Nuremberg and the bishop of Würzburg Johann I von Egloffstein were appointed executors. The city could not be taken, but many castles in the area were destroyed, and the Seldeneck Castle seems to have suffered the same fate. Nevertheless, Rothenberg chronicles still reported about officials at the castle in 1418.

The ruins of the castle were restored in 1985.

== Current condition ==
The former course of the castle walls can still be roughly recognized from individually preserved areas. Its mound falls steeply on three sides, including the Tauber Valley. To the west of today's hamlet, the castle was secured with a moat. Presumably today's hamlet played the role of an folwark for the castle.

For the actual castle, only a long section of a house with embrasure, probably on the ground floor, and an arched window on the first floor can still be seen today. The supporting structure for the higher floors is still clearly visible on the inside of the house. A piece of wall extending at right angles to it has been partially restored. Nearby is a broken component with the remains of two pointed arch windows (possibly as part of the palas or a castle chapel) and parts of the castle wall. In the meantime overgrown remains can still be inferred. All other parts later fell victim to robbery after the castle was destroyed. Since the castle hill is now overgrown with forest again, the view of the Tauber Valley can only be seen to a limited extent. During the Middle Ages, it was possible to view Rothenburg ob der Tauber from the castle.

== Gallery ==
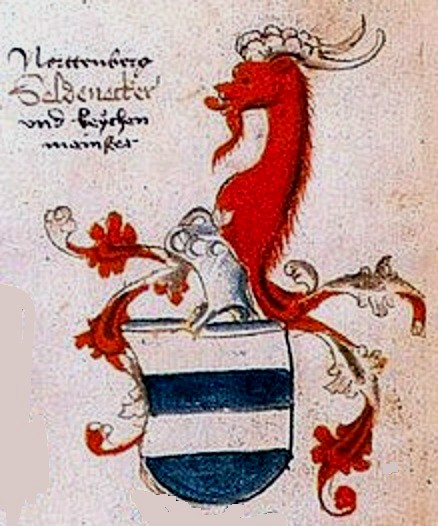
Coat of arms of the lords of Seldeneck

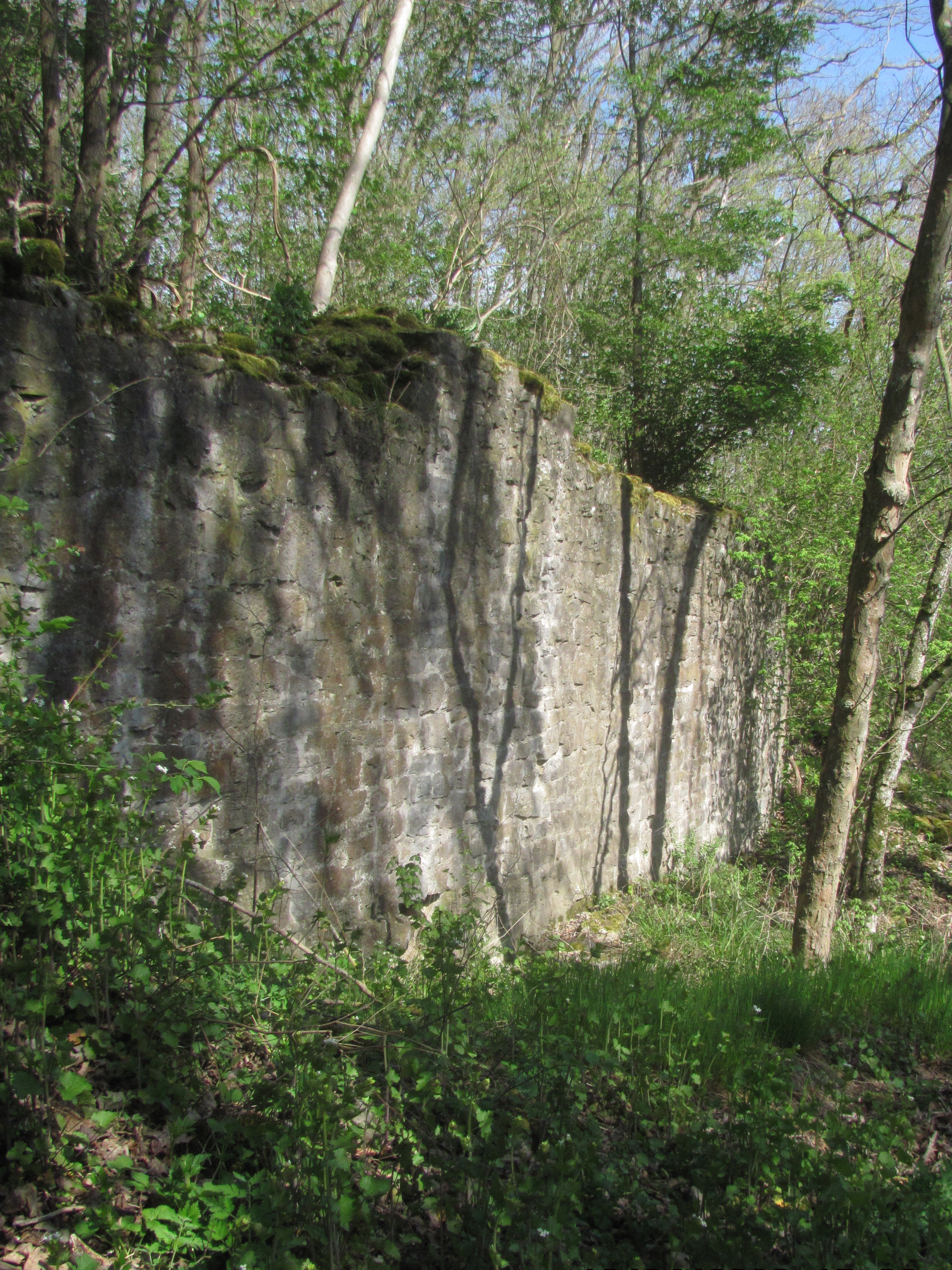
Remains of the castle wall to the south

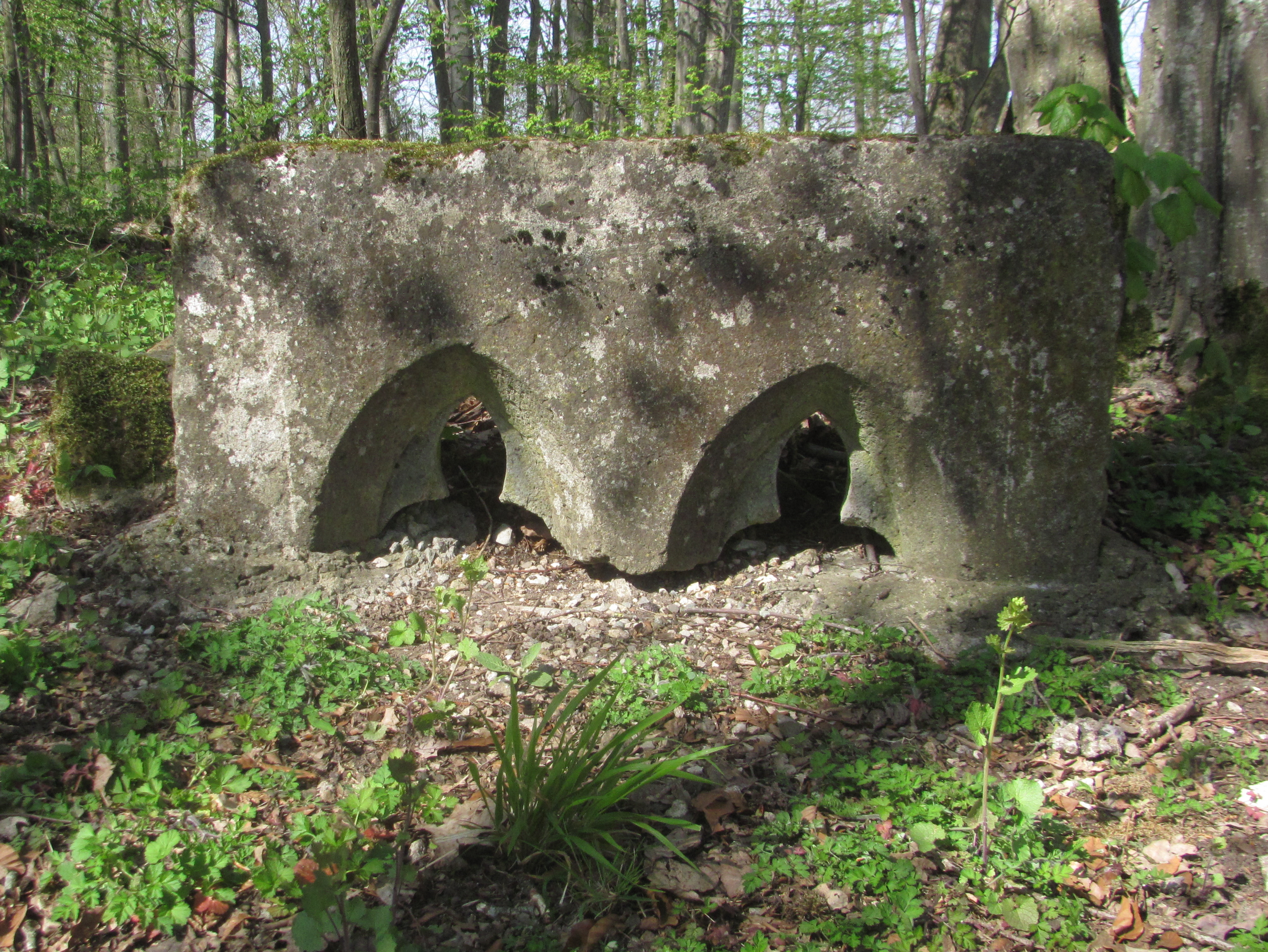
Stone blocks with remains of pointed arch windows

== Literature ==
- Karl Borchardt: Die geistlichen Institutionen der Reichsstadt Rothenburg o.d.T., 1988, p. 3ff.
- Die Herren von Seldeneck und ihre Stammburg. In: Zeitschrift des Historischen Vereins für das wirtembergische Franken, Vol 8, Year 1868–1870, S. 366–379
