= Steinach (b Rothenburg o. d. Tauber) station =

Railway station in Bavaria, Germany

Steinach (b Rothenb o d T)
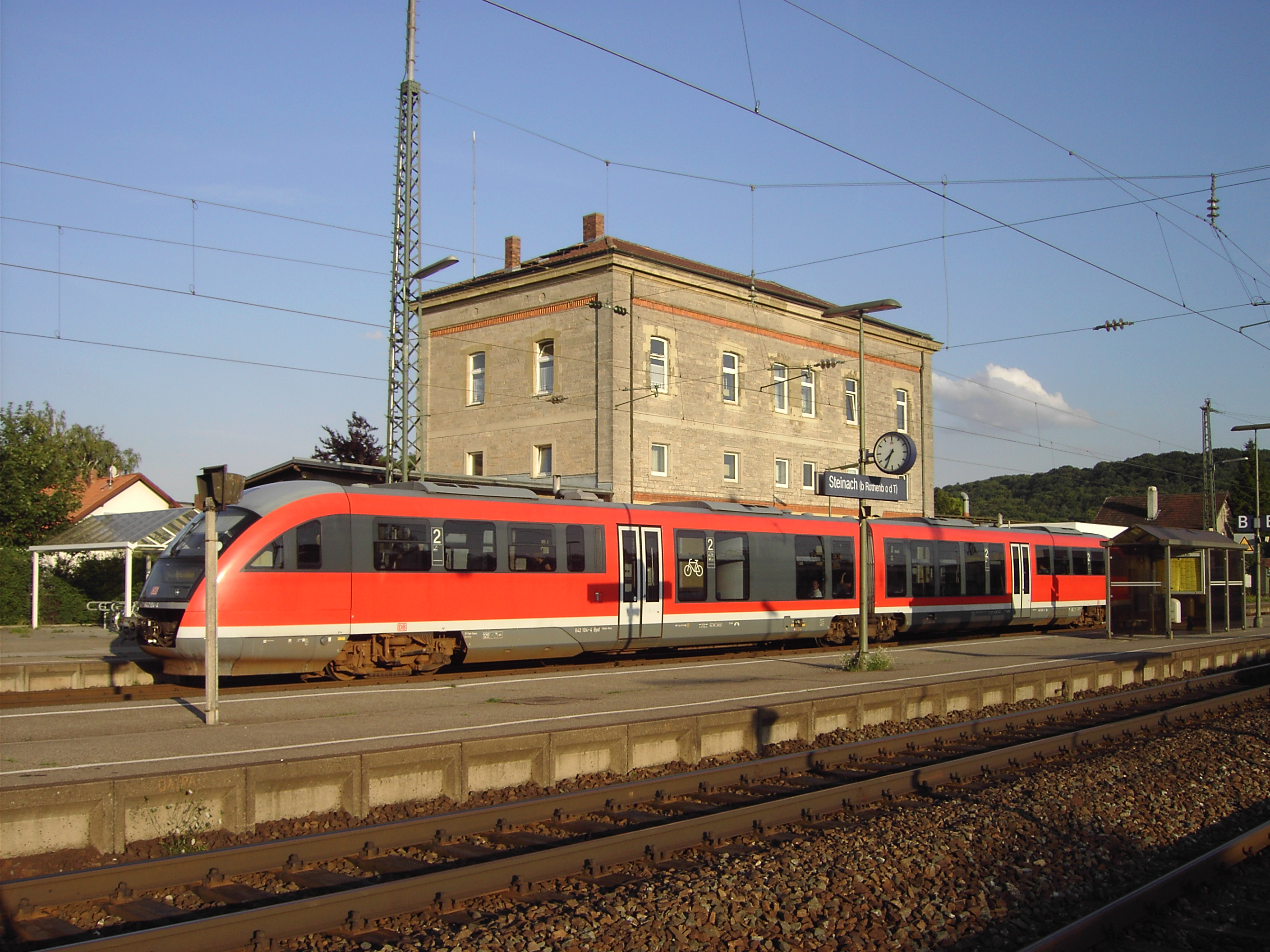
- A Regionalbahn train at the station in 2005

General information
- Location: Bahnhofstr. 21; Gallmersgarten, Bavaria; Germany
- Coordinates: 49°27′12″N 10°16′25″E
- Owner: DB Netz
- Operator: DB Station&Service
- Lines: Steinach bei Rothenburg–Bad Windsheim line; Treuchtlingen–Würzburg; Steinach bei Rothenburg–Dombühl line
- Distance: 83.1 km (51.6 mi) from Treuchtlingen
- Platforms: 2 island platforms; 1 side platform
- Tracks: 5
- Train operators: DB Fernverkehr; DB Regio Bayern

Construction
- Accessible: No

Other information
- Station code: 5981
- DS100 code: NSTN
- IBNR: 8000091
- Category: 4
- Fare zone: VGN: 1834 and 1843
- Website: stationsdatenbank.de; www.bahnhof.de

History
- Opened: 1865

Services
Preceding station	DB Regio Bayern	Following station
Terminus	RB 81	Burgbernheim towards Neustadt (Aisch)
Hartershofen towards Steinach	RB 82	Terminus
Preceding station		Following station
Uffenheim towards Würzburg Hbf	RE 80	Burgbernheim-Wildbad towards München Hbf
Location

Steinach (b Rothenburg ob der Tauber) station is a station on the Treuchtlingen–Würzburg, Steinach bei Rothenburg–Bad Windsheim and the Steinach bei Rothenburg–Dombühl lines. It is classified by Deutsche Bahn as a category 4 station and has five platform tracks. Steinach (b. Rothenburg od T.) is a district of the municipality of Gallmersgarten in the German state of Bavaria. The station is located in the network area of the Greater Nuremberg Transport Association (German: Verkehrsverbund Großraum Nürnberg). The station is not barrier-free.

== History ==
The Ansbach-Würzburg line existed before the station building, which was opened on 1 July 1864. The station was built from 1862 until the end of 1864 and became operational on 1865. The station building is a three-storey building with a hip roof and low wings, built of quarried stone with Haustein (a stone used in masonry in Germany) trimmings and dentils made of brick. The line to Rothenburg ob der Tauber was opened in November 1873. The line to Neustadt an der Aisch was opened in 1898.

== Services ==
Train class	Route	Frequency	Name
RB 80	Treuchtlingen – Ansbach – Steinach (b Rothenb) – Marktbreit – Ochsenfurt – Würzburg Hbf	60 min	Mainfrankenbahn
RB 81	Neustadt (Aisch) Bahnhof – Dottenheim – Bad Windsheim – Burgbernheim – Steinach (b Rothenb)	60 min	Aischgrund-Bahn
RB 82	Steinach (b Rothenb) – Hartershofen – Schweinsdorf – Rothenburg ob der Tauber	60 min	Rothenburg-Bahn

The Mainfrankenbahn services are operate with Alstom Coradia Continental (class 440) electric multiple units. The Aischgrund-Bahn and Rothenburg-Bahn services are operated with Alstom Coradia LINT 41 (class 648) diesel multiple units. All lines are operated by DB Regio Bayern.
