= Johann Döderlein =

Johann Döderlein may refer to:

- Johann Christoph Döderlein (1745–1792), German theologian
- Johann Christoph Wilhelm Ludwig Döderlein (1791–1863), German philologist, son of the above
- Johann Alexander Döderlein (1675–1745), German historian, philologist and numismatist
