= Ottenhofen-Bergel station =

Railway station in Germany

Ottenhofen-Bergel

General information
- Location: Landstrasse; Marktbergel, Bavaria; Germany
- Coordinates: 49°27′21″N 10°21′22″E
- Owner: DB Netz
- Operator: DB Station&Service
- Lines: Steinach bei Rothenburg–Bad Windsheim line (KBS 806)
- Distance: 6.4 km (4.0 mi) from Steinach (b Rothenburg o. d. Tauber)
- Platforms: 1 side platform
- Tracks: 1
- Train operators: DB Regio Bayern

Other information
- Station code: 4826
- DS100 code: NOBE
- IBNR: 8004724
- Category: 7
- Fare zone: VGN: 1833
- Website: www.bahnhof.de

Services
Preceding station	DB Regio Bayern	Following station
Burgbernheim towards Steinach (b Rothenburg o. d. Tauber)	RB 81	Illesheim towards Neustadt (Aisch)
Location

Ottenhofen-Bergel station is a railway station in the Ottenhofen district of the municipality of Marktbergel, located in the district of Neustadt (Aisch)-Bad Windsheim in Middle Franconia, Germany. The station is on the Steinach bei Rothenburg–Bad Windsheim line of Deutsche Bahn.
