= Advocatus =

Medieval officeholder

An advocatus, sometimes simply advocate, Vogt (German, pronounced [foːkt]), Fauth (Old High German) or avoué (French, pronounced [avwe]) was a type of medieval office holder, particularly important in the Holy Roman Empire, who was delegated some of the powers and functions of a major feudal lord, or for an institution such as an abbey. They typically had responsibility for the "comital" functions which defined the office of early medieval "counts", such as taxation, recruitment of militias, and maintaining law and order. This type of office could apply to specific agricultural lands, villages, castles, and even cities. In some regions, advocates came to be governors of large provinces, sometimes distinguished by terms such as Landvogt.

In different parts of medieval Europe, the term advocate developed different meanings, and other terms were also sometimes used to represent similar offices. For example, Anglo-Norman comital functions for larger districts were executed by vicomtes in Normandy, and sheriffs in England. In contrast, the advocatus or advocate as an officer of a court of law, which is still current in modern English, first appeared in the 12th and 13th centuries, concomitant with the rediscovery of Roman law. The common thread which connects the different meanings of advocate is that someone is called upon to perform a function for others.

While the term was eventually used to refer to many types of governorship and advocacy, one of the earliest and most important types of advocatus was the church advocate (advocatus ecclesiae). These were originally lay lords, who not only helped defend religious institutions from violence, but were also responsible for exercising the comital or lordly responsibilities within the church's lands, such as the management of courts which could inflict a death penalty. In return they received an income from the lands, and the positions of these office-holders often came to be seen as inheritable titles themselves, with their own feudal privileges connected to them.

== Nomenclature ==
The terms used in various European languages derive from a general Latin term for any person called upon (Latin: ad vocatus) to speak for another.

Apart from the English terms advocate and advowee, German terms are sometimes mentioned in English accounts of the Holy Roman Empire, and these include Vogt (German: [foːkt], from Old High German, also Voigt or Fauth; plural Vögte). The territory or area of responsibility of a Vogt is called a Vogtei (from [ad]vocatia).

Related terms include Dutch: (land-) voogd; Danish: foged; Norwegian: fogd; Swedish: fogde; Polish: wójt; Finnish: vouti; Lithuanian: vaitas; and Romanian: voit.

== Ecclesiastical advocates ==
Ecclesiastical advocates were specially bound to represent their lords by managing a court system, to protect law and order. They exercised civil jurisdiction in the domain of the church or monastery and were bound to protect the church with arms in the event of an actual assault. Finally, it was their duty to lead the men-at-arms in the name of the church or monastery, and to command them in time of war. In return for these services, the advocate received certain revenues from the possessions of the church in the form of supplies or services, which he could demand, or in the form of a lien on church property.

Such advocates were to be found even in Roman times; a Synod of Carthage decreed, in 401, that the emperor should be requested to provide, in conjunction with the bishops, defensores for the churches. There is evidence, moreover, for such defensores ecclesiæ in Italy, at the close of the fifth century, but Pope Gregory I confined the office to members of the clergy. It was the duty of these defensores to protect the poor and defend the rights and possessions of the church.

In the Frankish Kingdom, under the Merovingians, these lay representatives of the churches appeared as agentes, defensores and advocati. The concept of the Vogt was related to the Old German idea of the Munt, or guardian, but also included some ideas of physical defence and legal representation (whence the connection with advocatus or "advocate").

Under the Carolingians, the duties of the church advocate were enlarged and defined according to the principles of government which prevailed in the reign of Charlemagne; henceforward the advocatus ecclesiæ in the medieval sense. A Capitulary of about 790 ordained that the higher clergy, "for the sake of the church's honour, and the respect due to the priesthood" (pro ecclesiastico honore, et pro sacerdotum reverentia) should have advocates. Charlemagne, who obliged bishops, abbots and abbesses to maintain advocati, commanded to exercise great care in the choice of persons to fill the office; they must be judicious men, familiar with the law, and owning property in the—then still administrative—countship (Grafschaft). The churches, monasteries and canonries, as such, received advocates alike, who by degrees assumed the position above defined.

Under the Carolingians, it was made obligatory for bishops, abbots and abbesses to appoint such officials in every county where they held property. The office was not at first hereditary nor even for life, the advocatus being chosen, either by the abbot alone, or by the abbot and bishop concurrently with the count.

In the post-Carolingian period, it developed into a hereditary office, and was held by powerful nobles, who constantly endeavoured to enlarge their rights in connection with the church or the monastery. Conciliar decrees were passed as early as the ninth century to protect ecclesiastical institutions against the excessive claims of their advocates, who indeed became a burden to their ecclesiastical clients in many ways. They dealt with the possessions entrusted to them as with their own property, plundered the church estate, appropriated tithes and other revenues, and oppressed in many ways those whom they were appointed to protect.

The office, since it offered many advantages, was eagerly sought after. The excessive claims of the advocates gave rise to disputes between them and the churches or monasteries. The bishops and abbots, who found their rights curtailed, appealed to the Holy Roman Emperor and the Pope for protection. In the twelfth century, warnings were issued from Rome, restraining the high-handed actions of the advocates under pain of severe ecclesiastical penalties, which still did not put an end to all the abuses that prevailed. On occasions, emperors and princes exercised the office of an advocate, in which case they appointed deputy-advocates (subadvocati) to represent them.

From the time of Charlemagne, who had such officials appointed in ecclesiastical territories not directly under the control of his counts, the Vogt was a state functionary representing ecclesiastical dignitaries (such as bishops and abbots) or institutions in secular matters, and particularly before secular courts. Such representatives had been assigned to the church since late antiquity, as it was not to act for itself in worldly affairs. Therefore, in areas such as the territories of abbeys and bishoprics, which by virtue of their ecclesiastical status were free (or immune) from the secular government of the local count (Graf, in origin an administrative official in charge of a territory and reporting to the emperor), the Vogt fulfilled the function of a protective lordship, generally commanding the military contingents of such areas (Schirmvogtei). Beyond that, he administered the high justice instead of the count from the Vogt court (Landgericht, Vogtgericht or Blutgericht).

In private and family monasteries (see proprietary church), the proprietor himself often also held the office of Vogt, frequently retaining it after reform of the proprietorship (see also lay abbot).

The three-way struggle for control of the Vogtei of the more important abbacies, played out among the central monarchy, the Church and the territorial nobility, was well established as a prerogative of the nobility; the Hirsau formulary (1075) confirmed count Adalbert of Calw as hereditary advocate of the Abbey, an agreement so widely copied elsewhere in Germany that from the tenth century, the office developed into a hereditary possession of the higher nobility, who frequently exploited it as a way of extending their power and territories, and in some cases took for themselves the estates and assets of the church bodies for whose protection they were supposedly responsible. In Austria, the teaching of the Church that, according to canon law individuals were prohibited from exercising authority over Church property, was only accepted reluctantly by the nobles. The rights of advocacy were bought back by the thirteenth- and fourteenth-century abbeys in alliance with the Babenberg and early Habsburg dukes; the abolition of the Vogtei (Entvogtung) thereby exchanged local secular jurisdiction for the protective overlordship of the duke of Austria, sometimes by forging charters that the duke confirmed.

== Imperial advocates ==
The medieval Holy Roman Empire included what is now Germany, the Netherlands, Belgium, Luxembourg, Switzerland, Austria, Slovenia as well as parts of neighbouring regions. In these lands title of advocate (German Vogt, Dutch Voogd) was given not only to the advocati of churches and abbeys but also, from relatively early in the Middle Ages, to officials appointed by the Holy Roman Emperor to administer lands, castles and towns directly under his lordship. Such offices or jurisdictions were called for example a Vogtei in German, or a Voogdij in Dutch (Latin advocatia). During earlier periods the jurisdiction could also be called a comitatus, literally a countship, because these offices were similar to those of early medieval counts, and "counties" were not yet necessarily seen as geographically defined.

Terminology and customs evolved over time. In German for example, the delegated governor of a city could be called a Stadtvogt, while the governor or rural estates could be called a Landvogt. A Burgvogt was a castle administrator or castellan, responsible for the general running of a castle and also for exercising judicial powers there. In addition to governing lands, forts and cities, the term advocatus (or Vogt, Voogd etc.) could be applied to more specific administrative functions delegated by territorial rulers, equivalent to English reeves and bailiffs. However other terms were also sometimes used for these such as Dutch schout, and German Schultheiss.

Land administered by a Vogt could also be known locally as a Vogtland (terra advocatorum), a name still used to refer to a region, the Vogtland, that adjoins the principalities of Reuss and adjacent portions of Saxony, Prussia and Bavaria.

Imperial advocacies tended to become hereditary. Sometimes the emperor himself assumed the title of Vogt, in application to parts of his eminent domain. An imperial (Reichsvogt) was an officer of the emperor, who served as administrator and judge of a subdivision of royal property, or of a royal abbey. The seat of an imperial Reichsvogt was often at an imperial city.

When the imperial cities gained more independence, by the late Middle Ages, they took over their own governance. The land Vogt office of the Alsace, consisting of the ten imperial cities of the Décapole, was ceded to the king of France in 1648, but the cities remained part of the Holy Roman Empire. However, the cities were soon thereafter annexed by France.

Several small land Vögte continued to exist until the end of the Empire in 1806, mainly in the Swabian Circle.

In what is now the Netherlands, Belgium, and Luxembourg the Habsburg dynasty continued into modern times to rule through governors who used the title landvoogd or gouverneur-generaal, which was for example the main title of Margaret of Parma.

In modern Dutch, the word voogd is the primary word for the concept of legal guardian.

=== Old Swiss Confederacy ===
After leaving the Holy Roman Empire, the title of Landvogt continued to be used in the Old Swiss Confederacy in 1415. A Landvogt ruled a Landvogtei, either representing a sovereign canton, or acting on behalf of the Confederacy, or a subset thereof, administering a condominium (Gemeine Herrschaft) shared between several cantons. In the case of condominiums, the cantons took turns in appointing a Landvogt for a period of two years.

In exceptional cases, the population of the Landvogtei was allowed to elect their own Landvogt. This concerned Oberhasli in particular, which was nominally a subject territory of Bern, but enjoyed a special status as a military ally. The office of Landvogt was abolished in 1798, with the foundation of the Helvetic Republic.

Although the title of Duke of Burgundy was extinguished by the French king after the annexation of its ancestral lands in 1477, the Habsburg kings of Spain and archdukes of Austria continued to use the title to refer to their realms in the Netherlands.

== Outside the empire ==
In surrounding parts of Europe the original Frankish church advocacies, and the later imperial advocacies were also influential, and evolved in various ways.

=== France ===
In France, the advocati, known as avoués, were of two types. The first included secular lords, who held the advocateship (avouerie) of an abbey or abbeys, rather as an office than a fief, though they were indemnified for the protection they afforded by a domain and preach revenues granted by the abbey: thus the duke of Normandy was advocatus of nearly all the abbeys in the duchy. The second class included the petty lords who held their advocateships as hereditary fiefs and often as their sole means of subsistence. An abbey's avoué, of this class, corresponded to a bishop's vidame. Their function was generally to represent the abbot in his capacity as feudal lord, act as his representative in the courts of his superior, exercise secular justice in the abbot's name in the abbatial court, and lead the retainers of the abbey to battle under the banner of the patron saint.

The advocatus ecclesiae was also known as a custos or adjutator in the 10th and 11th centuries. Initially, only counts and dukes were appointed advocati, but by the end of the 11th century the title was being bestowed on mere castellans. The monks usually consulted their advocate before electing a new abbot, giving the advocate influence over the selection. When a nobleman founded or reformed a monastery, he usually became its advocate. In the 12th century, the office of the advocate was on the decline - a result of the Gregorian reforms. The Cistercian Order, for example, never allowed lay advocates.

=== England ===
In England, the word advocatus was never used to denote a hereditary representative of an abbot; but in some of the larger abbeys there were hereditary stewards whose functions and privileges were not dissimilar to those of the continental advocati. Instead, the word advocatus, or more commonly avowee, was in constant use in England to denote the patron of an ecclesiastical benefice, whose sole right of any importance was a hereditary one of presenting a parson to the bishop for institution. In this way the hereditary right of presentation to a benefice came to be called in English an advowson (Latin: advocatio).

=== Poland ===
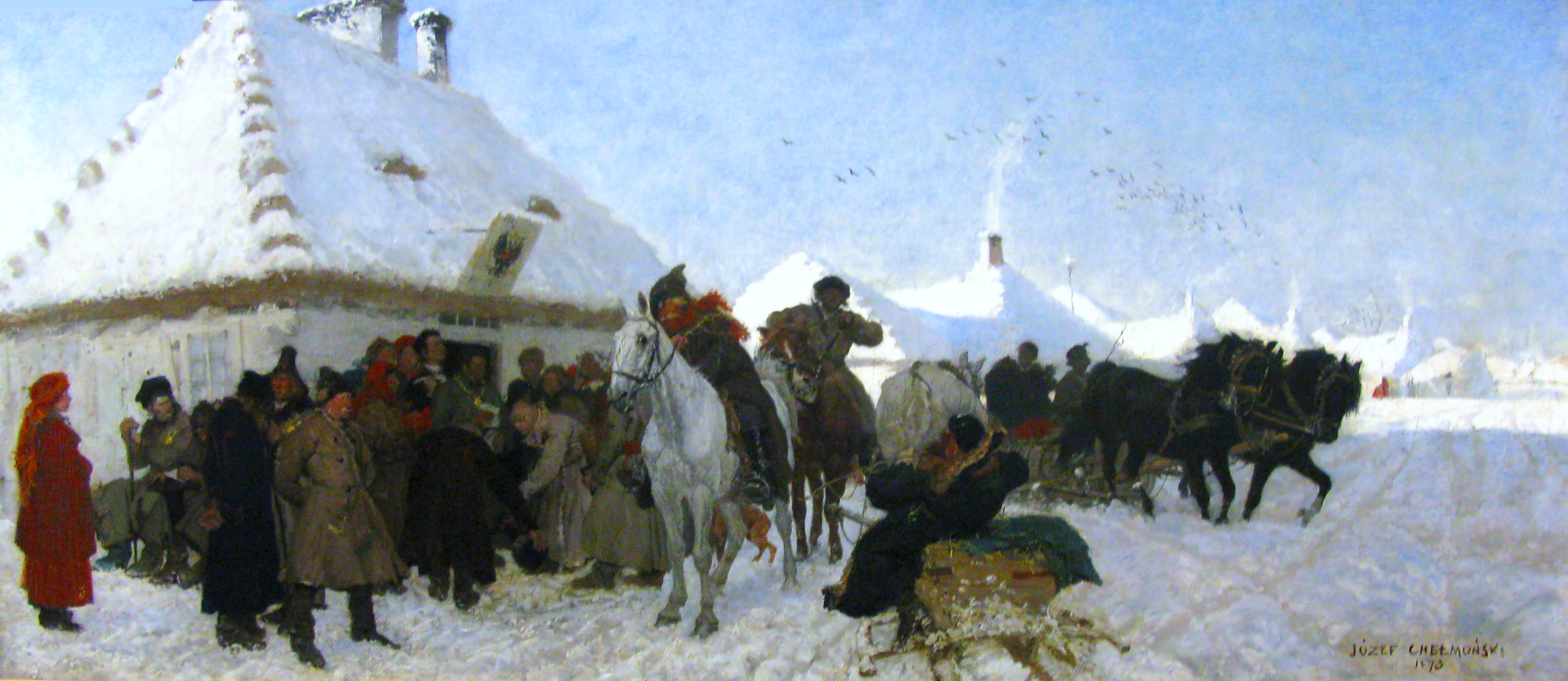
Trial before the wójt by Józef Chełmoński (1873), National Museum in Warsaw

In medieval Poland, a wójt was the hereditary head of a town (under the overlordship of the town's owner – the king, church, or noble).

In modern Poland, a wójt is the elected head of a rural gmina, whereas heads of urban gminas are called burmistrz (burgomaster), or president.

=== Denmark ===
In Danish, the word foged carries different connotations, all pertaining to guarding or keeping watch over something. In modern Danish law, the fogedret (vogt court) administers the forcible enforcement and execution of judgments or other valid legal claims.

=== Finland ===
The local bailiff (distrainer) is called kihlakunnanvouti, where kihlakunta (hundred) is a local judicial district. Their duty is to enforce the financial judgements of the local courts. In practice, the vouti leads a team of assistant distrainers who process most distrainments/garnishments.

== See also ==
- Fogd
- Vidame
- Schultheiß
