= Burgbernheim station =

Railway station in Germany

Burgbernheim

General information
- Location: Am unteren Bahnhof 3 Burgbernheim, Bavaria; Germany
- Coordinates: 49°27′15″N 10°19′13″E
- Owner: DB Netz
- Operator: DB Station&Service
- Lines: Steinach bei Rothenburg–Bad Windsheim line (KBS 806)
- Distance: 3.7 km (2.3 mi) from Steinach (b Rothenburg o. d. Tauber)
- Platforms: 1 side platform
- Tracks: 1
- Train operators: DB Regio Bayern

Other information
- Station code: 980
- DS100 code: NBUM
- IBNR: 8001277
- Category: 7
- Fare zone: VGN: 1834
- Website: www.bahnhof.de

Services
Preceding station	DB Regio Bayern	Following station
Steinach (b Rothenburg o. d. Tauber) Terminus	RB 81	Ottenhofen-Bergel towards Neustadt (Aisch)
Location

Burgbernheim station is a railway station in the municipality of Burgbernheim, located in the district of Neustadt (Aisch)-Bad Windsheim in Middle Franconia, Germany. The station is on the Steinach bei Rothenburg–Bad Windsheim line of Deutsche Bahn.
