= Ludwig Döderlein =

Ludwig Döderlein may refer to:

- Johann Christoph Wilhelm Ludwig Döderlein (1791–1863), German philologist
- Ludwig Heinrich Philipp Döderlein (1855–1936), German zoologist and paleontogist
