= Illesheim =

- Municipality
- Coat of arms

- Location of Illesheim within Neustadt a.d.Aisch-Bad Windsheim district
- Interactive map of Illesheim
- Location within Germany Location within Bavaria
- Coordinates: 49°28′N 10°23′E
- Country: Germany
- State: Bavaria
- Admin. region: Mittelfranken
- District: Neustadt a.d.Aisch-Bad Windsheim
- Municipal assoc.: Burgbernheim
- Subdivisions: 4 Ortsteile

Government
  - Mayor (2020–26): Roland Scheibenberger

Area
  - Total: 21.42 km^{2} (8.27 sq mi)
- Elevation: 321 m (1,053 ft)

Population (2025-12-31)
  - Total: 934
  - Density: 43.6/km^{2} (113/sq mi)
- Time zone: UTC+01:00 (CET)
  - Summer (DST): UTC+02:00 (CEST)
- Postal codes: 91471
- Dialling codes: 09841
- Vehicle registration: NEA
- Website: www.illesheim.de

Illesheim (German pronunciation: [ˈɪləshaɪm], also known locally as Illesa), founded 1283 AD, is a municipality in the district of Neustadt (Aisch)-Bad Windsheim in Bavaria in Germany. The earliest leader affiliated with Illesheim's foundation was Götz von Berlichingen, known as "the Knight with the Iron Hand". It lies 6 kilometers west of Bad Windsheim and 11 kilometers east of the A7 motorway.

Illesheim has one train station, a stop on the Regionalbahn system. Its Rathaus (townhall) is open Wednesday afternoons and has some interesting historical items. This small town adjoins the northwestern edge of the U.S. Army's Storck Barracks and the Illesheim AAF, a U.S. Army helicopter airfield. The airfield previously belonged to the Luftwaffe until its capture in 1945.

Illesheim is primarily an agricultural town. The even smaller hamlet of Urfersheim sits to its southeast, adjoining the opposite side of the airfield.

On Illesheim's crest (in German, Wappen), the Wheel represents Illesheim at the center with the five wheel spokes pointing toward other smaller neighboring communities linked to the town Illesheim. The knife above represents Saint Bartholomew, who is the patron saint for the church in neighboring Urfersheim. The cross represents Saint Gumbertus, the patron saint for the church in the hamlet of Westheim (southeast of Urfersheim).

== Mayor ==
The mayor of Illesheim is Roland Scheibenberger, elected in March 2020.

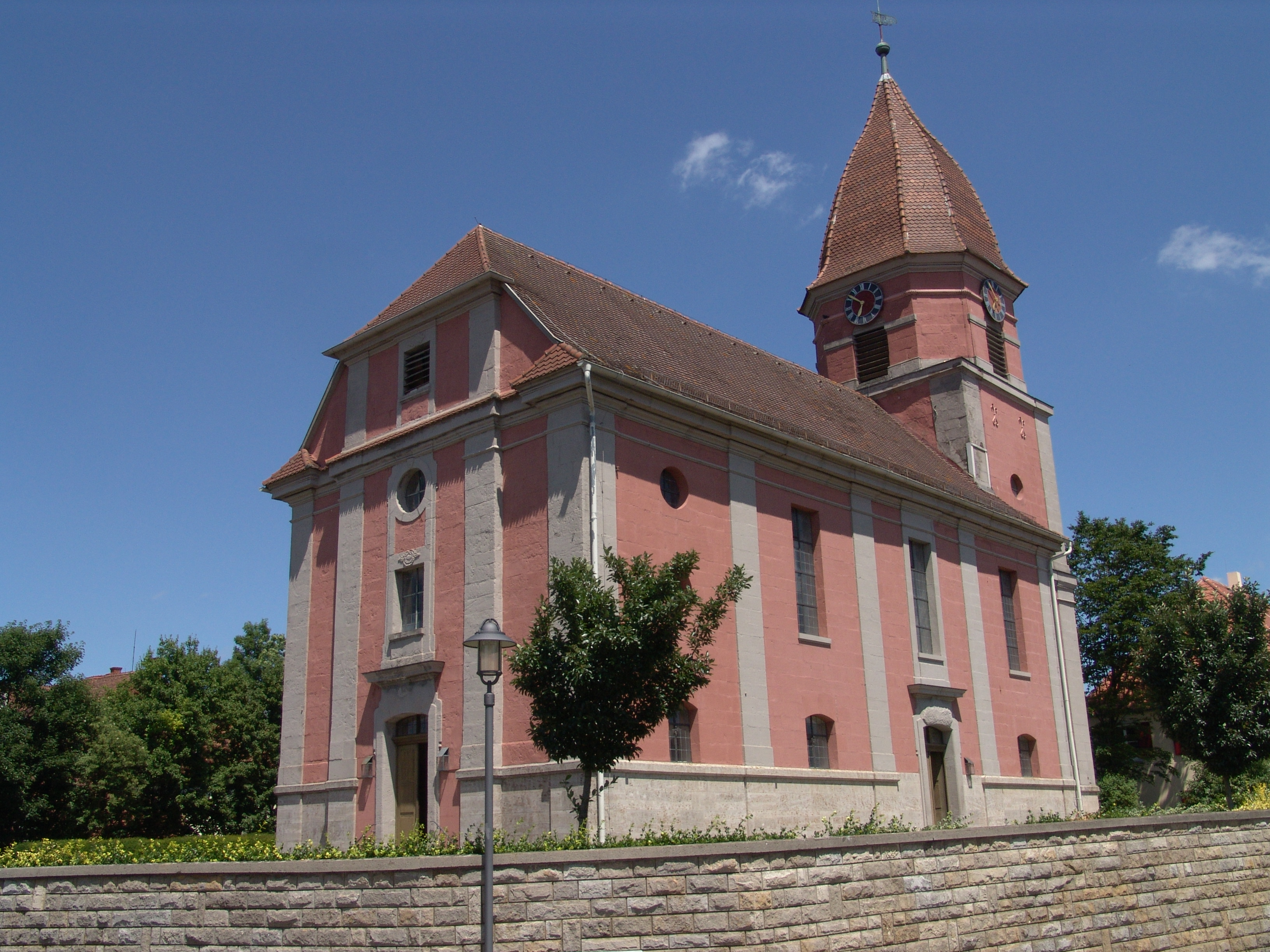
Illesheim St. Maria and Wendel
