= Nevio Passaro =

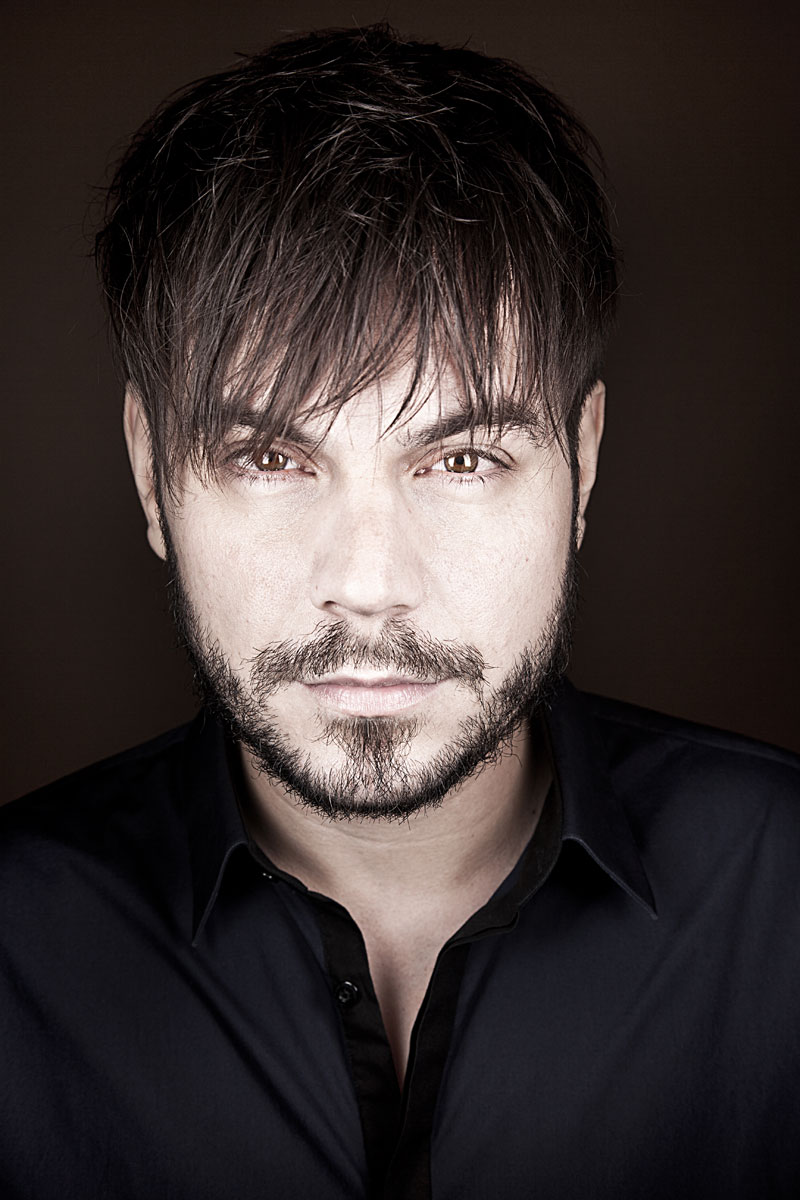

Background information
- Born: 11 May 1980 (age 46)
- Origin: Bad Windsheim, Germany
- Genres: Pop
- Occupations: singer, songwriter, producer, interpreter
- Instruments: vocals, piano, guitar
- Years active: 1999–present
- Labels: Universal Music Group, Ariola, Studio Uno Records
- Website: neviopassaro.com

Nevio Passaro (born 11 May 1980, in Bad Windsheim) is a German–Italian singer, songwriter and producer, who uses the Italian, German and English language for his self-composed music.

== Biography ==
Nevio Passaro was raised in Neustadt an der Aisch, a city in the south of Germany. Already as a small child he was very interested in music, not in the least because his mother, a music teacher, taught him how to play the piano in an early stage of his life. In the years growing up, he taught himself how to play the piano and the guitar.

From 2000 to 2005 he studied "Modern foreign languages for interpreters and translators" at the University of Bologna, situated in Forlì. In December 2006 he graduated as simultaneous-interpreter and translator in Italian, German, English and French.

Since 2007 he lives and works in Berlin, where he owns "Studio Uno", an Artist Management & Recording Studio.

== Career ==
Already in 1999 Nevio Passaro released his first single "La mia parola" with BMG Ariola (RCA). After competing in a German talent show and till today he has numerous live-performances through all of (Germany), but also in Austria, Luxembourg, Italy, Slovakia, Switzerland and South Africa. On 8 August 2006 he signed a record deal with Universal Music. His first self-composed single "Amore per sempre" was released on 19 January 2007 and stormed to the second place in the German single charts. "Nevio", his first album, was released on 16 February 2007, went to fifth place in the German album charts and later reached the gold status.

On 3 May 2007 Nevio Passaro got the Comet (a German music prize) in the category "Best Newcomer". He was also nominated in the category "Best Artist". He also won the Bavarian Popkomm-Musiklöwe as "Shootingstar 2007". The tour following his album "Nevio", brought him within 3 weeks to 17 German and Austrian cities.

Nevio Passaro was also nominated for the Echo (most important German music prize) in the category "Nachwuchspreis der Deutschen Phonoakademie" as best newcomer in 2008.

His second studio album "Due" was released in Germany on 19 September 2008. The first single of this album, "Sento", was released on 5 September 2009. A few days later Nevio had an unplugged concert at the Konzerthaus Dortmund, where he introduced his new album. The tour following his album "Due" took place in January and February in Germany.

On 27 February 2009 Nevio Passaro released a musicvideo to his single "Non Ti Aspettavo (Libertà)", a duet with the Australian singer Gabriella Cilmi, which was released in April 2009. On the album "Due" is also another duet (Gli ultimi brividi) with the Italian singer Giorgia, winner of the famous Sanremo festival.

The presentation of Nevio Passaros third album, "Berlino", took place on 7 April 2011 in Berlin. The official release of this album was on 29 July 2011, but on 20 May 2011 Nevio released a Fan-Edition of this album. Nevio composed the lyrics and music himself in his own Recording Studio. The tour following his album "Berlino" was in September and October 2011 and went through 15 German cities, ending with a concert in the Austrian capital Vienna.

In 2012 Nevio Passaro participated in the Sat.1-Music-Game-Show The Winner is., in which he won his category "Professionals". In the same year Nevio visited the German cities Cologne, Hamburg and Berlin on his "Dal vivo"-tour.

The single "Castingstar" was released on 28 March 2014. "Castingstar" is a single, which will lead to Nevio Passaros fourth studio album "Nordsüdlich von hier", on which he is currently working. The songs on this album will all be in the German language.

At the annual music fair Frankfurt on 18 April 2015 Nevio Passaro received the "Musik-Fachaward" for "Best video 2015" ("Castingstar") and also in the category "German Act 2015". On 1 May 2015 Nevio opened the German pavilion of the Expo 2015 in Milan with 2 live-concerts and played at the "Festival der Einheit", which celebrates the 25th anniversary of the German union, together with other famous German music acts at the big stage at the Brandenburg Gate in front of 1 Million people on 3 October 2015

The most recent single "Piccolo re (Make love not war)", a duet with the Italian tenor Domenico Re, was released on 26 November 2015 and is also found on the re-release of the album "Berlino" ("Berlino reloaded") which is in on-line stores since 11 December 2015. All revenues from this single go, as the half of the revenues from the album, directly to help refugees.

From 5 to 11 May 2016 Nevio Passaro joined this years trip to Cape Town, South Africa, for the HOPE Cape Town project as ambassador, together with Fidei donum-priest Stefan Hippler and the initiator of the annually HOPE Gala in Dresden, (Germany), Viola Klein. As part of his activity as ambassador he visited, among others, a children's hospital, assisted by the HOPE Cape Town Foundation, as well as various townships and schools. Furthermore, Nevio Passaro had musical performances both on the South African TV program "Expresso Show" on 6 May and during the "Ball of HOPE " on 7 May 2016.

His "Nordsüdlich von hier"-Tour 2017 led Nevio Passaro to different European countries. It started in Castelnuovo del Garda (Italy) on 1 September 2017, followed by some concerts in (Germany) and in the Slovak Komárno. The final concert took place in the German Neu Wulmstorf on 18 November 2017, where as well national musicians like Ralf Gustke und Rainer Scheithauer, as the international well known Chris Thompson (English musician) (Manfred Mann's Earth Band, The Alan Parsons Project) also stood on stage. The tour will be continued in 2018.

For the 5th spring ball in support of the foundation "Palmengarten" and the botanical gardens Frankfurt on 24 February 2018 Nevio Passaro and his agency "Studio Uno" took over the musical direction. In addition to his band, he brought Ann Sophie on stage of the "Gesellschaftshaus Palmengarten".

The single "Alles in allem" was released on 6 July 2018 as the first single of Nevio Passaro's German album "Nordsüdlich von hier".

The second single of the forthcoming album was released on 1 March 2019 and is called "Viel mehr", followed by the third single "Hier am Meer" on 10 October 2019.

Between January 14 and 27, 2020, Nevio Passaro accompanied the British band FRONTM3N (Mick Wilson - 10cc, Peter Howarth - The Hollies, Pete Lincoln - The Sweet, Sailor (band)) together with Eric Martin (musician) (Mr. Big (American band) for a total of five concerts of the "Up Close" tour in the German cities of Cologne, Magdeburg, Berlin, Halle (Saale) and Dresden.

On April 24, 2020, another German single ("Vielleicht") was released, in which Nevio Passaro thematizes the effects of the COVID-19 pandemic on Society.

== Discography ==
=== Albums ===
Title	Album details	Peak chart positions			Certifications
Title	Album details	GER	AUT	SWI	Certifications
Nevio	Released: 16 February 2007; Label: Universal; Formats: CD, digital download	5	7	11	GER: Gold
Nevio - Viva la Musica Edition	Released: 5 October 2007; Label: Universal; Formats: CD, digital download	–	–	–	
Due	Released: 19 September 2008; Label: Universal; Formats: CD, digital download	26	24	–	
Berlino	Released: 29 July 2011; Label: Exzess Berlin; Formats: CD, digital download	–	–	–	
Berlino reloaded	Released: 11 December 2015; Label: Studio Uno Records; Formats: digital download	–	–	–	

=== Singles ===
Released	Single	Peak chart positions			Certifications	Album
Released	Single	GER	AUT	SWI	Certifications	Album
26 March 1999	"La Mia Parola"	–	–	–		–
19 January 2007	"Amore per Sempre"	2	10	26		Nevio
18 May 2007	"Run Away"	28	19	–		Nevio
21 September 2007	"Firenze / Giulia"	35	23	–		Nevio – Viva la Musica Edition
5 September 2008	"Sento"	35	17	–		Due
10 April 2009	"Non Ti Aspettavo (Libertà)" (featuring Gabriella Cilmi)	–	–	–		Due
6 May 2011	"Oraieridomani"	–	–	–		Berlino
28 March 2014	"Castingstar"	–	–	–		–
26 November 2015	"Piccolo re (Make love not war)" (featuring Domenico Re)	–	–	–		Berlino reloaded
6 July 2018	"Alles in allem"	–	–	–		Nordsüdlich von hier
1 March 2019	"Viel mehr"	–	–	–		Nordsüdlich von hier
10 October 2019	"Hier am Meer"	–	–	–		Nordsüdlich von hier
24 April 2020	"Vielleicht"	–	–	–		–

== Awards ==
- 2007: Comet for Best Newcomer
- 2007: Comet Nomination for Best Artist national
- 2007: Gold record for album Nevio (in Germany)
- 2007: Bayerischer Musiklöwe for Best Newcomer
- 2008: Nomination for Bravo Otto
- 2008: Nomination for Echo in category "Nachwuchspreis der Deutschen Phonoakademie“
- 2015: www.drums.de Musik-Fachaward 2015 in category "Best Video"
- 2015: www.drums.de Musik-Fachaward 2015 in category "German Act"
