= Astheim Charterhouse =

Former monastery in Bavaria, Germany

Coordinates: 49.8629°N 10.2169°E

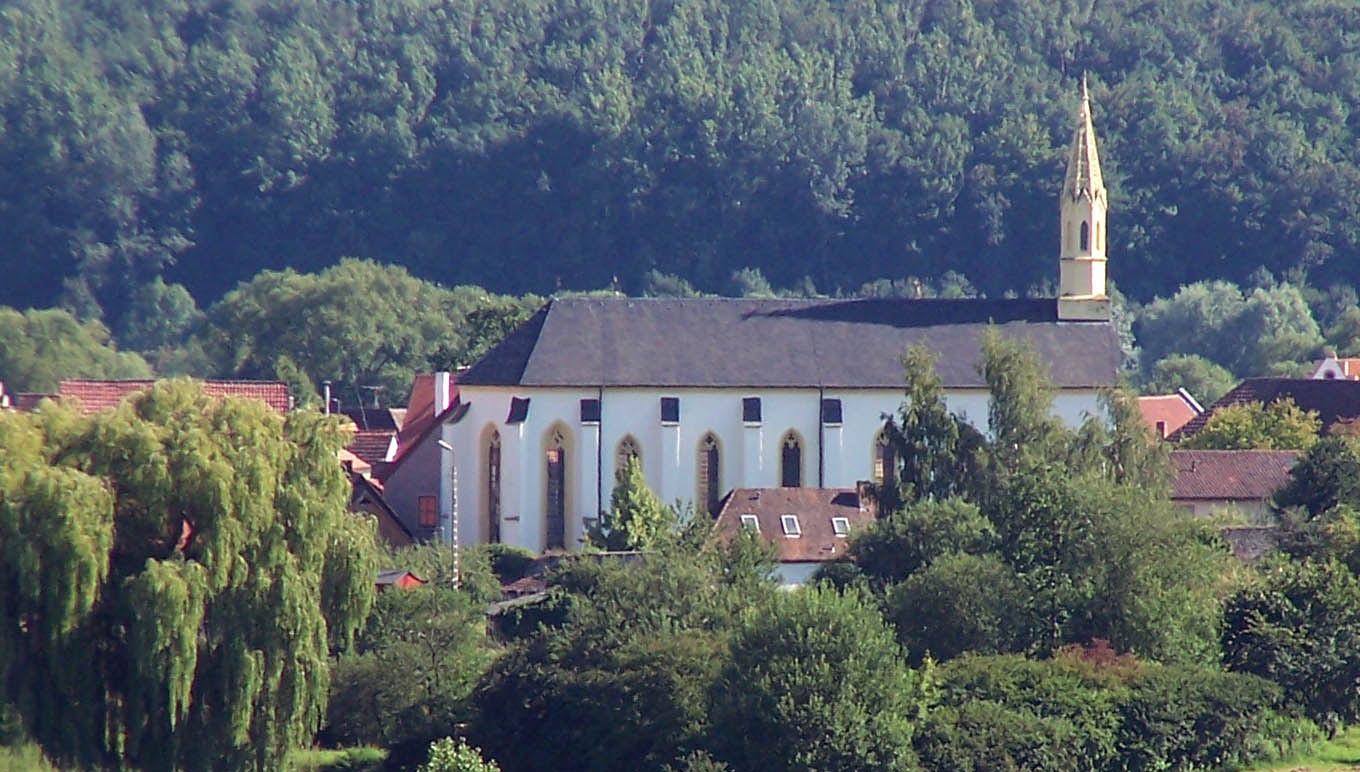
Astheim

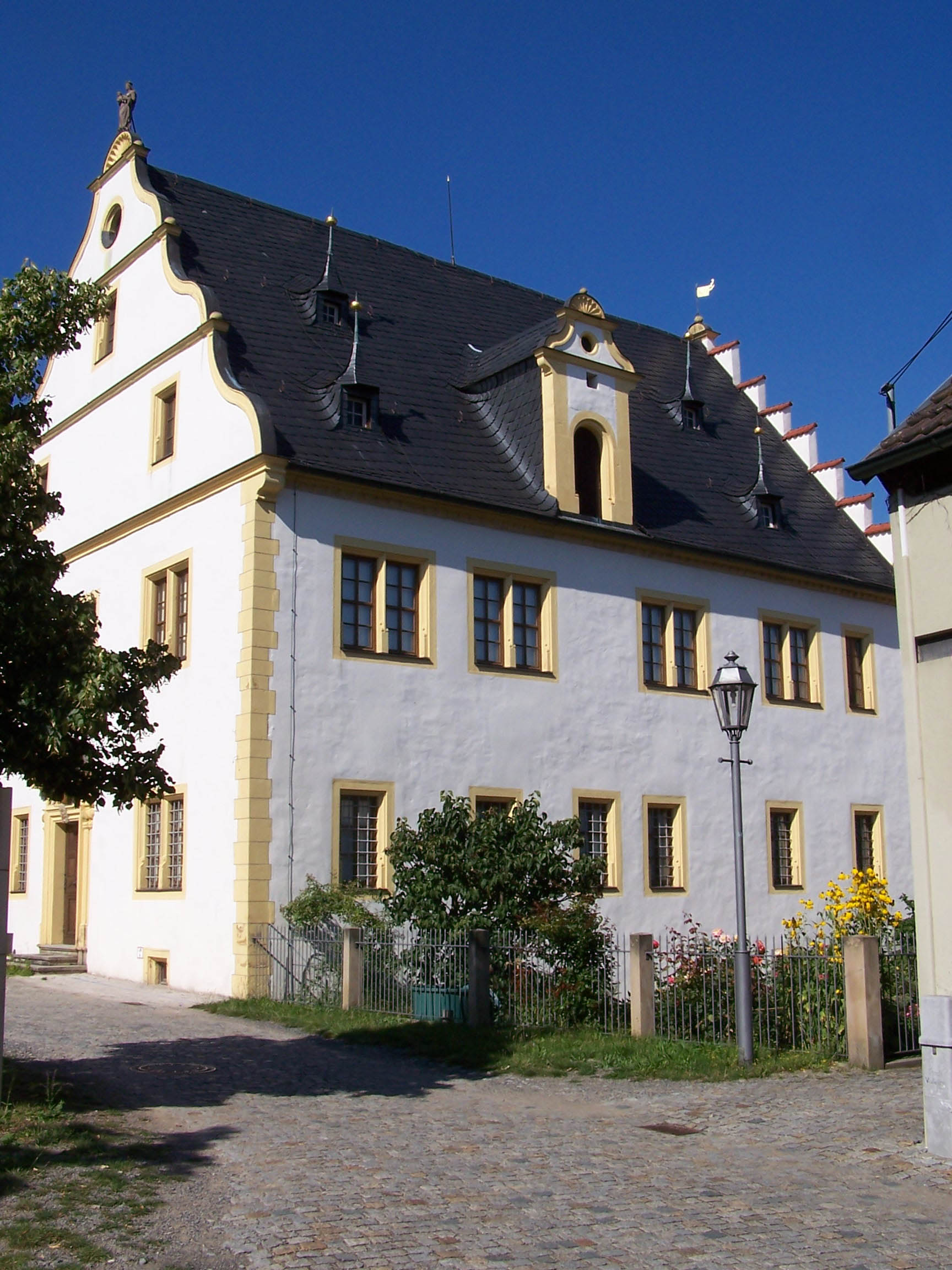
Astheim

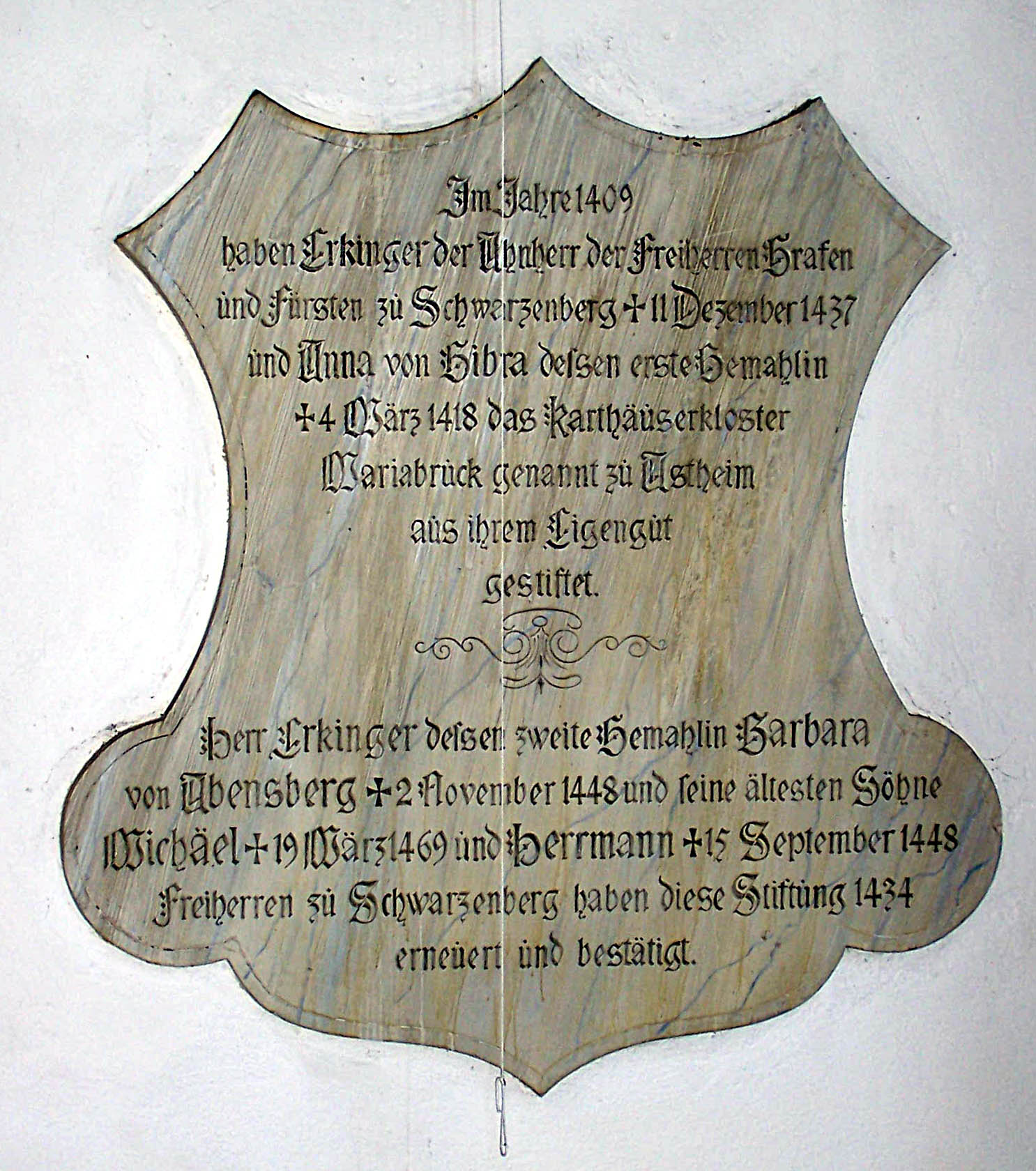
Plaque in the interior of the chapel explaining the establishment

Astheim Charterhouse, also known as Marienbrück Charterhouse (German: Kloster or Kartause Astheim, also Kartause Marienbrück; Latin: Pons Mariae), was a Carthusian monastery, or charterhouse, in Astheim near Volkach in Kitzingen, Bavaria, Germany.

== History ==
The charterhouse was founded on June 2, 1409, by Erkinger von Seinsheim and his first wife, Anna von Bibra, as a place of burial for their family, a function which the monastery served for several centuries for Erkinger's descendants, the Barons and later Princes von Schwarzenberg. Erkinger, his second wife Barbara von Abensberg, and Anna's sons Michael and Hermann renewed and confirmed the charterhouse in 1434.

It was settled by Carthusian monks from Cologne Charterhouse. It was dissolved in 1803 in the secularisation of Bavaria.

In 1804 the buildings passed into the ownership of the Princes of Schwarzenberg, descendants of the founder. Although most buildings were demolished, the church, built 1603–09, and the prior's lodging with a chapel of St. John (1583) remain extant. The church contains a Late Baroque high altar of 1723–24 with an altarpiece depicting Saint Bruno of Cologne (founder of the Carthusian Order) and the Virgin Mary by Oswald Onghers, and choir stalls of 1606, with Baroque fittings added in 1724.

Today the surviving buildings on the site accommodate the archives of the town of Volkach and from 1999 a museum, the Kartausenmuseum Astheim, run by the Diocese of Würzburg, specialising in Christian graphic art, on which theme it has about 600 exhibits.

== Sources/ External links ==
- Klöster in Bayern: Astheim - Kartäuser am Main (in German)
- Website of the Diocese of Würzburg: Kartausenmuseum Astheim (in German)
- Website of Volkach: Kartausenmuseum Astheim (in German)
