= Treuchtlingen–Würzburg railway =

Railway line in Germany

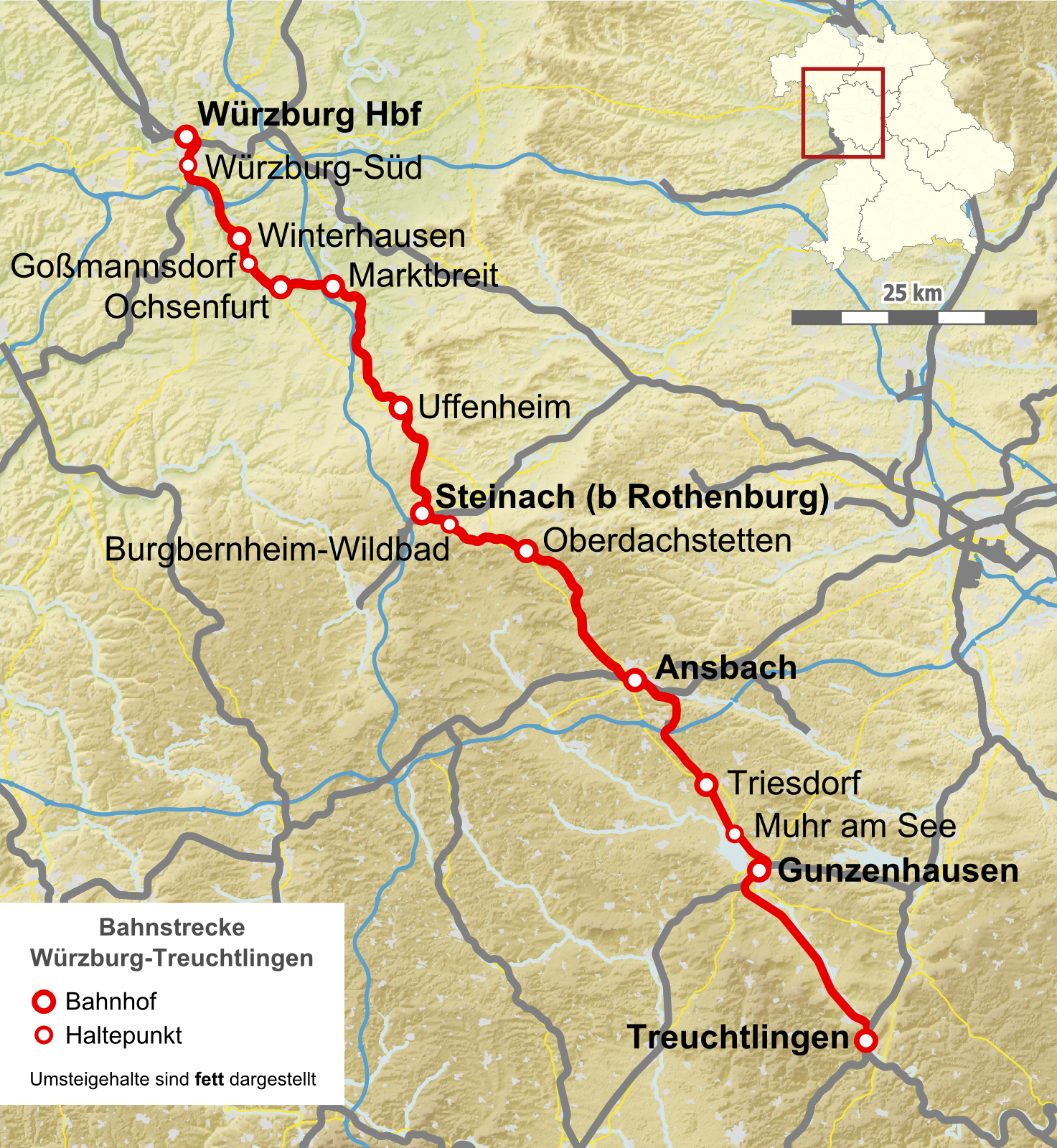

Overview
- Native name: Bahnstrecke Treuchtlingen-Würzburg
- Status: Operational
- Owner: DB InfraGO
- Line number: 5321
- Locale: Bavaria, Germany
- Termini: Treuchtlingen; Würzburg Hbf
- Stations: 15

Service
- Type: Heavy rail, Passenger/freight rail Regional rail, Intercity rail
- Route number: 920
- Operator(s): Deutsche Bahn, Arverio

History
- Opened: Stages between 1859 and 1869

Technical
- Line length: 140.2 km (87.1 mi)
- Number of tracks: Double track
- Track gauge: 1,435 mm (4 ft 8 1/2 in) standard gauge
- Electrification: 15 kV/16.7 Hz AC overhead catenary
- Operating speed: 160 km/h (99 mph) (maximum)
- Signalling: PZB

The Treuchtlingen–Würzburg railway is a 140 km long main line in the northwest of the German state of Bavaria. It runs from Treuchtlingen in southern Middle Franconia through Gunzenhausen, Ansbach, Steinach (b Rothenb), Marktbreit and Ochsenfurt to the capital of Lower Franconia, Würzburg. It was opened in three separate sections and is one of the oldest lines in Germany.

== History ==
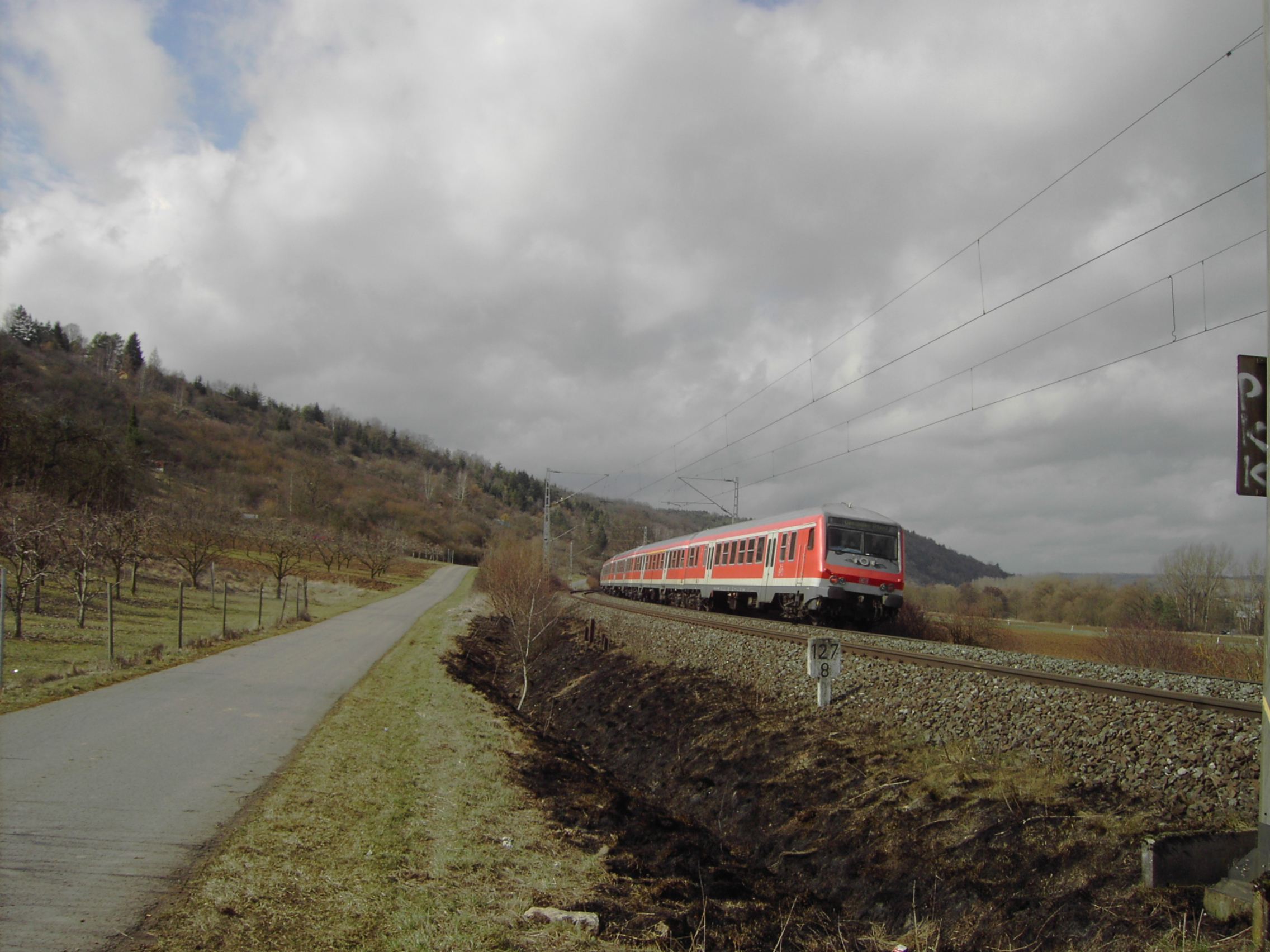
A Treuchtlingen–Gemünden (Main) Regionalbahn service between Winterhausen and Heidingsfeld

The line was built in three sections:

1. the line from Ansbach to Gunzenhausen was opened on 1 July 1859,
2. the line from Würzburg to Ansbach was opened on 1 July 1864 and
3. the line from Gunzenhausen to Treuchtlingen was opened on 2 October 1869.

Ansbach initially had no connection with the Ludwig South-North Railway, completed between Nuremberg and Augsburg in 1849. It decided to finance a railway to Gunzenhausen. This was the third railway in Bavaria operated under lease by the Royal Bavarian State Railways after the Neuenmarkt–Bayreuth (1853) and Pasing–Starnberg (1854) railways.

The rest of the Treuchtlingen–Würzburg line was only completed after the enactment of the Railway Construction Act of 1861. The line was completed on 2 October 1869 with the Gunzenhausen–Treuchtlingen section, which was built as the northern part of the Altmühl Railway, which runs from Treuchtlingen through the Altmühl valley through Eichstätt to Ingolstadt.

The continuous double-track line has been electrified since 15 March 1965. In 1978, as part of a pilot project, the operation of passenger services ended at a total of 15 stations, being replaced by bus services. Freight operation ended at many stations in 1993.

On the evening of 18 July 2016, there was an attack on a regional train on the section between Ochsenfurt and Würzburg in which a 17-year-old Afghan refugee attacked passengers with an ax and a stabbing weapon and caused serious injuries to some of them. The perpetrator was shot by special forces during his attempted escape in the Würzburg district of Heidingsfeld. It is assumed that there may be an Islamist connection.

== Route ==
The route is 140 km long and once had 29 stations, of which 15 are still served. The route is double track throughout and has been fully electrified since 15 March 1965.

=== Transport associations ===
Regional transport services on the northern section from Würzburg to Marktbreit are organised by the Verkehrsverbund Mainfranken (Mainfranken Transport Association, VVM), established in 2004. From Uffenheim to Treuchtlingen they are organised by the Verkehrsverbund Großraum Nürnberg (Greater Nuremberg Transport Association, VGN)

== Operations ==
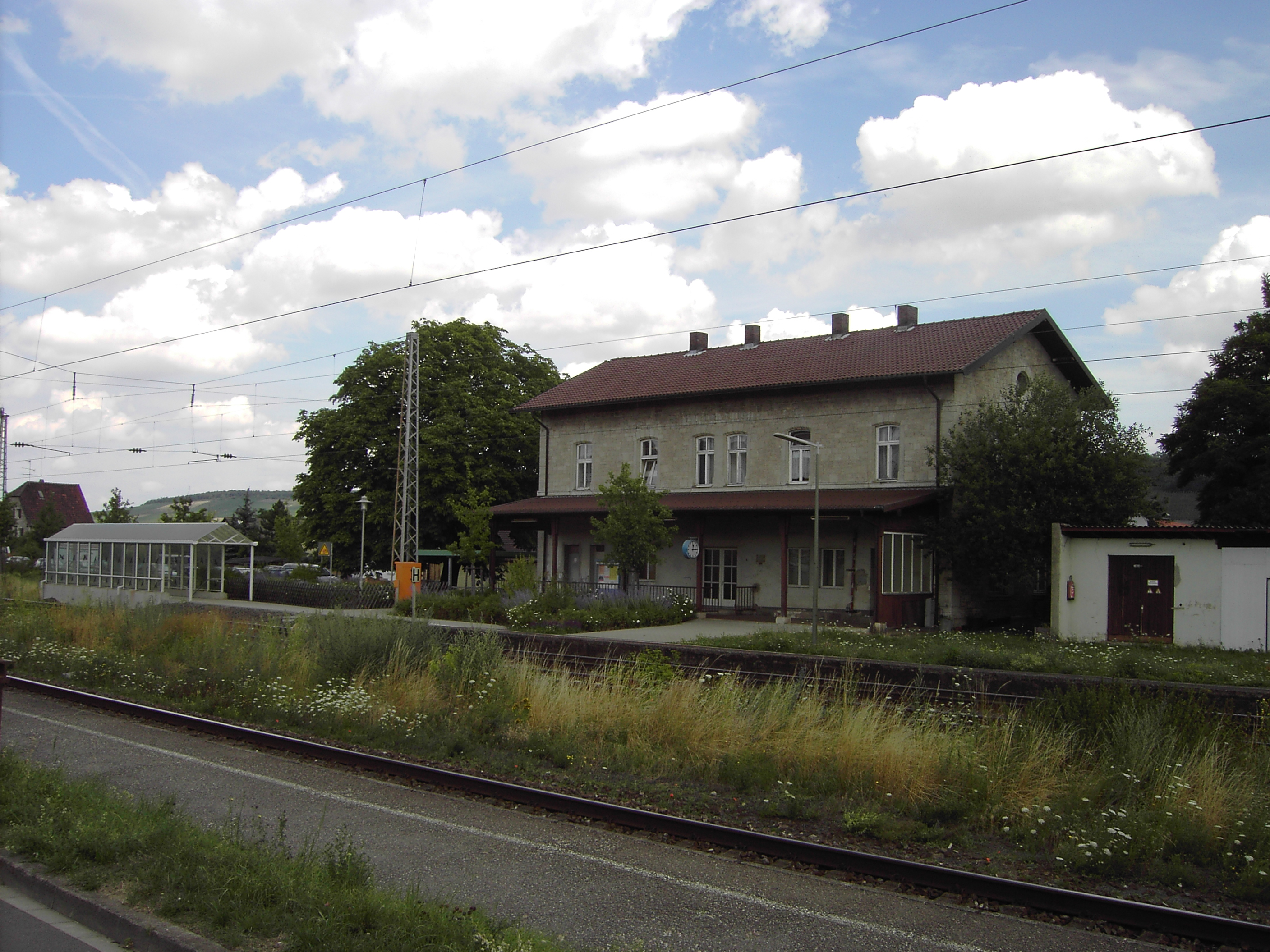
Winterhausen station

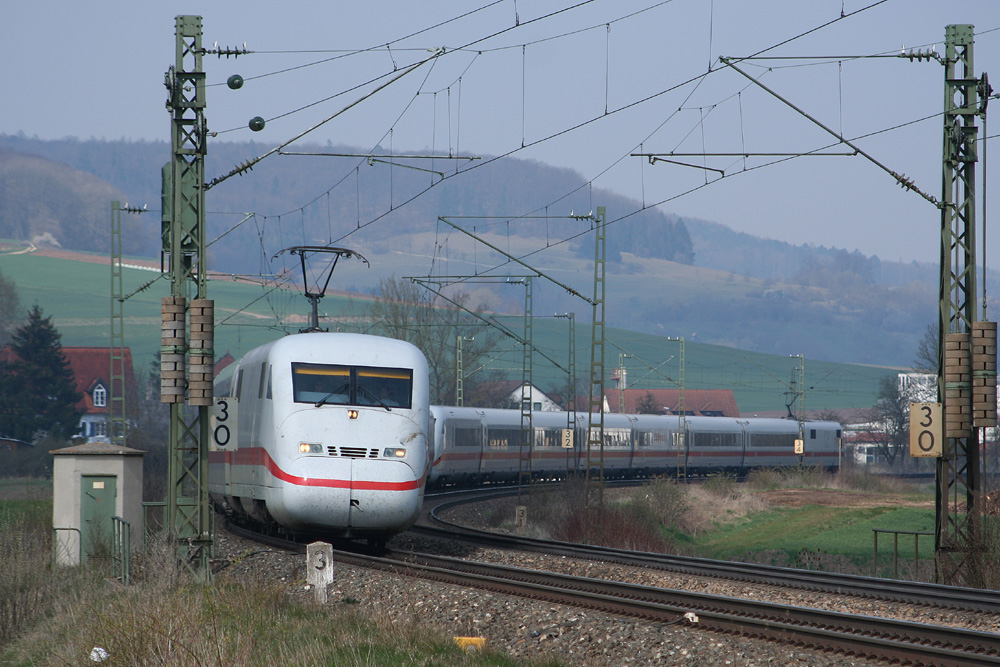
ICE 2 between Wettelsheim and Treuchtlingen

The line formerly had an important role for German north–south long-distance trains. Since the 24 km longer detour via Nuremberg was often avoided, the trains between Würzburg and Treuchtlingen were hauled by a steam or diesel locomotive in front of the electric locomotive that would normally haul it. Even now, some pairs of Intercity-Express trains continue to run between Hamburg and Bremen and Munich without stopping between Würzburg and Augsburg. There are also two daily pairs of InterCity trains (called the Königssee and Großglockner) and some extra weekend trains, which stop in Treuchtlingen, Gunzenhausen and Ansbach, and sometimes in Steinach.

In regional traffic, the line is operated by DB Regio as part of the E-Netzes Würzburg. Until December 2022, Alstom Coradia Continental (class 440) sets ran hourly and class 425 sets ran in the evening and at the weekend on the Treuchtlingen–Würzburg Regionalbahn services. Some additional services ran during peak times on weekdays to increase frequencies to approximately 30 minute intervals between Marktbreit and Würzburg; four train pairs of trains continue through Würzburg on the Main–Spessart railway to Karlstadt am Main. When the timetable changed in December 2022, Go-Ahead Bayern, which had won the tender for Lot 1 of the Augsburg networks, took over the operation of local transport for twelve years. The line is now operated with three-carriage Siemens Mireo electric multiple units.

The line is of great importance for freight. Many freight trains run on the line from Würzburg to Munich and Nuremberg; the capacity is insufficient in places today. It is used by many locomotive types, and private operators are well represented.

The halt at Burgbernheim-Wildbad was reopened when the timetable changed in December 2010.
