= Burgbernheim (Verwaltungsgemeinschaft) =

- Verwaltungsgemeinschaft
- Location of Burgbernheim within Neustadt (Aisch)-Bad Windsheim district
- Interactive map of Burgbernheim
- Location within Germany Location within Bavaria
- Coordinates: 49°27′N 10°19′E
- Country: Germany
- State: Bavaria
- Admin. region: Middle Franconia
- District: Neustadt (Aisch)-Bad Windsheim
- Seat: Burgbernheim
- Subdivisions: 4 municipalities

Area
  - Total: 103.09 km^{2} (39.80 sq mi)

Population (2025-12-31)
  - Total: 6,833
  - Density: 66.28/km^{2} (171.7/sq mi)
- Time zone: UTC+01:00 (CET)
  - Summer (DST): UTC+02:00 (CEST)
- Website: www.burgbernheim.de

Burgbernheim is a Verwaltungsgemeinschaft (municipal association) in the district Neustadt (Aisch)-Bad Windsheim in Bavaria, Germany. Its seat is in Burgbernheim.

It consists of the following municipalities:

1. Burgbernheim
2. Gallmersgarten
3. Illesheim
4. Marktbergel
