= Gallmersgarten =

- Municipality
- Coat of arms

- Location of Gallmersgarten within Neustadt an der Aisch-Bad Windsheim district
- Interactive map of Gallmersgarten
- Location within Germany Location within Bavaria
- Coordinates: 49°27′N 10°16′E
- Country: Germany
- State: Bavaria
- Admin. region: Mittelfranken
- District: Neustadt an der Aisch-Bad Windsheim
- Municipal assoc.: Burgbernheim
- Subdivisions: 7 Ortsteile

Government
  - Mayor (2020–26): Michael Schlehlein

Area
  - Total: 15.17 km^{2} (5.86 sq mi)
- Elevation: 356 m (1,168 ft)

Population (2025-12-31)
  - Total: 736
  - Density: 48.5/km^{2} (126/sq mi)
- Time zone: UTC+01:00 (CET)
  - Summer (DST): UTC+02:00 (CEST)
- Postal codes: 91605
- Dialling codes: 09843
- Vehicle registration: NEA
- Website: www.gemeinde-gallmersgarten.de

Gallmersgarten is a municipality in the district of Neustadt (Aisch)-Bad Windsheim in Bavaria in Germany.

== Mayor ==
- 1996–2020: Emil Kötzel
- since 2020: Michael Schlehlein
