= Ochsenfurt station =

Railway station in Germany

Ochsenfurt
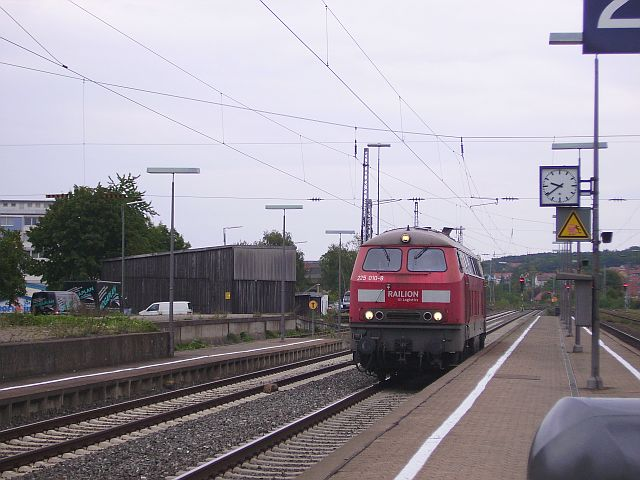
- 2008

General information
- Location: Bahnhofplatz 1; 97199 Ochsenfurt; Bavaria; Germany
- Coordinates: 49.6632°N 10.0716°E
- Elevation: 192 m (630 ft)
- Owner: DB Netz
- Operator: DB Station&Service
- Lines: Treuchtlingen–Würzburg railway (KBS 920); Gau Railway
- Platforms: 1 island platform 1 side platform
- Tracks: 5

Other information
- Station code: 4720
- DS100 code: NOF
- IBNR: 8000818
- Category: 5
- Fare zone: NVM: A/262
- Website: www.bahnhof.de

History
- Opened: 1 July 1864; 162 years ago

Services
Preceding station	DB Regio Bayern	Following station
Goßmannsdorf towards Würzburg Hbf	RB 80	Marktbreit Terminus
Preceding station		Following station
Goßmannsdorf towards Würzburg Hbf	RE 80	Marktbreit towards München Hbf
Location
- Location within Bavaria Location within Germany Location within Europe

Ochsenfurt station is a railway station in the municipality of Ochsenfurt, located in the district of Würzburg in Lower Franconia, Germany.
