= Johann Christoph Döderlein =

German theologian (1745–1792)

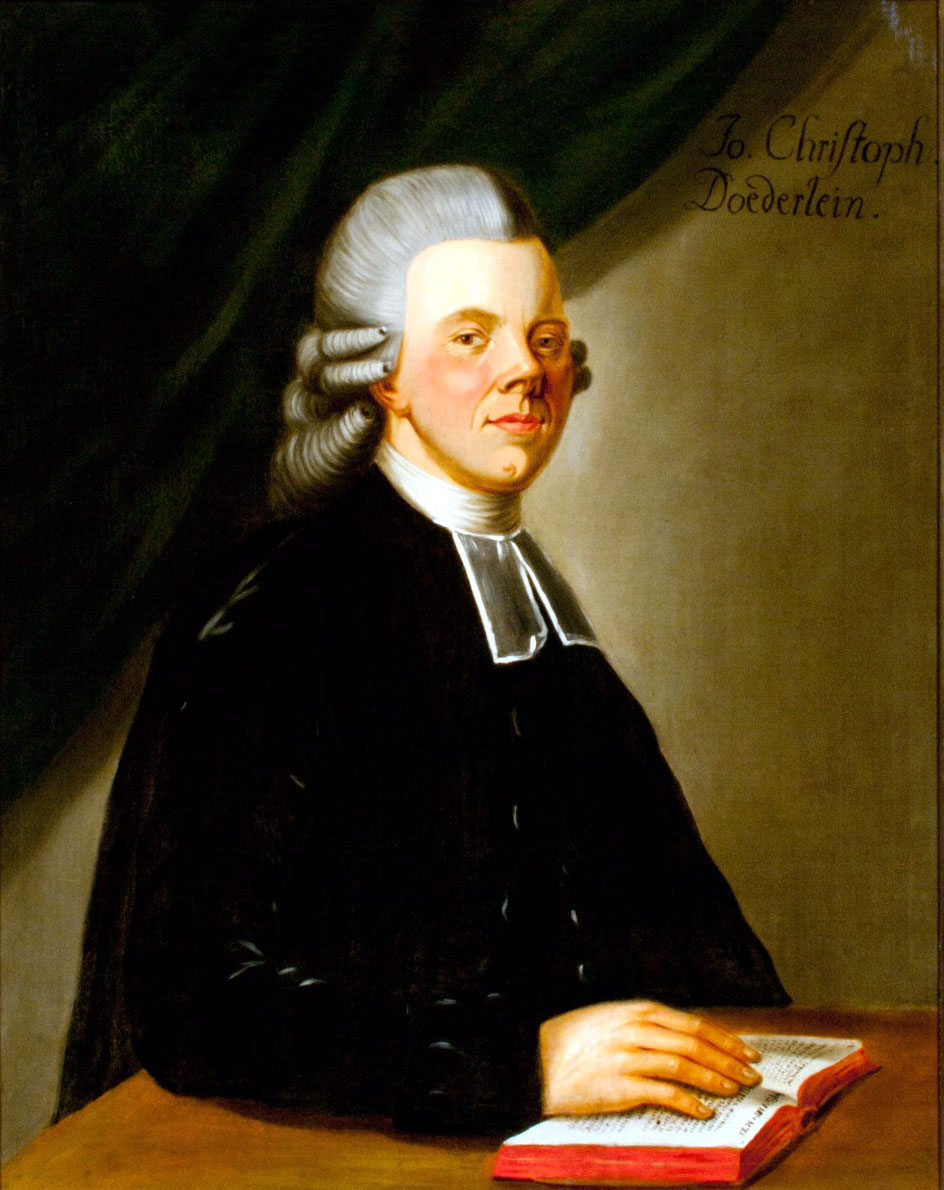
Johann Christoph Döderlein

Johann Christoph Döderlein or Doederlein (20 January 1745 in Windsheim – 2 December 1792 in Jena) was a German Protestant theologian.

As professor of theology at Jena from 1782, he was celebrated for his varied learning, for his eloquence as a preacher, and for the important influence he exerted in guiding the transition movement from strict orthodoxy to a freer theology. His most important work Institutio theologi christiani nostris temporibus accommodata was published in 1780.

In his 1775 work Esaias, ex recensione textus hebraei, Döderlein was the first to hypothesize that the book of Isaiah was composed over many hundreds of years, containing texts from both an 8th-century prophet named Isaiah (chapters 1-39) and an unnamed prophet of the 6th century (chapters 40-66), who would come to be known in scholarship as "Deutero-Isaiah." A few decades later, Bernhard Duhm would split Deutero-Isaiah into two units, an earlier Deutero-Isaiah (chapters 40-55) and a later Trito-Isaiah (chapters 56-66).

Johann was the father of the philologist Johann Christoph Wilhelm Ludwig Döderlein, known as Ludwig.
