= Johann Alexander Döderlein =

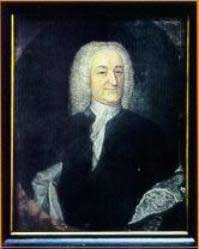
- Born: 11 February 1675; Bieswang
- Died: 23 October 1745 (aged 70); Weißenburg am Sand
- Education: University of Altdorf
- Occupations: historian, polymath, educationist, philologist, numismatist, antiquarian, and chronicler

Johann Alexander Döderlein (February 11, 1675 - October 23, 1745) was a German historian, philologist and numismatist. He studied at University of Altdorf near Nuremberg. He was polymath and his field of work included archaeology, classical studies, meteorology, and regional history. Döderlein was a member of the Prussian Academy of Sciences and of the German Academy of Sciences Leopoldina. He was rector of the Alte Lateinschule, the former school of Weißenburg am Sand.
