= Kihlakunnanvouti =

Finnish enforcement officer

Kihlakunnanvouti is the title of a Finnish enforcement officer (ulosottomies). In the Åland Islands, the equivalent title is maakunnanvouti.

A kihlakunnanvouti must have a legal education and be a qualified lawyer. They are assisted by kihlakunnanulosottomiehet, who handle most individual enforcement cases (approximately 3.35 million cases per year). In addition, enforcement offices employ administrative staff. The total number of enforcement personnel in Finland is 1,017.

The Enforcement Authority of Finland (Ulosottolaitos) is a national agency with 64 offices across the country. The heads of enforcement units are known as johtava kihlakunnanvouti (leading kihlakunnanvouti).

The johtava kihlakunnanvouti and kihlakunnanvouti are appointed by the Valtakunnanvouti (National Enforcement Officer).

The title of kihlakunnanvouti was introduced in the 1990s as part of a regional reform. Before that, enforcement duties were handled by the kaupunginvouti in old towns and by the local nimismies (lensmann) in other areas.
