= Burgbernheim =

- Town
- Coat of arms

- Location of Burgbernheim within Neustadt a.d.Aisch-Bad Windsheim district
- Interactive map of Burgbernheim
- Location within Germany Location within Bavaria
- Coordinates: 49°27′N 10°19′E
- Country: Germany
- State: Bavaria
- Admin. region: Mittelfranken
- District: Neustadt a.d.Aisch-Bad Windsheim
- Municipal assoc.: Burgbernheim
- Subdivisions: 3 Ortsteile

Government
  - Mayor (2020–26): Matthias Schwarz

Area
  - Total: 42.3 km^{2} (16.3 sq mi)
- Elevation: 359 m (1,178 ft)

Population (2025-12-31)
  - Total: 3,517
  - Density: 83.1/km^{2} (215/sq mi)
- Time zone: UTC+01:00 (CET)
  - Summer (DST): UTC+02:00 (CEST)
- Postal codes: 91593
- Dialling codes: 09843
- Vehicle registration: NEA
- Website: www.burgbernheim.de

Burgbernheim (German pronunciation: [bʊʁkˈbɛʁnhaɪm]; East Franconian: Bärna) is a town in the Neustadt (Aisch)-Bad Windsheim district, in Bavaria, Germany. It is situated 9 km (6 mi) southwest of Bad Windsheim, and 13 km (8 mi) northeast of Rothenburg ob der Tauber. It has a population of around 3,300.
