= Burgvogt =

The Burgvogt was the administrator of a castle in the Holy Roman Empire.

== Duties and powers ==
The Burgvogt organized life in a castle, its general operation, husbandry and military defence. He was also in charge of jurisdiction within a castle district, i.e. within the castle and the surrounding area belonging to it. His office was known as a Burgvogtei.

== History ==
Castles had been administered since the Early Middle Ages by castle commanders, captains or governors (Burghauptmänner), also known as castellans (Kastellane). This led to the development of the terms Burgvoigt, the man specifically in charge of organisation and jurisdiction, and Burggraf (English: burgrave), who ruled over the wider territory around a castle, the Burggrafschaft (English: burgraviate).

The title of Burgvogt retained its importance after the Middle Ages, as an influential administrator of a castle or palace, until around the end of the 18th century.

In the present day, the term Burgvogt is still used in German-speaking countries as the term for the administrator of a castle, usually one that serves tourist purposes.

== Literature ==
- Dimitz, August (2013). History of Carniola Volume III: From Ancient Times to the Year 1813, Volume 3, tr. by Andrew J. Witter. Slovenian Genealogy Society International.
- Ebers, John (1796), The New and Complete Dictionary of the German and English Languages, Volume 1. Leipzig: Breitkopf & Haertel.
