= Marktbergel =

- Municipality
- Coat of arms

- Location of Marktbergel within Neustadt a.d.Aisch-Bad Windsheim district
- Interactive map of Marktbergel
- Location within Germany Location within Bavaria
- Coordinates: 49°27′N 10°22′E
- Country: Germany
- State: Bavaria
- Admin. region: Mittelfranken
- District: Neustadt a.d.Aisch-Bad Windsheim
- Municipal assoc.: Burgbernheim
- Subdivisions: 4 Ortsteile

Government
  - Mayor (2020–26): Manfred Kern

Area
  - Total: 24.20 km^{2} (9.34 sq mi)
- Elevation: 363 m (1,191 ft)

Population (2025-12-31)
  - Total: 1,646
  - Density: 68.02/km^{2} (176.2/sq mi)
- Time zone: UTC+01:00 (CET)
  - Summer (DST): UTC+02:00 (CEST)
- Postal codes: 91613
- Dialling codes: 09843
- Vehicle registration: NEA
- Website: www.marktbergel.de

Marktbergel is a municipality in the district of Neustadt (Aisch)-Bad Windsheim in Bavaria in Germany.

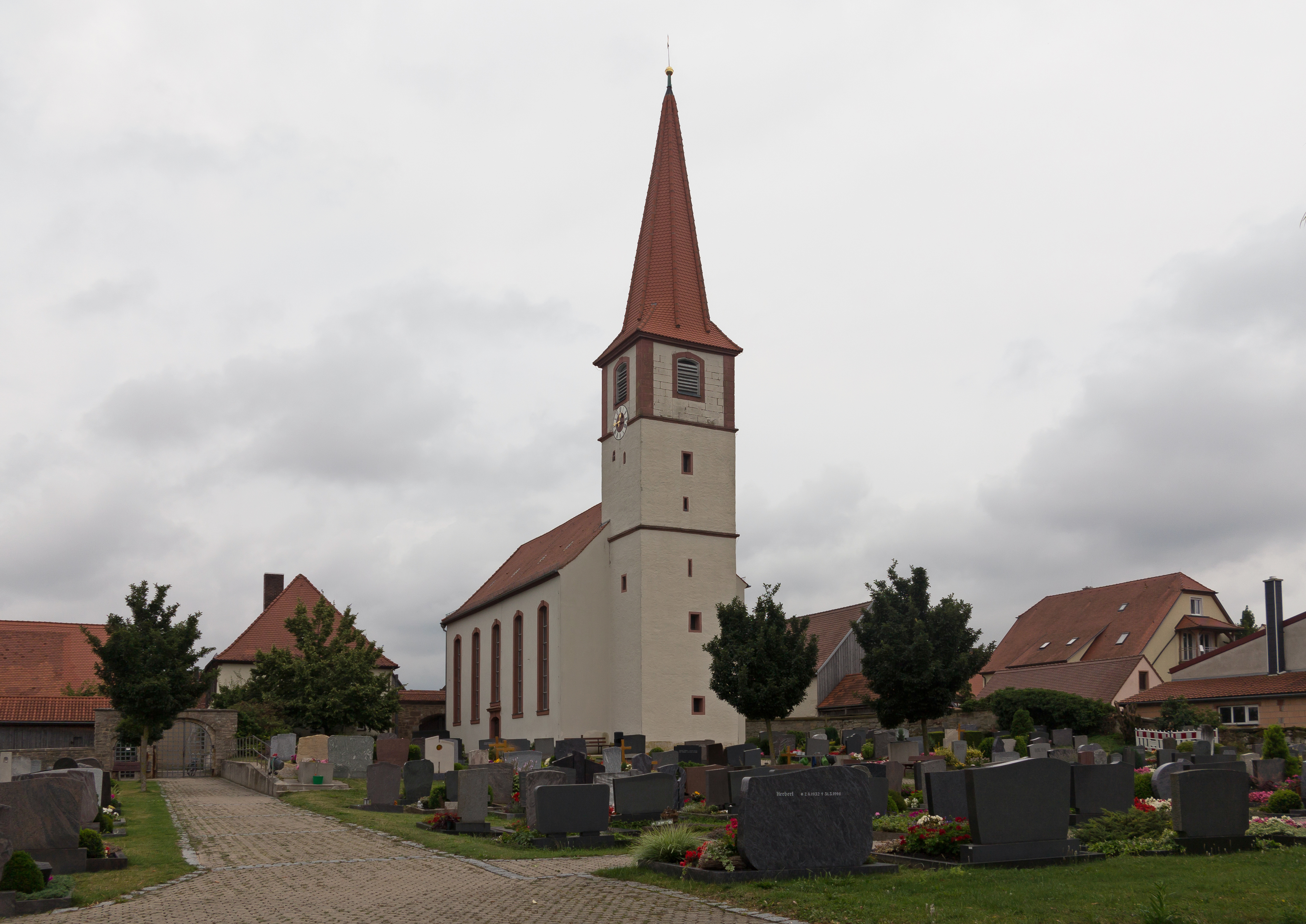
Reformed church: Pfarrkirche Sankt Veit

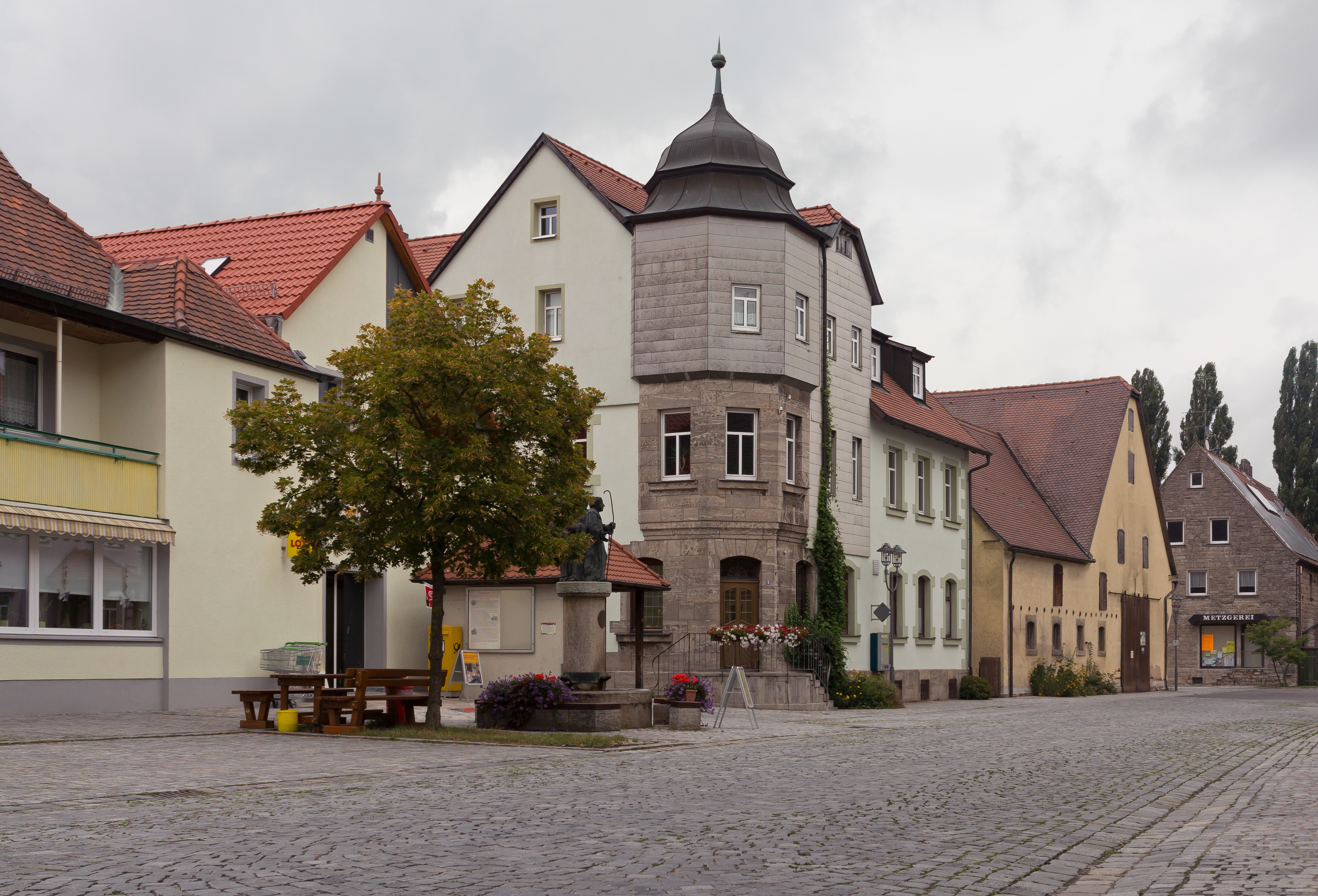
View to the street: die Würzburger Strasse

== Mayor ==
Manfred Kern was elected as the new mayor in March 2014, and re-elected in 2020.
