= Johann Christoph Wilhelm Ludwig Döderlein =

German philologist (1791–1863)

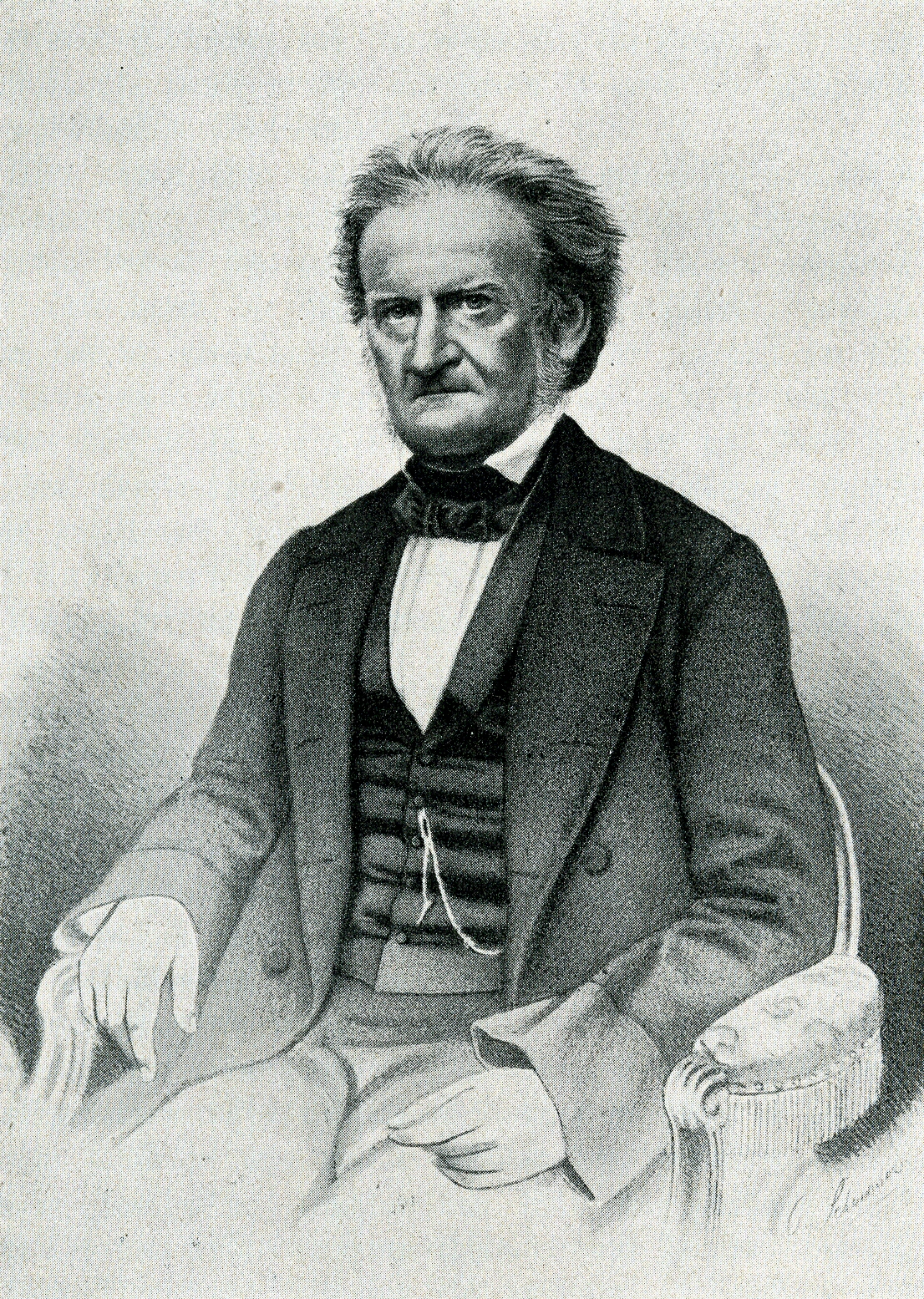

Johann Christoph Wilhelm Ludwig Döderlein (19 December 1791 – 9 November 1863) was a German philologist.

== Biography ==
Ludwig Döderlein was born at Jena. His father was Johann Christoph Döderlein, professor of theology at Jena. After receiving his preliminary education at Windsheim and Schulpforta (Pforta), he studied at the Ludwig-Maximilians-Universität München, Heidelberg University, the University of Erlangen, and the Friedrich Wilhelm University of Berlin. He devoted his chief attention to philology under the instruction of such men as F. Thiersch, G. F. Creuzer, J. H. Voss, F. A. Wolf, August Boeckh and P. K. Buttmann.

In 1815, soon after completing his studies at the Friedrich Wilhelm University of Berlin, he accepted the appointment of ordinary professor of philology at the University of Bern. In 1819, he was transferred to the University of Erlangen, where he became second professor of philology in the university and also rector of the Erlangen gymnasium. In 1827, he became first professor of philology and rhetoric and director of the philological seminary.

== Works ==
Döderlein's most elaborate work as a philologist was marred by over-subtlety, and lacked method and clearness. He is best known by his Lateinische Synonymen und Etymologien (1826-1838), and his Homerisches Glossarium (1850-1858). To the same class belong his Lateinische Wortbildung (1838), Handbuch der lateinischen Synonymik (1839), and the Handbuch der lateinischen Etymologie (1841), besides various works of a more elementary kind intended for the use of schools and gymnasia. Most of the works named have been translated into English.

To critical philology Döderlein contributed valuable editions of Tacitus (Opera, 1847; Germania, with a German translation) and Horace (Epistolae, with a German translation, 1856-1858; Satirae, 1860). His Reden und Aufsätze (Erlangen, 1843-1847) and Öffentliche Reden (1860) consist chiefly of academic addresses dealing with various subjects in pedagogy and philology.
