= Bad Windsheim =

- Town
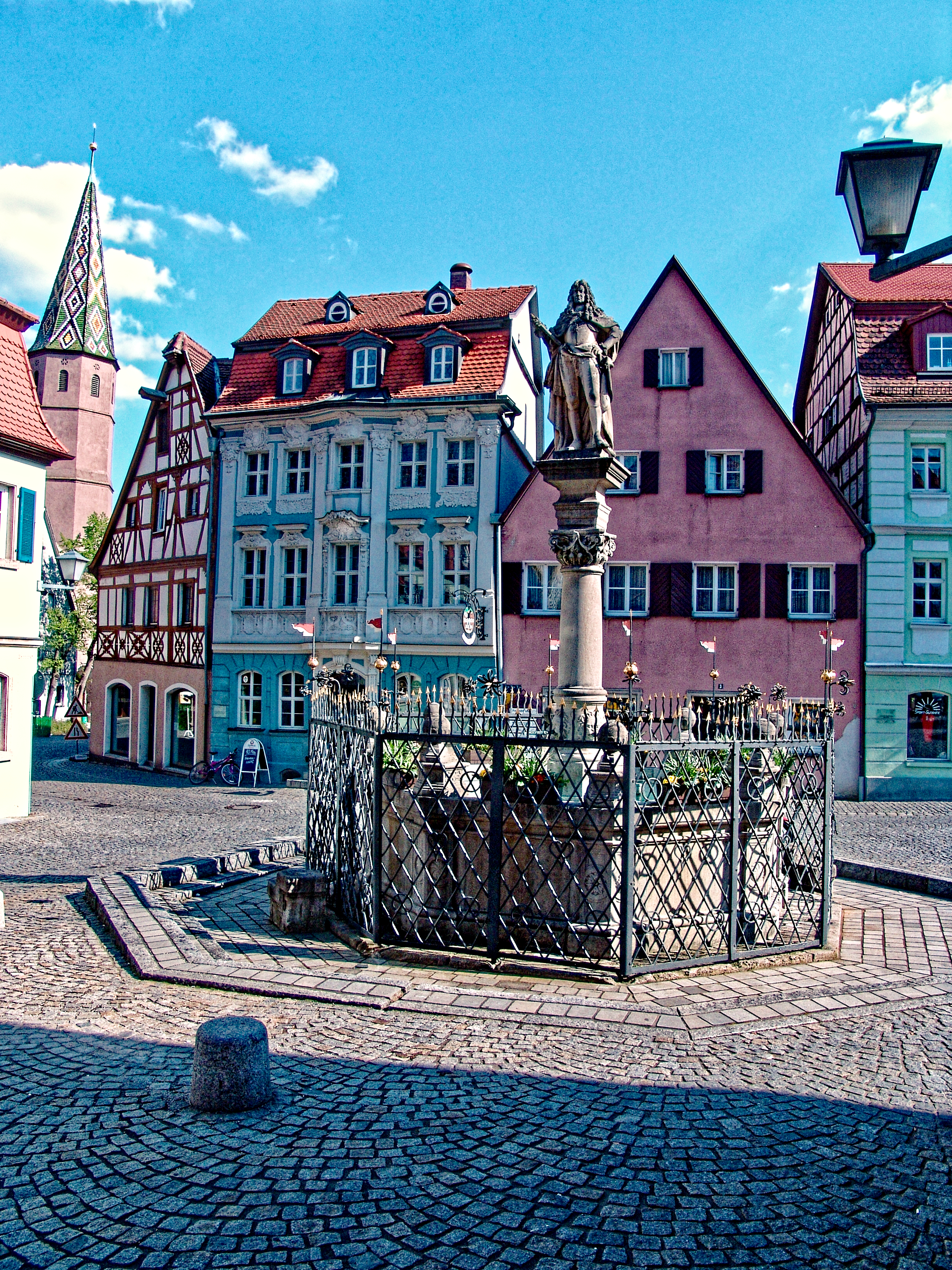
- Market square of Bad Windsheim

- Coat of arms

- Location of Bad Windsheim within Neustadt a.d.Aisch-Bad Windsheim district
- Interactive map of Bad Windsheim
- Location within Germany Location within Bavaria
- Coordinates: 49°30′N 10°25′E
- Country: Germany
- State: Bavaria
- District: Neustadt a.d.Aisch-Bad Windsheim
- Subdivisions: 14 Ortsteile

Government
  - Mayor (2020–26): Jürgen Heckel

Area
  - Total: 78.24 km^{2} (30.21 sq mi)
- Elevation: 321 m (1,053 ft)

Population (2025-12-31)
  - Total: 12,329
  - Density: 157.6/km^{2} (408.1/sq mi)
- Time zone: UTC+01:00 (CET)
  - Summer (DST): UTC+02:00 (CEST)
- Postal codes: 91438
- Dialling codes: 09841
- Vehicle registration: NEA, SEF, UFF
- Website: www.bad-windsheim.de

Bad Windsheim (German pronunciation: [baːt ˈvɪntsˌhaɪm]; East Franconian: Winsa) is a historic town in Bavaria, Germany with a population of more than 12,000. It lies in the district Neustadt an der Aisch-Bad Windsheim, west of Nuremberg. In the Holy Roman Empire, Windsheim held the rank of Imperial City (until 1802). Since 1810 Windsheim is part of Bavaria. In 1961, it became a spa town and has since been called "Bad Windsheim".

== Climate ==
The climate in this area shows only small differences between highs and lows, and there is adequate rainfall year-round. The Köppen Climate Classification subtype for this climate is "Cfb" (Marine West Coast Climate/Oceanic climate).

== History ==
The town is first recorded in a document from 741, then called Uuinidesheim. Through linguistic development, the name changed to "Windsheim", meaning "the home of the wind".

Towards the end of World War II, on April 12, 1945, a Volkssturm battalion took control of the town to allow for the Nazi troops to retreat over the Aisch river and blow up the bridges afterwards to prevent the Americans from using them. The residents of the town believed that the battalion was there to defend the town and sent a women demonstrated, to demand that the battalion leave the town. Two people were shot; one person who had flown a white cloth from his window, and a woman who had been alleged to have been the ringleader of the demonstration. Though the residents were unsuccessful in convincing the battalion to leave, the battalion left on April 14 following their destruction of the railways and bridges. The city was captured by the 101st Cavalry Regiment on April 15.

== Attractions ==
The town is known for its waters and spa, Franken-Therme, and an open-air museum, the Freilandmuseum, which brings together old farms and farmhouses from the area. On the first weekend in August every year Bad Windsheim is the location for an event called Weinturm Open Air, a concert on the top of a hill in the town. The town also features a war memorial in the form of a large statue of Roland.

== Notable people ==
=== Sons and daughters of the town ===
- Georg Wilhelm Steller (1709–1746), physician and scientist who participated in the Great Northern Expedition
- Johann Christoph Döderlein (1745–1792), theologian
- Otto Strasser (1897–1974), politician, brother of Gregor Strasser
- Erich Mühe (1938–2005), surgeon, founder of micro-invasive surgery in 1985
- Nevio Passaro (born 1980), German-Italian singer and songwriter
- Vyncint Smith (born 1996), American Football Wide Receiver in the National Football League (NFL)

=== Personalities who worked locally ===
- Francis Daniel Pastorius (1651–1719), German lawyer and writers, he is considered to be the founder of the first German settlement in North America.
