= Ebermergen station =

Railway station in the municipality of Harburg (Schwaben)

Ebermergen

General information
- Location: Bahnweg 3; 86655 Harburg (Schwaben); Bavaria; Germany
- Coordinates: 48°45′23″N 10°42′39″E
- Elevation: 416 m (1,365 ft)
- System: Hp
- Owner: DB Netz
- Operator: DB Station&Service
- Lines: Augsburg–Nördlingen (KBS 995)
- Platforms: 1 side platform
- Tracks: 1
- Train operators: Go-Ahead Bayern
- Connections: Bus interchange

Construction
- Parking: yes

Other information
- Station code: 1434
- DS100 code: MEBM
- IBNR: 8001628
- Category: 7
- Website: www.bahnhof.de

Services
Preceding station		Following station
Harburg (Schwab) towards Aalen Hbf	RB 89	Wörnitzstein towards Donauwörth
Harburg (Schwab) towards Aalen Hbf	RE 89	Wörnitzstein towards München Hbf
Location
- Location within Bavaria Location within Germany Location within Europe

Ebermergen station is a railway stop in the municipality of Harburg (Schwaben), located in the Donau-Ries district in Bavaria, Germany. The station lies on the Augsburg–Nördlingen railway. The train services are operated by Go-Ahead Bayern.
