= Möttingen station =

Railway station in the municipality of Möttingen

Möttingen

General information
- Location: Romantische Straße 47; 86753 Möttingen; Bavaria; Germany
- Coordinates: 48°48′24″N 10°35′51″E
- Elevation: 414 m (1,358 ft)
- System: Bf
- Owner: DB Netz
- Operator: DB Station&Service
- Lines: Augsburg–Nördlingen (KBS 995)
- Platforms: 2 side platforms
- Tracks: 2
- Train operators: Go-Ahead Bayern
- Connections: Bus interchange

Construction
- Parking: yes
- Cycle facilities: yes

Other information
- Station code: 4190
- DS100 code: MMTN
- IBNR: 8004071
- Category: 6
- Website: www.bahnhof.de

Services
Preceding station		Following station
Nördlingen towards Aalen Hbf	RB 89	Hoppingen towards Donauwörth
Nördlingen towards Aalen Hbf	RE 89	Hoppingen towards München Hbf
Location
- Location within Bavaria Location within Germany Location within Europe

Möttingen station is a railway station in the municipality of Möttingen, located in the Donau-Ries district in Bavaria, Germany. The station lies on the Augsburg–Nördlingen railway. The train services are operated by Go-Ahead Bayern.
