= Ries Railway =

The Riesbahn ("Ries Railway") is a name for the railway connection between Aalen and Donauwörth, which runs through the Nördlinger Ries:

- Stuttgart-Bad Cannstatt–Nördlingen railway
- Augsburg–Nördlingen railway
