= Hoppingen station =

Railway station in the municipality of Hoppingen

Hoppingen
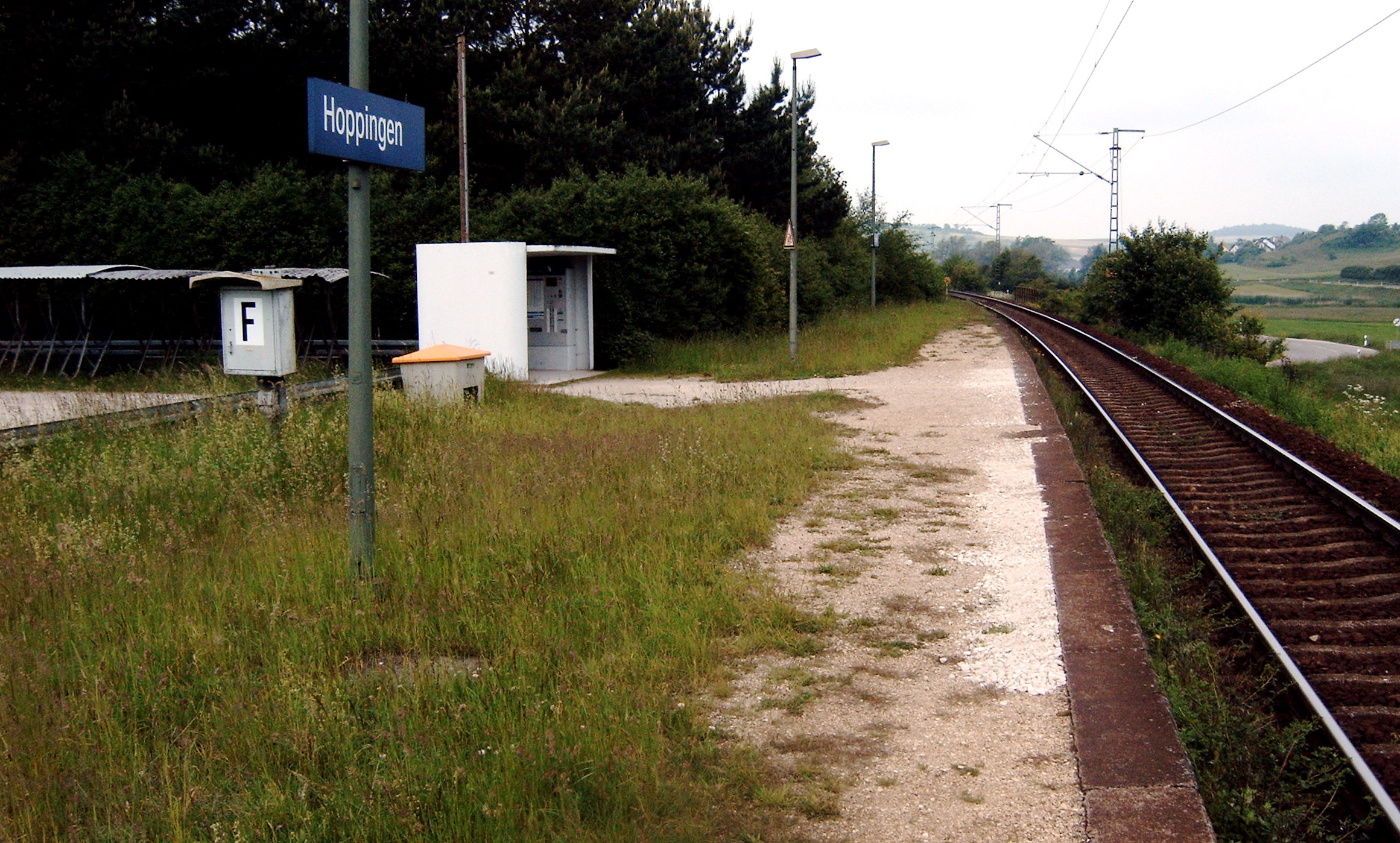

General information
- Location: Hauptstraße 32; 86655 Harburg (Schwaben); Bavaria; Germany
- Coordinates: 48°48′14″N 10°39′11″E
- Elevation: 408 m (1,339 ft)
- System: Hp
- Owner: DB Netz
- Operator: DB Station&Service
- Lines: Augsburg–Nördlingen (KBS 995)
- Platforms: 1 side platform
- Tracks: 1
- Train operators: Go-Ahead Bayern
- Connections: Bus interchange

Construction
- Parking: yes
- Cycle facilities: yes
- Accessible: yes

Other information
- Station code: 2904
- DS100 code: MHOP
- IBNR: 8002994
- Category: 7
- Website: www.bahnhof.de

Services
Preceding station		Following station
Möttingen towards Aalen Hbf	RB 89	Harburg (Schwab) towards Donauwörth
Möttingen towards Aalen Hbf	RE 89	Harburg (Schwab) towards München Hbf
Location
- Location within Bavaria Location within Germany Location within Europe

Hoppingen station is a railway stop in the municipality of Harburg (Schwaben), located in the Donau-Ries district in Bavaria, Germany. The station lies on the Augsburg–Nördlingen railway. The train services are operated by Go-Ahead Bayern.
