= Nördlingen station =

Railway station in Bavaria, Germany

Nördlingen
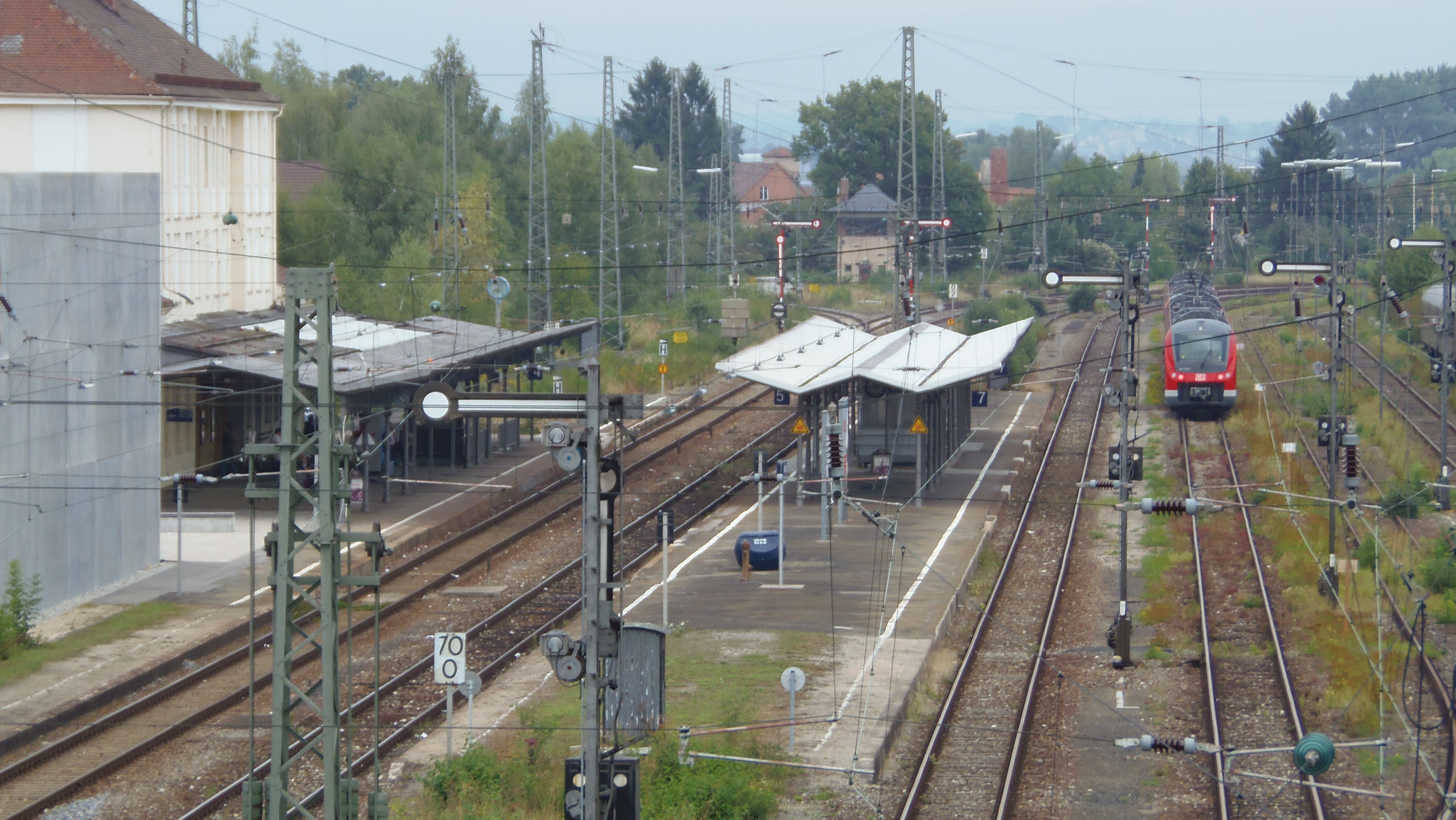
- Nördlingen station

General information
- Location: Bürgermeister-Reiger-Str. 5, Nördlingen, Bavaria; Germany
- Coordinates: 48°51′3″N 10°29′52″E
- Lines: Augsburg–Nördlingen; Stuttgart–Nördlingen; Nördlingen–Dombühl; Nördlingen–Pleinfeld; Nördlingen–Wemding closed
- Platforms: 3
- Connections: Bus interchange

Construction
- Accessible: Yes

Other information
- Station code: 4580
- DS100 code: TSUN
- IBNR: 8000280
- Category: 5
- Fare zone: OAM: 1895
- Website: stationsdatenbank.de; www.bahnhof.de

History
- Opened: 1 February 1866

Services
Preceding station		Following station
Pflaumloch towards Aalen Hbf	RB 89	Möttingen towards Donauwörth
Pflaumloch towards Aalen Hbf	RE 89	Möttingen towards München Hbf
Location

Nördlingen railway station is a Deutsche Bahn railway station in Nördlingen, Bavaria, Germany.

== History ==
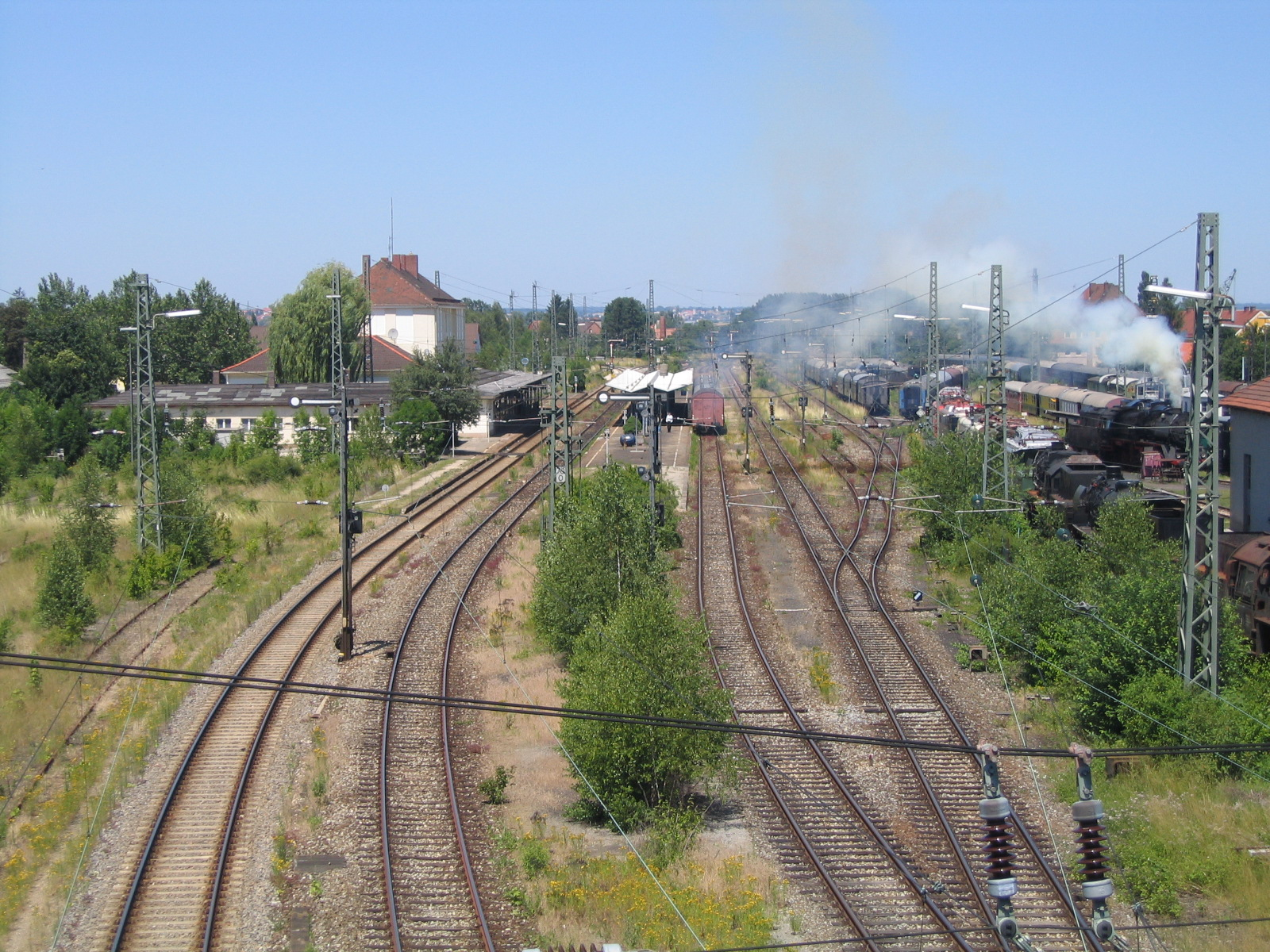
The station seen from the south (from Donauwörth)

During the construction of the Ludwig South-North Railway (Ludwig-Süd-Nord-Bahn), a station was also planned in Nördlingen, with the intention of facilitating a connection to the Württemberg railway network. The 42.4 km (26.3 mi) long Donauwörth–Nördlingen–Oettingen section was built by the Royal Bavarian State Railways and opened on 15 May 1849. The Aalen–Nördlingen section, however, was built by the Royal Württemberg State Railways. It was opened in 1863, connecting Württemberg to the Bavarian railway network. However, a separate terminal station was built in Nördlingen for the Württemberg line.

The Bavarian Railway Museum (BEM) is now housed in the former Nördlingen engine depot (Betriebswerk). It is also the base of the BayernBahn Betriebsgesellschaft mbH (BayernBahn, Bavarian Railway Operations Company), a private train operating company that operates freight traffic on the lines in the area.

There are two signal boxes (for dispatching and for controlling access to sidings); these are mechanical interlocking of the Jüdel class and was built in 1929. The station still has semaphore signals.

== Train operations ==
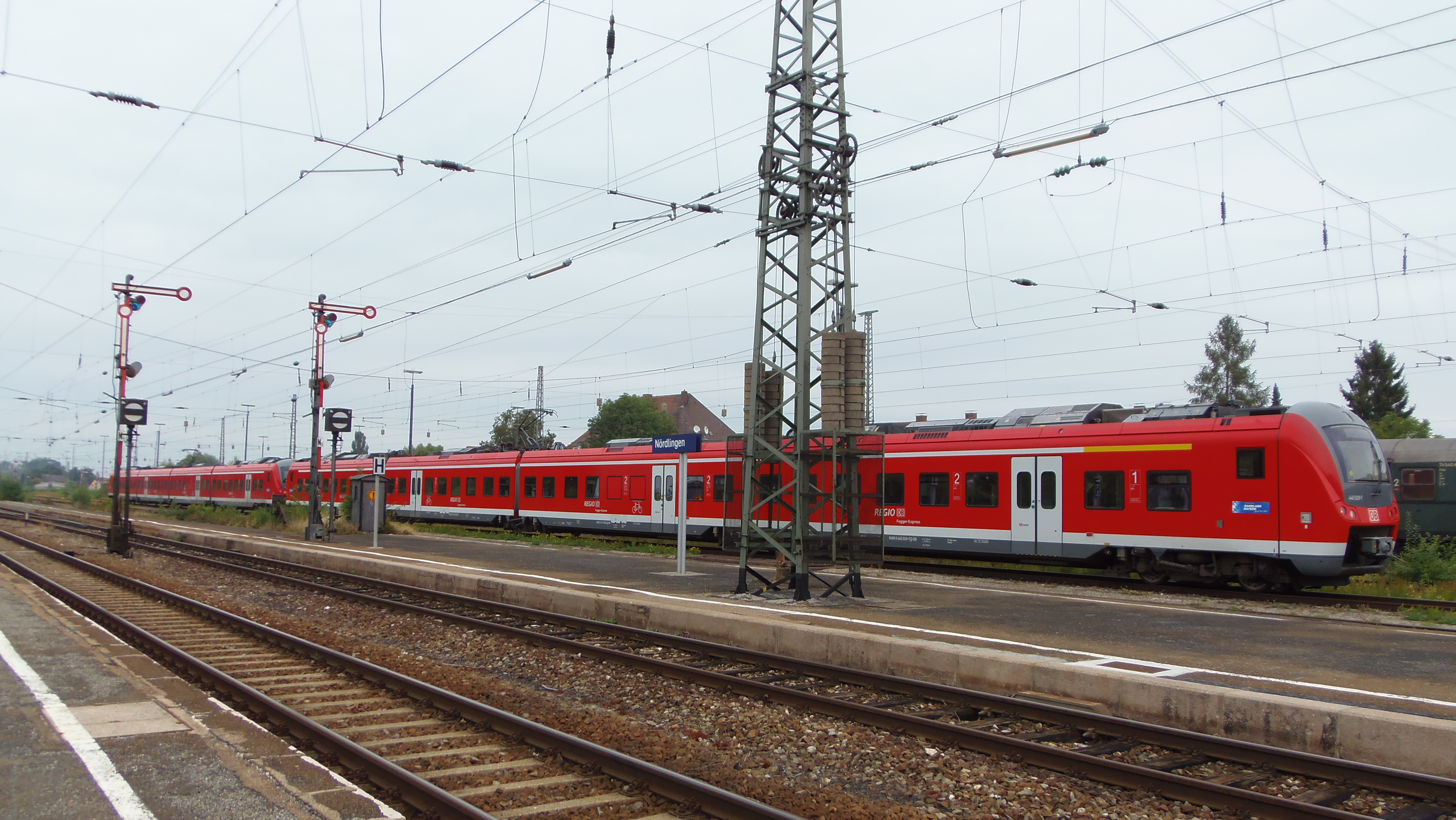
Railcar 440

DB Regio Bayern operated Regionalbahn services as the Fugger-Express until December 2022, using Alstom Coradia Continental (class 440) electric multiple units. Since then, this line has been operated as part of the Augsburger Netze under Go-Ahead Bayern. The lines to Feuchtwangen and Gunzenhausen are only operated by passenger trains in the summer (otherwise they are exclusively used by freight). These are operated with diesel and steam locomotives.

Train type	Train route	Clock frequency
RE 89; RB 89	Augsburger Netze: Aalen – Nördlingen – Donauwörth (– Augsburg – Munich)	Mon–Fri hourly, Sat and Sun 2-hourly
RB 87	Nördlingen – Harburg (Schwab) – Donauwörth – Augsburg (– Munich)	hourly in the peak
Seenland-Express	Nördlingen – Oettingen (Bay) – Wassertrüdingen – Gunzenhausen	two pairs of trains on Sundays in summer
