= Donauwörth–Treuchtlingen railway =

Railway line in Bavaria, Germany

Donauwörth–Treuchtlingen

Overview
- Status: Operational
- Owner: DB Netz
- Line number: 5310
- Locale: Bavaria, Germany
- Termini: Donauwörth; Treuchtlingen
- Stations: 3

Service
- Type: Heavy rail, Passenger/freight rail Regional rail, Intercity rail
- Route number: 910
- Operator(s): Go-Ahead

History
- Opened: Stages between 1844; 181 years ago and 1906; 119 years ago

Technical
- Line length: 34.546 km (21.466 mi)
- Number of tracks: Double track
- Track gauge: 1,435 mm (4 ft 8 1/2 in) standard gauge
- Electrification: 15 kV/16.7 Hz AC overhead catenary
- Operating speed: 160 km/h (99 mph)

The Donauwörth–Treuchtlingen railway is a double-track, electrified main line in the German state of Bavaria. It branches off the Augsburg–Nördlingen railway in Donauwörth and runs across the Franconian Jura to Treuchtlingen.

The line is part of the core network of the Trans-European Networks. It is also part of the national long-distance connection between Munich, Augsburg and Nuremberg. Even after the opening of the Nuremberg–Ingolstadt high-speed railway, it is still used for long-distance services. It is also used as a detour during closures of the high-speed line for maintenance.

== History ==
The first Bavarian railway, the state-owned Ludwig South-North Railway built from 1843 to 1853, bypassed the Franconian Jura, since it was uneconomical to climb it with the technology of the time. Instead, the line took a long detour via Nördlingen through the Nordlinger Ries depression, where only slight gradients had to be overcome. An intended side effect of this route was the possibility of a direct connection to the Württemberg railway network, which was realised in 1863 with the opening of the Stuttgart–Nördlingen line.

Treuchtlingen received its first railway connection on 2 October 1869 with the opening of a line from Gunzenhausen. At the same time, work was also being done on the extension of the Ingolstadt–Treuchtlingen railway to Treuchtlingen and the continuation from Treuchtlingen to Pleinfeld, which went into operation immediately afterwards. Treuchtlingen had thus become a small railway junction.

=== Planning, construction and commissioning ===
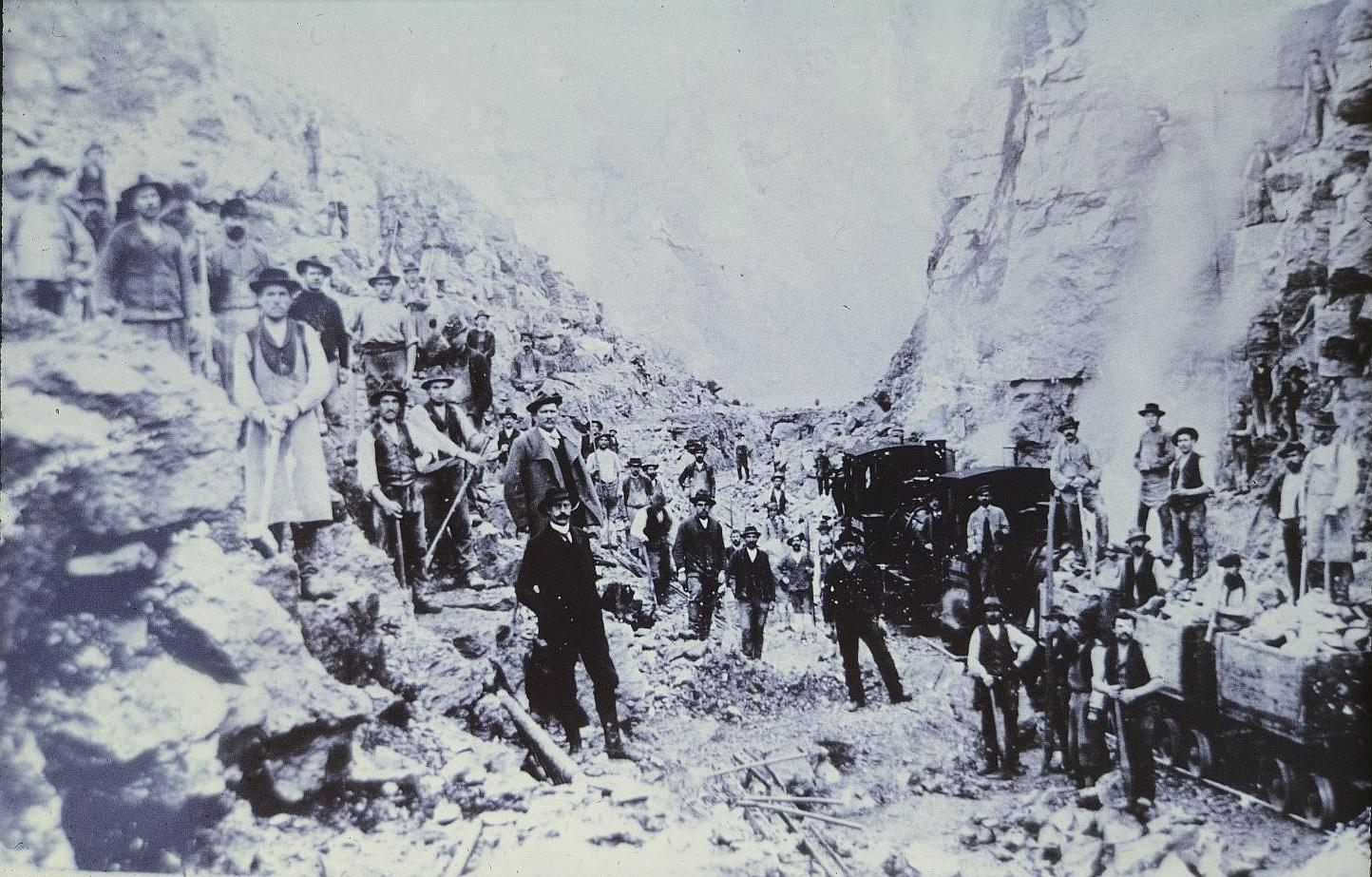
Working on a cutting in the Möhrenbachtal (around 1902)

As a result, planning began again for a direct route between Donauwörth and Treuchtlingen over the Alb. A committee made up of municipalities and companies initially unsuccessfully campaigned for the Bavarian state government to build the connection. It was only when the Munich-Treuchtlingen and Augsburg-Nördlingen-Nürnberg lines reached the limits of their capacity that the Bavarian state government took up the old plans to cross the Alb again. In contrast to the projects from the 1830s, it was now possible to dispense with the costly steep ramps with rope haulage that were designed at the time.

On 11 October 1901, the Bavarian parliament decided to build the Donauwörth–Treuchtlingen line, after land acquisition had begun ten years previously. The construction of the line, which began on 3 November 1903, proved difficult because of the many rock cuttings. Flooding and landslides delayed the work several times. On 1 October 1906, the main line, which was double track from the start, went into operation together with the Fünfstetten–Monheim branch line.

=== Electrification and World War II ===
The line met expectations in the years that followed. As part of the railway axis between Berlin and Rome, Deutsche Reichsbahn began electrification in 1934, which was completed on 5 April 1935.

At the end of the Second World War, Donauwörth and Treuchtlingen stations in particular were hit by heavy bombing raids. On 21 February 1945, more than 300 people died when there was a direct hit on the Treuchtlingen platform underpass, which served as a shelter.

=== Upgrade ===
The first federal transport route plan (Bundesverkehrswegeplan) of 1973 provided for an upgraded route between Würzburg and Augsburg via Nuremberg as one of eight upgrade projects. The line was included as part of the Würzburg–Augsburg upgrade project in its update, the Coordinated Investment Program for the Federal Transport Routes (Koordiniertes Investitionsprogramm für die Bundesverkehrswege) of 1977 and as an "urgent need" in the Federal Transport Route Plan of 1985.

As part of a pilot project in the 1970s, almost all intermediate stops were abandoned and instead a bus route was established to serve the localities. Only the Otting-Weilheim station remained on the entire 35-kilometer line as an access point for passenger traffic.

Between 2004 and 2006, the overhead line, most of which dated back to 1935, was renewed while the line was in operation.

The line is to be equipped with electronic interlockings and the European Train Control System by 2030 as part of the "starter package" of the Digitalen Schiene Deutschland ("Digital Rail Germany"), as part of the Scandinavia-Mediterranean corridor of the TEN core network.

== Route ==
The Donauwörth–Treuchtlingen railway begins at kilometre 0.0 in Donauwörth station. It branches off to the right of the Augsburg–Nördlingen railway, leaves Donauwörth in a northerly direction, crosses the Wörnitz valley, the former route of the line to Nördlingen and federal highway 25 that runs through the valley, and then climbs several kilometres to the slope above the Ellerbach on the Monheimer Alb range of the Franconian Alb. The watershed between the Wörnitz and the Altmühl is crossed at the high point of the line near Otting. From there, the line largely follows the Möhrenbach, which it crosses several times while running through its valley. At the level where the Möhrenbach flows into the Altmühl, the line reaches the Altmühl valley and Treuchtlingen station, where it meets the line from Munich and connects to the lines to Würzburg and to Nuremberg.

=== Operating points ===
There used to be several stations on the Alb, but these have now been largely abandoned. Only Otting-Weilheim is still served by passenger traffic, although the former Mündling station still serves as a crossing loop. Until 1999, the branch line to Monheim branched off in Fünfstetten, which was last operated as a heritage railway.

=== Engineering structures ===
On the southern section, the 150 metre-long Wörnitz Bridge is the longest bridge structure. It is a 3-span fishbelly girder bridge with each track having a separate superstructure.

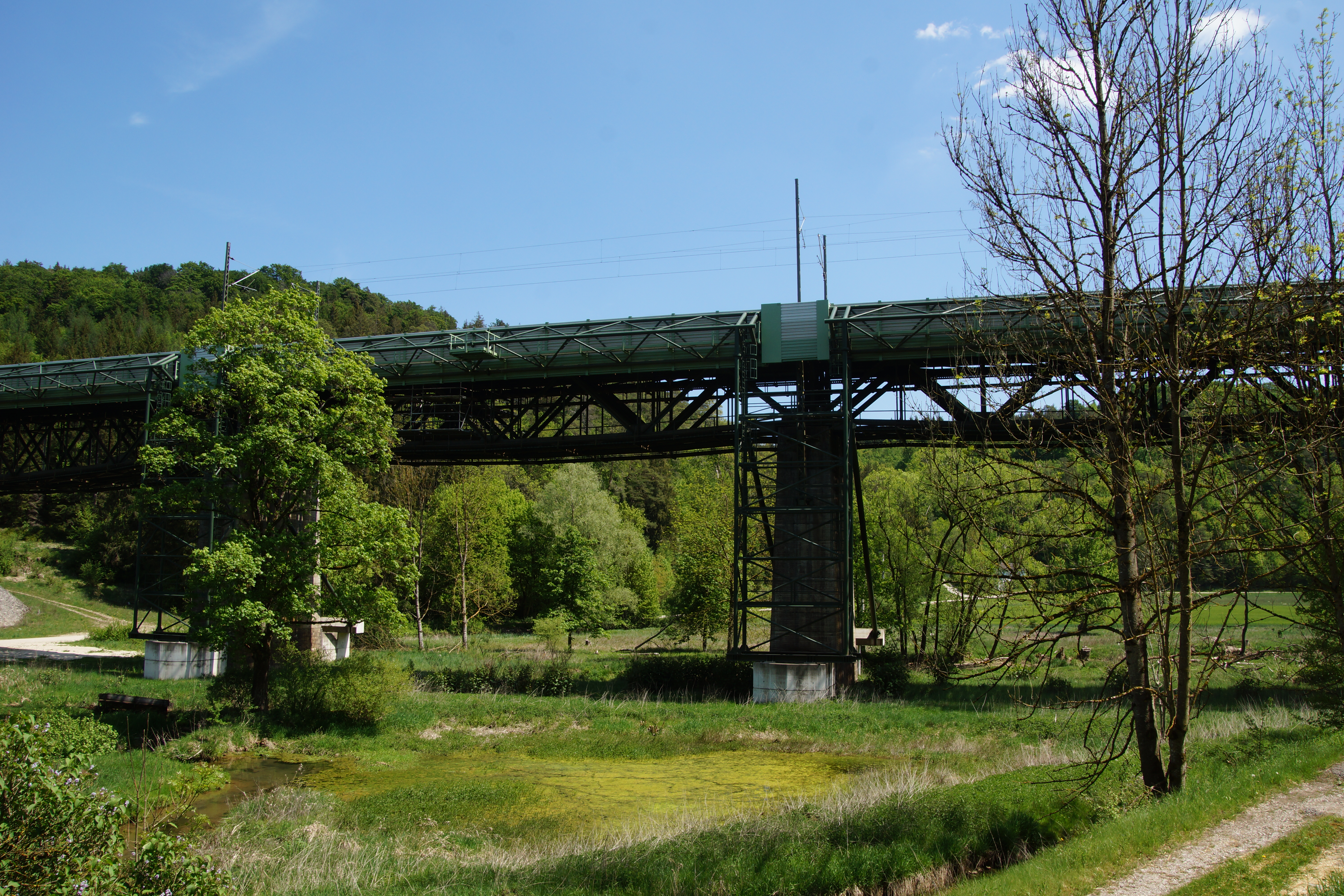
Upper Möhrenbach bridge (2020)

Larger bridges on the northern section are the 183 metre-long Obere Möhrenbachbrücke near Möhren and the Untere Möhrenbachbrücke at Dickmühle. The Obere Möhrenbach Bridge has four spans and, like the Wörnitz Bridge, consists of fish-belly girders and a separate superstructure for each track.

== Rolling stock ==
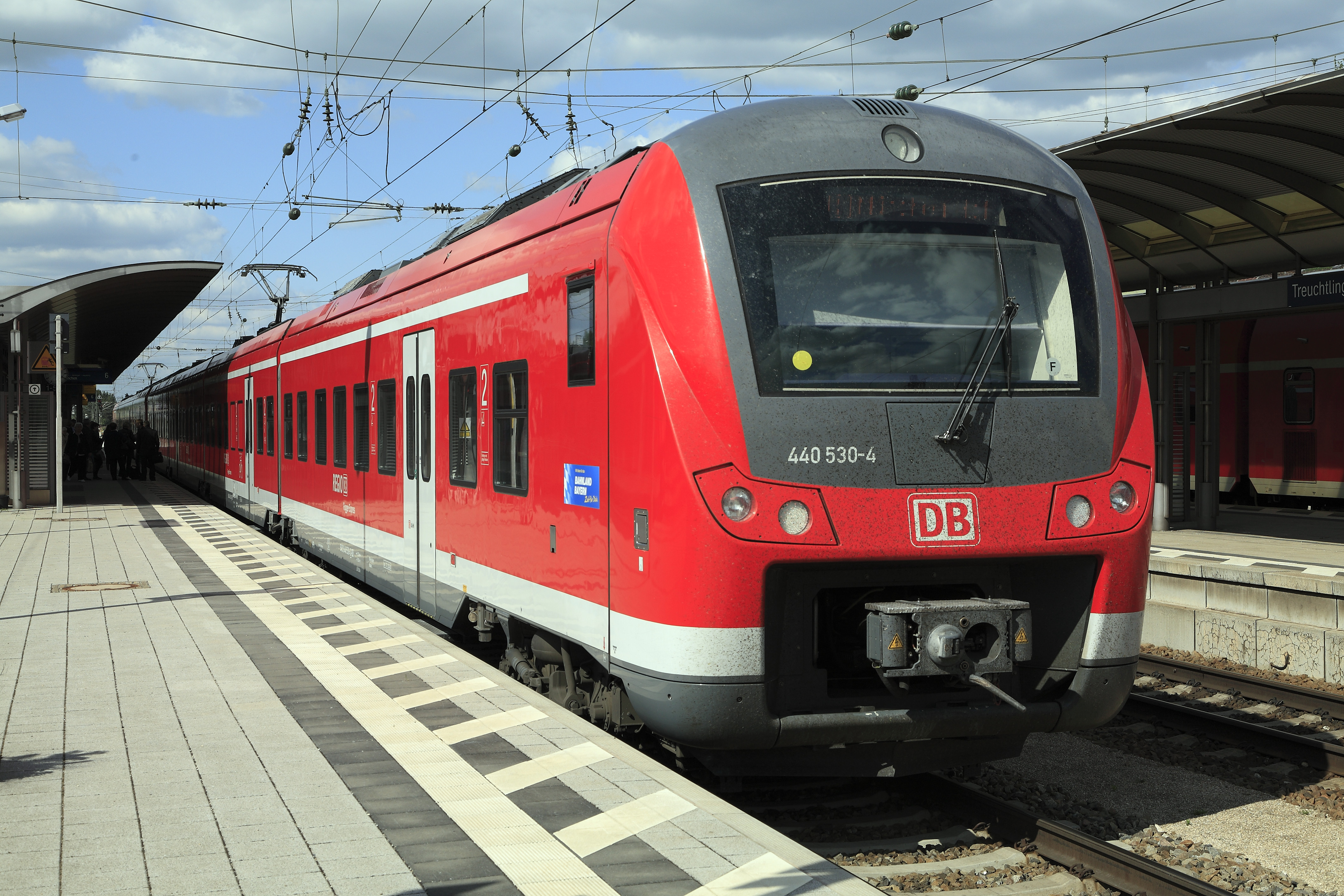
Alstom Coradia Continental (Treuchtlingen, 2012)

In regional traffic, electric locomotives of the 110, 111 and 143 classes with double-deck coaches were used until 2009. From December 2006, Modus carriages (converted from older rolling stock) were also used. Alstom Coradia Continental multiple units (class 440) ran from the end of 2009 to 2022.

Since the timetable change in December 2022, Siemens Mireo and Siemens Desiro HC multiple units have been used for the services operated by Go-Ahead Bayern. The RE 16 is usually operated with Twindexx Vario railcars. Class 612 diesel railcars are used for the Allgäu-Franken-Express.

== Operations ==
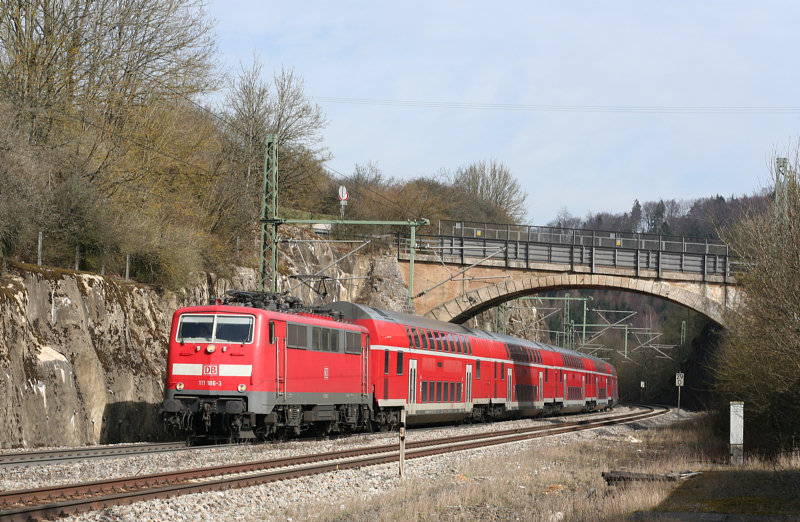
Class 111 hauling double deck carriages of the Nuremberg-Augsburg Regional Express near Möhren (2007)

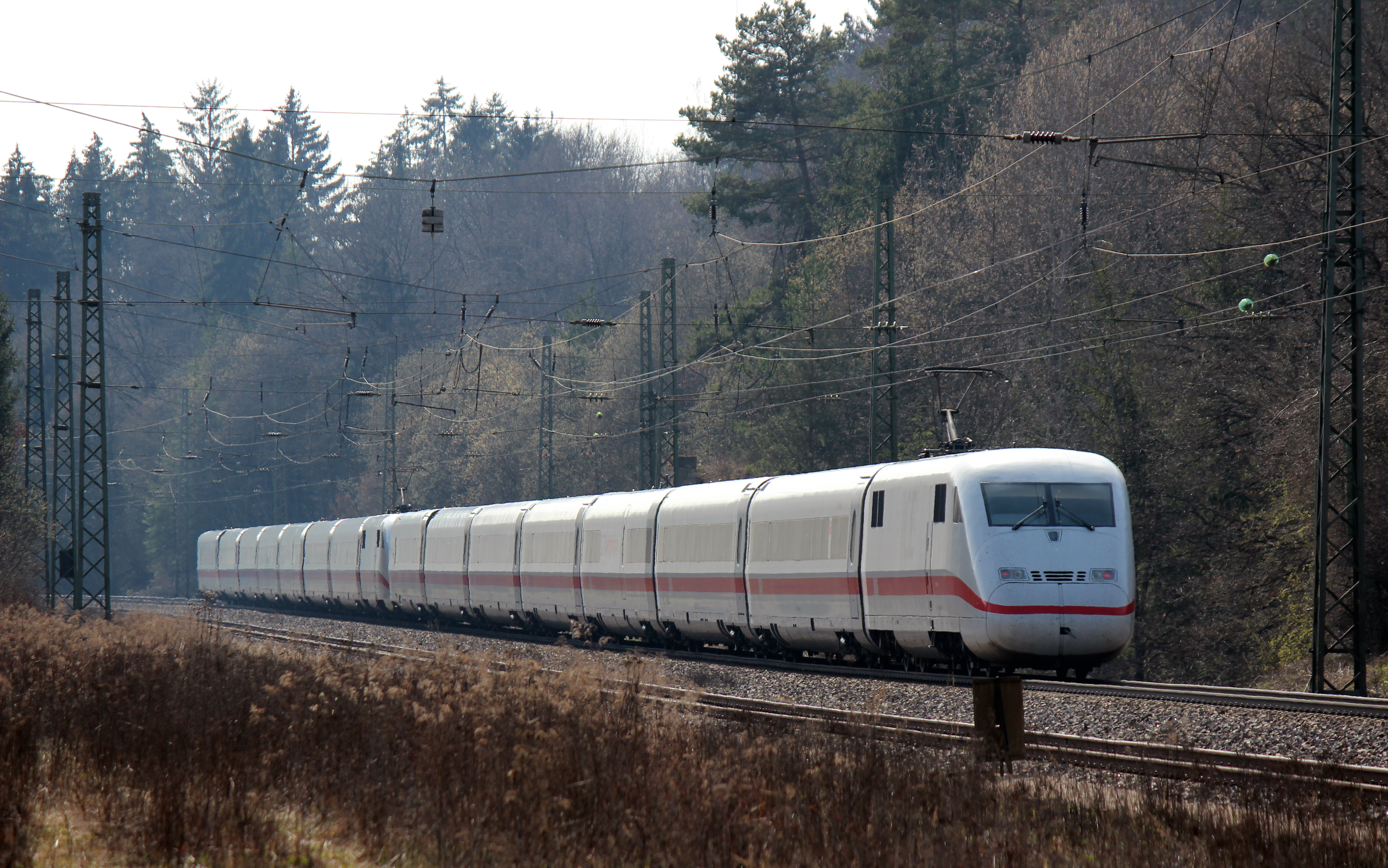
Intercity-Express near Möhren (2014)

The summer timetable of 1939 listed only four local passenger train pairs between Donauwörth and Treuchtlingen, which needed a little less than 40 minutes for the line. In contrast, the line was used by a large number of express trains, some of which did not stop in Donauwörth or Treuchtlingen. Long-distance connections existed in particular between Rome and Berlin or ZSK Sigma Olomoucrich and Berlin with through coaches to Dresden and Breslau and between Merano and Kiel.

The commissioning of the Nuremberg–Ingolstadt high-speed railway in 2006 led to a significant shift in long-distance traffic to the new Munich–Nuremberg route. In long-distance rail passenger transport, Intercity Express and Intercity trains run on the line. Long-distance trains stopping in Donauwörth and Treuchtlingen only serve the route irregularly. However, the line capacities that were freed up could be used to increase the number of trains in regional traffic.

From 2006 to 2020 there were also direct connections between Nuremberg and Lindau and Nuremberg and Oberstdorf with Class 612 diesel multiple units under the Allgäu-Franken-Express name, since the section between Augsburg and Lindau or Oberstdorf is not electrified. The three pairs of trains occasionally stopped in Treuchtlingen and Donauwörth and, after the departure of many Intercity Express and Intercity trains from this route, created a fast connection between Augsburg and the long-distance hub of Nuremberg. The Allgäu-Franken-Express was eventually replaced by the Regional-Express lines RE 7 and RE 17.

Since the timetable change in December 2009, the Fugger-Express has been running between Treuchtlingen and Munich every two hours as a Regional-Express (RE). Since the timetable change in December 2022, these two-hourly trains have been extended to the Würzburg–Treuchtlingen–Donauwörth–Augsburg–Munich route and operated RE 80 by Go Ahead Bayern. Other regional express trains on line RE 16 on the Nuremberg–Treuchtlingen–Donauwörth–Augsburg route increase the number of trains to approximately hourly intervals. Treuchtlingen is today (as of 2023) with a slightly different symmetry minute every hour every half hour in regional traffic, where there are transfer options from the north (Nuremberg and Würzburg) to the south (Augsburg, Ingolstadt and Munich) and in the opposite direction.
