= Augsburg–Nördlingen railway =

Rail line in Germany

Augsburg–Nördlingen

Overview
- Status: Operational
- Owner: Deutsche Bahn
- Line number: 5300
- Locale: Bavaria, Germany
- Termini: Augsburg; Nördlingen

Service
- Type: Heavy rail, Passenger/freight rail Regional rail
- Route number: 910, 989
- Operator(s): DB Bahn

History
- Opened: Stages between 1844 - 1849

Technical
- Line length: 70.137 km (43.581 mi)
- Number of tracks: Single track Double track (Augsburg–Donauworth)
- Track gauge: 1,435 mm (4 ft 8 1/2 in) standard gauge
- Electrification: 15 kV/16.7 Hz AC overhead catenary
- Operating speed: 200 km/h (120 mph)

The Augsburg–Nördlingen railway is an electrified main line in Bavaria, Germany, originally built and operated as part of the Ludwig South-North Railway (Ludwig-Süd-Nord-Bahn) from Lindau to Hof. It runs from Augsburg via Donauwörth to Nördlingen.

The line between Augsburg and Donauwörth is still part of the national long-distance connection between Munich, Augsburg and Nuremberg. Even after the opening of the Nuremberg–Ingolstadt high-speed railway, it is still important for long-distance passenger transport. In the event of disruptions on the high-speed line, it serves as a detour route. Due to the few bends between Donauwörth and Augsburg, scheduled services can operate at speeds of up to 200 km/h.

The section to Nördlingen, together with the Stuttgart-Bad Cannstatt–Nördlingen railway, is part of a direct Donauwörth–Aalen connection and diversion route from Munich to Stuttgart.

== History ==
The first plans for a railway line from Augsburg to Nuremberg arose shortly after the opening of Germany's first railway line, Nuremberg–Fürth, in 1835. At that time, merchants from the Augsburg area founded a joint-stock company for the construction and operation of a line from Augsburg via Donauwörth and Treuchtlingen to Nuremberg. A few years later, however, King Ludwig I announced the construction of a state railway and the company realised that the difficult geological conditions between Donauwörth and Treuchtlingen (Franconian Jura) made it impossible to build and operate a railway line there economically. The company was dissolved in 1841.

=== Route planning and commissioning ===
As a result, the Bavarian government avoided the problem of the Franconian Jura by routing the Ludwig South-North Railway via the Nördlinger Ries. The Bavarian parliament approved the construction on 25 August 1843.

Opening dates were as follows:

- 20 November 1844: Augsburg-Oberhausen – Nordheim (near Donauwörth)
- 1 July 1846: Augsburg – Augsburg-Oberhausen
- 15 September 1847: Nordheim – Donauwörth
- 15 May 1849: Donauwörth – Nördlingen (– Oettingen)

=== First years of operation ===
During the construction of the Danube Valley Railway from Ingolstadt to Neuoffingen, the line in Donauwörth was extensively rerouted in 1877. The old line east of the old town with a tunnel was abandoned.

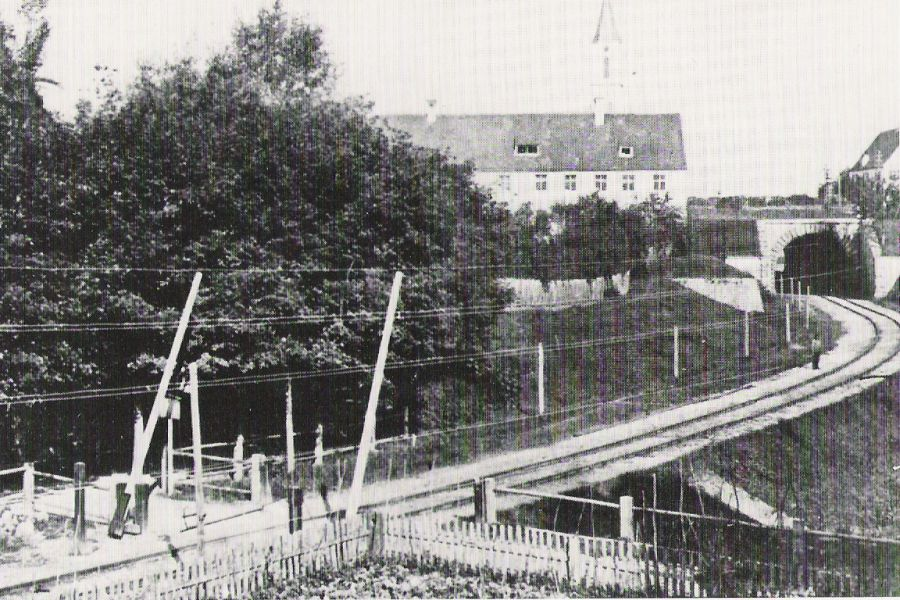
Until 1877, the only tunnel on the line was on the old route in Donauwörth.

The Donauwörth–Treuchtlingen railway across the Franconian Jura, which had been planned since 1835, was opened on 1 October 1906. This significantly shortened the railway link between Munich and Nuremberg. From then on, the section between Donauwörth and Nördlingen only handled through traffic towards Stuttgart.

=== Electrification and expansion ===
Construction work to electrify the line from Augsburg to Donauwörth and on to Nuremberg via Treuchtlingen began in 1933 and was completed on 10 May 1935. The section from Donauwörth to Nördlingen and on to Stuttgart has also been operated electrically since 1972.

The first Federal Transport Infrastructure Plan (Bundesverkehrswegeplan) in 1973 provided for an upgraded line between Würzburg and Augsburg via Nuremberg as one of eight upgrade projects. The line was included as part of the Würzburg–Augsburg line upgrade in its update, the Coordinated Investment Program for Federal Transport Routes of 1977 and as an "urgent need" in the Federal Transport Infrastructure Plan 1985.

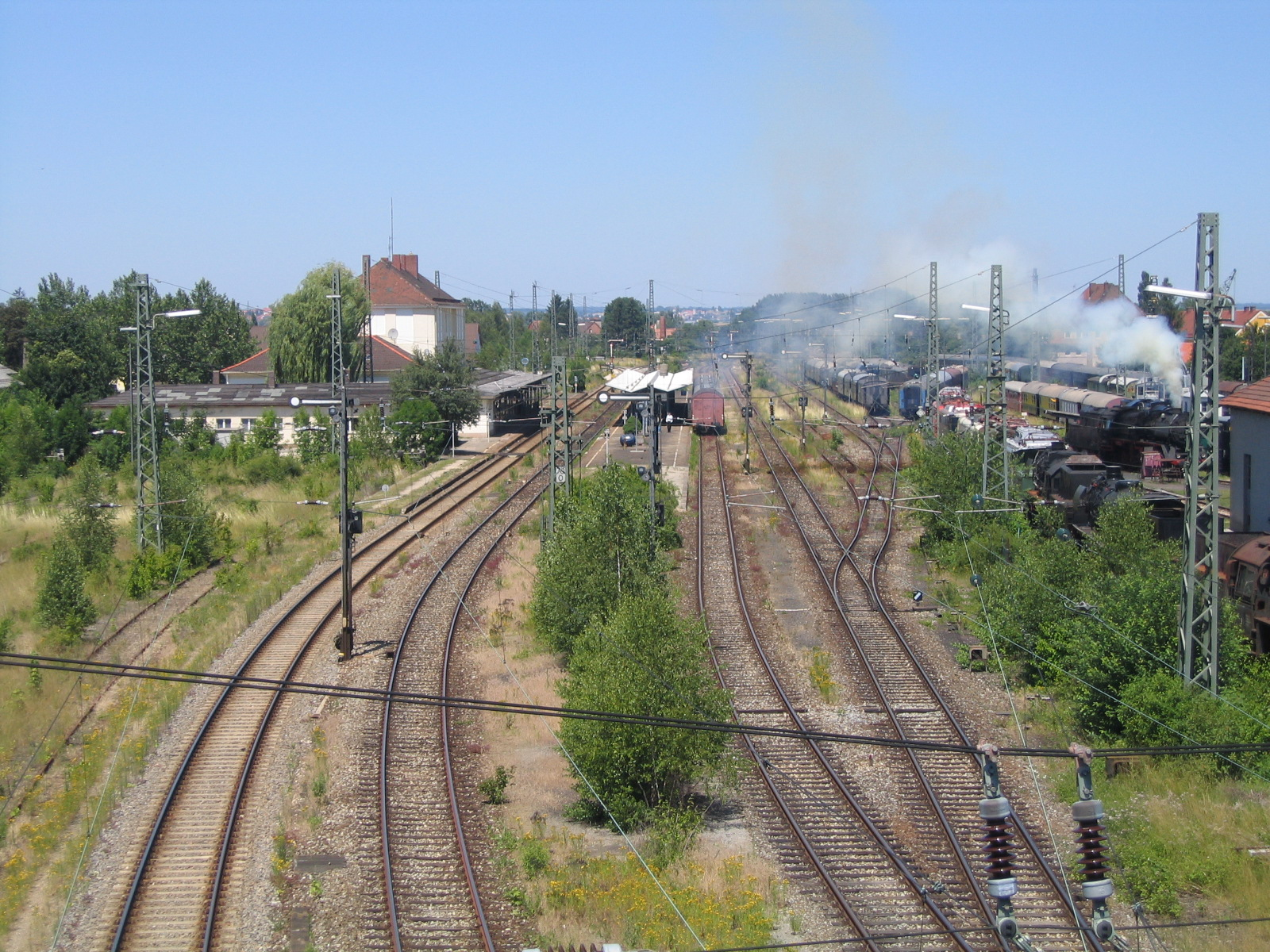
Noerdlingen station. The former depot is reused as the Bavarian Railway Museum. (2006)

The 36.5 km section between Augsburg-Oberhausen and Donauwörth was approved for speeds of 200 km/h on two sections in 1978 and 1981. The upgraded section was one of the first lines in Germany to reach this speed.

In November 2018, the construction of a third track for the section between Augsburg and Donauwörth was classified as an "urgent need" in the Federal Transport Infrastructure Plan 2030. Expenditure of €488 million is planned for the upgrade of the line.

The Donauwörth–Harburg section was completely closed for modernisation work from 8 July to 14 November 2022 and the Harburg–Nördlingen section was also closed from 30 July 2022 to 11 August 2022.

Harburg (Schwab) Hp station was built between the level crossings of Mündlinger Straße and Wemdinger Straße near Märkerpark in 2022 to improve its accessibility by passenger from the centre of the town of Harburg (Swabia). Deutsche Bahn built a 140-metre-long outside platform with a platform height of 760 millimetres above the top edge of the rails to the west of the track with barrier-free access from the north and south. The town of Harburg built a parking lot and bicycle parking spaces nearby. With the timetable change in December 2022, the operation of local passenger transport began with the simultaneous elimination of stops at Harburg (Schwab) station, where the dismantling of the platforms was planned for early 2023.

=== The Augsburg–Donauwörth section as a test route ===
The Augsburg–Donauwörth section, which was upgraded in the late 1970s for a line speed of 200 km/h, is regularly used by DB and private companies as a test track for new rail transport technologies.

The section has been equipped with the Sk signal system since 1977, with which the Deutsche Bundesbahn planned to replace the outdated H/V signal system. The introduction of the Ks signals in 1993 rendered the system obsolete, but the signals are still in use today.

On 17 October 1984, a DB train hauled by locomotive 120 001 set a new world record for three-phase vehicles at 265 km/h on a test run with three carriages (load: around 250 t).

When testing a new, air-sprung bogie for high-speed traffic in 1993, a speed of 333 km/h was reached.

In 2001, the prototype of an actively controlled pantograph was tested.

== Route ==
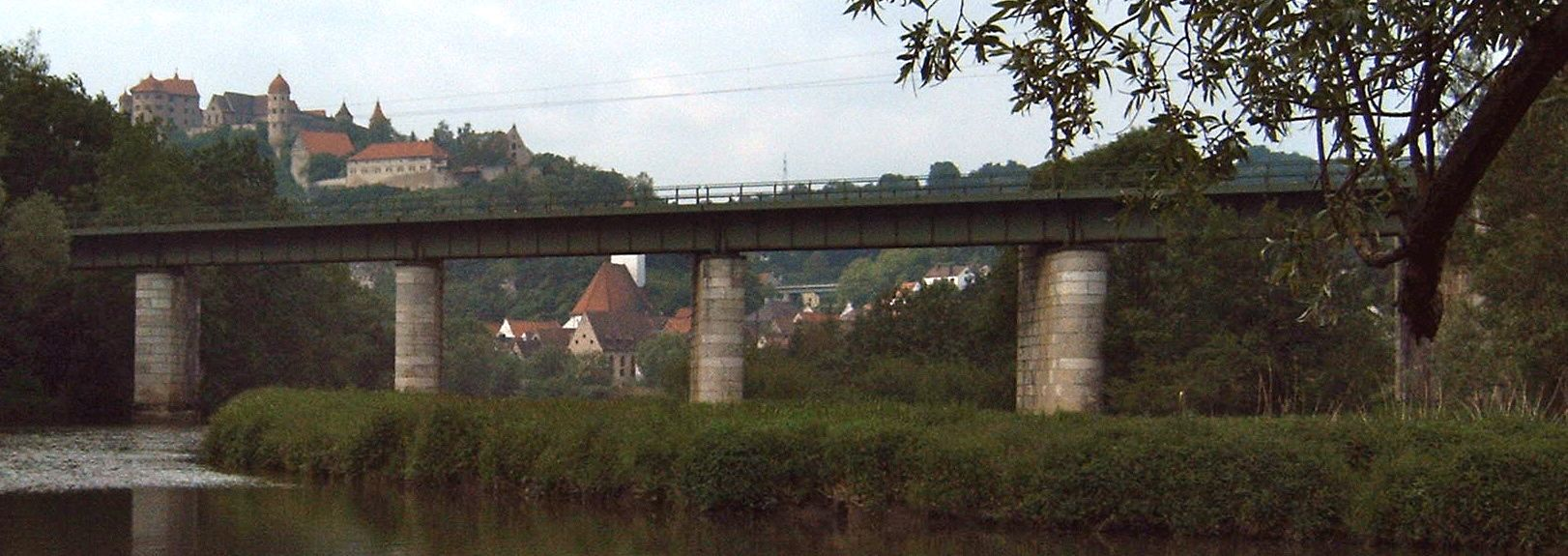
Bridge over the Wörnitz in Harburg (2006)

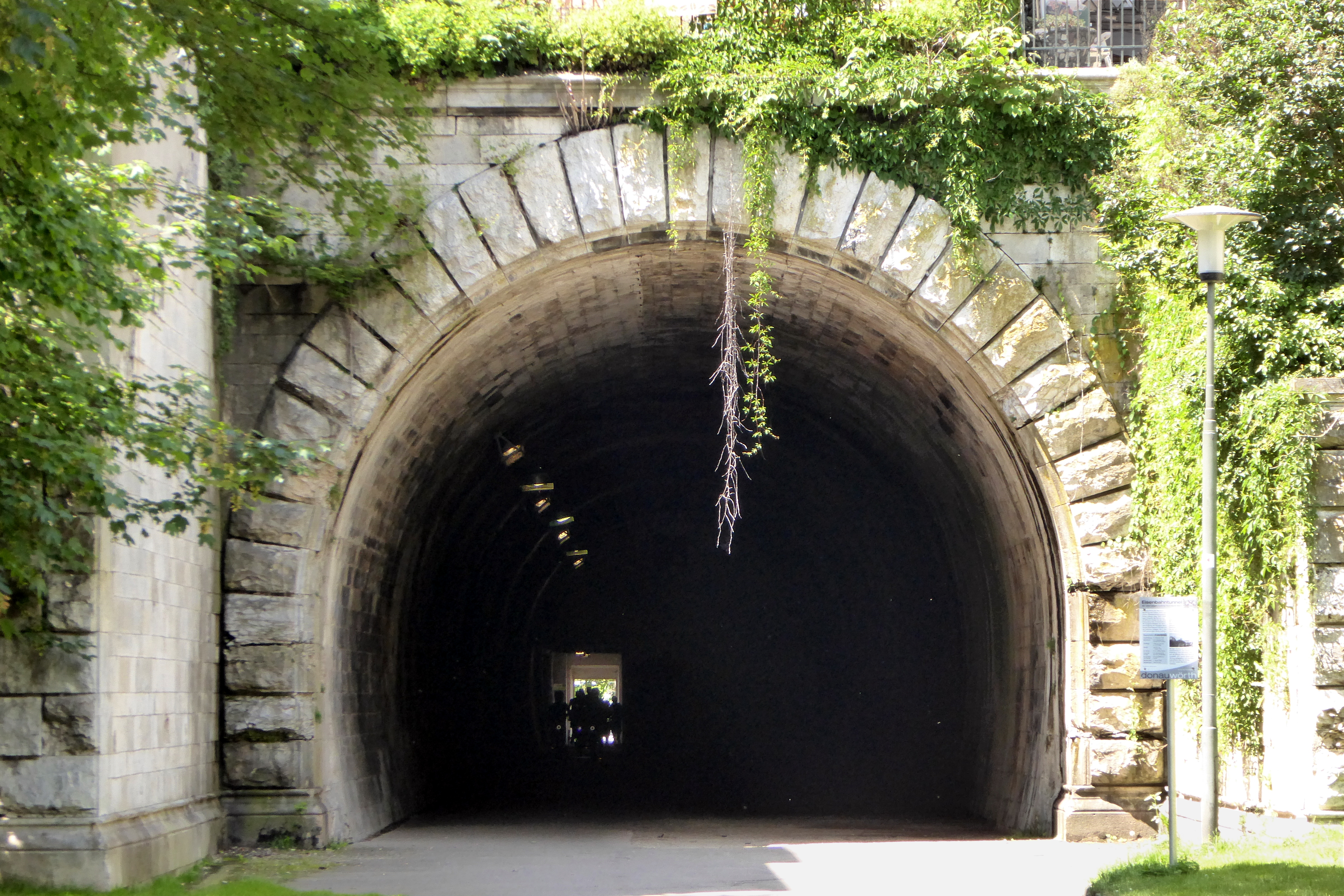
The Donauwörth tunnel, which was abandoned in 1877, photographed in 2016

The line leaves Augsburg Hauptbahnhof in a northerly direction and crosses the Augsburger Localbahn and the Wertach while still in the city area. Until 1933, the lines to Ulm and Welden branched off directly to the west at Augsburg-Oberhausen station before the branch was rebuilt at the northern end of Oberhausen station. In the urban area of Augsburg, the older line was retained to connect to the track construction yard. Since 1933, the line to Ulm has curved to the right and then crossed the line westwards with two flyover structures. The line towards Nördlingen then crosses autobahn 8 and federal highway 2. A short industrial railway to the Lech steel works begins at Herbertshofen. Together with the Ingolstadt–Neuoffingen railway, the line crosses the Danube and reaches Donauwörth from the south.

From Donauwörth to Harburg, the line follows the valley of the Wörnitz to the northwest, while the Donauwörth–Treuchtlingen railway, which has been running towards Nuremberg since 1906, leaves Donauwörth to the north. In the further course of the line to Harburg, the Wörnitz is crossed several times with large bridges. The line then runs almost in a straight line through the Nördlinger Ries to its end in Nördlingen, which is why this section is also known as part of the Riesbahn ("Ries railway").

The old route in Donauwörth left the current route near Nordheim and crossed the Danube a little downstream on its own bridge. Donauwörth station was immediately east of the old town. After the station, the line ran through a short tunnel and then made a wide arc westwards. At Wörnitzstein, the line crossed the Wörnitz for the first time and then merged into today's line.

== Operations ==
Long-distance Intercity-Express and Intercity trains run on the Augsburg–Donauwörth section.

After an invitation to tender as part of the so-called E-Netz Augsburg, regional trains were operated by DB Regio as the "Fugger Express" on the Munich–Treuchtlingen, Munich–Donauwörth and Donauwörth–Nördlingen–Aalen lines from 2009.

In December 2022, Go-Ahead Bayern took over lot 1 of the Augsburg network as the successor to the Fugger Express. On the southern section between Donauwörth and Augsburg, the RE 80 (Würzburg – Treuchtlingen – Donauwörth – Augsburg – Munich) runs every two hours. It is split/joined with the RE 89 from/to Aalen in Donauwörth. The RE 16 (Nuremberg – Treuchtlingen – Donauwörth – Augsburg) also runs on the line every two hours, so that these Regional-Express lines overlap at hourly intervals between Treuchtlingen, Donauwörth and Augsburg. There are also RB 87 Regionalbahn trains on the Donauwörth – Augsburg – Munich route. This are extra services between Augsburg and Meitingen, creating a service every half hour. This means there are two regional trains every hour between Donauwörth and Augsburg.

On the western section, the RE 89 runs every two hours on the Munich–Augsburg–Donauwörth–Nördlingen–Aalen route, which is supplemented by the RB 89 on the Donauwörth–Nördlingen–Aalen route on this section at hourly intervals. These are supplemented every half hour during the peak hour between Nördlingen and Donauwörth.

From 2006 to 2020 there was a direct connection between Nuremberg and Lindau and Nuremberg and Oberstdorf under the name Allgäu-Franken-Express. Three pairs of trains occasionally stopped in Treuchtlingen and Donauwörth and, after the departure of many Intercity Express and Intercity trains from this route, created the fast connection between Augsburg and the long-distance hub in Nuremberg. The Allgäu-Franken-Express was eventually replaced by the regional express lines RE 7 and RE 17.
