= Haspelmoor station =

Railway station in Germany

Haspelmoor
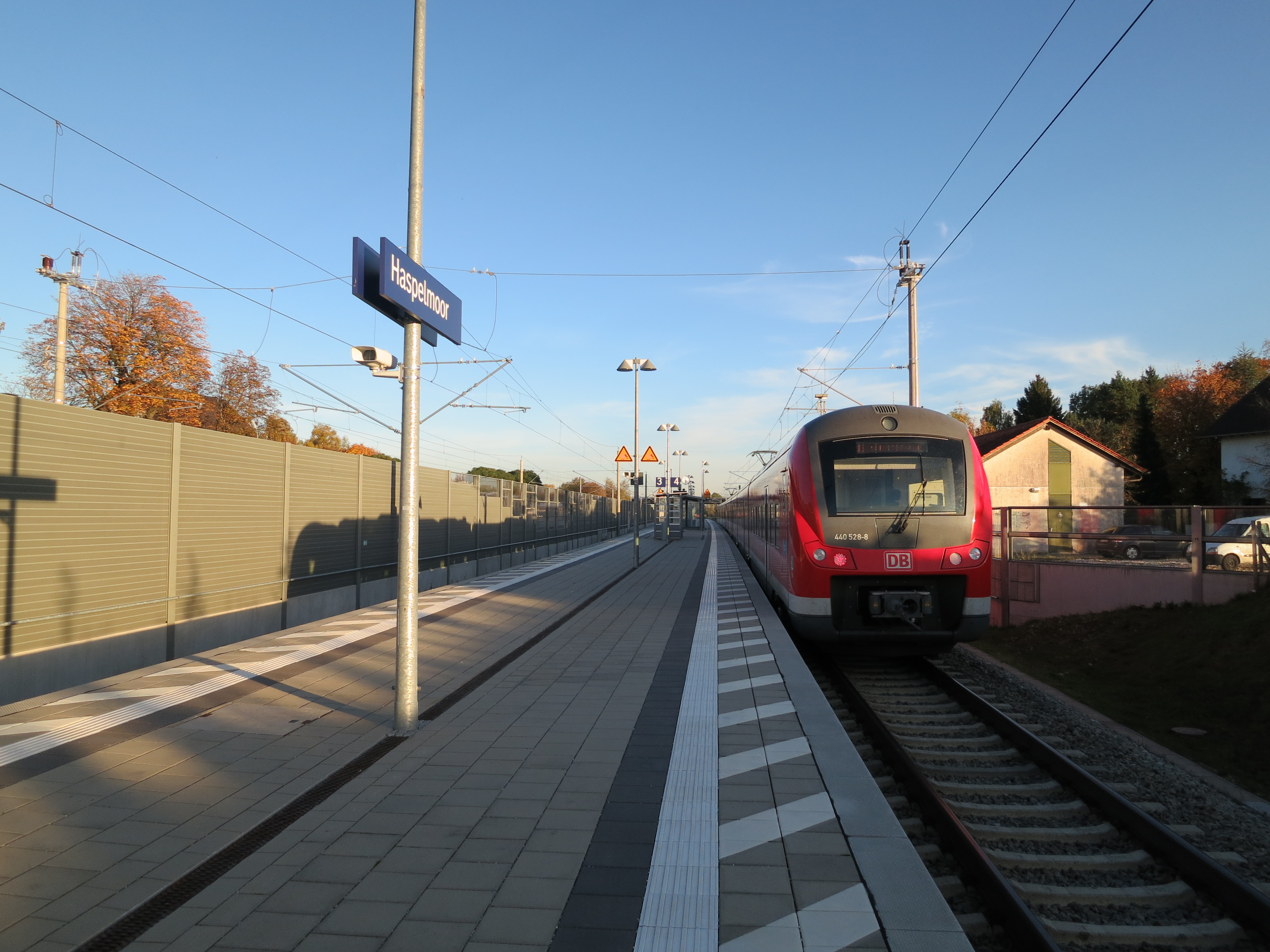

General information
- Location: Bahnhofstraße 2; 82285 Hattenhofen; Bavaria; Germany
- Coordinates: 48°13′23.4″N 11°05′54.6″E
- System: Hp
- Owner: Deutsche Bahn
- Operator: DB Netz; DB Station&Service
- Line: Munich–Augsburg railway
- Train operators: Go-Ahead Bayern
- Connections: 839 889

Other information
- Station code: 2579
- DS100 code: MHMR
- IBNR: 8002623
- Category: 6
- Fare zone: : 4; : 50 and 60 (MVV transitional tariff)
- Website: www.bahnhof.de

Services
Preceding station		Following station
Althegnenberg towards Dinkelscherben	RB 86	Mammendorf towards München Hbf
Althegnenberg towards Donauwörth	RB 87	Mammendorf towards München Hbf
Location
- Location within Bavaria Location within Germany Location within Europe

Haspelmoor station is a railway station in the Haspelmoor district of the municipality of Hattenhofen, located in the district of Fürstenfeldbruck in Upper Bavaria, Germany.
