= Maisach station =

Railway station in Germany

Maisach

General information
- Location: Bahnhofstraße 20; 82216 Maisach; Bavaria; Germany
- Coordinates: 48.2142°N 11.2555°E
- Owner: DB Netz
- Operator: DB Station&Service
- Lines: Munich–Augsburg railway (KBS 999.3)
- Train operators: S-Bahn München
- Connections: 871, 872, 873, 875, 7030, 8700

Other information
- Station code: 3909
- DS100 code: MMA
- IBNR: 8003824
- Category: 4
- Fare zone: : 2 and 3
- Website: www.bahnhof.de

Services
Preceding station	Munich S-Bahn	Following station
Malching (Oberbay) towards Mammendorf	S3	Gernlinden towards Holzkirchen
Location
- Location within Bavaria Location within Germany Location within Europe

Maisach station is a railway station in the municipality of Maisach, located in the district of Fürstenfeldbruck in Upper Bavaria, Germany.
