= Althegnenberg station =

Railway station in Germany

Althegnenberg

General information
- Location: Hochdorfer Straße 4; 82278 Althegnenberg; Bavaria; Germany
- Coordinates: 48°14′10.9″N 11°03′46.8″E
- System: Hp
- Owner: Deutsche Bahn
- Operator: DB Netz; DB Station&Service
- Line: Munich–Augsburg railway
- Train operators: Go-Ahead Bayern
- Connections: 839

Other information
- Station code: 117
- DS100 code: MAHB
- IBNR: 8000545
- Category: 5
- Fare zone: : 50; : 4
- Website: www.bahnhof.de

Services
Preceding station		Following station
Mering towards Dinkelscherben	RB 86	Haspelmoor towards München Hbf
Mering towards Donauwörth	RB 87	Haspelmoor towards München Hbf
Location
- Location within Bavaria Location within Germany Location within Europe

Althegnenberg station is a railway station in the municipality of Althegnenberg, located in the district of Fürstenfeldbruck in Upper Bavaria, Germany.
