= Bauernhofmuseum Jexhof =

Museum in Bavaria, Germany

Coordinates: 48.1160°N 11.2063°E

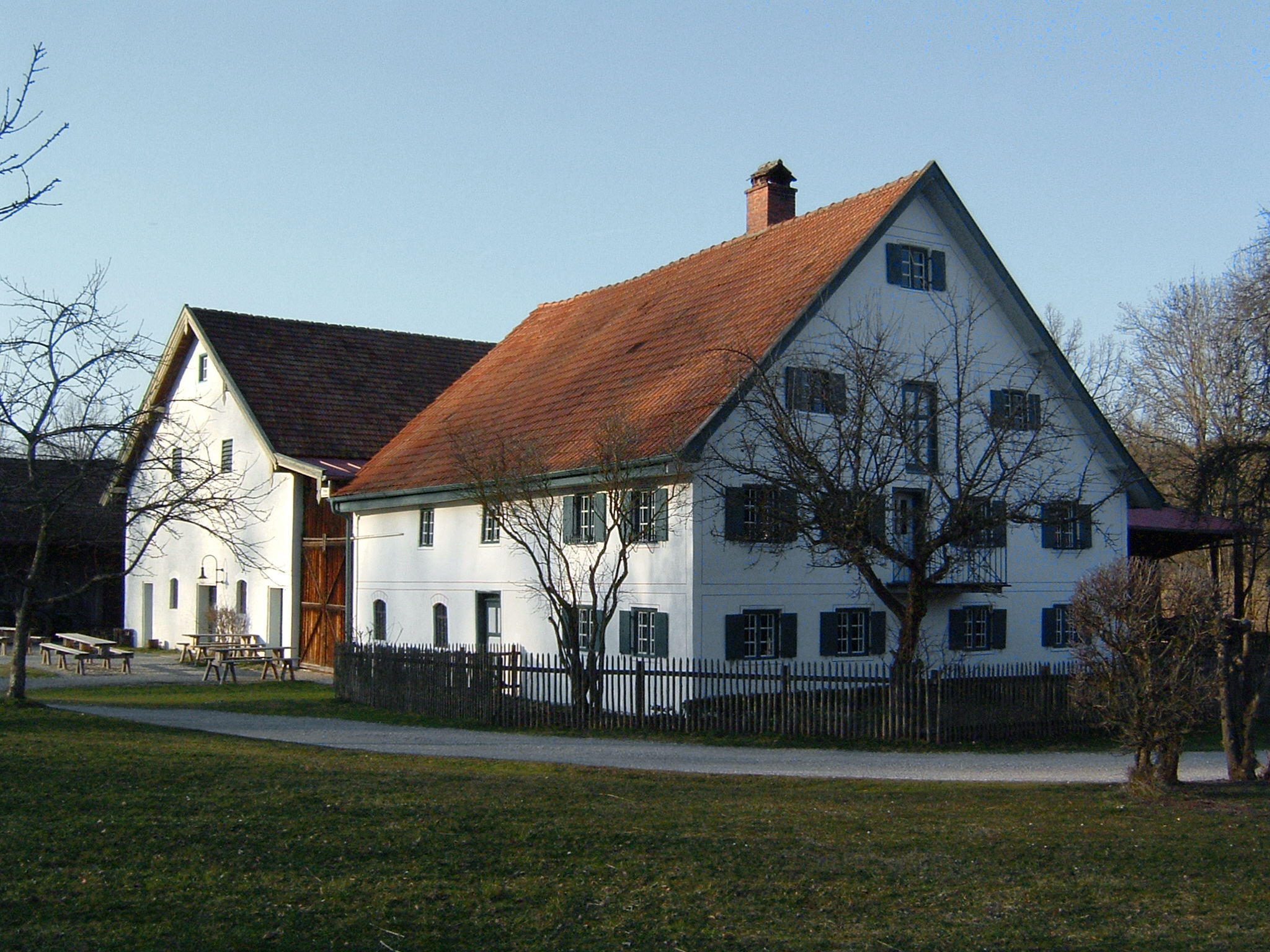
Residential house with stable

Bauernhofmuseum Jexhof is a farm museum located in the southern part of the Fürstenfeldbruck District in Bavaria, Germany. It lies approximately 700 meters southeast of the district road FFB 7, which runs between Schöngeising and Mauern (part of the community of Grafrath). Located in the hamlet of Jexhof within the Schöngeising municipality, the farm sits in a valley at the western edge of the Wildmoos nature reserve. The museum is part of the "Landpartie – Museums around Munich" network and is operated by the Fürstenfeldbruck District,with additional support from the Jexhof Association.

== History ==
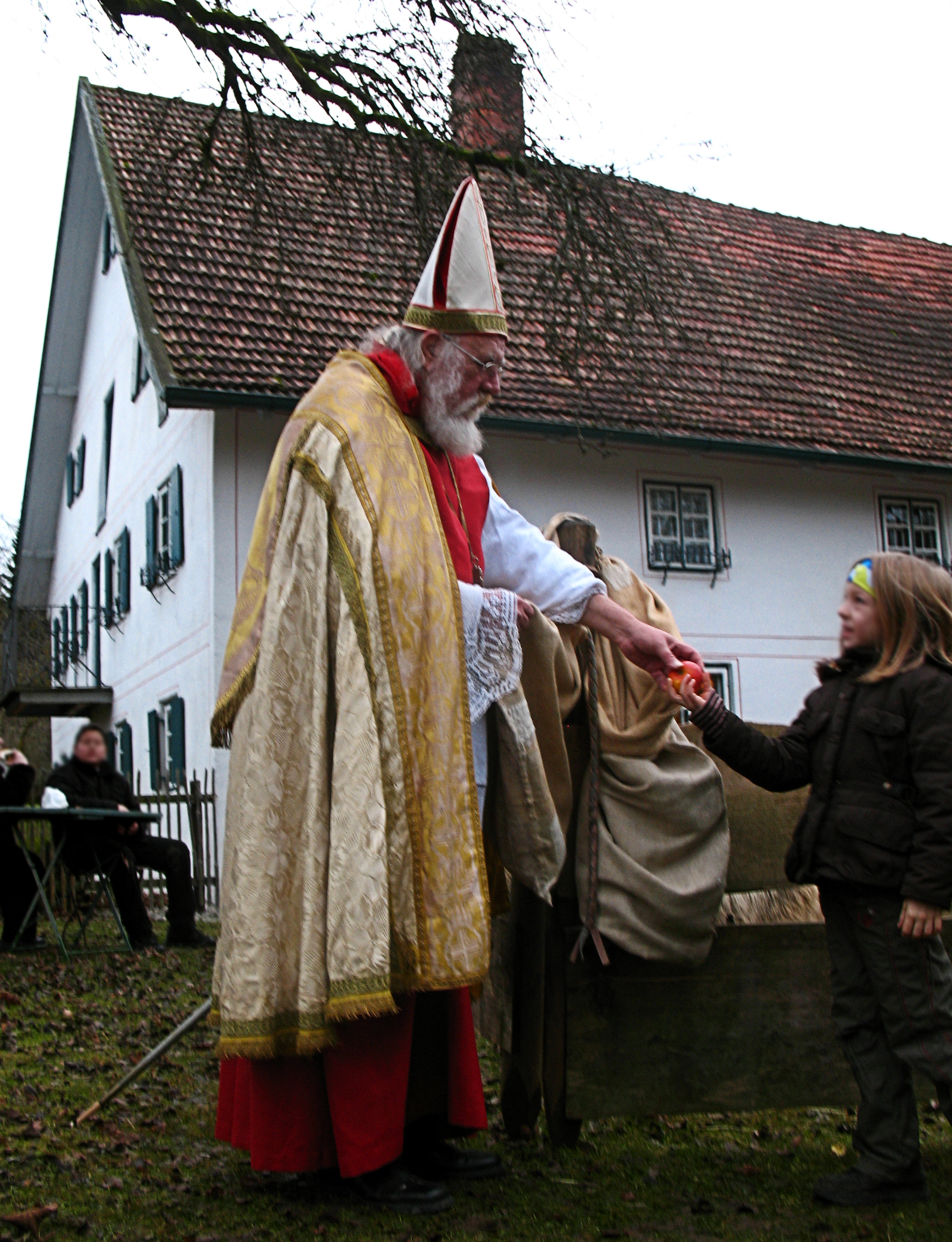
Traditional St. Nicholas at the children's party

The history of Jexhof dates back to 1433, as evidenced by a purchase contract mentioning the three-sided farmstead (Dreiseithof). Between 1564 and 1803, the farm was part of the Fürstenfeld Monastery's holdings, encompassing 400 acres (about 160 hectares) of beech forest. During this period, the monastery leased the farm and its surrounding woodlands for cultivation.

The Schneider family, tenants of Jexhof since the mid-17th century, built the residential house and horse stable around 1775. In 1862, Josef Riedl purchased the farm from its then-owner, Stefan Schmid, for 12,300 guilders. The property, which included 88 acres (36 hectares) of land, remained in the Riedl family for three generations. Most of the current structures and features of the farmstead were built during the Riedl family’s ownership. A former maid who had worked for the family since 1930 continued living at the farm until 1980.

== Farm museum ==
Efforts to preserve the farm began in 1983 under the Jexhof Association. In 1987, ownership of the property was transferred to the Fürstenfeldbruck District, which officially opened the Jexhof Farm Museum that same year. Copies of historical documents related to the farm are exhibited within the museum. The museum portrays rural life at the beginning of the 20th century. In addition to the permanently accessible buildings and rooms of the farm, there are regular special exhibitions on regional topics. Periodic action days are organized to demonstrate life from a hundred years ago. Visitors can, for example, wash, iron, and dry laundry without washing machines and electricity, using a fire-heated wash kettle, washboard, and soap.

=== Layout ===
The farm complex consists of:

- The barn-stable, which serves as the entrance building today
- The horse engine house (Göpelhaus)
- A residential house, built around 1775, consisting of a living room, kitchen, pantry, storage cellar, bedroom, upper hallway, servant's room, maid's room, hayloft, and horse stable
- The bakehouse, built around 1891

=== Sound path (Klangweg) ===
Since 2014, visitors can take a sound path when walking to Jexhof. This path, created in collaboration with the Heinrich-Scherrer Music School for Schöngeising's 1250th anniversary, is a mix of an adventure trail, art installation, and forest playground. Among the sound objects on the path are a xylophone mammoth and giant listening tubes.

=== Exhibitions ===
In addition to the permanent exhibition, regular special exhibitions are presented. Past special exhibitions include:

- In 2014, there were three special exhibitions: "The Forest in the Bruck Region: Forestry – Hunting – Nature", "Great War and Small Village: World War I in the Countryside", and the Christmas exhibition "The World in Miniature: Toys from the Ore Mountains".
- In 2015, the exhibition "The Amper: History of a River" covered the natural and cultural history of the river valley from Lake Ammersee to Olching. The Amper exhibition was part of the "Water" project by the "Landpartie – Museums around Munich" association. Due to a great response, the special exhibition about World War I, titled "Great War and Small Village", was extended for an additional year.
- December 4, 2015, to January 31, 2016: "Ali Mitgutsch: Discovering a Colorful World of Stories, from Picture Puzzles to Dream Boxes"
- December 2, 2016, to January 29, 2017: "Aid for the Heathens: Overseas Missions, Homeland, and the Image of Africa (1887–1965)". The exhibition focused on the Christianization of the so-called heathens in Africa (Afrikamission) and told stories of people from the district who embarked on journeys there.
- May 19 to November 5, 2017: "Clothes Make the Man"
- December 8, 2017, to February 11, 2018: "Janosch: From Ammersee to Panama"
- December 7, 2018, to February 17, 2019: "Straw into Gold: Fairy Tales and Rural Life"
- December 17, 2019, to February 23, 2020: "Ignatius Taschner, the Restless Multitalent: Sculptor, Illustrator, and Artisan Around 1900"
- July 2, 2020, to May 2, 2021: "Ice Ages: Glaciers, Mammoths, and Moraines"

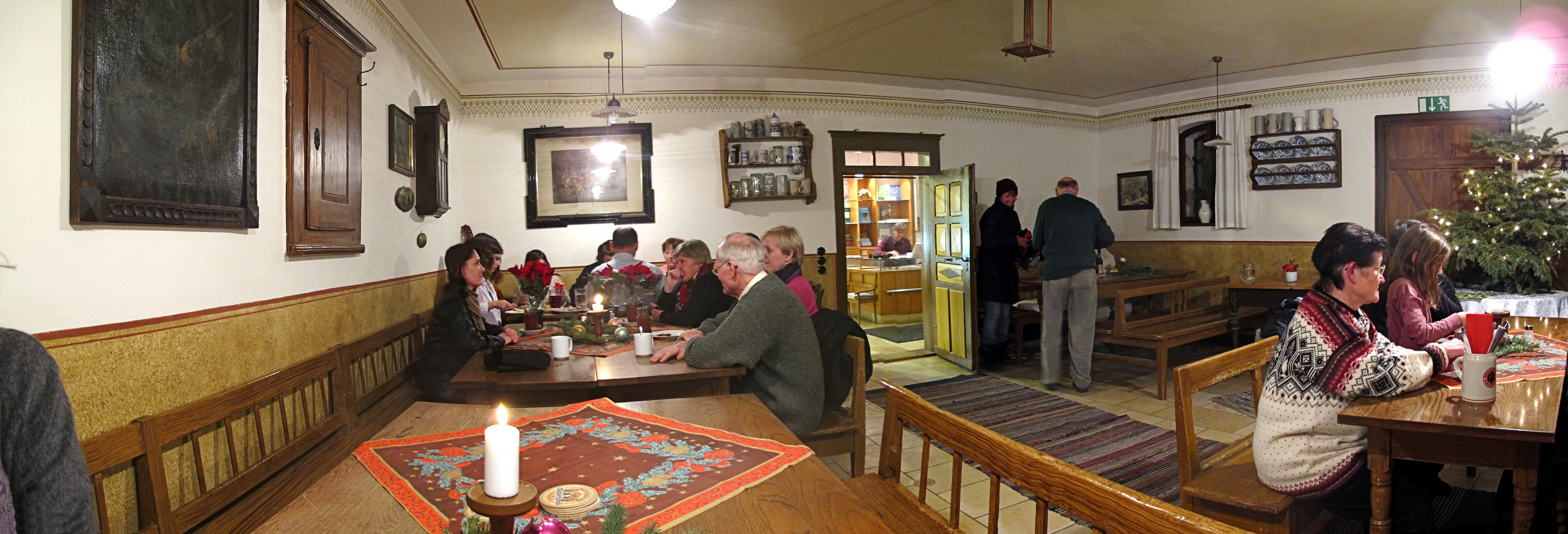
The living room of the house at a Christmas event in 2011
