= Lebenszentrum Adelshofen =

Coordinates: 49.1681°N 8.8939°E

Lebenszentrum Adelshofen is a Protestant evangelical community, a theological seminary and a convention center in Eppingen Adelshofen, Germany.

== History ==
The origins of the Lebenszentrum lie in a spiritual awakening in 1955 in the local church parish under the pastor during that time and founder Dr. Otto Riecker. The Bible college Adelshofen emerged from this awakening From this grew the Kommunität Adelshofen 1962, a Protestant brother-and sisterhood. Funded mostly from donations, it was possible to add buildings for various conferences and conventions over the years in addition to living facilities.

== Kommunität ==
The Kommunität Adelshofen is an evangelical community similar to an order. It currently has 22 celibate sisters and 9 brothers. Together with salaried employees, they are responsible for the Lebenszentrum. In addition to fulfilling their manifold roles in the Lebenszentrum (teaching at the Theological Seminary Adelshofen, retreats, events, conventions and the kitchen and home economics), the sisters and brothers are preaching in various churches and Christian communities. Attached to the celibate community are a family community and a community of three women.

== Theological Seminary ==
The Theological Seminary Adelshofen provides both theological degrees (Bachelor equivalent. Masters in cooperation with UNISA) and also conferences and seminars for laymen.

== Team of the year ==
The Team of the year is a discipleship program for young Christians aged 18 to 24, who serve at the Lebenszentrum in form of a voluntary social year of civil service

== Seminars ==
The Lebenszentrum offers holiday programs, seminar weeks and day seminars for children, teenagers, young adults and families. Content focus is the training of ministers and laymen in the church. On request, the Lebenszentrum organizes and implements missionary weeks in churches and special events either in form of individuals or as a team. In addition to the services in the church growth area Christian counseling is also an important part of the ministry.
