= Adelshofen =

Adelshofen may refer to the following places in Germany:

- Adelshofen, Middle Franconia, in the district of Ansbach, Bavaria
- Adelshofen, Upper Bavaria, in the district of Fürstenfeldbruck, Bavaria
- Adelshofen, Eppingen, a district of Eppingen, Baden-Württemberg
