= Swing Cirrus =

German paraglider

Cirrus

General information
- Type: Paraglider
- National origin: Germany
- Manufacturer: Swing Flugsportgeräte
- Status: Production completed

History
- Manufactured: 1990s - mid 2000s

The Cirrus is a German single-place paraglider that was designed and produced by Swing Flugsportgeräte of Landsberied, near the Bavarian Alps. It is now out of production.

== Design and development ==
The Cirrus was designed as an advanced and cross country glider.

The design progressed through several generations of models, each improving on the last. The models are each named for their approximate projected wing area in square metres.

== Variants ==
Cirrus 3 24
Mid-sized model for lighter pilots. Its 12.6 m (41.3 ft) span wing has a wing area of 27.5 m^{2} (296 sq ft), 75 cells and the aspect ratio is 5.8:1. The pilot weight range is 80 to 105 kg (176 to 231 lb). The glider model is Deutscher Hängegleiterverband e.V. (DHV) 2-3 certified.
Cirrus 3 26
Large-sized model for heavy-weight pilots. Its 13.2 m (43.3 ft) span wing has a wing area of 30 m^{2} (320 sq ft), 75 cells and the aspect ratio is 5.8:1. The pilot weight range is 100 to 125 kg (220 to 276 lb). The glider model is DHV 2-3 certified.

== Specifications (Cirrus 3 24) ==
Data from Bertrand

General characteristics

- Crew: one
- Wingspan: 12.6 m (41 ft 4 in)
- Wing area: 27.5 m^{2} (296 sq ft)
- Aspect ratio: 5.8:1

Performance

- Maximum speed: 54 km/h (34 mph, 29 kn)
- Rate of sink: 1.0 m/s (200 ft/min)
