= Burgstall Gegenpoint =

Coordinates: 48°10′16.4″N 11°16′20.7″E

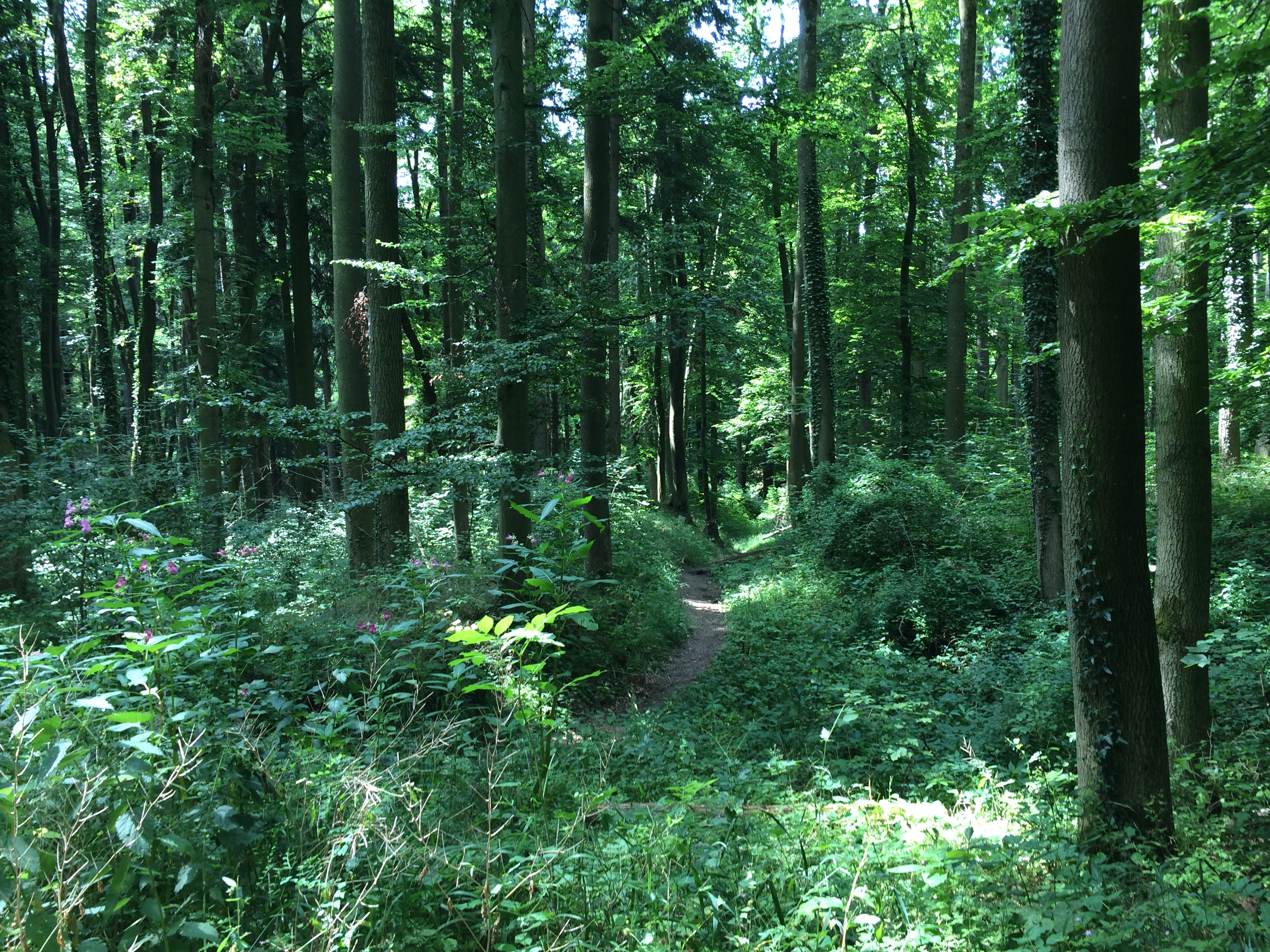

General information
- Location: Emmering, Germany
- Estimated completion: ca. 1147
- Demolished: ca. 1397
- Owner: Das Bayerische Landesamt für Denkmalpflege

The Gegenpoint Castle Site (German: Burgstall Gegenpoint, also spelled Geggenpoint or Kekenpoint, and even earlier spelled Kekkepiunt, Kekinpiunt or Geckenpoint) is the burgstall or site of a ruined spur castle from the high Middle Ages, which stood about 2 km to the east of Fürstenfeld Abbey in Fürstenfeldbruck, Bavaria, Germany. It was abandoned in the 15th century and its walls were plundered for building materials. Today, only the foundations are visible.

== History ==
The first mention of the name “Kekinpuint” appeared as the name of a settlement on a deed dating from the year 857 CE and means “fenced-in field near a spring”. It is not known what happened to this settlement.

Between 1147 and 1340, the lords of Gegenpoint held court in this castle, but not much is known about them. The Gegenpoints appear to have been ministeriales (German unfree nobles) serving Duke Henry the Lion, and the size of the castle points to a higher status bestowed upon this family by the House of Welf, to which Duke Henry belonged. They gave the nearby city of Fürstenfeldbruk its name and by the 13th century, they owned a large portion of land in the region. The location of their home on the border between the territory of the House of Welf and those of the rapidly growing Wittelsbach family proved to be the castle’s demise however.

After the downfall of the Welf dynasty came the economic ruin of the once-powerful Gegenpoints. This was accentuated by the extreme division of the family’s estate by the childless Heinrich von Gegenpoint. In 1340, his son-in-law sold a large portion of the castle to the nearby Fürstenfeld Abbey, which belonged to the Wittelsbach family. Despite this, the Abbey declined to provide any protection for the castle and eventually allowed it to be torn down.

By the end of the 14th century, the Gegenpoint family had completely disappeared from history.

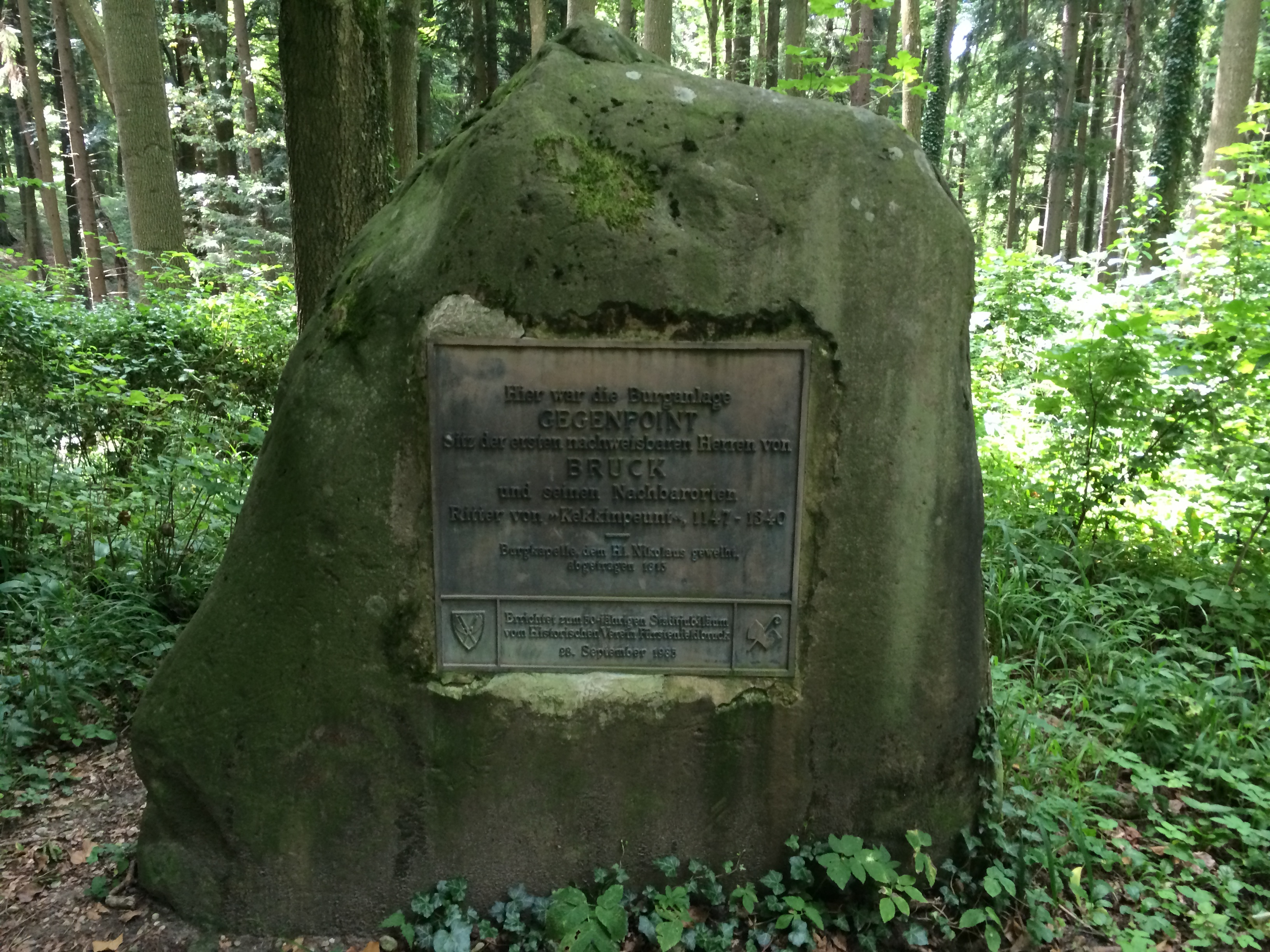
Memorial stone at the east entrance.

In 1985, the Historical Society of Fürstenfeldbruck erected a memorial stone and information plaque on the site of the former east entrance.

== Former Castle Grounds ==
According to a deed dated 1306, a tower along with living quarters stood in the ward and a drawbridge lead to the outer ward. The same document mentions another living apartment, a barn, a well, the castle’s chapel, two gardens and the East Gate with its own drawbridge. The castle’s chapel “St. Nikolaus” outlived the castle, and it was still being used to hold Mass as late as 1775. In 1785, it was finally demolished due to its dilapidated condition. Today, a large wooden cross marks its position. The Bavarian State Office for the Preservation of Historical Objects records the ruin as a mittelalterlichen Burgstall (mediaeval castle ruin) with the monument number D 1-7833-0066.

== Legends ==
According to legend, crying children can be heard by pressing an ear to the ground. These are said to be the children of noblewomen who were killed by the mothers.

The 19th century citizens of nearby Emmering claimed to have found a network of tunnels originating in the woods surrounding the castle.

== Sources ==
- Clemens Böhne: Die Geschichte der Gegenpoints. In: Amperland, Jahrgang 3, 1967, S. 17, 41-42.
- Ulrich Bigalski: Vom Aufstieg und Niedergang einer bayerischen Adelsfamilie. in: Brucker Blätter 1990 (Jahrbuch des Historischen Vereins für die Stadt und den Landkreis Fürstenfeldbruck, Heft 1). Fürstenfeldbruck 1991.
- Volker Liedke, Peter Weinzierl: Landkreis Fürstenfeldbruck (Denkmäler in Bayern, Band I.12). München 1996´, ISBN 3-87490-574-8.
- Hans H. Schmidt (Hrsg.): "Versunkene Burgen" im Fünf-Seen-Land zwischen Ammersee und Isar - Historisch-archäologische Rekonstruktionen (Arbeitskreis für Ortsgeschichtsforschung der Würmregion). Gauting 2002.
- Klaus Köppke: Vermessung des Burgstalls Gegenpoint. In: Otto Meißner und Rolf Marquardt (Hrsg.): Brucker Blätter 2004. Jahrbuch des Historischen Vereins für die Stadt und den Landkreis Fürstenfeldbruck. Heft 15. Fürstenfeldbruck 2004, S. 63-67.
