= Mammendorf station =

Railway station in Germany

Mammendorf
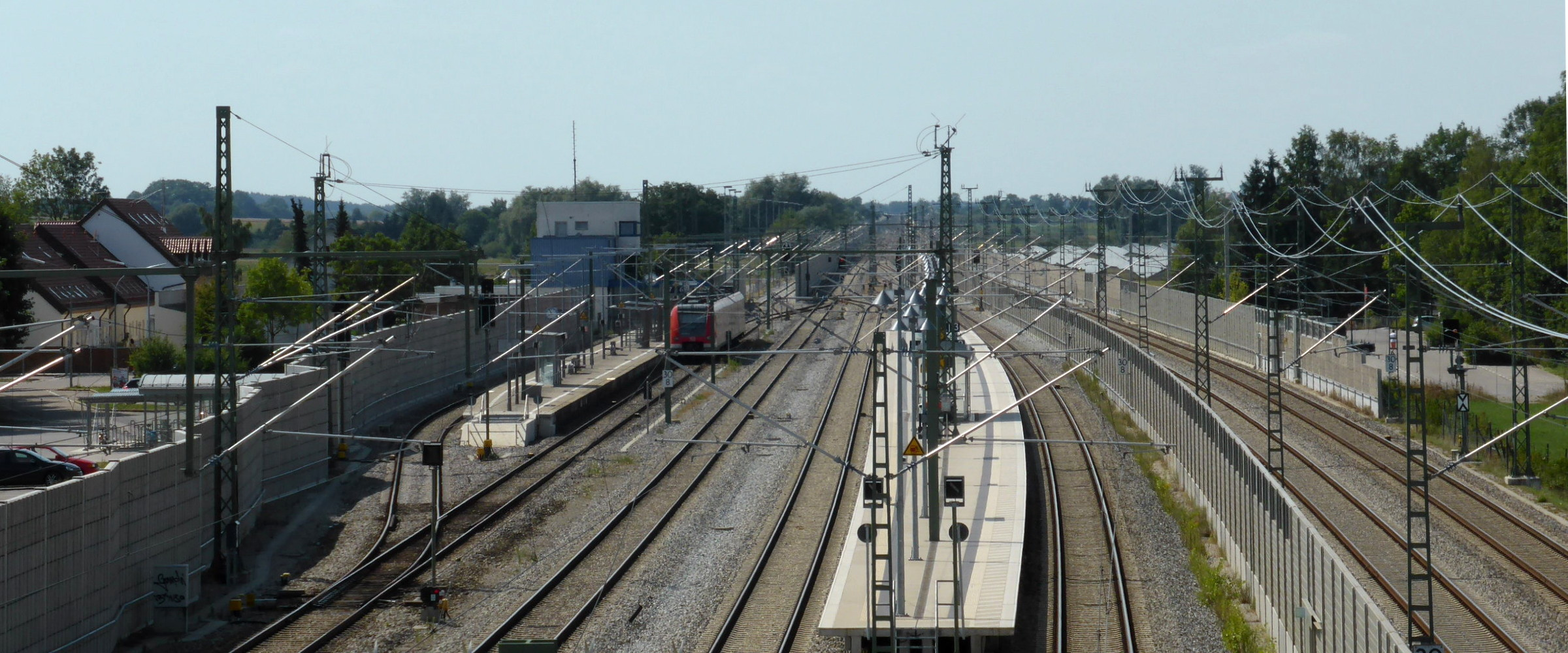

General information
- Location: Am Bahnhof 3; 82291 Mammendorf; Bavaria; Germany
- Coordinates: 48°13′00.0″N 11°10′26.0″E
- Owner: Deutsche Bahn
- Operator: DB Netz; DB Station&Service
- Lines: Munich–Augsburg railway (KBS 980) (KBS 999.3)
- Train operators: Go-Ahead Bayern; S-Bahn München
- Connections: 810, 822, 829, 837, 838, 839, 8800

Other information
- Station code: 4299
- DS100 code: MMAM
- IBNR: 8004204
- Category: 4
- Fare zone: : 3 and 4; : 70 (MVV transitional tariff)
- Website: www.bahnhof.de

History
- Opened: 4 April 1840; 186 years ago

Services
Preceding station		Following station
Haspelmoor towards Ulm Hbf	RE 9 Limited service	Munich-Pasing towards München Hbf
Haspelmoor towards Treuchtlingen	RE 80 Limited service	Munich-Pasing towards München Hbf
Haspelmoor towards Aalen Hbf	RE 89 Limited service	Munich-Pasing towards München Hbf
Haspelmoor towards Dinkelscherben	RB 86	Munich-Pasing towards München Hbf
Haspelmoor towards Donauwörth	RB 87	Munich-Pasing towards München Hbf
Preceding station	Munich S-Bahn	Following station
Terminus	S3	Malching towards Holzkirchen
Location

Mammendorf station is a railway station in the municipality of Mammendorf, located in the district of Fürstenfeldbruck in Upper Bavaria, Germany.
