= Johann Pichler =

German Luftwaffe pilot (1912–1995)

- Born: 15 December 1912; Oberschweinbach
- Died: 16 February 1995 (aged 82); Oberschweinbach
- Military career
- Allegiance: Nazi Germany
- Branch: Luftwaffe
- Service years: 1934–1945
- Rank: Leutnant (second lieutenant)
- Unit: JG 77
- Conflicts: World War II: Eastern Front; Defence of the Reich
- Awards: Knight's Cross of the Iron Cross

Johann Pichler (15 December 1912 – 16 February 1995) was a Luftwaffe ace and recipient of the Knight's Cross of the Iron Cross during World War II. The Knight's Cross of the Iron Cross, and its variants were the highest awards in the military and paramilitary forces of Nazi Germany during World War II. Depending on source, Pichler who served in Jagdgeschwader 77 (JG 77—77th Fighter Wing) was credited with between 39 and 75 aerial victories. He died in his hometown Oberschweinbach on 16 February 1995.

== Career ==
Pichler was born on 15 December 1912 in Oberschweinbach in the Kingdom of Bavaria within the German Empire. In November 1934, Pichler joined the military service of the Wehrmacht, initially serving in the Army. In 1938, he was transferred to the Luftwaffe and following flight and fighter pilot training, (Note: Flight training in the Luftwaffe progressed through the levels A1, A2 and B1, B2, referred to as A/B flight training. A training included theoretical and practical training in aerobatics, navigation, long-distance flights and dead-stick landings. The B courses included high-altitude flights, instrument flights, night landings, and training to handle the aircraft in difficult situations.) Pichler was posted to Jagdgeschwader 77 (JG 77—77th Fighter Wing) in August 1940. There, Pichler was assigned to the 7. Staffel (7th squadron) commanded by Oberleutnant Wolf-Dietrich Huy. The Staffel had just been newly formed and initially received twelve captured Curtiss P-36 Hawk fighters. Pichler was one of the pilots chosen on 15 September to pick up the P-36 aircraft at Berlin Tempelhof Airport to shuttle them Döberitz. On this flight, his P-36 suffered engine failure resulting in a forced landing.

== World War II ==
World War II in Europe had begun on Friday, 1 September 1939, when German forces invaded Poland. In support for Operation Marita, the German invasion of Greece, III. Gruppe of JG 77 was moved to Deta in western Romania on 4 April 1941. On 27, Pichler and Huy scored hits on a freighter off Nauplio claimed to be 20,000 GRT, probably the SS Slamat of 11,636 GRT which was later sunk.

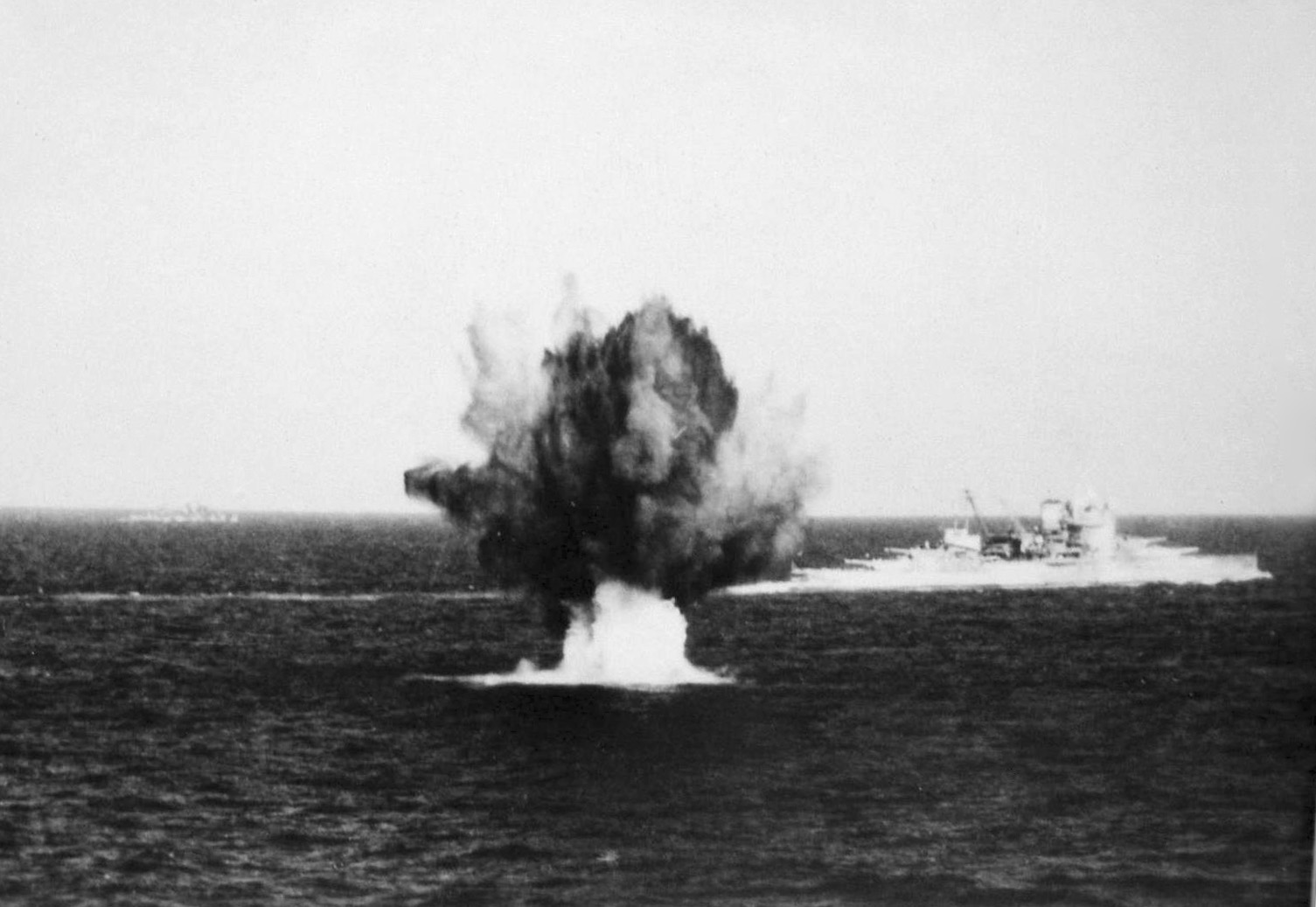
Warspite under attack in the Mediterranean, 1941

In preparation for the Battle of Crete, III. Gruppe was ordered to Molaoi on 11 May. On 16 May, Pichler claimed his first aerial victory, a Hawker Hurricane fighter, during an attack on Maleme Airfield. (Note: Shores, Cull and Malizia date his first aerial victory on 19 April over a Hawker Hurricane fighter.) For his service, Pichler was awarded the Iron Cross 2nd Class (Eisernes Kreuz zweiter Klasse). On 22 May, Huy led 7. Staffel of JG 77 which attacked the British battleship HMS Warspite between 12:13 and 12:48. Oberleutnant Huth, Feldwebel Heinz Furth and Unteroffizier Pichler each had hit the Warspite and damaged her. The pilots had misidentified the ship and had reported an attack on HMS Valiant. Returning from this mission, Pichler crash landed his damaged Messerschmitt Bf 109 E-7 (Werknummer 1963—factory number) at Molaoi and was injured. On 1 June, III. Gruppe was withdrawn from this theater of operations and began transferring to Vienna where they arrived on 4 June. Here, the Gruppe was equipped with the Bf 109 F-4, retaining a few older Bf 109 E aircraft.

=== Eastern Front ===
In preparation for Operation Barbarossa, the German invasion of the Soviet Union, III. Gruppe was moved to Bucharest and was located in the sector of Heeresgruppe Süd (Army Group South). III. Gruppe arrived in Bucharest on 16 June. Four days later, III. Gruppe moved to Roman. That evening, the pilots and ground crews were briefed of the upcoming invasion of the Soviet Union, which opened the Eastern Front. On 2 July in support of the German and Romanian Operation München, III. Gruppe moved to an airfield at Iași. Depending on source, here on either 10 or 11 July, Pichler claimed his first aerial victories on the Eastern Front, two Polikarpov I-16 fighters. (Note: In his 1993 book Prien dates these aerial victories on 11 July while according the 2003 book by Prien, Stemmer, Rodeike and Bock, this took place on 10 July.) On 31 July during the Battle of Uman, German forces had almost completed the encirclement of the 6th and 12th Soviet Armies. That day, III. Gruppe flew eleven combat missions in the area of Haivoron and Pervomaisk. On the second mission, Peichel was credited with two Mikoyan-Gurevich MiG-3 fighters show down, claimed as I-61 fighters, an early Luftwaffe designation for the MiG-3.

On 20 March, III. Gruppe was withdrawn from the Eastern Front and sent to Germany for a period of rest and replenishment. All serviceable aircraft were handed over to II. Gruppe. In mid-April, the Gruppe reunited again at Wien-Aspern Airfield where they received 40 factory new Bf 109 F4/R1 aircraft. On 5 May, the Gruppe began its relocation back to the Eastern Front to participate in Operation Fredericus, the Second Battle of Kharkov.

=== Mediterranean Theater and Romania ===
On 23 October 1942, the British Eighth Army launched the Second Battle of El Alamein. Preceding this attack, the Luftwaffe had already planned to replace Jagdgeschwader 27 (JG 27—27th Fighter Wing), which had been fighting in North African theater, with JG 77. In preparation for this rotation, III. Gruppe of JG 77 was moved to Munich on 19 October where it was equipped with the Messerschmitt Bf 109 G-2/trop. On 23 and 24 October, the Gruppe moved to Bari in southern Italy. The Gruppe then relocated to Tobruk Airfield on 26 October. The following day, the Gruppe moved to an airfield at Tanyet-Harun. On 18 January 1943, Pichler claimed a Boeing B-17 Flying Fortress bomber shot down southwest of Tripoli. The aircraft shot down was probably the B-17F from the United States Army Air Forces (USAAF) 340th Bombardment Squadron of the 97th Bombardment Group which was shot down by fighters near Tripoli. On 18 March, Pichler was awarded the German Cross in Gold (Deutsches Kreuz in Gold).

On 24 June 1943, Pichler claimed a Lockheed P-38 Lightning fighter shot down, his 35th aerial victory in total. His opponent probably belonged to the USAAF 1st or 14th Fighter Group which lost five P-38s with further nine sustaining combat damage. On 14 July, Pichler claimed a Martin B-26 Marauder but was then shot down and wounded during aerial combat with Supermarine Spitfire fighters northwest of Lentini, he bailed out of his Bf 109 G-6 (Werknummer 18151). Returning to his unit on 18 August, his injuries sustained kept him grounded for six months. In November 1943, III. Gruppe had moved to an airfield at Mizil, northeast of Bucharest where they were tasked with fighter protection of the oil fields at Pitești. Here on 4 April 1944, Pichler claimed his first aerial victory following the injuries sustained in July 1943. That day the USAAF Fifteenth Air Force attacked Bucharest. Defending against this attack, Pichler claimed a Consolidated B-24 Liberator bomber.

On 28 July 1944, Pichler was again shot down and severely wounded. Following aerial combat in the area of Pitești, he bailed out of his Bf 109 G-6 (Werknummer 165685) near Titu. Taken to a hospital, Pichler was captured and taken prisoner of war by advancing Soviet forces on 30 August. He was released from Soviet captivity in January 1950. Upon his return to Germany, he was informed that he had been awarded the Knight's Cross of the Iron Cross (Ritterkreuz des Eisernen Kreuzes) on 19 August 1944 and promoted to Leutnant (second lieutenant).

== Later life ==
Pichler, who was released from Soviet imprisonment in January 1950, died on 16 February 1995 at the age of 82 in Oberschweinbach, Germany.

== Summary of career ==
=== Aerial victory claims ===
According to Spick, Pichler was credited with 75 aerial victories claimed in approximately 700 combat missions. This number includes 29 claims on the Eastern Front and 45 claims over the Western Allies, including sixteen heavy bombers. Obermaier lists him with 52 aerial victories, 25 over the Western Allies including 16 heavy bombers, claimed in approximately 700 combat missions. Mathews and Foreman, authors of Luftwaffe Aces — Biographies and Victory Claims, researched the German Federal Archives and found records for 39 aerial victory claims, and one further unconfirmed claim. This figure includes 16 aerial victory over the Western Allies, including ten heavy bombers, and 23 on the Eastern Front.

Victory claims were logged to a map-reference (PQ = Planquadrat), for example "PQ 3787". The Luftwaffe grid map (Jägermeldenetz) covered all of Europe, western Russia and North Africa and was composed of rectangles measuring 15 minutes of latitude by 30 minutes of longitude, an area of about 360 square miles (930 km^{2}). These sectors were then subdivided into 36 smaller units to give a location area 3 km × 4 km (1.9 mi × 2.5 mi) in size.

Chronicle of aerial victories
This along with the * (asterisk) indicates an Herausschuss (separation shot)—a severely damaged heavy bomber forced to separate from his combat box which was counted as an aerial victory. This and the ? (question mark) indicates information discrepancies listed by Prien, Stemmer, Rodeike, Balke, Bock, Mathews and Foreman.
Claim	Date	Time	Type	Location	Claim	Date	Time	Type	Location
– 7. Staffel of Jagdgeschwader 77 – Balkans and Crete — 1 April – 1 June 1941
1	16 May 1941	16:48	Hurricane	7 km (4.3 mi) west of Lakki					
– 7. Staffel of Jagdgeschwader 77 – Operation Barbarossa — 22 June – 5 December 1941
2	10 July 1941? (Note: According to the 1994 book by Prien, on 11 July 1941.)	17:40	I-16		10	5 September 1941	13:55	I-61 (MiG-3)	
3	10 July 1941?	17:48	I-16		11	7 September 1941	09:36	I-61 (MiG-3)	
4	31 July 1941	11:34	I-61 (MiG-3)		12	24 September 1941	17:14	MiG-3	PQ 3787
5? (Note: According to Mathews and Foreman this claim is unconfirmed.)	31 July 1941	—	I-61 (MiG-3)		13	26 September 1941	12:52	Pe-2	
6	14 August 1941	17:42	DB-3		14	19 October 1941	16:11	I-15	
7	15 August 1941	17:45	PS-84		15	23 October 1941	16:21	I-15	
8	5 September 1941	07:38	I-61 (MiG-3)		16	6 November 1941	10:50	I-16	
9	5 September 1941	07:45	I-61 (MiG-3)						
– 7. Staffel of Jagdgeschwader 77 – Eastern Front — 6 December 1941 – 20 March 1942
17	15 January 1942	08:45	DB-3		19	15 January 1942	13:28	SB-2	
18	15 January 1942	13:20	I-301 (LaGG-3)		20? (Note: This claim is not listed by Mathews and Foreman.)	15 January 1942	—	unknown	
According to Prien, Stemmer, Rodeike and Bock, the exact number of aerial victories Pichler had claimed by 20 March 1942 on the Eastern Front cannot be verified. The figure could be 23 aerial victories, potentially up to 25 claims.
	16 March 1942	11:02	DB-3			19 March 1942	13:12	I-153	
	16 March 1942	17:22	I-153	PQ 5684					
– 7. Staffel of Jagdgeschwader 77 – Eastern Front — 1 May – 16 October 1942
According to Prien, Stemmer, Rodeike and Bock, Pichler claimed three additional victories, two which in February/March 1942.
	17 May 1942	08:35	I-153			12 June 1942	06:57	I-153	
– 7. Staffel of Jagdgeschwader 77 – Mediterranean Theater, North Africa — 1 January – May 1943
29	14 January 1943	11:10	P-40	PQ 13 Ost 52512, northwest of Bir el Gheddahia	32	4 April 1943	17:07	B-25	PQ 03 Ost 96831, northwest of Sidi Bouzid
30	14 January 1943	11:26	P-40	PQ 13 Ost 42153, west of Bir Dufan	33	5 April 1943	14:30	B-25	PQ 03 Ost 96683, south of Fondouk
31	18 January 1943	14:24	B-17	PQ 13 Ost 53724, south of Misrata					
– 7. Staffel of Jagdgeschwader 77 – Mediterranean Theater, Italy — June – 14 July 1943
34	18 June 1943	10:12	P-38	PQ 04 Ost 9196, northeast of the Sardinian coast	? (Note: This claim is not listed Mathews and Foreman, nor in the 2011 book by Prien, Stemmer, Rodeike and Bock.)	13 July 1943	—	P-38	
35	24 June 1943	09:56	P-38	PQ 04 Ost 81651, east of Montresta	?	14 July 1943	—	B-26	
– 7. Staffel of Jagdgeschwader 77 – Romania and Hungary — 1 January – 28 July 1944
36	4 April 1944	13:52	B-24*	PQ 24 6573; 25 km (16 mi) northeast of Giurgiu	41	28 June 1944	09:54	B-24*	PQ 24 Ost 5548; Romania
37	15 April 1944	12:55	B-17	PQ 24 Ost 55522; 10 km (6.2 mi) south of Târgșoru Nou	42	3 July 1944	11:50	B-24	PQ 24 Ost 5555; 40 km (25 mi) southeast of Caracal
38	5 May 1944	13:55	B-24*	PQ 24 Ost 55263; 25 km (16 mi) south of Câmpulung	43	3 July 1944	12:15	B-24	PQ 24 Ost 44254; 20 km (12 mi) northwest of Svistov
39	5 May 1944	14:17	B-24	PQ 24 Ost 56773; 55 km (34 mi) east-northeast of Caracal	44	3 July 1944	12:15	B-24	PQ 24 Ost 44353; 60 km (37 mi) west-southwest of Otopeni
40	18 May 1944	11:32	B-17	PQ 24 55719; 20 km (12 mi) west of Băneasa	? (Note: This claim is not listed Mathews and Foreman, nor in the 2021 book by Prien, Stemmer, Bock and Balke.)	22 July 1944	—	B-24	
?	31 May 1944	—	B-24		?	28 July 1944	—	B-24	
?	10 June 1944	—	P-38						

=== Awards and decorations ===
- Iron Cross (1939) 2nd and 1st Class
- Honor Goblet of the Luftwaffe on 25 June 1943 as Oberfeldwebel and pilot
- German Cross in Gold on 18 March 1943 as Oberfeldwebel in the 7./Jagdgeschwader 77
- Knight's Cross of the Iron Cross on 19 August 1944 as Fahnenjunker-Oberfeldwebel and pilot in the 7./Jagdgeschwader 77 (Note: According to Scherzer as Oberfeldwebel who received the Knight's Cross of the Iron Cross as pilot in the III./Jagdgeschwader 77.)
