= Swing Flugsportgeräte =

German aircraft manufacturer

Swing Flugsportgeräte GmbH
- Company type: Gesellschaft mit beschränkter Haftung
- Industry: Aerospace
- Founded: 1986
- Headquarters: Landsberied, Germany
- Products: Paragliders, paramotor wings
- Website: www.swing.de

Swing Flugsportgeräte GmbH (English: Swing Air Sports Equipment Limited) is a German aircraft manufacturer based in Landsberied, 30 km (19 mi) west of Munich, near the Bavarian Alps.

The company specializes in the design and manufacture of paragliders and paramotor wings in the form of ready-to-fly aircraft, as well as paragliding harnesses, reserve parachutes and accessories.

The company is organized as a Gesellschaft mit beschränkter Haftung (GmbH), a German limited liability company.

Founded in 1986, Swing is one of the oldest paraglider manufacturers and has a network of 170 distributors in 48 countries. The company's Arcus beginner level paraglider is one of the best-selling designs in the history of paragliding, with more than 8,500 sold.

== Aircraft ==
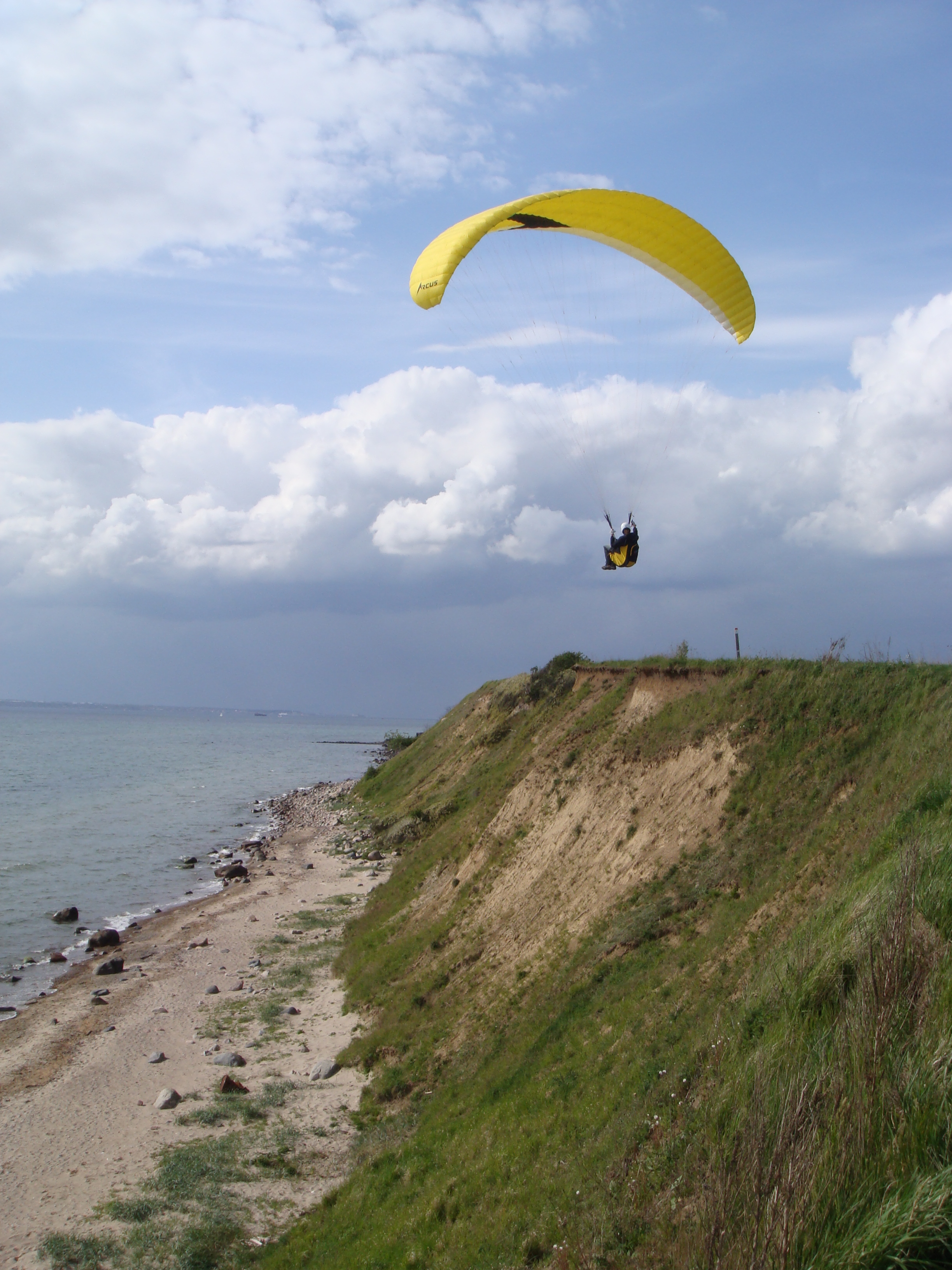
Swing Arcus, with over 8,500 sold, is one of the best-selling paragliders ever

Summary of aircraft built by Swing:

- Swing Apus
- Swing Arcus
- Swing Astral
- Swing Axis
- Swing Brave
- Swing Cirrus
- Swing Connect
- Swing Core
- Swing Discus
- Swing Hybrid
- Swing Mirage
- Swing Mistral
- Swing Mito
- Swing Naja
- Swing Nexus
- Swing Nyos
- Swing Scorpio
- Swing Sensis
- Swing Spitfire
- Swing Sting
- Swing Stratus
- Swing Trinity
- Swing Tusker
- Swing Twin
