= Innozenz Stangl =

German gymnast (1911–1991)

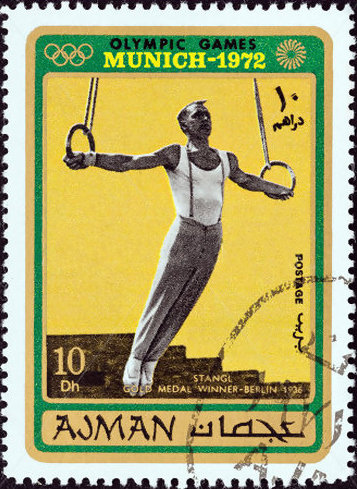
- Stangl on a 1971 stamp of United Arab Emirates

Personal information
- Born: 11 March 1911 Jesenwang, German Empire
- Died: 23 March 1991 (aged 80) Jesenwang, Germany

Gymnastics career
- Discipline: Men's artistic gymnastics
- Country represented: Germany
- Club: Turn- und Sportverein München von 1860
Medal record
Men's artistic gymnastics
Representing Germany
Olympic Games
Gold medal – first place	1936 Berlin	Team

Innozenz Stangl (11 March 1911 – 23 March 1991) was a German gymnast who won a team gold medal at the 1936 Summer Olympics. His best personal result was fourth place on the horizontal bar.
