= Hattenhofen =

Hattenhofen may refer to the following places in Germany:

- Hattenhofen, Baden-Württemberg, in the district of Göppingen
- Hattenhofen, Bavaria, in the district of Fürstenfeldbruck
