= Malching (Oberbay) station =

Railway station in Germany

Malching (Oberbay)
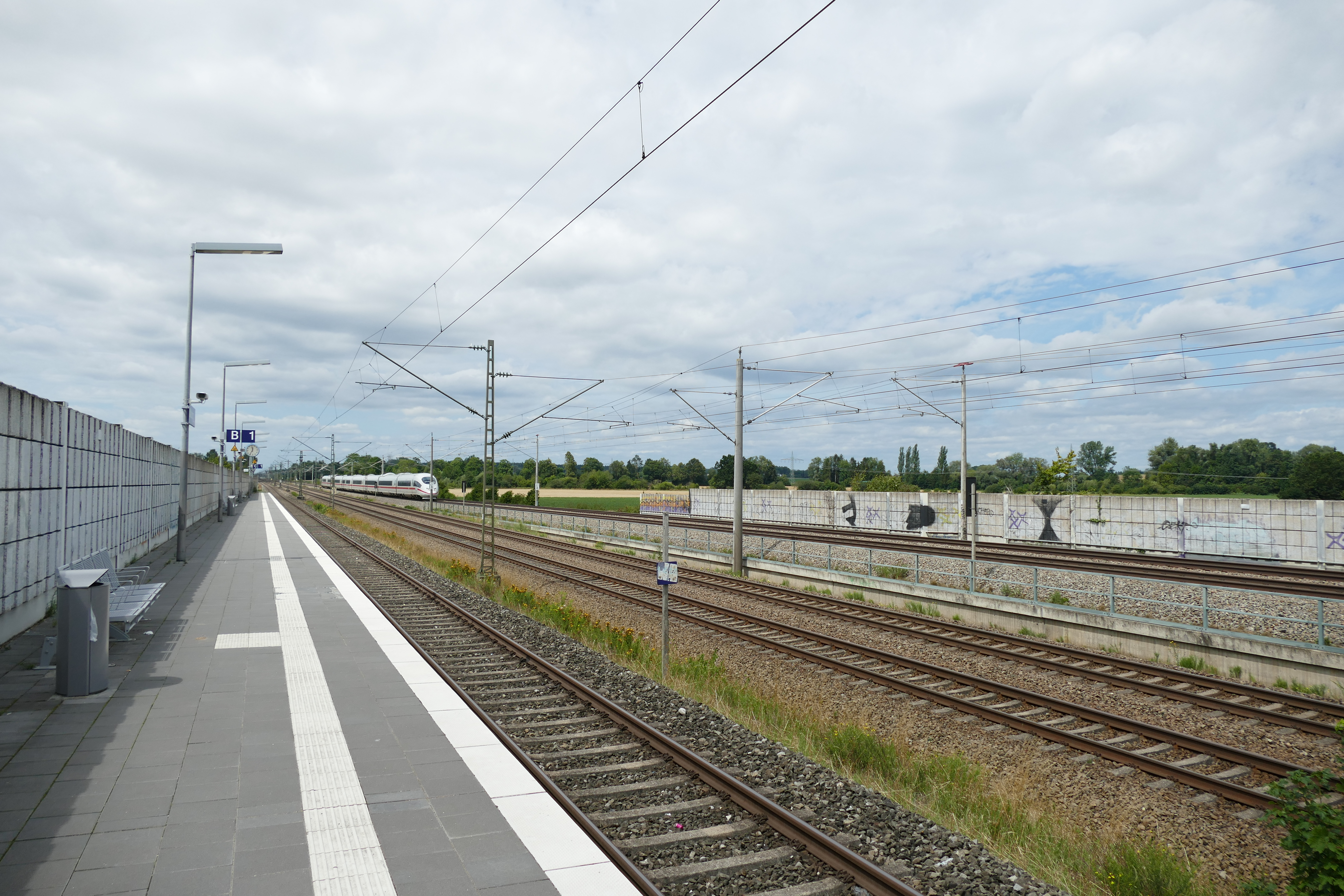

General information
- Location: Am Bahnhof; 82216 Maisach; Bavaria; Germany
- Coordinates: 48.2154°N 11.2183°E
- Owner: DB Netz
- Operator: DB Station&Service
- Lines: Munich–Augsburg railway (KBS 999.3)
- Train operators: S-Bahn München
- Connections: 874, 8700

Other information
- Station code: 3911
- DS100 code: MMAG
- IBNR: 8003828
- Category: 6
- Fare zone: : 2 and 3
- Website: www.bahnhof.de

Services
Preceding station	Munich S-Bahn	Following station
Mammendorf Terminus	S3	Maisach towards Holzkirchen
Location
- Location within Bavaria Location within Germany Location within Europe

Malching (Oberbay) station is a railway station in the Malching district of the municipality of Maisach, located in the district of Fürstenfeldbruck in Upper Bavaria, Germany.
