= Eichenau =

- Municipality
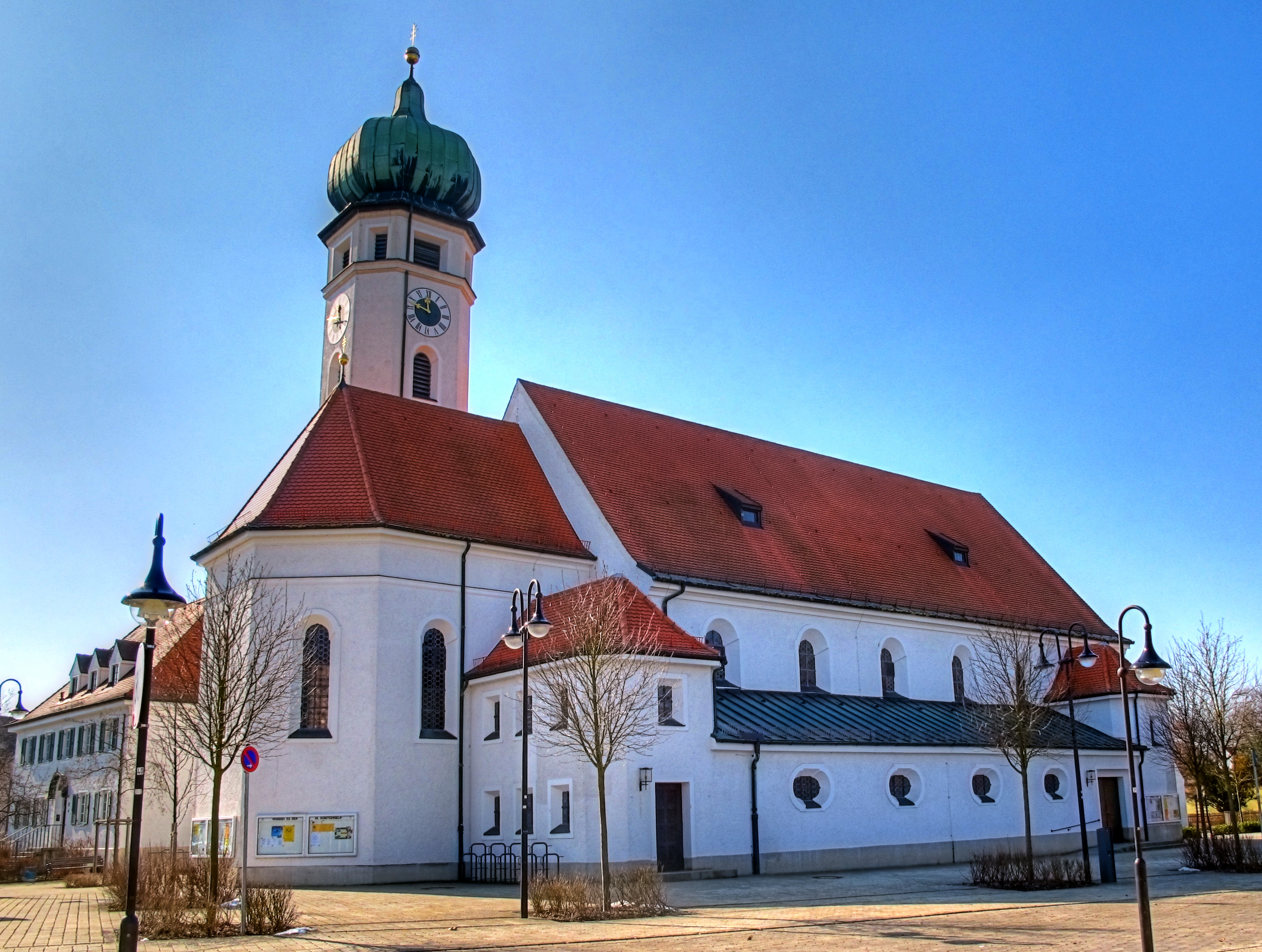
- Parish Church of the Holy Archers

- Coat of arms

- Location of Eichenau within Fürstenfeldbruck district
- Interactive map of Eichenau
- Location within Germany Location within Bavaria
- Coordinates: 48°10′N 11°19′E
- Country: Germany
- State: Bavaria
- Admin. region: Oberbayern
- District: Fürstenfeldbruck

Government
  - Mayor (2022–28): Peter Münster (Ind.)

Area
  - Total: 6.99 km^{2} (2.70 sq mi)
- Elevation: 522 m (1,713 ft)

Population (2025-12-31)
  - Total: 11,483
  - Density: 1,640/km^{2} (4,250/sq mi)
- Time zone: UTC+01:00 (CET)
  - Summer (DST): UTC+02:00 (CEST)
- Postal codes: 82223
- Dialling codes: 08141
- Vehicle registration: FFB
- Website: www.eichenau.de

Eichenau (German pronunciation: [ˈaɪçənaʊ]) is a municipality in the district of Fürstenfeldbruck, in Bavaria, Germany. It is 20 km west of Munich (centre).

Eichenau was officially named in 1907 as a separate settlement to the community of Alling. Its location is due to the railway station on the line Munich to Lindau. The settlement grew according to plans made by district commissioner Josef Nibler in Fürstenfeldbruck since 1916. He founded the Baugenossenschaft Eichenau and managed to acquire 60 ha of land for housing projects after the First World War. Most of the population commutes to Munich. The town now has a large sports centre, complete with outdoor beach volleyball courts and tennis courts.

Eichenau has two elementary schools ("Grundschule") and one high school ("Mittelschule").

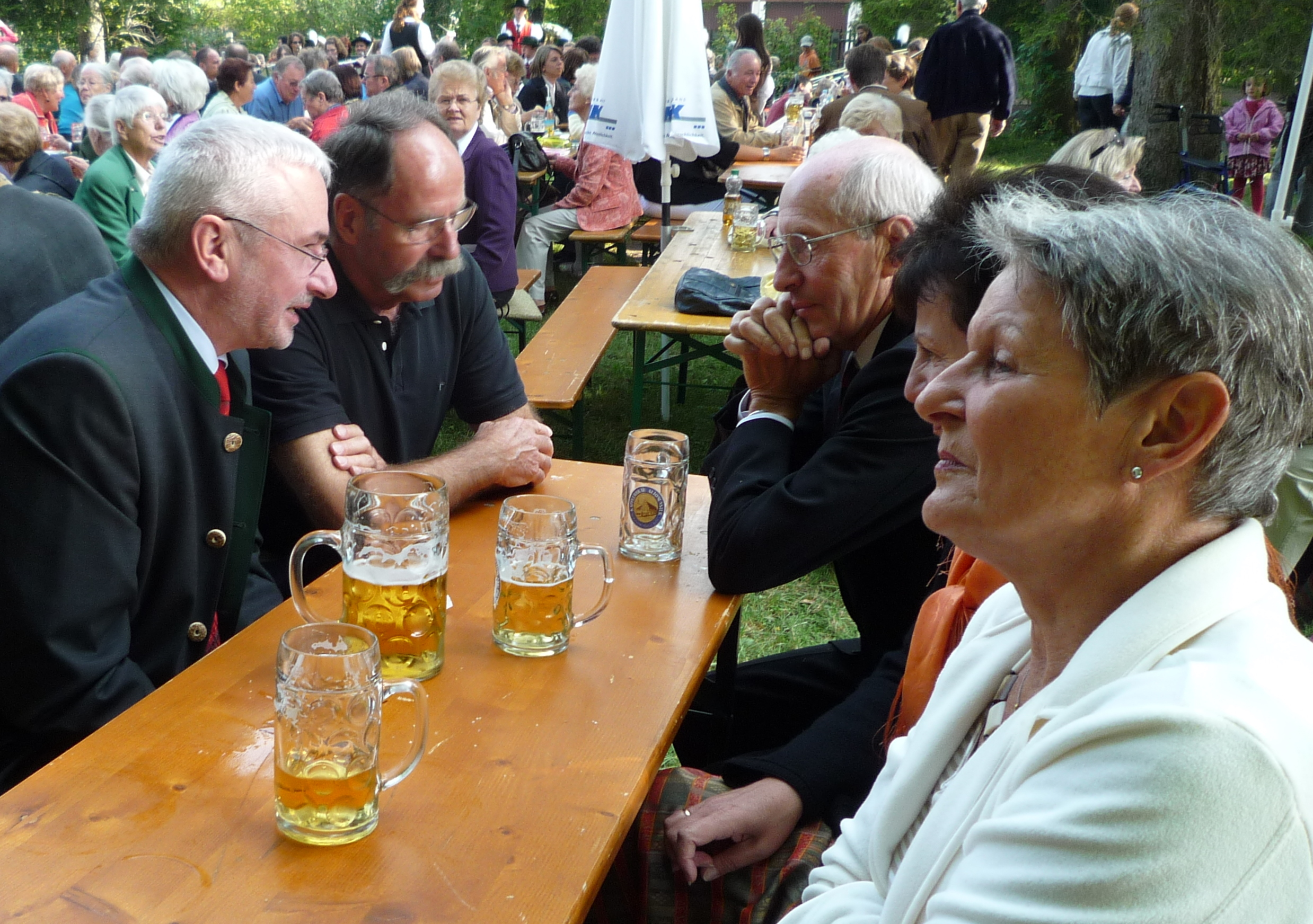
Friedenskirche Eichenau summer 2008, Mayor Hubert Jung (left) and deputy Gabi Riehl (right)

== Twin towns ==
- Budrio, Italy, since 1990.
- Vyshhorod, Ukraine, since 1994.

== Satellite Images ==
http://www.wikimapia.org/#lat=48.&lon=11.&z=14&l=5&m=a&v=2

== Famous people ==
- Claus Biederstaedt (1928-2020), German actor
- George Bouzianis (1885–1959), Greek painter
- Helmut Gneuss, (1927-2023), German anglicist
- Widukind Lenz (1919–1995), German scientist
- Georg Spillner (1908–1998), clown Nuk

== Literature ==
- Hejo Busley, Angelika Schuster-Fox, Michael Gumtau (Hrsg.): Geschichte im Schatten einer Großstadt. Eichenau 1907–2007. Herbert Utz Verlag, München 2007, ISBN 3-8316-0717-6 (ISBN ) bzw. ISBN 978-3-8316-0717-4 (ISBN )
- Landratsamt Fürstenfeldbruck: Der Landkreis Fürstenfeldbruck – Natur, Geschichte, Kultur, Fürstenfeldbruck 1992
