= Grafrath (Verwaltungsgemeinschaft) =

- Verwaltungsgemeinschaft
- Location of Grafrath within Fürstenfeldbruck district
- Interactive map of Grafrath
- Location within Germany Location within Bavaria
- Coordinates: 48°07′N 11°10′E
- Country: Germany
- State: Bavaria
- Admin. region: Upper Bavaria
- District: Fürstenfeldbruck
- Seat: Grafrath
- Subdivisions: 3 municipalities

Area
  - Total: 35.5 km^{2} (13.7 sq mi)

Population (2025-12-31)
  - Total: 7,345
  - Density: 207/km^{2} (536/sq mi)
- Time zone: UTC+01:00 (CET)
  - Summer (DST): UTC+02:00 (CEST)
- Website: www.vg-grafrath.de

Grafrath is a Verwaltungsgemeinschaft (municipal association) in the district of Fürstenfeldbruck in Bavaria, Germany. Its seat is in Grafrath.

It consists of the following municipalities:

1. Grafrath
2. Kottgeisering
3. Schöngeising
