= Emmering, Fürstenfeldbruck =

Emmering
- Municipality
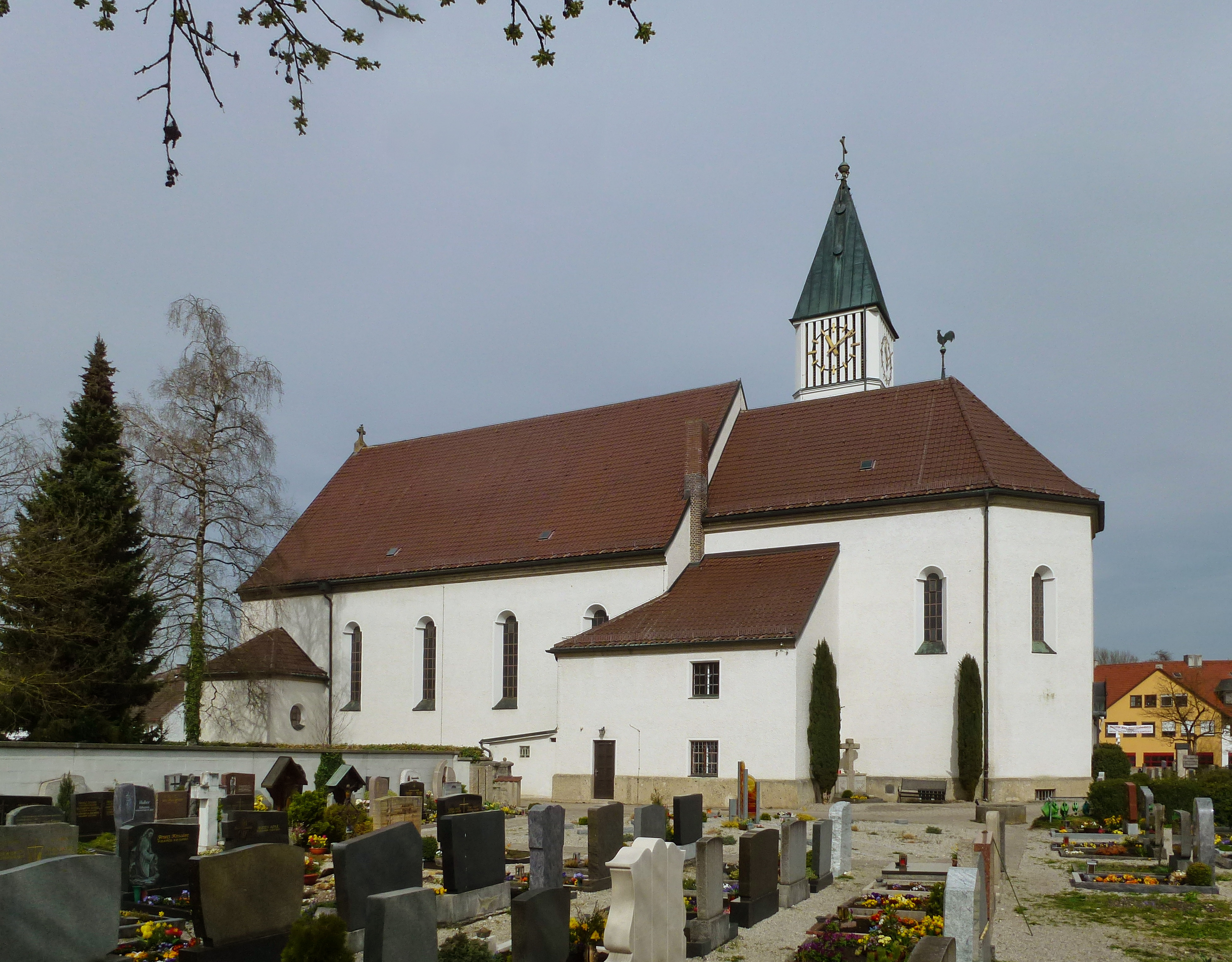
- Church of Saint John the Baptist

- Coat of arms

- Location of Emmering within Fürstenfeldbruck district
- Interactive map of Emmering
- Location within Germany Location within Bavaria
- Coordinates: 48°11′N 11°17′E
- Country: Germany
- State: Bavaria
- Admin. region: Oberbayern
- District: Fürstenfeldbruck
- Subdivisions: 4 Ortsteile

Government
  - Mayor (2020–26): Stefan Floerecke (CSU)

Area
  - Total: 10.95 km^{2} (4.23 sq mi)
- Elevation: 515 m (1,690 ft)

Population (2025-12-31)
  - Total: 6,849
  - Density: 625.5/km^{2} (1,620/sq mi)
- Time zone: UTC+01:00 (CET)
  - Summer (DST): UTC+02:00 (CEST)
- Postal codes: 82275
- Dialling codes: 08141
- Vehicle registration: FFB
- Website: www.emmering.de

Emmering (German pronunciation: [ˈɛməʁɪŋ]) is a municipality in the district of Fürstenfeldbruck in Bavaria in Germany.

== Geography ==
- Emmeringer Leite, mountain 561 m (1,841 ft)
