= Kottgeisering =

- Municipality
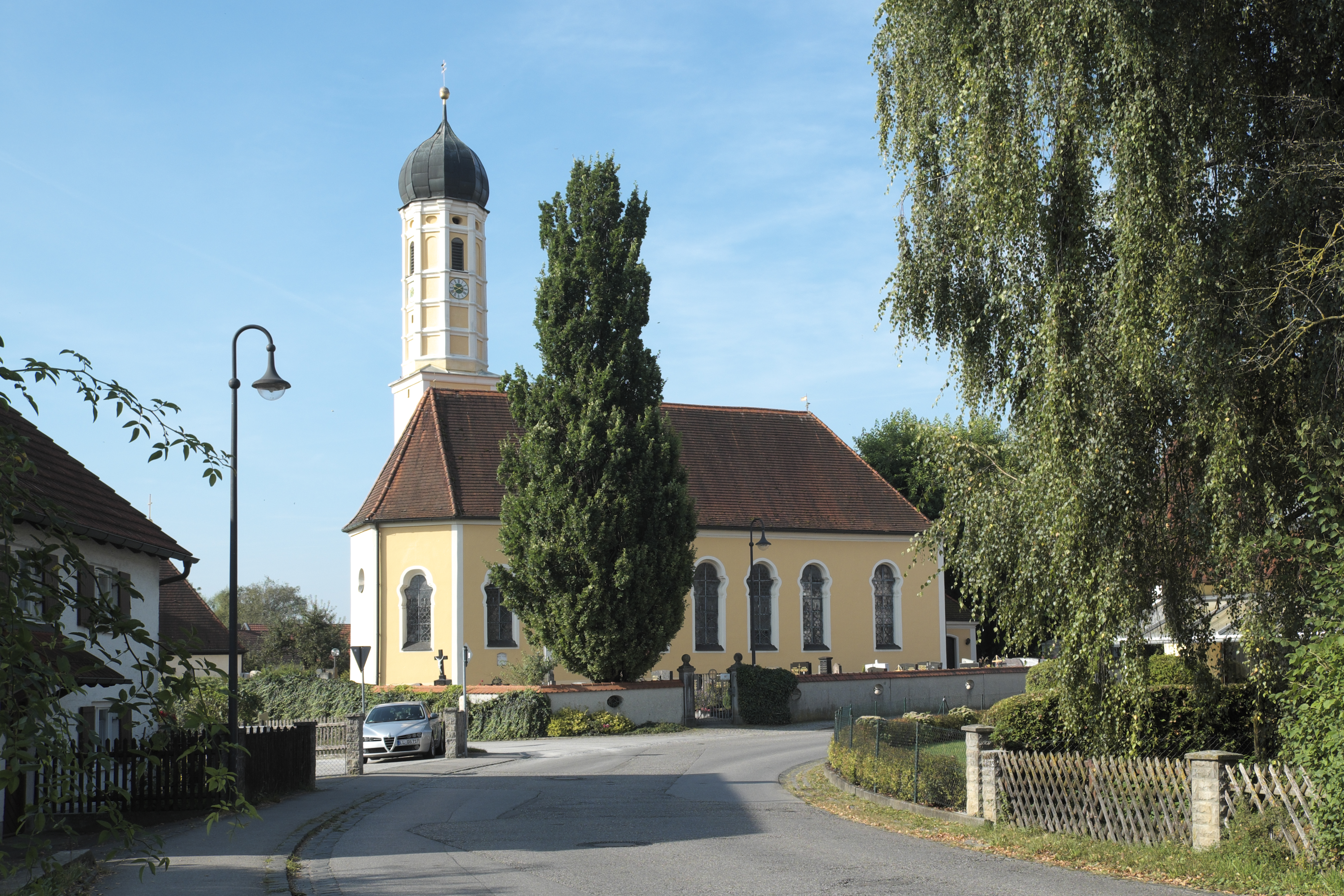
- Church of Saint Valentine

- Coat of arms

- Location of Kottgeisering within Fürstenfeldbruck district
- Interactive map of Kottgeisering
- Location within Germany Location within Bavaria
- Coordinates: 48°07′N 11°08′E
- Country: Germany
- State: Bavaria
- Admin. region: Oberbayern
- District: Fürstenfeldbruck
- Municipal assoc.: Grafrath

Government
  - Mayor (2020–26): Andreas Folger

Area
  - Total: 8.21 km^{2} (3.17 sq mi)
- Elevation: 542 m (1,778 ft)

Population (2025-12-31)
  - Total: 1,574
  - Density: 192/km^{2} (497/sq mi)
- Time zone: UTC+01:00 (CET)
  - Summer (DST): UTC+02:00 (CEST)
- Postal codes: 82288
- Dialling codes: 08144
- Vehicle registration: FFB
- Website: www.kottgeisering.de

Kottgeisering is a municipality in the district of Fürstenfeldbruck in Bavaria, Germany.
