= Mammendorf (Verwaltungsgemeinschaft) =

- Verwaltungsgemeinschaft
- Location of Mammendorf within Fürstenfeldbruck district
- Interactive map of Mammendorf
- Location within Germany Location within Bavaria
- Coordinates: 48°13′N 11°10′E
- Country: Germany
- State: Bavaria
- Admin. region: Upper Bavaria
- District: Fürstenfeldbruck
- Seat: Mammendorf
- Subdivisions: 8 municipalities

Area
  - Total: 109.46 km^{2} (42.26 sq mi)

Population (2025-12-31)
  - Total: 17,320
  - Density: 158.2/km^{2} (409.8/sq mi)
- Time zone: UTC+01:00 (CET)
  - Summer (DST): UTC+02:00 (CEST)
- Website: www.vgmammendorf.de

Mammendorf is a Verwaltungsgemeinschaft (municipal association) in the district of Fürstenfeldbruck in Bavaria, Germany. Its seat is in Mammendorf.

It consists of the following municipalities:

1. Adelshofen
2. Althegnenberg
3. Hattenhofen
4. Jesenwang
5. Landsberied
6. Mammendorf
7. Mittelstetten
8. Oberschweinbach
