= Emmeringer Leite =

Mountain in Germany

Coordinates: 48°10′N 11°18′E

Highest point
- Elevation: 561 m (1,841 ft)

Geography
- Location: Bavaria, Germany

Emmeringer Leite is a mountain of Bavaria in the district of Fürstenfeldbruck, Germany.

== See also ==
- List of mountains of Bavaria
