= Wildmoos (Gilching) =

Nature reserve in Bavaria, Germany

- IUCN category IV (habitat/species management area)
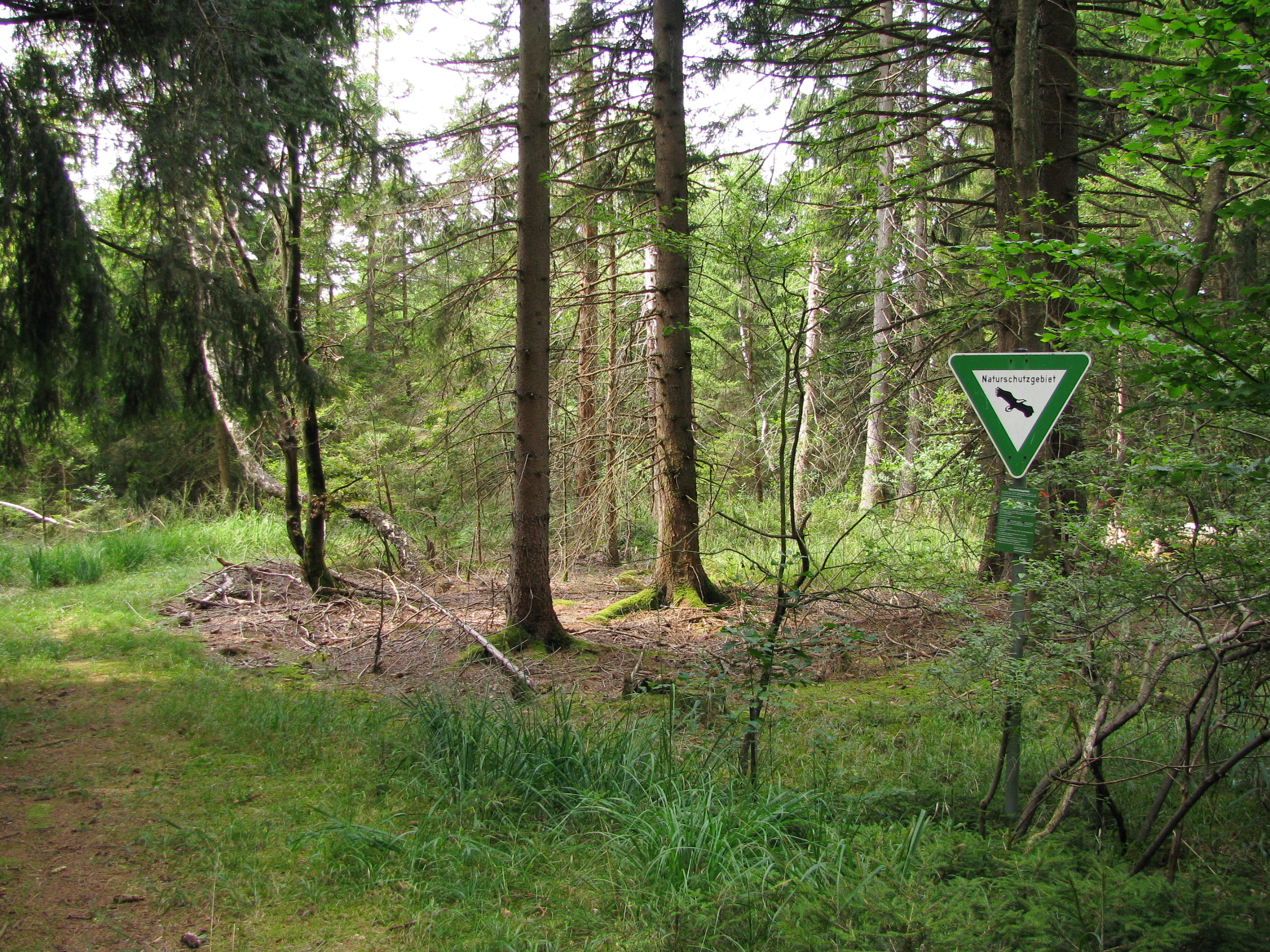
- Interactive map of Wildmoos
- Location: Gilching, Starnberg, Bavaria, Germany
- Area: 4,515 ha (11,160 acres)
- Established: 1979
- Governing body: District of Starnberg

Wildmoos Nature Reserve is a protected area located in the municipality of Gilching in the Starnberg District, Bavaria. It is also part of the Western Part of Starnberg District landscape conservation area and "Moors and Beech Forests between Etterschlag and Fürstenfeldbruck" (Moore und Buchenwälder zwischen Etterschlag und Fürstenfeldbruck) Natura 2000 site.

== History ==
=== Peat extraction ===
Until the 1920s, Wildmoos was a largely untouched fen with a peat thickness of up to four meters. In order to extract the desired peat as a heating material, the area was drained in 1927. However, it was later discovered that the quality of the peat for heating was unsuitable, as the peat bricks shrank significantly and crumbled after drying. Peat extraction was only economically viable in times of necessity and was discontinued around 1960.

The nature reserve was designated by the Starnberg District Office (Landratsamt Starnberg) on August 27, 1979. In 2004, it was recognized as Natura 2000 special area of conservation, a network of protected areas in the European Union.

=== Renaturation ===
To preserve the moor habitat with its typical vegetation and associated wildlife, renaturation with the goal of restoring the moorland began in 2013. The project was delayed due to the fact that the moorland area belonged to 130 landowners. Agreements were eventually reached with most of them, allowing work to begin in February 2022. This involved the removal of spruce trees covering an area of 1.9 hectares, as spruce trees have a high water consumption in a moor. Additionally, 30 dam structures were installed in 19 water-carrying ditches. The main ditch cannot be dammed yet due to missing permissions. The project was supported by the Entrepreneur Association for Economic Development Starnberg (UWS) and the District Farmers' Association. The costs are estimated at €100,000 and are covered 90% by the State of Bavaria.

== Geography and geology ==
Wildmoos is located in the extreme northwest of Starnberg District at an elevation of 571 metres (1,873 ft). To the north and east, it is partially surrounded by steeply rising moraine hills, along with the adjacent Görbelmoos. To the west, it borders the fields of the hamlet of Jexhof (Bauernhofmuseum Jexhof), situated in a depression in the Fürstenfeldbruck District. The Kellerbach stream flows through Wildmoos, running from its source in the northeast to the southwest through the protected area.

Wildmoos was formed as a peat-filled kettle after the retreat of the glaciers of the Würm glaciation. The area of 0.45 km^{2} is embedded in the landscape of the "Pre-Alpine Moor and Hilly Country" of the Jungmoränenland.

== Flora and Fauna ==
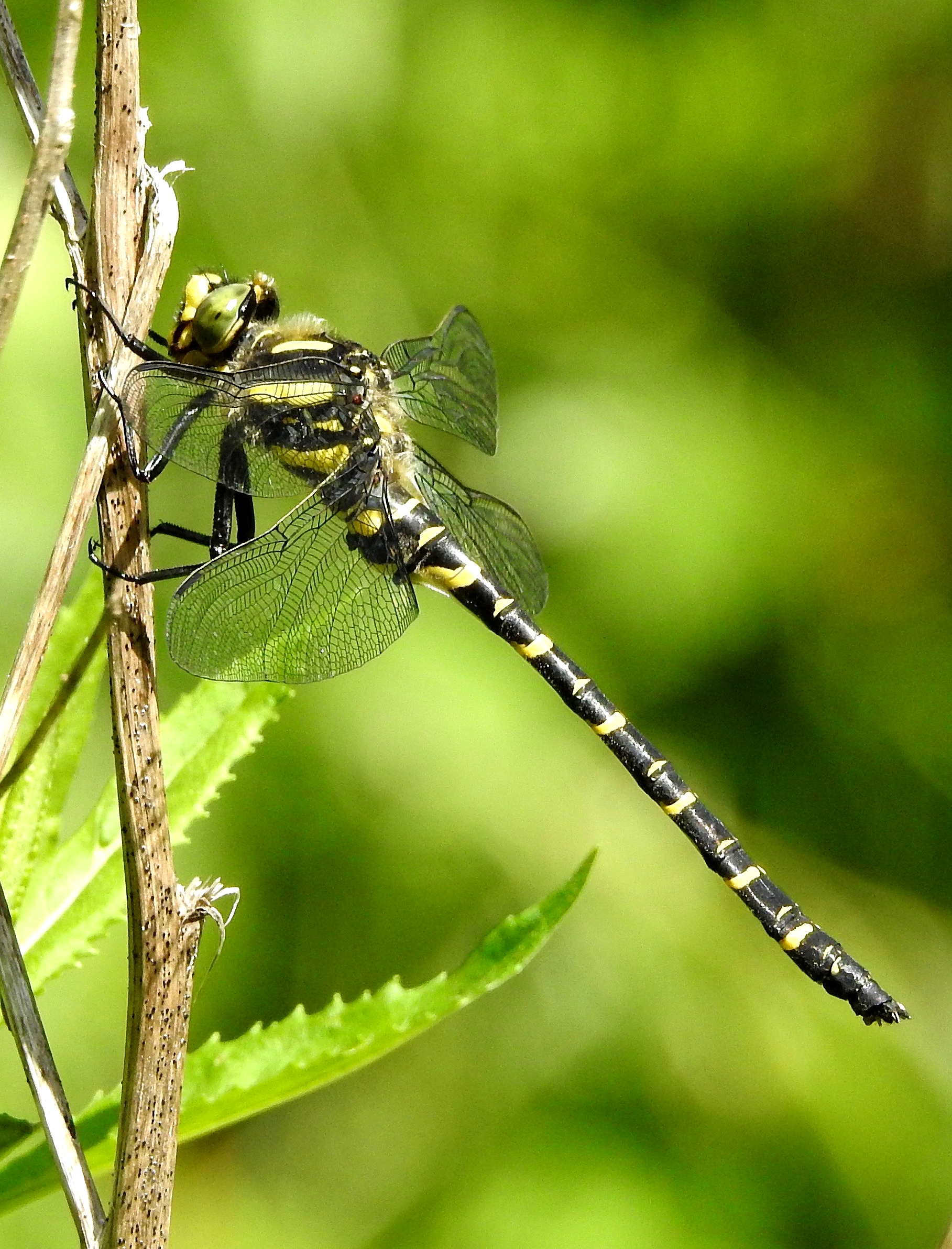
Two-striped Emerald Damselfly in Wildmoos Nature Reserve

The central part of Wildmoos consists of open Scots pine and birch moorland, while the peripheral areas have dense growths of common heather and bog birch in some places. Some specimens of shrubby birch also grow here. The shrubby birch is a very rare and significant glacial relic in Bavaria. In drier moor areas in the former peat extraction sites, there is a lichen-rich heath vegetation, and in wetter areas, the original high moor vegetation with round-leaved sundew, wintergreen, sheathed cottonsedge, and lingonberry can be found. The meadows in the peripheral areas now host rare plants such as the Siberian iris and the marsh gentian. The endangered lady's slipper orchid, which can grow up to 50 cm tall, can still be found here.

The long-standing drainage of Wildmoos posed a significant threat not only to the high moorland vegetation but also to amphibians and insects. Renaturation is of great benefit to species reliant on suitable breeding waters, such as the critically endangered yellow-bellied toad and the common goldenring dragonfly from the hawker dragonfly family.
