= Oberschweinbach =

- Municipality
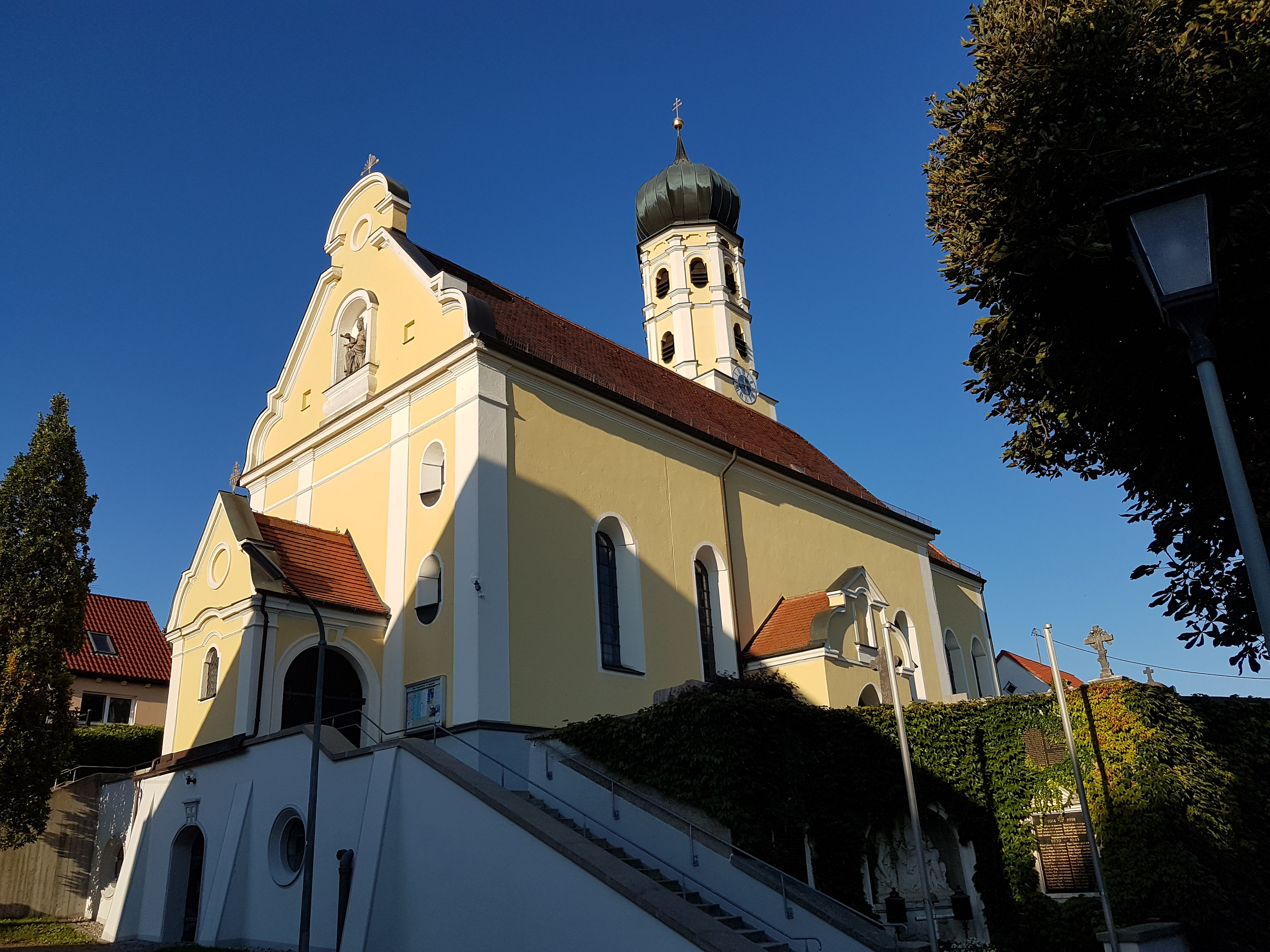
- Church of Saint Margaret in Günzlhofen

- Coat of arms

- Location of Oberschweinbach within Fürstenfeldbruck district
- Interactive map of Oberschweinbach
- Location within Germany Location within Bavaria
- Coordinates: 48°15′N 11°10′E
- Country: Germany
- State: Bavaria
- Admin. region: Oberbayern
- District: Fürstenfeldbruck
- Municipal assoc.: Mammendorf

Government
  - Mayor (2020–26): Norbert Riepl (CSU)

Area
  - Total: 7.23 km^{2} (2.79 sq mi)
- Elevation: 548 m (1,798 ft)

Population (2025-12-31)
  - Total: 1,769
  - Density: 245/km^{2} (634/sq mi)
- Time zone: UTC+01:00 (CET)
  - Summer (DST): UTC+02:00 (CEST)
- Postal codes: 82294
- Dialling codes: 08145
- Vehicle registration: FFB
- Website: www.oberschweinbach.de

Oberschweinbach (Bavarian: Obaschwoambach) is a municipality in the district of Fürstenfeldbruck in Bavaria in Germany.
