= Alling =

- Municipality
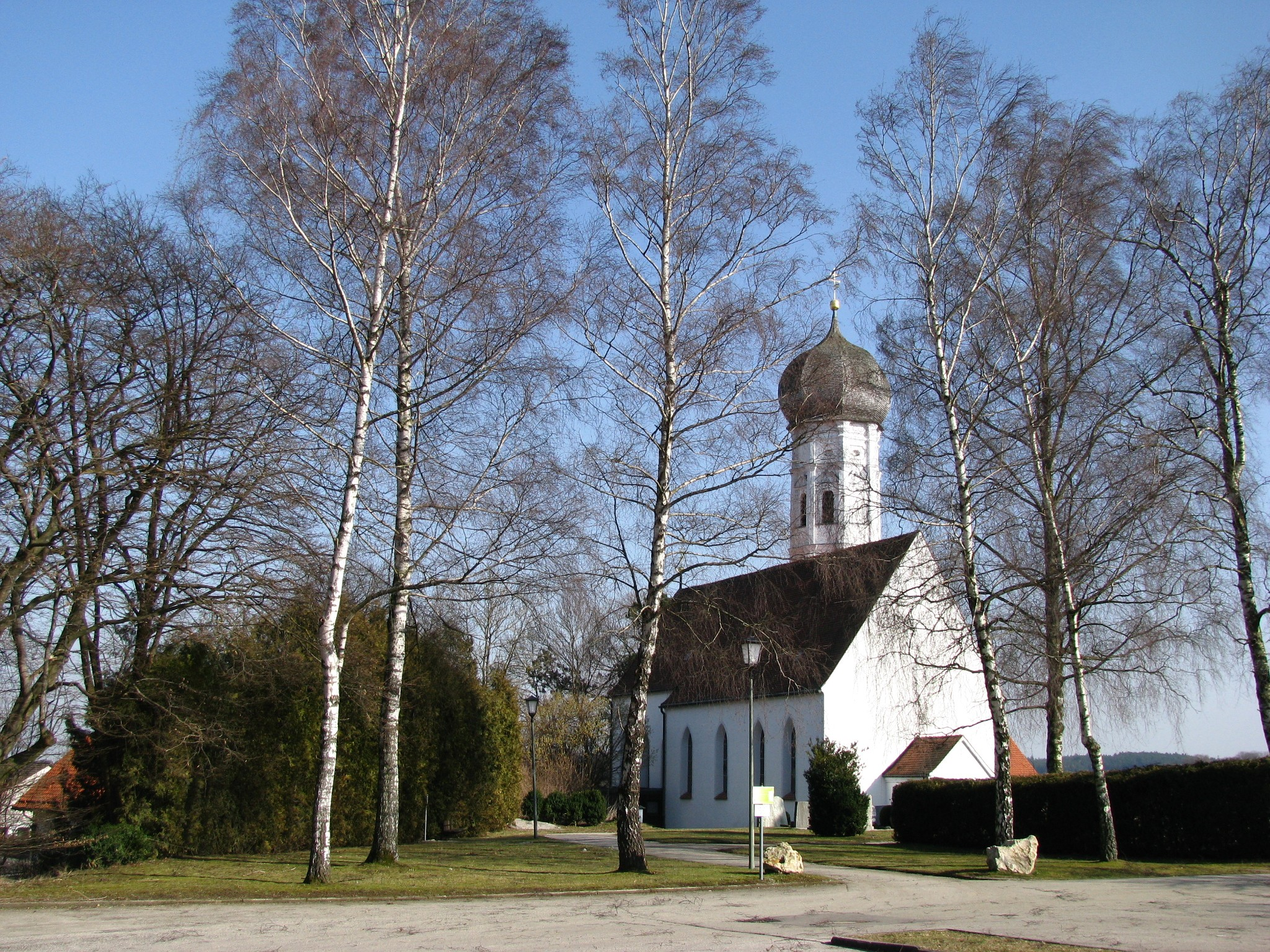
- Church in Alling

- Coat of arms

- Location of Alling within Fürstenfeldbruck district
- Interactive map of Alling
- Location within Germany Location within Bavaria
- Coordinates: 48°9′N 11°18′E
- Country: Germany
- State: Bavaria
- Admin. region: Upper Bavaria
- District: Fürstenfeldbruck

Government
  - Mayor (2020–26): Stefan Joachimsthaler (CSU)

Area
  - Total: 21.02 km^{2} (8.12 sq mi)
- Elevation: 550 m (1,800 ft)

Population (2025-12-31)
  - Total: 4,103
  - Density: 195.2/km^{2} (505.6/sq mi)
- Time zone: UTC+01:00 (CET)
  - Summer (DST): UTC+02:00 (CEST)
- Postal codes: 82239
- Dialling codes: 08141
- Vehicle registration: FFB
- Website: www.alling.de

Alling (German pronunciation: [ˈalɪŋ]) is a municipality in the district of Fürstenfeldbruck, Bavaria, Germany.
