= Mammendorf =

- Municipality
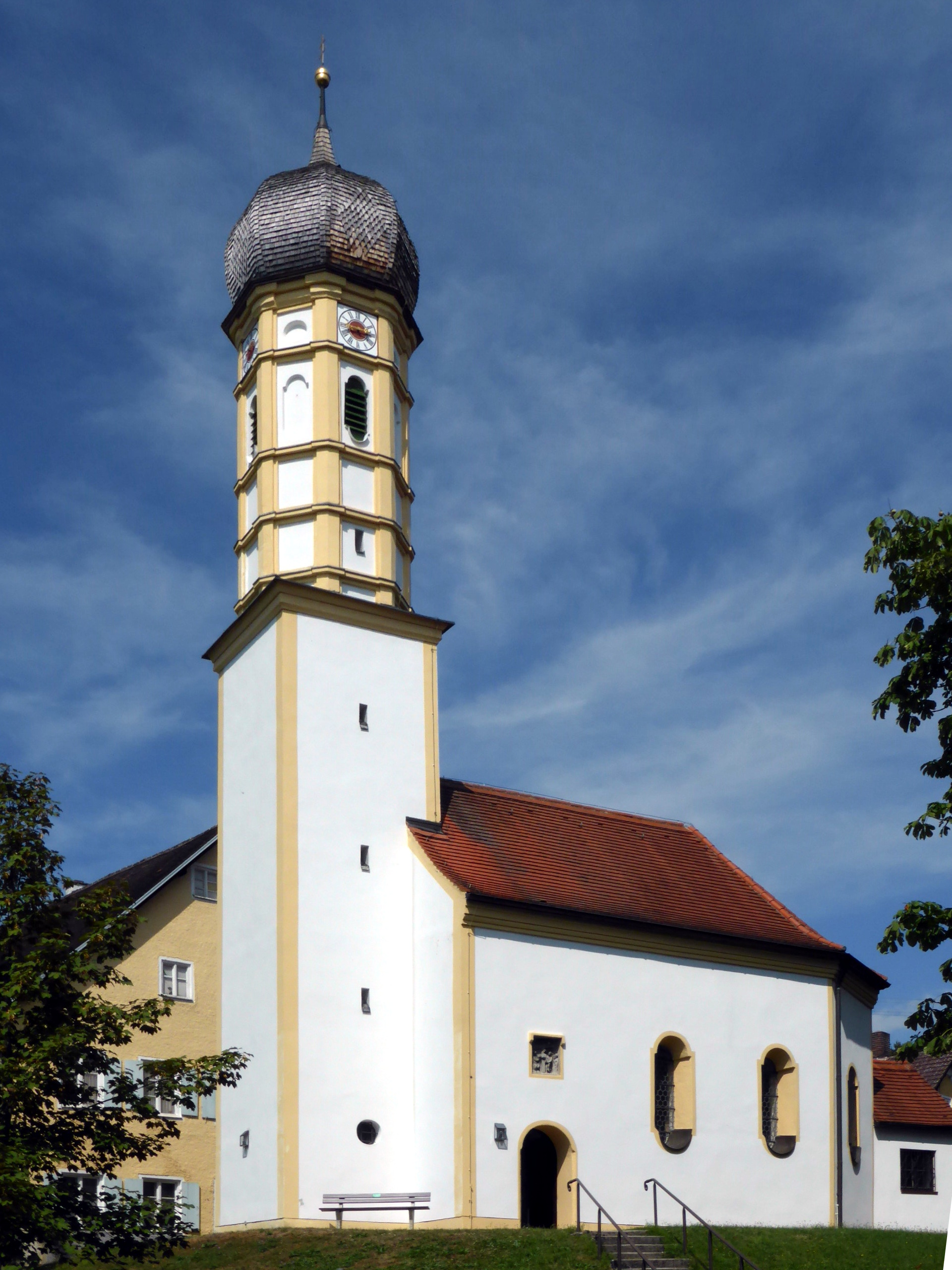
- Church of Saint Peter and Paul in Nannhofen

- Coat of arms

- Location of Mammendorf within Fürstenfeldbruck district
- Interactive map of Mammendorf
- Location within Germany Location within Bavaria
- Coordinates: 48°12′N 11°11′E
- Country: Germany
- State: Bavaria
- Admin. region: Oberbayern
- District: Fürstenfeldbruck
- Municipal assoc.: Mammendorf

Government
  - Mayor (2020–26): Josef Heckl

Area
  - Total: 21.22 km^{2} (8.19 sq mi)
- Elevation: 536 m (1,759 ft)

Population (2025-12-31)
  - Total: 5,068
  - Density: 238.8/km^{2} (618.6/sq mi)
- Time zone: UTC+01:00 (CET)
  - Summer (DST): UTC+02:00 (CEST)
- Postal codes: 82291
- Dialling codes: 08145
- Vehicle registration: FFB
- Website: www.mamendorf.de

Mammendorf (German pronunciation: [ˈmaməndɔʁf]) is a municipality in Bavaria, Germany. It is located halfway between Munich and Augsburg.

== Location ==
Mammendorf is part of the district of Fürstenfeldbruck, Upper Bavaria and lies about 6 kilometres northwest of the city of Fürstenfeldbruck. The towns Nannhofen and Peretshofen are part of the municipality of Mammendorf.

== Geography ==
The Maisach River flows through Mammendorf.

== Transport ==
Mammendorf-Nannhofen is the last station of the Munich S-Bahn line S3, as well as the terminus of the R1 line of Augsburg's transport system, Augsburger Verkehrsverbund (AVV).

== Notable people ==
- Gerhard Merz, artist
