= Jesenwang =

- Municipality
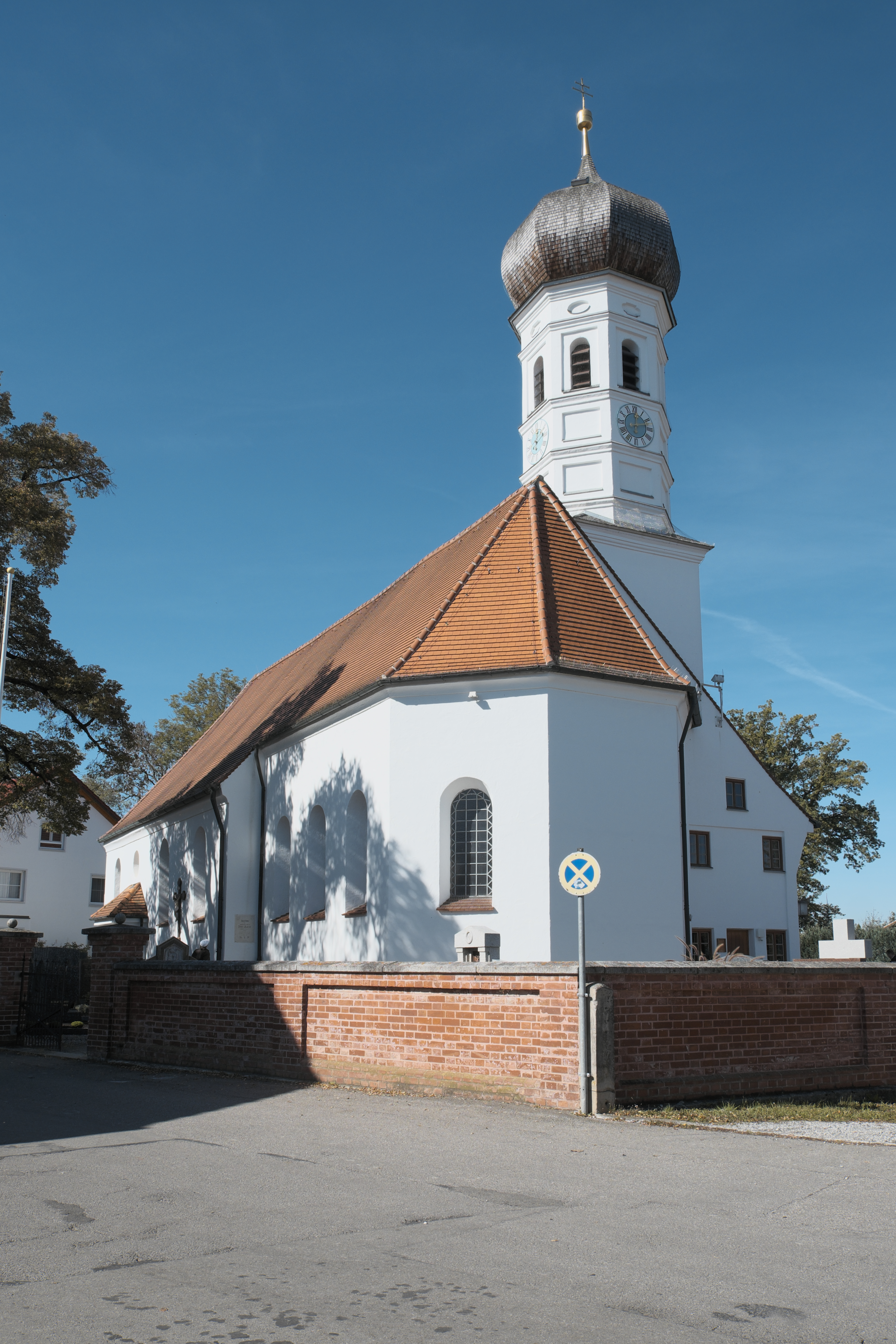
- Church of Saint Michael

- Coat of arms

- Location of Jesenwang within Fürstenfeldbruck district
- Interactive map of Jesenwang
- Location within Germany Location within Bavaria
- Coordinates: 48°10′N 11°8′E
- Country: Germany
- State: Bavaria
- Admin. region: Oberbayern
- District: Fürstenfeldbruck
- Municipal assoc.: Mammendorf

Government
  - Mayor (2020–26): Erwin Fraunhofer (CSU)

Area
  - Total: 15.3 km^{2} (5.9 sq mi)
- Elevation: 558 m (1,831 ft)

Population (2025-12-31)
  - Total: 1,678
  - Density: 110/km^{2} (284/sq mi)
- Time zone: UTC+01:00 (CET)
  - Summer (DST): UTC+02:00 (CEST)
- Postal codes: 82287
- Dialling codes: 08146
- Vehicle registration: FFB
- Website: www.jesenwang.de

Jesenwang (German pronunciation: [ˈjeːzn̩ˌvaŋ]) is a municipality in the district of Fürstenfeldbruck in Bavaria in Germany. Its name was recorded as Oasinwanc during the early medieval period.
