= Althegnenberg =

- Municipality
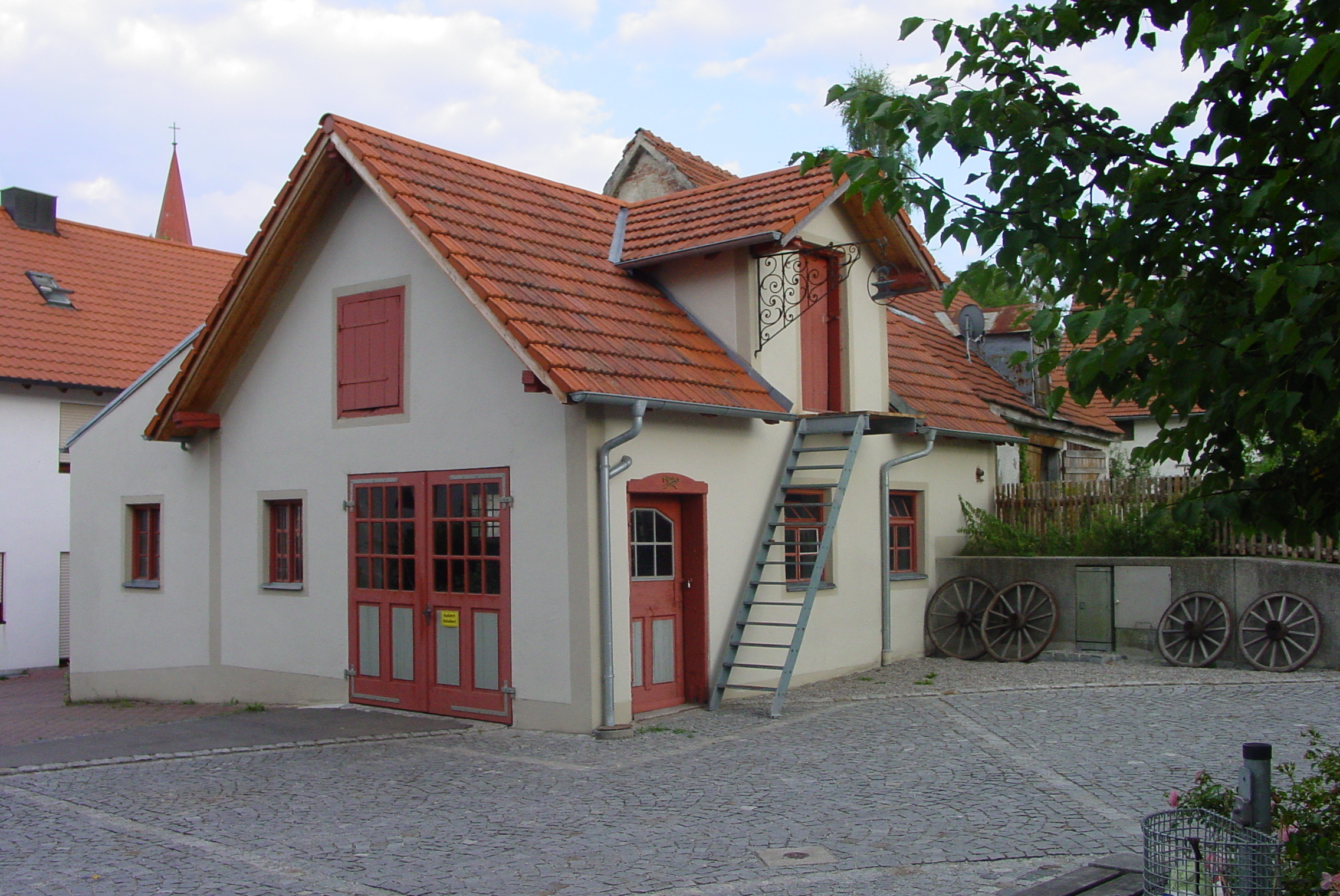
- Old masonry at the village square

- Coat of arms

- Location of Althegnenberg within Fürstenfeldbruck district
- Interactive map of Althegnenberg
- Location within Germany Location within Bavaria
- Coordinates: 48°14′N 11°04′E
- Country: Germany
- State: Bavaria
- Admin. region: Oberbayern
- District: Fürstenfeldbruck
- Municipal assoc.: Mammendorf

Government
  - Mayor (2020–26): Rainer Spicker

Area
  - Total: 16.09 km^{2} (6.21 sq mi)
- Elevation: 536 m (1,759 ft)

Population (2025-12-31)
  - Total: 2,066
  - Density: 128.4/km^{2} (332.6/sq mi)
- Time zone: UTC+01:00 (CET)
  - Summer (DST): UTC+02:00 (CEST)
- Postal codes: 82278
- Dialling codes: 08202
- Vehicle registration: FFB
- Website: www.althegnenberg.de

Althegnenberg is a municipality in the district of Fürstenfeldbruck in Bavaria in Germany. The municipality consists of the villages Althegnenberg, Hörbach and Lindenhof.

== History ==
The first documentary mention of Althegnenberg was made in 1096 as Haginiberc, which translates as " walled settlement on the hill". Hörbach was first mentioned in 1127 as Huruuuinin, meaning "settlement on marshy creek" (from the Middle High German word hurwin for " swampy "). At the southeastern edge of the town is the castle hill - an artificially raised motte that was surrounded by a moat. On the castle hill was the little castle of the Hegnenberger, the Burgstall Althegnenberg in the 12th and 13th centuries.

The Hegnenberger were a family of ministeriales, serving the powerful Guelphs. Engelschalk and Hermann von Hegnenberg were first mentioned in 1192; they came from Swabia (Schmalegg near Ravensburg) and had to protect the Guelph Altomünster Abbey. In their time they were sought-after advisors and confidants of the powerful. They were witnesses at coronations, monastic foundations (Fürstenfeld), and in legal transactions of the church, the country gentlemen and the nobility.

With the death of Welf VI in 1191 the whole Lechrain area passed to the Staufer. Under these, the Hegnenberger rose to become Reichsministerialen. Only after the tragic death of the young king Conradin (1268) the possessions of the Staufer passed to the Wittelsbach family, and came thus to Bavaria. The Hegnenberger served the Wittelsbach family faithfully. They had extensive possessions in Bavaria and Swabia. Around 1300, they left their ancestral seat and built their new castle Hofhegnenberg 4 km to the west of Althegnenberg. During this time, the closed Hofmark Hegnenberg, a legal entity of 7 villages, namely Hofhegnenberg, Althegnenberg, Hörbach, Hausen, Steindorf, Tegernbach and at times also Steinach, was created. The lords of this Hofmark were from 1540 to 1848, the Counts of Hegnenberg - Dux.

In the course of administrative reform in Bavaria of 1818, the municipalities Althegnenberg (consisting of Althegnenberg and Lindenhof) and Hörbach were created. Hörbach became part of Althegnenberg on 1 July 1972 in the course of the municipal reform.
