= Schöngeising =

- Municipality
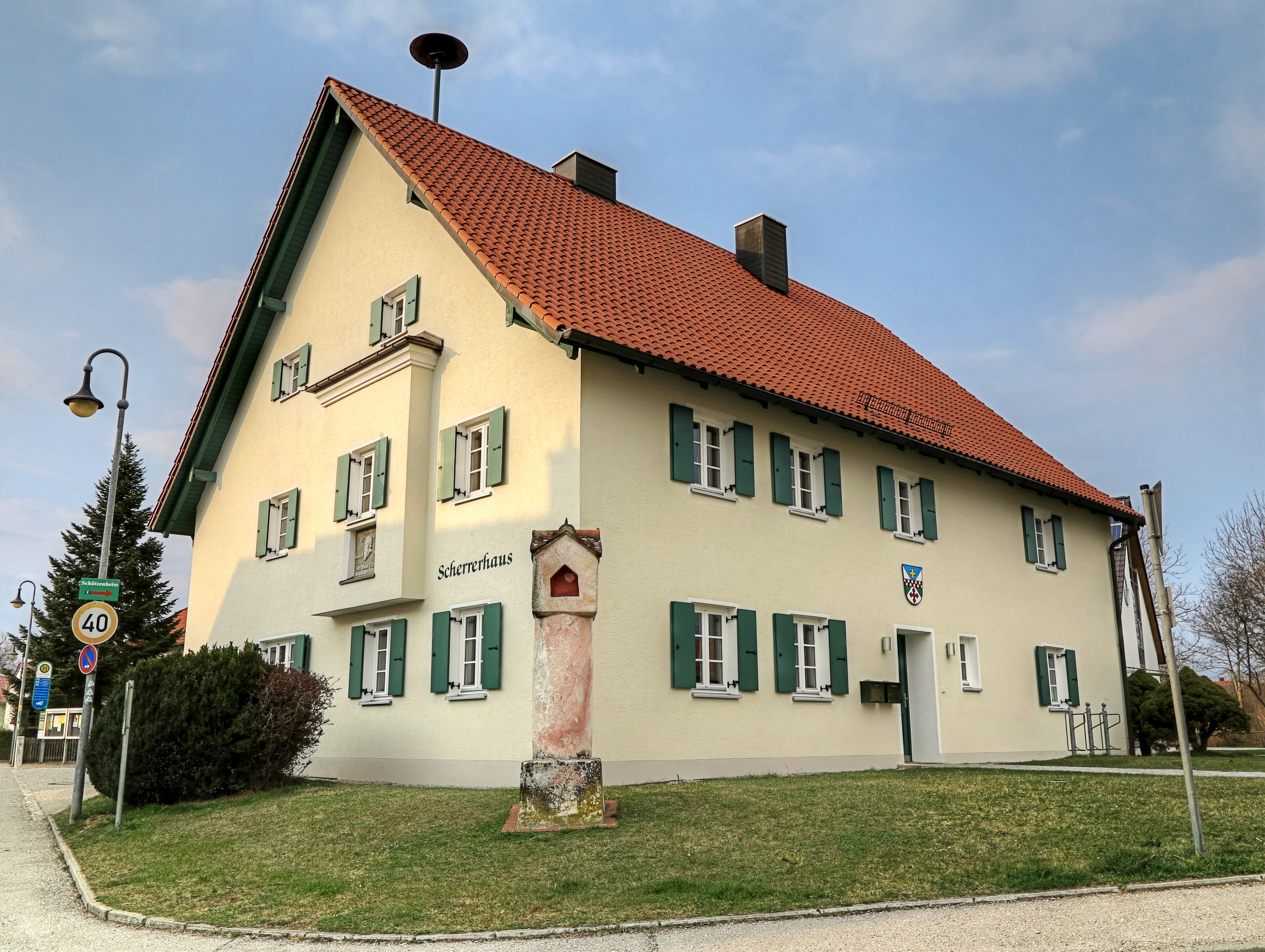
- Town hall

- Coat of arms

- Location of Schöngeising within Fürstenfeldbruck district
- Interactive map of Schöngeising
- Location within Germany Location within Bavaria
- Coordinates: 48°08′N 11°12′E
- Country: Germany
- State: Bavaria
- Admin. region: Oberbayern
- District: Fürstenfeldbruck
- Municipal assoc.: Grafrath
- Subdivisions: 3 Gemeindeteile

Government
  - Mayor (2020–26): Thomas Totzauer

Area
  - Total: 12.86 km^{2} (4.97 sq mi)
- Elevation: 530 m (1,740 ft)

Population (2025-12-31)
  - Total: 1,905
  - Density: 148.1/km^{2} (383.7/sq mi)
- Time zone: UTC+01:00 (CET)
  - Summer (DST): UTC+02:00 (CEST)
- Postal codes: 82296
- Dialling codes: 08141
- Vehicle registration: FFB
- Website: www.schoengeising.de

Schöngeising (German pronunciation: [ʃøːnˈɡaɪzɪŋ]) is a municipality in the district of Fürstenfeldbruck in Bavaria in Germany.
