= Adelshofen, Upper Bavaria =

Adelshofen
- Municipality
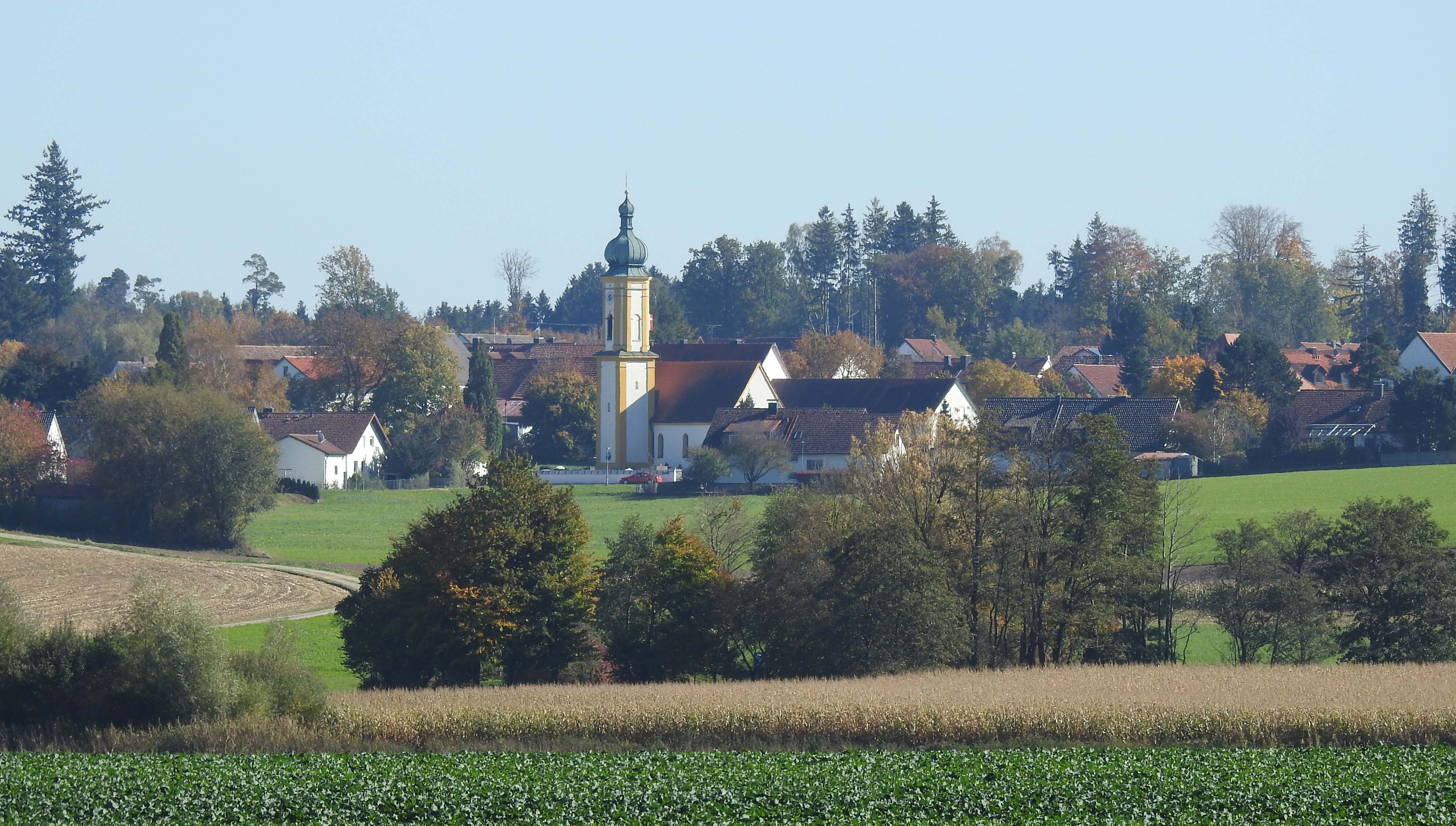
- Adelshofen seen from the northwest

- Coat of arms

- Location of Adelshofen within Fürstenfeldbruck district
- Interactive map of Adelshofen
- Location within Germany Location within Bavaria
- Coordinates: 48°11′N 11°7′E
- Country: Germany
- State: Bavaria
- Admin. region: Oberbayern
- District: Fürstenfeldbruck
- Municipal assoc.: Mammendorf

Government
  - Mayor (2020–26): Robert Bals

Area
  - Total: 13.28 km^{2} (5.13 sq mi)
- Elevation: 556 m (1,824 ft)

Population (2025-12-31)
  - Total: 1,881
  - Density: 141.6/km^{2} (366.8/sq mi)
- Time zone: UTC+01:00 (CET)
  - Summer (DST): UTC+02:00 (CEST)
- Postal codes: 82276
- Dialling codes: 08146
- Vehicle registration: FFB
- Website: www.gemeinde-adelshofen.de

Adelshofen (German pronunciation: [aːdl̩sˈhoːfn̩]) is a municipality in the district of Fürstenfeldbruck in Bavaria in Germany.
