= Landsberied =

- Municipality
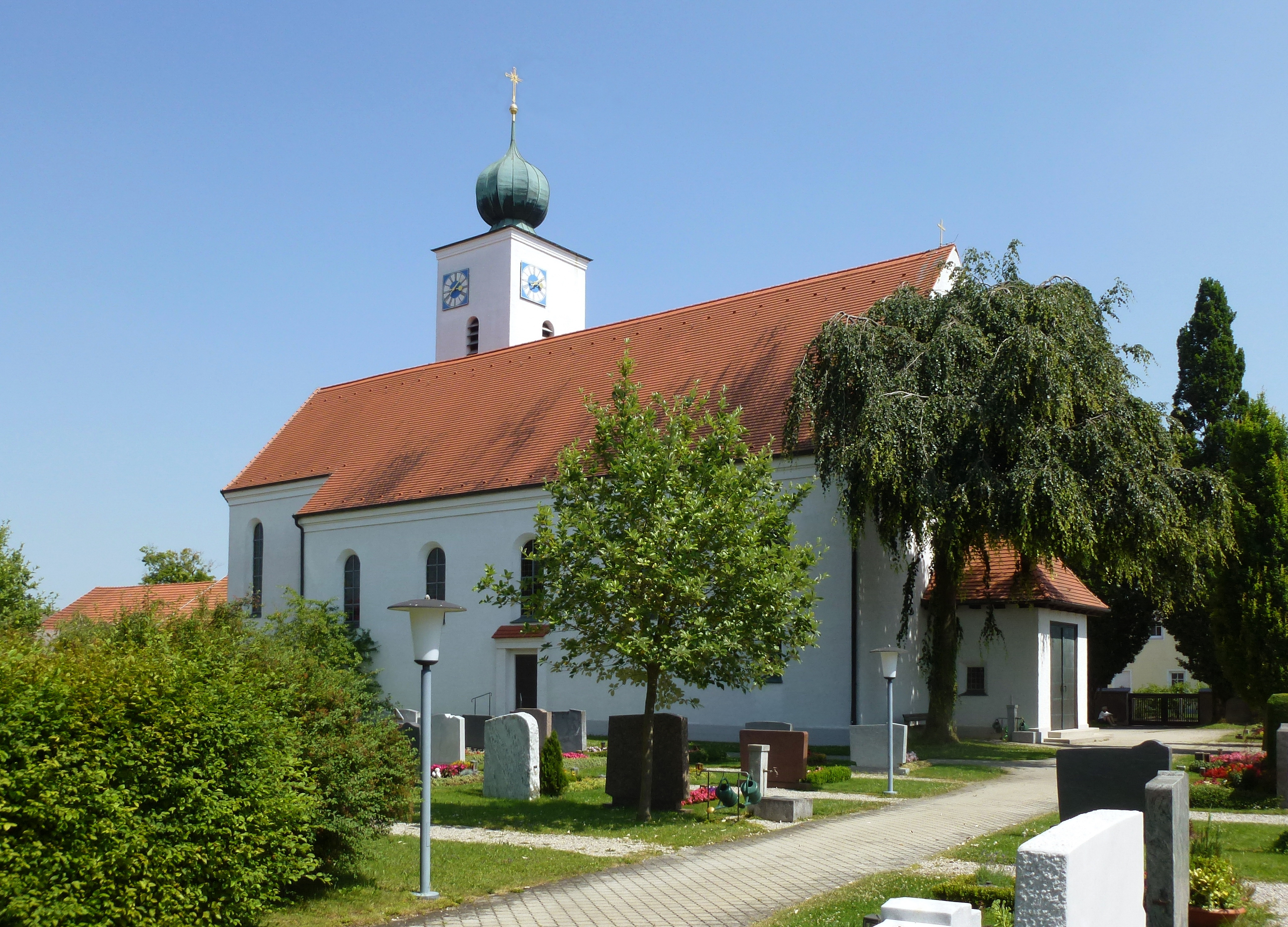
- Church of Saint John the Baptist

- Coat of arms

- Location of Landsberied within Fürstenfeldbruck district
- Interactive map of Landsberied
- Location within Germany Location within Bavaria
- Coordinates: 48°10′N 11°10′E
- Country: Germany
- State: Bavaria
- Admin. region: Oberbayern
- District: Fürstenfeldbruck
- Municipal assoc.: Mammendorf

Government
  - Mayor (2020–26): Andrea Schweitzer (FW)

Area
  - Total: 10.54 km^{2} (4.07 sq mi)
- Elevation: 555 m (1,821 ft)

Population (2025-12-31)
  - Total: 1,581
  - Density: 150.0/km^{2} (388.5/sq mi)
- Time zone: UTC+01:00 (CET)
  - Summer (DST): UTC+02:00 (CEST)
- Postal codes: 82290
- Dialling codes: 08141
- Vehicle registration: FFB
- Website: www.landsberied.de

Landsberied is a municipality in the district of Fürstenfeldbruck in Bavaria in Germany.
