= Hattenhofen, Bavaria =

Hattenhofen
- Municipality
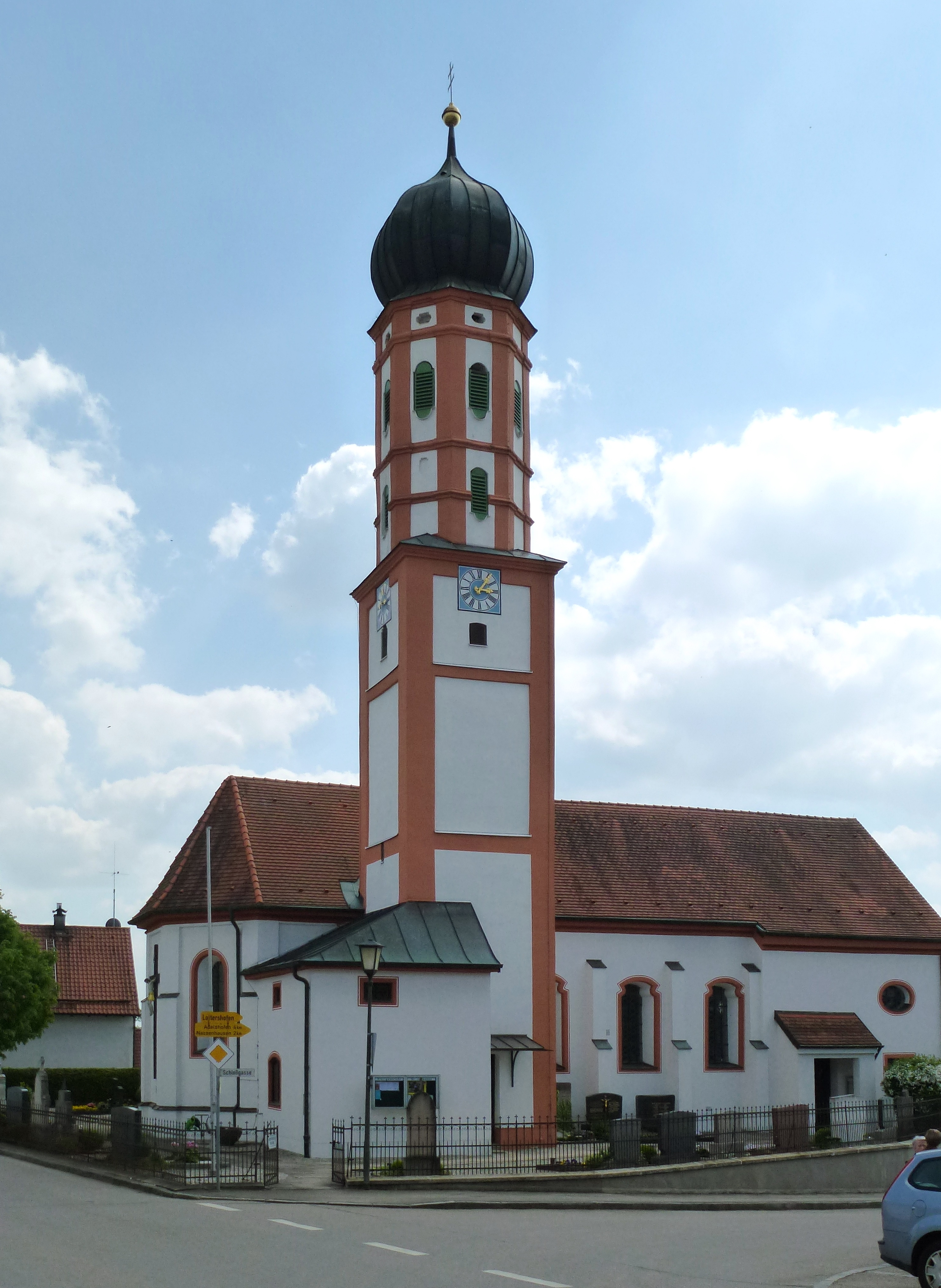
- Church of Saint John the Baptist

- Coat of arms

- Location of Hattenhofen within Fürstenfeldbruck district
- Interactive map of Hattenhofen
- Location within Germany Location within Bavaria
- Coordinates: 48°13′11″N 11°07′00″E
- Country: Germany
- State: Bavaria
- Admin. region: Oberbayern
- District: Fürstenfeldbruck
- Municipal assoc.: Mammendorf

Government
  - Mayor (2020–26): Franz Robeller

Area
  - Total: 7.18 km^{2} (2.77 sq mi)
- Elevation: 556 m (1,824 ft)

Population (2025-12-31)
  - Total: 1,586
  - Density: 221/km^{2} (572/sq mi)
- Time zone: UTC+01:00 (CET)
  - Summer (DST): UTC+02:00 (CEST)
- Postal codes: 82285
- Dialling codes: 08145
- Vehicle registration: FFB
- Website: www.hattenhofen-haspelmoor.de

Hattenhofen (German pronunciation: [hatn̩ˈhoːfn̩]) is a municipality in the district of Fürstenfeldbruck in Bavaria in Germany.
