= Fürstenfeldbruck (district) =

Coordinates: 48°10′N 11°10′E

- District
- Flag Coat of arms
- Country: Germany
- State: Bavaria
- Adm. region: Upper Bavaria
- Capital: Fürstenfeldbruck

Government
  - District admin.: Thomas Karmasin (CSU)

Area
  - Total: 435 km^{2} (168 sq mi)

Population (31 December 2025)
  - Total: 218,580
  - Density: 502/km^{2} (1,300/sq mi)
- Time zone: UTC+01:00 (CET)
  - Summer (DST): UTC+02:00 (CEST)
- Vehicle registration: FFB
- Website: www.lra-ffb.de

Fürstenfeldbruck is a Landkreis (district) in Bavaria, Germany. It is bounded by (from the east and clockwise) the city of Munich and the districts of Munich, Starnberg, Landsberg, Aichach-Friedberg and Dachau.

== History ==
In medieval times the region was a clerical state ruled by the abbey of Fürstenfeld. When the clerical states of Holy Empire were dissolved in 1803, the territory was annexed by Bavaria. The district of Fürstenfeldbruck was established in 1939.

== Geography ==
The district is occupied by the western Munich metropolitan area. It has the highest population density of all Bavarian districts. More than 90 percent of the population lives in the eastern half of the district, which includes the suburbs of Munich.

== Coat of arms ==
- The red and white bar is from the family arms of Saint Bernard, who had been the founder of the Cistercian order (Fürstenfeld was a Cistercian monastery)
- The crown is from the arms of the abbot Alexander Pellhammer
- The bridge represents the city of Bruck (which was later merged with Fürstenfeld to form the city of Fürstenfeldbruck)

== Politics ==
Fürstenfeldbruck (electoral district)

== Towns and municipalities ==
Clickable map of towns and municipalities in the district

Towns
1. Fürstenfeldbruck
2. Germering
3. Olching
4. Puchheim
Municipalities
1. Alling
2. Egenhofen
3. Eichenau
4. Emmering

5. Gröbenzell
6. Maisach
7. Moorenweis
8. Türkenfeld

Verwaltungsgemeinschaften
1. Grafrath; 1. Grafrath^{1}; 2. Kottgeisering; 3. Schöngeising	2. Mammendorf; 1. Adelshofen; 2. Althegnenberg; 3. Hattenhofen; 4. Jesenwang; 5. Landsberied; 6. Mammendorf^{1}; 7. Mittelstetten; 8. Oberschweinbach
^{1}seat of the Verwaltungsgemeinschaft
