= Windach (river) =

River of Bavaria, Germany

- The Windach in Greifenberg, near Greifenberg Castle

Location
- Country: Germany
- State: Bavaria

Physical characteristics
- Mouth
  - location: Amper
  - coordinates: 48.0809°N 11.1329°E
- Length: 35.8 km (22.2 mi)
- Basin size: 129 km^{2} (50 sq mi)

Basin features
- Progression: Amper→ Isar→ Danube→ Black Sea

Windach (German pronunciation: [ˈvɪndax]) is a river of Bavaria, Germany. It flows into the Amper near Eching am Ammersee.

== See also ==
- List of rivers of Bavaria
