= Langwieder Bach =

River in Germany

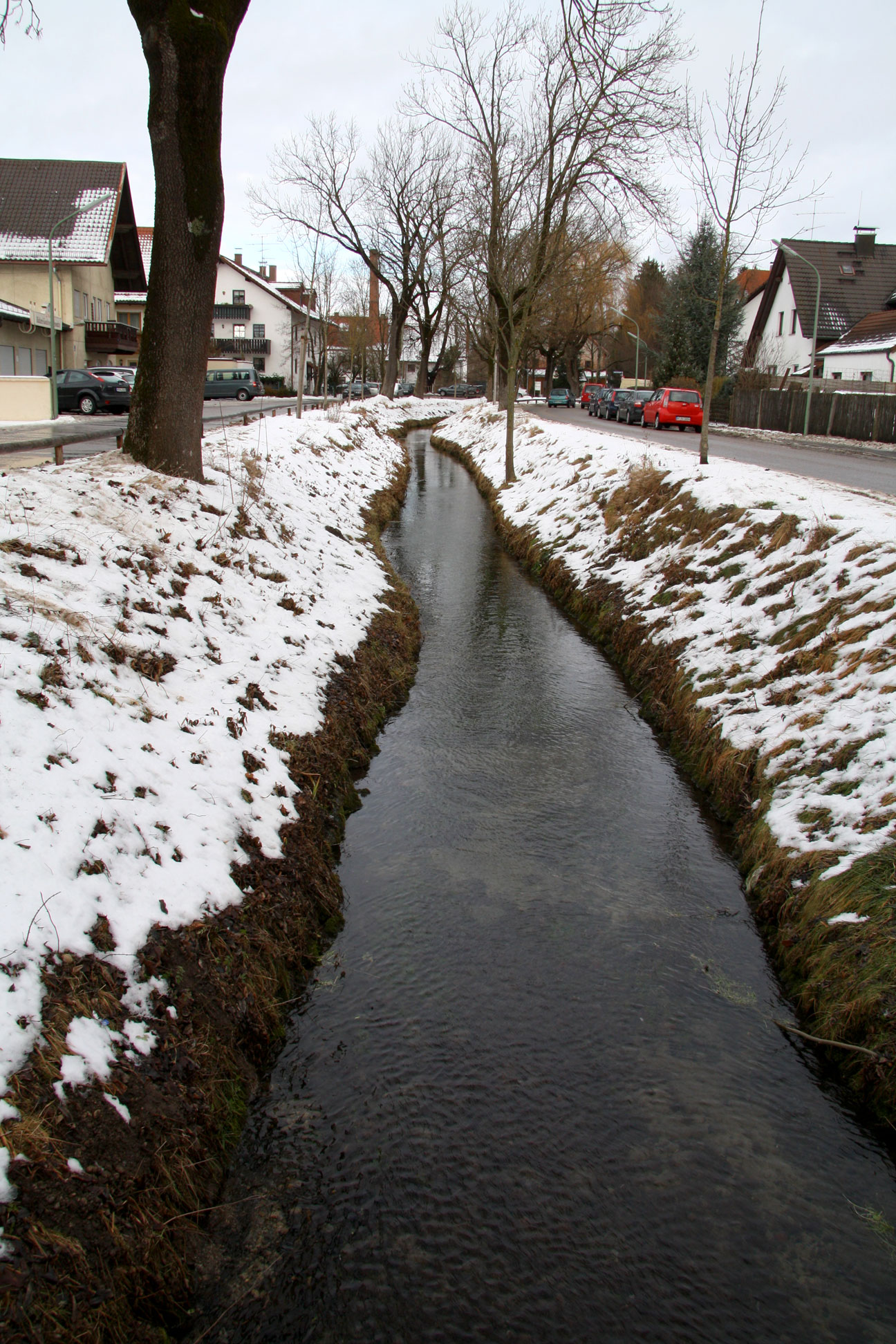
- The Langwieder Bach in Langwied, a district of Munich

Location
- Country: Germany
- States: Bavaria

Physical characteristics
- Mouth
  - location: Gröbenbach
  - coordinates: 48.2186°N 11.4256°E

Basin features
- Progression: Gröbenbach→ Amper→ Isar→ Danube→ Black Sea

Langwieder Bach is a river of Bavaria, Germany. It flows into the Gröbenbach south of Dachau.

== See also ==
- List of rivers of Bavaria
