= Schondorf =

Schondorf am Ammersee
- Municipality
- Coat of arms

- Location of Schondorf am Ammersee within Landsberg district
- Interactive map of Schondorf am Ammersee
- Location within Germany Location within Bavaria
- Coordinates: 48°03′10″N 11°05′27″E
- Country: Germany
- State: Bavaria
- Admin. region: Upper Bavaria
- District: Landsberg
- Municipal assoc.: Schondorf
- Subdivisions: 2 Quarters

Government
  - Mayor (2020–26): Alexander Herrmann (Greens)

Area
  - Total: 6.59 km^{2} (2.54 sq mi)
- Elevation: 565 m (1,854 ft)

Population (2025-12-31)
  - Total: 3,770
  - Density: 572/km^{2} (1,480/sq mi)
- Time zone: UTC+01:00 (CET)
  - Summer (DST): UTC+02:00 (CEST)
- Postal codes: 86938
- Dialling codes: 08192
- Vehicle registration: LL
- Website: www.schondorf.info

Schondorf am Ammersee (German pronunciation: [ˈʃoːnˌdɔʁf ʔam ˈʔamɐˌzeː], lit. 'Schondorf on the Ammersee') is a municipality in the district Landsberg am Lech, Bavaria, Germany and is a member of the municipal association Schondorf am Ammersee The municipal association based in Schondorf.

== Geography ==
=== Geographical Location ===
Schondorf is a climatic spa village. It is located about 40 kilometres (25 miles) west of Munich and about 40 kilometres (25 miles) southeast of Augsburg on the western shore of lake Ammersee in the district of Landsberg am Lech.

As the place is on the edge of Lake Ammersee, is the maximum height difference in the municipality area is 70 metres (77 yards).

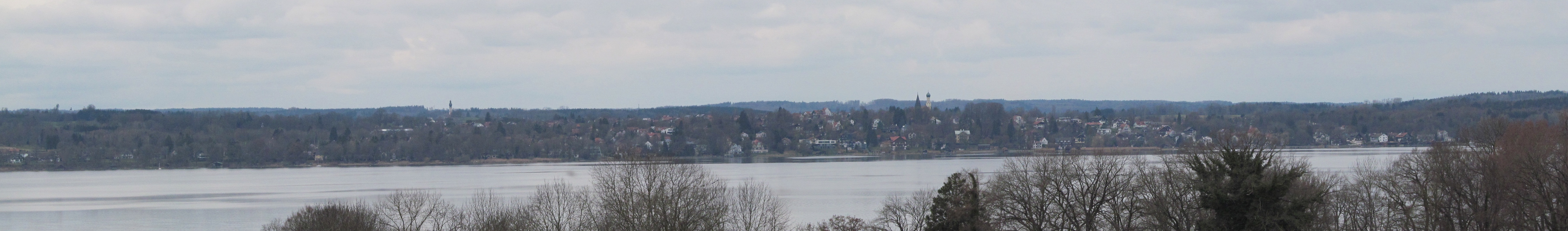
Panoramic picture Schondorf, viewed from the east

=== Expansion of the municipality ===
The area of the municipality is 6.56 km^{2} (2.53 sq mi). The maximum amount of extension in the north–south direction is 4 km (2.5 mi) and west–east direction 2.5 km (1.6 mi).

=== Municipality in the neighborhood ===
The neighboring municipalities of Schondorf are: Greifenberg in the north, Eching am Ammersee in the north-east, Utting in the south and Windach in the west.

=== Subdivisions ===
Schondorf has two subdivisions: Oberschondorf on the western and upper side and Unterschondorf on the eastern and lower side.

== History ==
=== Settlement before the local establishment ===
The first finds of human settlement extending to the hallstatt culture. (back to 750-450 BC). To suggest that in the municipality found 14 burial mounds. In the area of present-day communal bathing site in 1924, a 20 m × 7.5 m (21.9 yd × 8.2 yd) wide bathing area of a Roman villa from the 3rd century AD excavated. Further traces of a settlement can be found from the period after the Roman Empire from the period 500-700 AD (skeletons and grave goods with a lance).

=== The first written reference till High Middle Ages ===
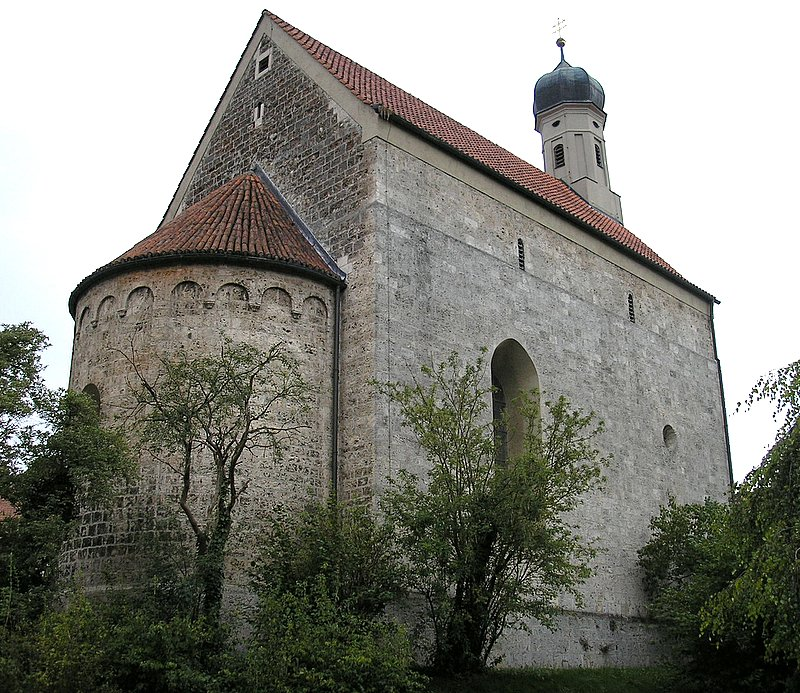
Jakobskirche in Schondorf

Schondorf was first mentioned in 751 as a count Engildeo from the noble family of Huosi including its goods delivered in "Scondorf" the Benediktbeuern Abbey. This property was in course of time lost. Subsequently, there was a local Nobility (German: derer von Schondorf). These built Jacob's Church in 1150. In Oberschondorf, the present church in 1284 by the Bavarian duke to the Dießen Abby was given.

=== High Middle Ages till 1818 ===
Only since the High Middle Ages a distinction was made between Ober- and Unterschondorf. Each farm in Oberschondorf belonged to the Andechs Abbey. Each half was owned by Adelheid von Pergen and the other half by Kunigunde von Schondorf-Hechenwang. Unterschondorf at the time was owned by the Earl of Greifenberg. Through the establishment of the Benedictine monastery Andechs, in Unterschondorf changed the ownership to Ernest, Duke of Bavaria and Albert III, Duke of Bavaria.

In the 15th century, Ober- and Unterschondorf was a part of the "Hofmark Greifenberg". 1507 bought the Hofmark Erhard von Perfall.

As the number of inhabitants in Oberschondorf increases steadily, built provost Johannes Zallinger a new church. This church was made 1499 completed and was dedicated to St. Martin of Tours. The weekly mass were held by the "Gesellpriester" from Utting. Since this is not the Oberschondorf citizens promised, it has made efforts to their own priest. The Sigel Official accounts of the Diocesan Augsburg show Wolfgang Ostler in 1520 as the first Catholic priest.

During the Thirty Years' War in 1628 and 1629 pulled the plague more than Half of the inhabitants of Schondorf. In 1633 Swedish troops marched along the western shore of the Ammersee Lake and plundered probably Schondorf.

Towards the end of the 17th century was the parish church in Oberschondorf and the St. Jacob Church in Unterschondorf undergo a renovation. This was particularly the choir altar, the pulpit and the seating.

Through the secularization in 1803, the Bavarian state was the landlord in Schondorf. In the course of administrative reform in the Kingdom of Bavaria was created with the municipal edict of 1818 the municipalities Oberschondorf and Unterschondorf.

=== 1818–1970 ===
In the time of the German Revolution of 1848 Schondorf was incorporated within the jurisdiction of the "Landsberg district court" (German: Landsberger Landgericht).

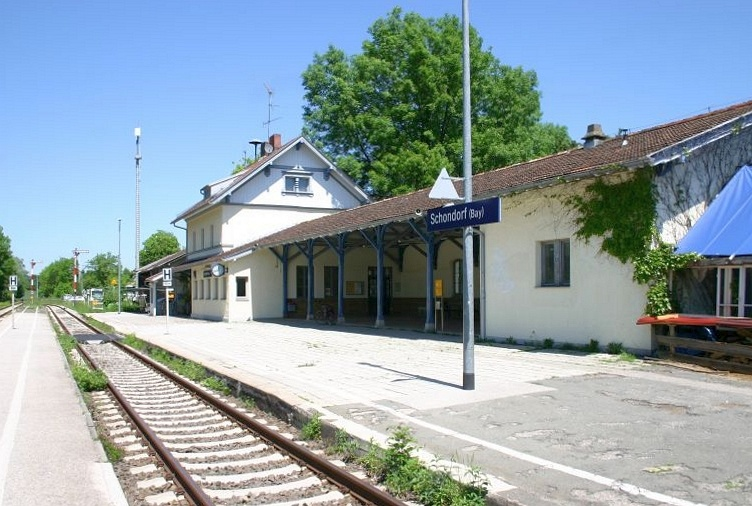
Station "Schondorf"

The opening of the Ammersee Railway was on 30 June 1898. Schondorf was present, the southern terminus. The final gap to Dießen am Ammersee was on 24 December 1898. The station was built on the subdivision border between Ober- and Unterschondorf, and even then bore the name "Schondorf". The station building here was only made of corrugated iron huts. A wooden building was only about to 1902nd.

1909 was the first screw steamer called "Schondorf" on the Ammersee launching. The ship had 80 HP (58 KW) and could carry 120 people. It was completed in 1956 out of service.

In 1912 the two villages have been connected to the electrical power grid. With the division gymnastics the local sports club (TSV 1920 Schondorf) was established by 27 founding members in 1920.

The station building was built in 1934 fundamentally new. The technical facilities that were previously in the open, got one enclosure. These have not yet installed additional electrical installations that were not exposed to the rain.

During the Second World War, the two municipalities were not even affected. In April 1945, American troops moved into Schondorf. It followed a three-week occupation by French troops.

The German economic miracle was reflected in the Schondorf-based communities. There were not only improved the road conditions, but also promoted the expansion of water supply and construction of housing for refugees and German displaced persons.

In 1961, the second ship named "Schondorf" with 225 HP (195 KW) was put into service.

==== 1818–1970 in Oberschondorf ====
The size of the agricultural area in the upper subdivision was twice as large the lower subdivision. There were mainly farms with high agricultural capacity.

The mid-1830s opened the first restaurant (Sailer).

In the First World War had some bells of St. Anne Church be made to serve the war effort. In 1925 the company Hirt was able to pour in Kempten shepherd through donations from the public and through a foundation of three new bells. But back in 1942 had four bells for the production of shells are given.

==== 1818–1970 in Unterschondorf ====
The lower subdivision was inhabited by fishermen and small farmers. These were not economically as strong as in the upper subdivision. Only with development of the tourist accommodation at beginning of the 20th century, the situation improved the situation of the inhabitants of Unterschondorf.

Founded in 1876, the volunteer fire department.

On 14 September 1905 founded the evangelical pastor Julius Lohmann, the South German boarding school (German: Süddeutsche Landerziehungsheim), today call Stiftung Landheim Schondorf.

On 5 January 1919, a storm surge occurred on the Ammersee. This tore numerous pontoons. Similarly, broken-reed was thrown over the sea wall.

In the 1920s and 1930s, Toni Ruhr built in the waterfront in the south of the dock.

With the seizure of the Nazis, the Unterschondorf-based Joachim von Moltke took over the mayor's office, but was soon out district leader of the district of Landsberg am Lech.

After the war the American troops seized some houses at the Ammersee. In the boarding school has been set up for a short time a hospital for displaced persons.

The repair of the waterfront in 1950 was sore now expanded to the north. In Unterschondorf a new parish church (Heilig Kreuz) was built in 1954.

=== Since 1970 ===
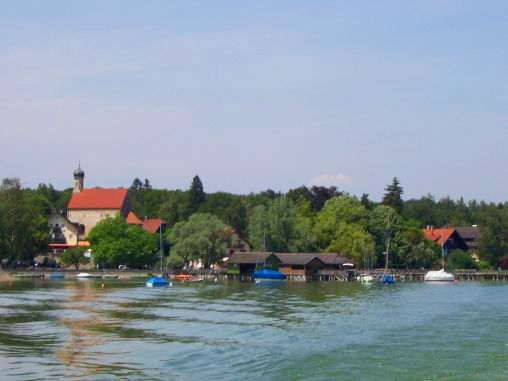
View from the lake: waterfront with the Church of Saint James

On 1 January 1970 the independent municipalities were merged. For this purpose, a new town hall in the new center of the municipality was built. The old halls of Ober- an Unterschondorf already been converted into social housing.

It was created by a regulation of the Government of Upper Bavaria from 1 May 1978, the municipal association Schondorf am Ammersee (German: Verwaltungsgemeinschaft Schondorf a. Ammersee). Thus, the administrations of the autonomous communities continue to exist Schondorf, Greifenberg Eching and have been combined. The seat of the administration is Schondorf.

On the evening of 15 September 1981, was the abduction of the ten-year pupil Ursula Herrmann. She was on the way from her grandmother in Schondorf to Eching am Ammersee. The child was in a 72 cm × 60 cm × 139 cm (28in × 24in × 66in) in the forest "Weingarten" locked and buried. Since the ventilation tube was too long, the girl suffocated after several hours. It has demanded a ransom of two million DM (1.02 million euros), whose transfer it never came. The body was found on 4 October 1982. The prosecutor started the investigation. The investigation led in May 2008 on the arrest of a 58-year-old man in Kappeln. In an evidence of this process was on 25 March 2010 convicted of kidnapping resulting in death to life imprisonment.

As a result of heavy rainfall (up to 180 L/m^{2}) exceeded the Ammersee in the Pentecostal floods of 1999 its average water level about two meters. The promenade and the adjoining lake road were flooded.

In August 2005, the tracks at the station Schondorf was rebuilt. Since then, there are no plant and goods tracks.

In 2010, there was an energy modernization of the City Hall. It could be an energy savings of 65 percent. The budget for the renovation is in the range of 1.5 million euros. The grant from the economic stimulus package (German: Konjunkturpaket II) amounts to approximately 720,100 euros.

=== Population development ===
Residents Oberschondorf 1832–1970
| 1832 | 340 Residents |
| 1840 | 323 Residents |
| 1890 | 359 Residents |
| 1895 | 270 Residents |
| 1900 | 423 Residents |
| 1925 | 465 Residents |
| 1931 | 523 Residents |
| 1933 | 526 Residents |
| 1945 | 742 Residents |
| 1950 | 854 Residents |
| 1951 | 850 Residents |
| 1962 | 820 Residents |
| 1970 | 837 Residents |

Residents Unterschondorf 1840–1970
| 1840 | 195 Residents |
| 1900 | 183 Residents |
| 1910 | 378 Residents |
| 1925 | 623 Residents |
| 1931 | 676 Residents |
| 1939 | 707 Residents |
| 1945 | 1317 Residents |
| 1950 | 1214 Residents |
| 1970 | 1302 Residents |

Residents Schondorf since 1970
| Mid 1970 | 2004 Residents |
| Mid 1987 | 2930 Residents |
| End of 2009 | 3973 Residents |

== Politics ==
The municipal tax revenue in 1999 amounted 2.107 million euros, of which amounted to the business tax receipts (net) 338 000 euros.

=== Municipal council ===
The current municipal council was elected in local elections in Bavaria 2008:

The distribution of seats in municipal council
| Jahr | CSU | SPD | Grüne | FWG | Total | Turnout |
|---|---|---|---|---|---|---|
| 2008 | 7 | 3 | 3 | 3 | 16 | 60,8% |
| 2002 | 8 | 3 | 0 | 5 | 16 | 67,6% |

=== Mayors ===
In March 2014, Alexander Herrmann (Grüne) was elected mayor. He was re-elected in March 2020. Former mayors of the village:

Mayors Unterschondorf 1877–1970
| 1877–1887 | Thomas Marx |
| 1887 | Georg Böck |
| 1887–1894 | Johann Bapt. Limm |
| 1894–1900 | Georg Böck |
| 1900–1906 | Georg Ernst |
| 1906–1912 | Johann Bapt. Limm |
| 1912–1933 | Jakob Böck |
| 1933 | Joachim von Moltke |
| 1933–1934 | Jakob Böck |
| 1934–1943 | Johannes Bauer |
| 1943–1945 | Alois Ortner |
| 1945 | temporary: Johannes Bauer; Dr. H. Däumling; Freiherr von Perfall; Hugo Höchtl |
| 1946–1970 | Hugo Höchtl |

Mayors Oberschondorf 1892–1970
| 1892–1926 | Georg Drexl |
| 1926–1927 | Georg Baur |
| 1927–1933 | Johann Stangl |
| 1933–1945 | Josef Drexl |
| 1945–1946 | Hugo Höchtl |
| 1946–1970 | Mathias Wagner |

Mayors Schondorf since 1970
| 1970–1990 | Alois Metzger |
| 1990–2006 | Gerd Hoffmann |
| 2006–2014 | Peter Wittmaack |
| since 2014 | Alexander Herrmann |

=== Coat of Arms ===
Blazon: In red with two silver strips of the shaft body of a silver unicorn with gold-winning blue rock golden ring on the horn.

== Arts and Culture ==
The former parish church of St. Anna on the hill in the north of the municipality is already clearly visible from distance. It was built by the monastery Dießen in 1499. In the second gallery of the church is a historic organ of the 18th century. Around the church is a cemetery with some very old grave stones, surrounded by walls and houses.

The romanesque church of St. Jakob is probably from 1150.

=== Sports ===
The local sports club (TSV 1920 Schondorf) consists of eight departments (ice stock sport, Soccer for youth, Soccer for Seniors, Skigymnastik, Taekwondo, Tennis, Table tennis, Gymnastics/Track and field, Volleyball) with 1,300 members.

== Economy and infrastructure ==
=== Transportation ===
Schondorf has a station on the Ammersee Railway. From there, a connection is possible to Augsburg, Weilheim and Diessen. Also buses towards Landsberg am Lech.

The Staatsstraße 2055 (Dießen – Greifenberg) runs through Schondorf. Into this Staatsstraße the Staatsstraße 2346 lead at the railway crossing on the northern outskirts. The remaining streets are local roads. All local roads are Zones 30.

On the Ammersee ships of the "Bayerische Seenschifffahrt" sail to Stegen, Herrsching and Dießen in travel direction.

=== Education ===
Following institutions exist in 2007:

- Kindergarten with 100 children
- Elementary school (German: Grundschule) with 7 teachers and 126 pupils
- secondary school (German: Realschule) mit etwa 40 teachers and 700 pupils
- Folk high school Ammersee-Northwest (German: Volkshochschule Ammersee-Nordwest): This Folk high school is the municipal facility of Utting am Ammersee and the municipal association Schondorf am Ammersee with their communities Eching am Ammersee, Greifenberg and Schondorf am Ammersee.

Also located here the Landheim Schondorf. The boarding school has 290 students. These come from all over Germany and abroad. In addition to the high school education, participation in craft, sporting and musical workshops is mandatory.

=== Economy, agriculture and forestry ===
In 1998 there were no social welfare workers at the workplace according to official statistics in the industrial sector 230 and in trade and transport. In other areas, 258 persons were employed at the workplace. Employees at home there 920 altogether. In manufacturing, there were none in the construction industry six businesses. Also eight agricultural holdings with agricultural area of 179 ha (440 acres) in 1999 were, of which 103 ha (250 acres) was meadowland and 76 ha (190 acres) was meadowland.

== Personalities ==
- Johannes Gaitanides
- Hans Erich Pfitzner
- Tadeusz Stefan Zieliński

=== Honorary citizen ===
- Willi Wagner

== Literature ==
- Weidacher, Werner (1996), Schondorf – Das Dorf und seine Menschen in alten Aufnahmen (in German) (1 ed.), Horb am Neckar: Geiger-Verlag, ISBN 3-89570-178-5
