= Hoher Peißenberg =

Coordinates: 47°48′03″N 11°00′48″E

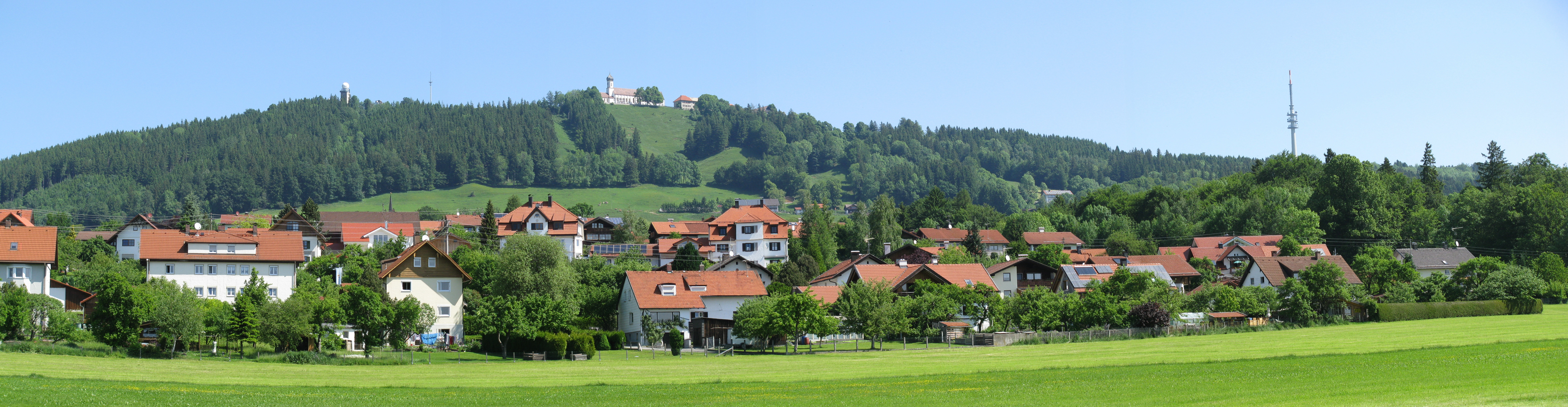
- Hohenpeißenberg and Hoher Peißenberg, view from the railway tracks

Highest point
- Elevation: 988 m (3,241 ft)

Geography
- Location: Bavaria, Germany

Hoher Peißenberg is a mountain of Bavaria, Germany.

== Location ==
The standalone Hoher Peißenberg ("High mount Peißen") is located in the middle of the Pfaffenwinkel region, in the Bavarian Prealps, in the Weilheim-Schongau district. Its summit and a large part of its uplands are part of the Hohenpeißenberg municipality, the centre of which is located some 900m from the summit in a southern direction. Some of the lower eastern part belong to the market municipality of Peißenberg, the centre of which is located 3.5 km to the east of the summit. The mountain extends from east to west and is partially wooded.

== Buildings ==
Buildings on the Peißenberg include a pilgrimage church with a museum, a meteorological observatory and a broadcasting tower:

=== Pilgrimage church ===
On the mountain is the pilgrimage church of the Assumption. The earliest section, of what was later to become a double church, is the chapel of the year 1514. In the early 17th century, a larger church with a clergy house included was added. The pilgrimage has a long tradition of hundreds of years, and every summer, a pilgrimage where the pilgrims wear national costume takes place. In 1990, a museum was opened in the oratory above the sacristy of the church and can be visited on request.

=== Hohenpeißenberg meteorological observatory ===
The Hohenpeißenberg Meteorological Observatory, which weather observation and research facilities, is also located on the mountain. The meteorological observations reach back to 1 January 1781, almost without interruption. The weather station is regarded as the oldest mountain weather station in the world.

=== Hohenpeißenberg broadcasting tower ===
Near the summit, in the Hohenpeißenberg hamlet of Pröbstlsberg, is the Hohenpeißenberg radio transmitter. This TV tower, built in 1978, has a height of 158.76 metres.

== Panoramic view ==
On a clear day, the mountain offers a panoramic view in the southern side of the 200 km-wide Alpine chain from the Grünten in the west, across the Wetterstein range with the Zugspitze in the south, to the Chiemgau Alps in the east. Because of its beautiful Alpine view, it is a popular destination for excursions, and it can be seen from 400 different places (towns, villages, hamlets, districts). Three bigger lakes are visible, with the Ammersee in a north-north-east direction. In an east-north-east direction, a small part of Lake Starnberg can be seen, and to the south-east direction the Staffelsee.
