= Kleine Ammer =

River in Germany

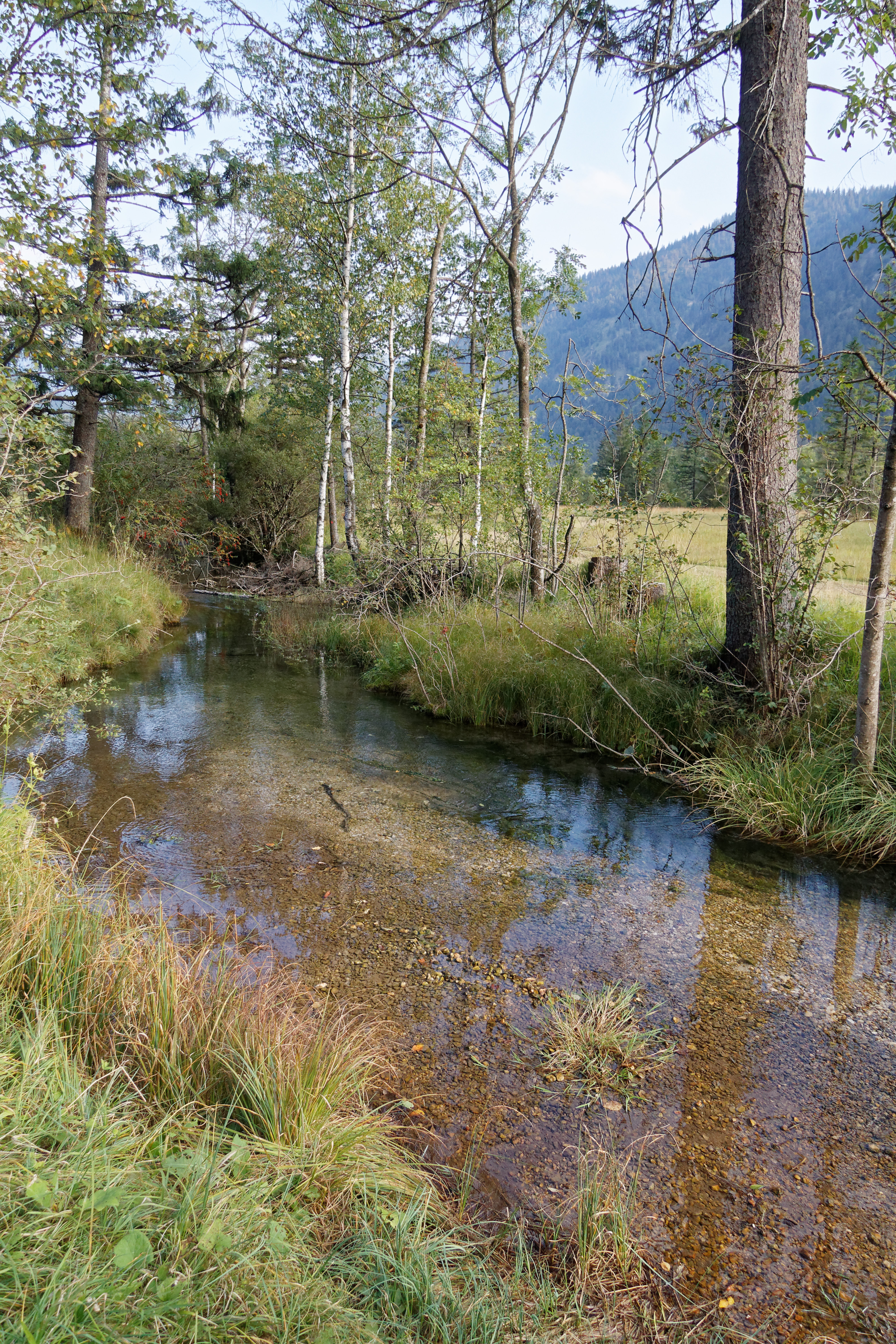
- The Kleine Ammer at the edge of the Naturschutzgebiet Ettaler Weidmoos in Oberammergau

Location
- Country: Germany
- States: Bavaria

Physical characteristics
- Mouth
  - location: Ammer
  - coordinates: 47.5830°N 11.0728°E

Basin features
- Progression: Amper→ Isar→ Danube→ Black Sea

Kleine Ammer is a short river of Bavaria, Germany. It flows into the Ammer near Oberammergau.

== See also ==
- List of rivers of Bavaria
