= Schwebelbach =

River in Germany

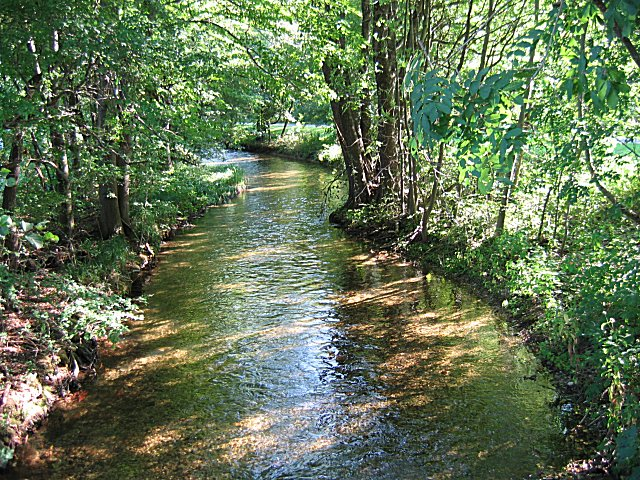
- The Schwebelbach near the Oberschleißheim Regatta Course

Location
- Country: Germany
- State: Bavaria

Physical characteristics
- Mouth
  - location: Amper
  - coordinates: 48.3038°N 11.5298°E

Basin features
- Progression: Amper→ Isar→ Danube→ Black Sea

Schwebelbach is a river of Bavaria, Germany. It flows into the Amper near Haimhausen.

== See also ==
- List of rivers of Bavaria
