= Kohlbach =

Kohlbach may refer to:

Geography

- Kohlbach (Ammer), a river in Bavaria, Germany
- Kohlbach (Gersprenz), a river in Hesse, Germany

Surname

- Veronika Kohlbach (1906–1996), an Austrian Olympic track and field athlete
