= Perfall =

Family

The Perfall family is a distinguished Bavarian family whose members are a part of the German nobility. This aristocratic family hails from Greifenberg, a village near the Ammersee. The Schloss Greifenberg and its many acres of forestry exist primarily as a family home today.

== History ==
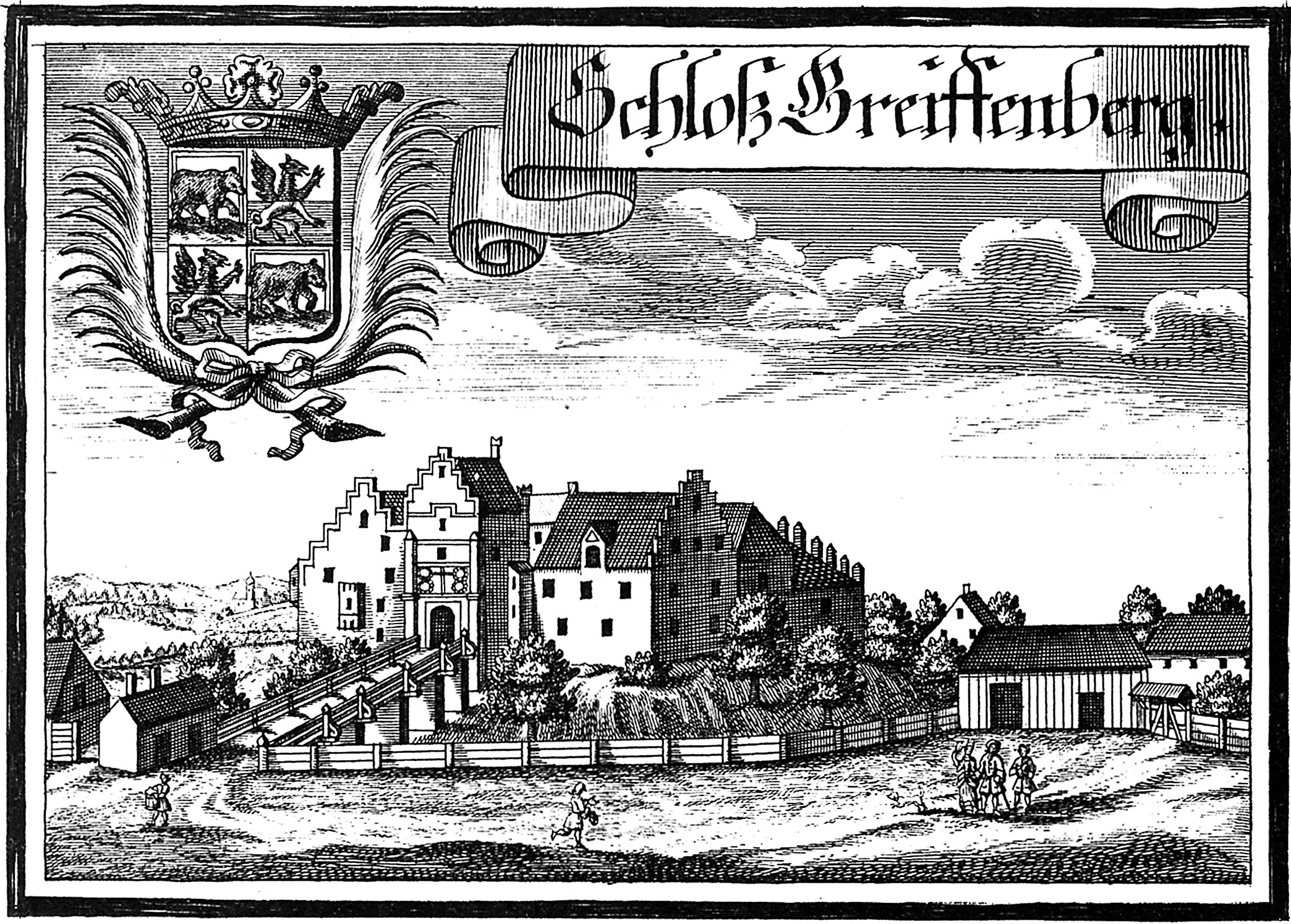
A copperplate etching of the castle by Michael Wening from the later 17th century

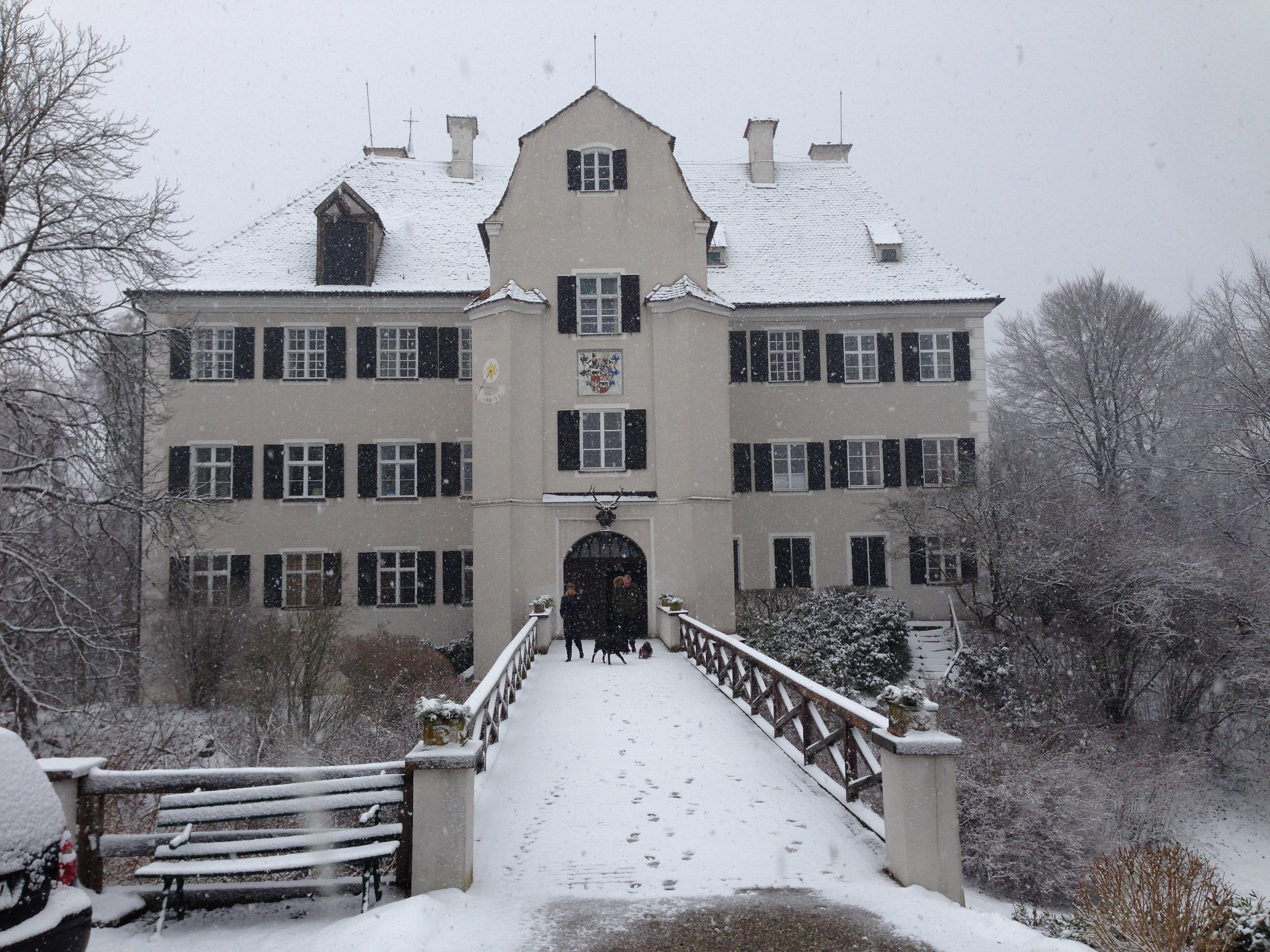
A photo of the family's castle in wintertime

The family's origins can be traced back to 1355 in the book Ulrich dem Pervaller. At that point, the family called themselves the "Perfaller." Only later, in the 17th century, would these nobles adopt the aristocratic Von in their surnames.

In 1478, Erhard der Perfaller acquired Schloss from the King of Bavaria. The castle and its sprawling estate was ideally located in the village of Greifenberg on the lake Ammersee. The family would later own other estates, including one in Mehl, Schenkens, Freienhausen, Perfall, and in central Munich, however these were lost either by inheritance on the female line or sale.

In 1685, Johann Ferdinand von Perfall was granted the title of Baron (Freiherr) by the Bavarian state. The family would go on to produce several prominent and notable members in politics and art.

== Crest ==
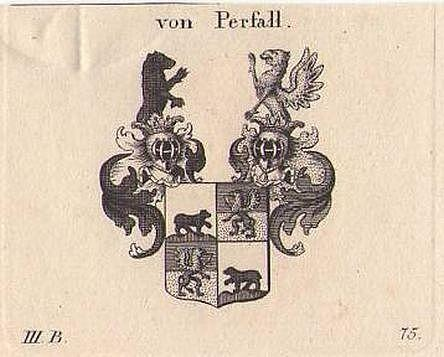
The earliest iteration of the crest, c. 1850 century

The modern coat of arms depicts a black bear walking on a red mountain. Dreiberg and Bär, from the arms of the Perfall family, appear today in the municipal coat of arms of Greifenberg.

== Today ==
Members of this noble family have historically, remained discreet. In recent years; however, there have been a number of notable weddings including that of Baroness Josephine von Perfall to Ferdinand von Humboldt of Berlin (descendant of philosopher Wilhelm von Humboldt), Baroness Antonia von Perfall and Henrich Munte of Frankfurt, and Baron Alexander von Perfall to the daughter of William vanden Heuvel, Ashley Fuller Pierce. The castle hosts several events for the village annually.

== Notable Family Members ==
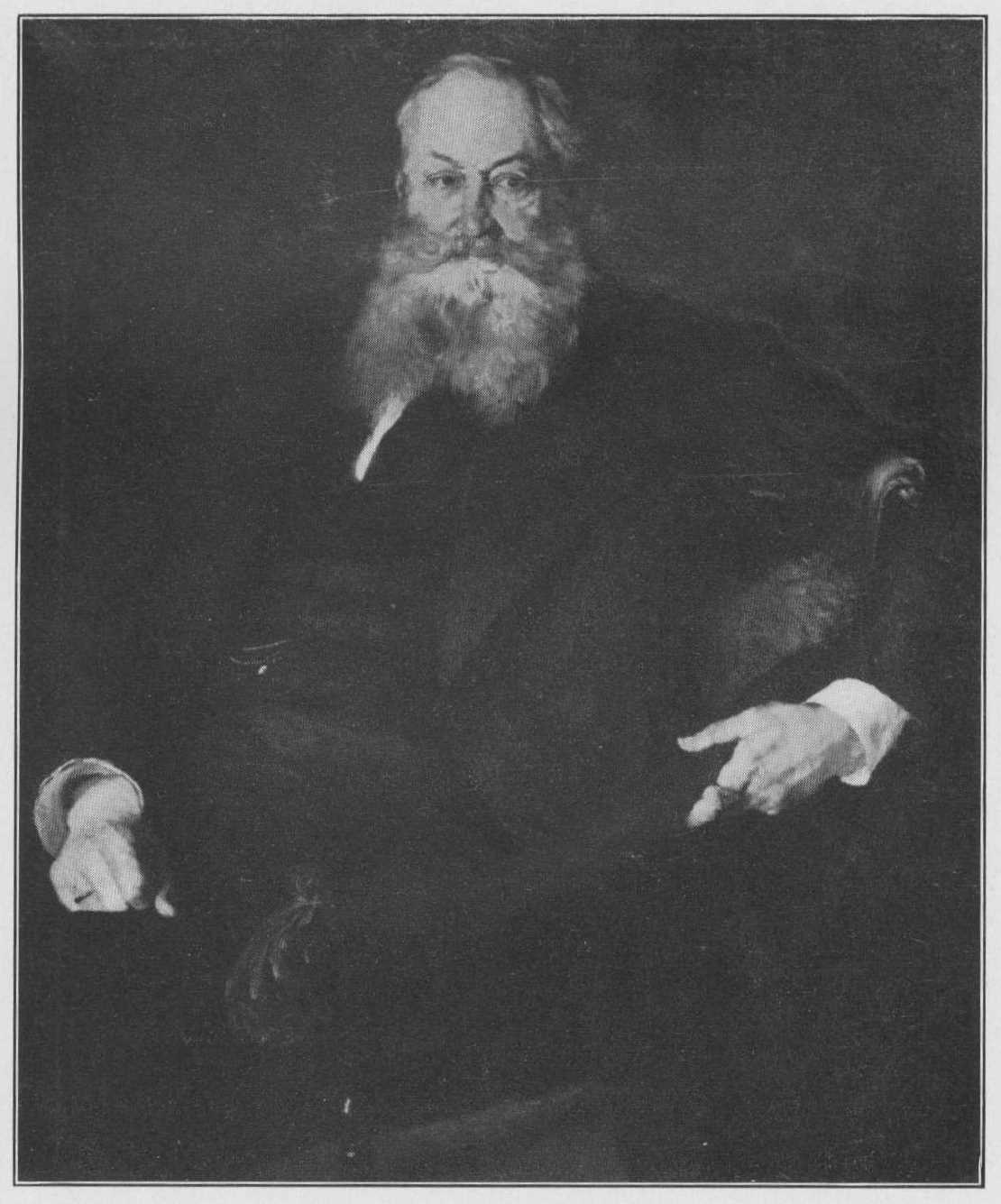
Legendary Bavarian conductor Karl von Perfall

Listed chronologically by birth date

- Johann Maximilian Joseph von Perfall (1682–1752), electoral chamberlain, Hofrat, Oberhofmeister and alchemist
- Maximilian von Perfall (1814–1877), electoral chamberlain and government councilor
- Karl von Perfall (1824–1907), lawyer, composer and director of the Bavarian Court Theater.
- Ludwig von Perfall (1851–1910), Bavarian General and royal chamberlain
- Karl von Perfall (1851–1924), Writer and art critic
- Anton Alexander Albrecht Freiherr von Perfall (1853–1912), Bruder von Karl, renowned hunting writer, ∞ Magda Irschick (1871–1935),
- Emanuel von Perfall (1853–1943), royal Bavarian chamberlain and court marshal
- Julie von Perfall (1858–1926), musician and actress, ∞ Otto Hierl-Deronco
- Franz Freiherr von Perfall (1879–1966), German forestry and landowner
- Erich von Perfall (1882–1961), Sohn von Karl, painter in Düsseldorf
- Magdalena von Perfall (1883–1940), State Actress, ∞ Josef Achmann
- Manuela von Perfall (1952–2018), Writer

== Literature ==
- Otto Hupp: Münchener Kalender 1925. Buch u. Kunstdruckerei AG, München / Regensburg 1925.
- Genealogisches Handbuch des Adels, Adelslexikon Band X, Band 119 der Gesamtreihe, C. A. Starke Verlag, Limburg (Lahn) 1999, ISSN 0435-2408.
