= Schondorf (Verwaltungsgemeinschaft) =

Schondorf am Ammersee
- Verwaltungsgemeinschaft
- Location of Schondorf am Ammersee within Landsberg district
- Interactive map of Schondorf am Ammersee
- Location within Germany Location within Bavaria
- Coordinates: 48°03′11″N 11°05′28″E
- Country: Germany
- State: Bavaria
- Admin. region: Upper Bavaria
- District: Landsberg

Area
  - Total: 21.03 km^{2} (8.12 sq mi)

Population (2025-12-31)
  - Total: 7,541
  - Density: 358.6/km^{2} (928.7/sq mi)
- Time zone: UTC+01:00 (CET)
  - Summer (DST): UTC+02:00 (CEST)
- Vehicle registration: LL
- Website: www.schondorf-ammersee.de

Schondorf am Ammersee (until 31 March 2009 officially: Schondorf a.Ammersee) is a Verwaltungsgemeinschaft ("collective municipality") in the Upper Bavarian district of Landsberg am Lech, Germany. It was created on 1 May 1978 by regulation by the government of Upper Bavaria.

Its members are the municipalities Eching am Ammersee, Greifenberg and Schondorf. The seat of the administrative community is Schondorf am Ammersee.
