= Maisach (Amper) =

River in Germany

Coordinates: 48.2528°N 11.4139°E

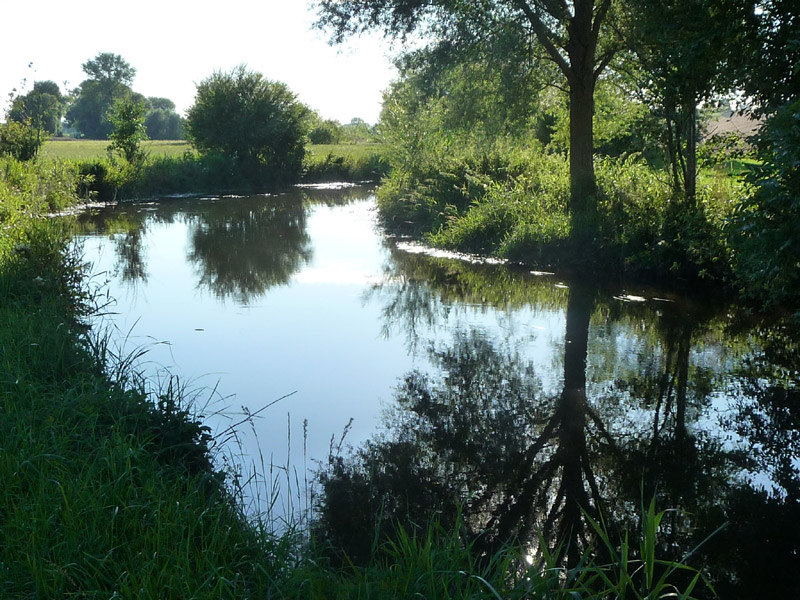
- The Maisach at the municipality Maisach

Location
- Country: Germany
- State: Bavaria

Physical characteristics
- Mouth
  - location: Amper
- Length: 37.3 km (23.2 mi)
- Basin size: 212 km^{2} (82 sq mi)

Basin features
- Progression: Amper→ Isar→ Danube→ Black Sea

The Maisach (German pronunciation: [ˈmaɪzax]) is a river of Bavaria, Germany. It is a left tributary of the Amper near Dachau.

== See also ==
- List of rivers of Bavaria
