= Johannes Gaitanides =

Johannes Gaitanides (1909 in Dresden – 1988 in Schondorf) was a German writer and journalist.

== Biography ==
Gaitanides was born as a son of a Greek father and a German mother. He studied German literature, history and literature at the Ludwig-Maximilians-Universität München. He finished his studies in 1936 with a dissertation (Dr. phil.).

His activities during the Second World War are unclear and have differing accounts. He himself stated that he continued his work reporting and publishing for news stations and the Historical Commission of the Bavarian Academy of Sciences, even that he had immigrated to Greece temporarily for political reasons. However, other accounts claim that he had cooperated during the war as a war correspondent for the government, and as a special Waffen-SS contact.

In his 1940 published work Neues Griechenland ("New Greece") Gaitanides wrote: "[…] in Greece there is no Jewish question, just as in Turkish times Jews held a significant position; their danger is further characterized by their low international status as second-class." In the Soviet Occupation Zone, the book was put on the list of proscribed literature in 1946.

After World War II, Gaitanides henceforth called Johannes (instead of the common shorthand form Hans, that the author had used until then), began writing as a freelance journalist for several newspapers and as a political commentator for the Bavarian Radio and television. In the 1970s, he was a senior editor at Donaukurier in Ingolstadt, a newspaper of central Bavaria.

His numerous publication on Greece, which he toured regularly through his life, were some of his most significant works. As the works of Jacques Lacarrière for French-speaking audiences shaped the image of Greece, Gaitanides' works did the same for the German-speaking public and led to major tourism and interest. His book Greece without columns: representing the history of Greece in modern times, is regarded as a prominent work. His works have been translated into many languages (English, Dutch, etc.).

In 1964, Gaitanides was awarded the Theodor Wolff Prize, named after the Jewish journalist Theodor Wolff (1868–1943) who had to flee National Socialist Germany in 1933. Gaitanides died in 1988 in his hometown Schondorf am Ammersee.

== Quotes ==
"Die griechische Mahlzeit ist nicht Selbstzweck, sie ist vielmehr Vorwand und Anlass und Initialzündung der Geselligkeit, und sie glückt um so mehr, je gelungener der Anlass".

("The Greek meal is not an end in itself, rather it is a pretext and occasion and initial spark of sociability, which succeed more so, depending on the meal's success").

== Works ==
=== Broadcasts on BR ===
- "Art and Criticism: Why not rent pictures? John Gaitanides to alleviate the Künstlernot", March 20, 1950
- "Wednesday Comment", August 16, 1950
- "Books from Greece", August 22, 1950

=== Books ===
- Attempt at a physiognomic analysis of style (dissertation on the poet Georg Rodolf Weckherlin), Munich, 1936
- Oclla - The girl with the Petrified Eyes - A History of the Indians, Frankfurt 1948 Eds.
- Europe: Lucifer among cultures: An Essay, 1956
- The last bridge: splendor and misery of the United Nations, 1958
- The future of Communism, Paul List (publisher) Munich 1963
- Passion Europe - Variations on an almost conservative theme
- A Word on the Impotence of German Literature contributions in Education for Democracy in West Germany, edited by Norbert Mills, Walter steel. New York 1961

==== Books about Greece ====
Gaitanides often travelled to Greece and wrote many books about it. Griechenland ohne Säulen (Greece without columns) is a book about modern Greece and was quite successful. In 1964, he received the Theodor Wolff Award.

- New Greece, Berlin 1940
- Greeks: Hatches and portholes, Berlin, 1943. Dealing with peoples Vol 2
- Greece without columns, Munich edition 1955, ISBN 3-471-77656-7. Munich 1978, ISBN 3-471-77615-X.
- The Archipelago of Greece. Goldmann, Munich 1962, second edition Munich 1982, ISBN 3-442-06901-7. third edition: Frederking and Thaler, Munich 2004, ISBN 3-89405-227-9
- ”Chapter on Greece”, in Woanders lebt man anders. Ohne Hg.- Praesentverlag Heinz Peter, Gütersloh 1962
- ”The mainland”. Greaves Guide 1965
- ”Greek Islands”. Greaves Guide, 1973, translated by Maria Pelikan
- Aegean Trio: Crete, Rhodes, Cyprus, 1974
- Dream rides through the Aegean Sea. License issue (among Koch's publisher); Vienna; Munich; Zurich; Innsbruck 1977
- Greek Greek too: Mediterranean essays. Molden, Munich 1982, ISBN 3-88919-001-4.
- Crete - Rhodes - Cyprus. Aegean Trio (with Susanne I. Worm). Fischer-Taschenbuch-Verlag, Frankfurt am Main 1983, ISBN 3-596-23062-4.
- From Greek kitchens (with Doris Christidis). Munich, Vienna, Zurich 1986

=== Magazines ===
- Hellenika. Journal for German-Greek cultural and economic cooperation, edited by Gaitanides 1964
- Cyprus (with Gustav Faber and Kostas Montis). Merian book, 1970
