= Hohenpeißenberg =

- Municipality
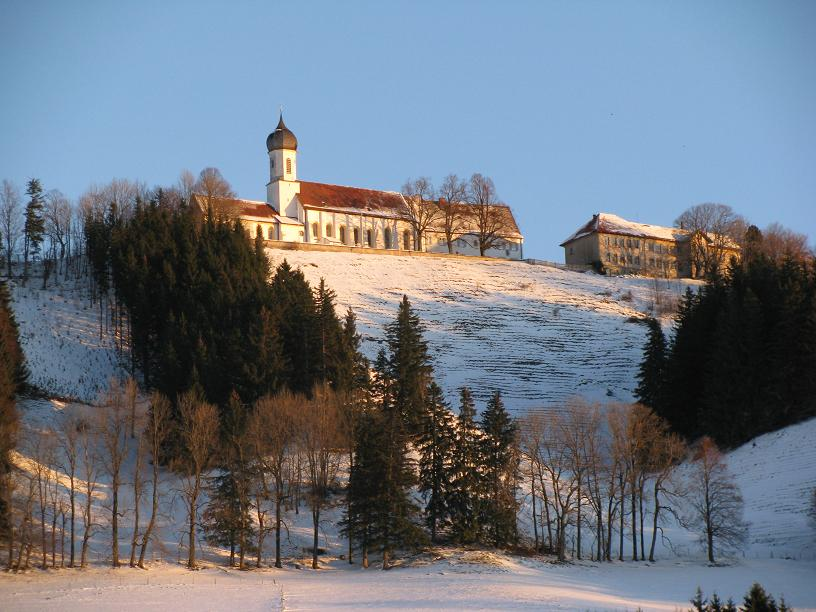
- Pilgrimage Church of the Assumption of the Virgin Mary in winter

- Coat of arms

- Location of Hohenpeißenberg within Weilheim-Schongau district
- Interactive map of Hohenpeißenberg
- Location within Germany Location within Bavaria
- Coordinates: 47°48′N 11°0′E
- Country: Germany
- State: Bavaria
- Admin. region: Upper Bavaria
- District: Weilheim-Schongau

Government
  - Mayor (2020–26): Thomas Dorsch (CSU)

Area
  - Total: 20.44 km^{2} (7.89 sq mi)
- Elevation: 780 m (2,560 ft)

Population (2025-12-31)
  - Total: 3,845
  - Density: 188.1/km^{2} (487.2/sq mi)
- Time zone: UTC+01:00 (CET)
  - Summer (DST): UTC+02:00 (CEST)
- Postal codes: 82383
- Dialling codes: 08805
- Vehicle registration: WM
- Website: www.hohenpeissenberg.de

Hohenpeißenberg is a municipality in the Weilheim-Schongau district, in Bavaria, Germany. Hohenpeißenberg is situated in the Bavarian Oberland, in the Alpine Foreland.

It exists only as a local subdistrict.

== Geography ==
The highest point is the peak of the 988 meter high Hoher Peißenberg (high Peißenberg).

Because of the panoramic view from it, it is also called the Bavarian Mount Parnassus or the Bavarian Mount Rigi. It is regarded as the most beautiful panoramic mountain of Bavaria and it is also a favoured destination for excursions.

Formerly it was referred to as the Mount Doctus, due to the scholarliness of the meteorological research taking place at its peak.

The largest part of the areas population is found on the south side of the mountain, a smaller part on the west side (districts of Hetten and Buchschorn); a yet smaller part of the population is found on the north and the east side.

The region is situated on the side of the bank that is opposite to the left of the bank of the Ammer. The Ammer flows south of the local center in a small ravine called the "Schnalz".

=== Climate ===
The climate is oceanic (Köppen: Cfb; Trewartha: Dclo), affected by altitude and proximity to the Alps (especially in precipitation). Registering data continuously since 1781, the Hohenpeißenberg Observatory is the oldest in the world located on a mountain. The station located in the alpine foothills integrates the German Meteorological Network and served for the program Global Atmospheric Watch program (GAW).

The Hohenpeißenberg weather station has recorded the following extreme values:

- Its highest temperature ever recorded there was 33.8 °C (92.8 °F) on 29 July 1947.
- Its lowest temperature ever recorded there was −29.1 °C (−20.4 °F) on 11 February 1929.
- Its largest yearly precipitation was 1,572.4 mm (61.91 in) in the year 1939.
- Its least annual precipitation was 779.8 mm (30.70 in) in the year 1943.
- The longest annual sunshine was 2,266.4 hours in 2022.
- The shortest annual sunshine was 1,548.2 hours in 1987.

Climate data for Hohenpeißenberg (MOHp), elevation: 986 m, (1991–2020 normals, extremes 1781–present)
Month	Jan	Feb	Mar	Apr	May	Jun	Jul	Aug	Sep	Oct	Nov	Dec	Year
Record high °C (°F)	18.1 (64.6)	19.7 (67.5)	23.6 (74.5)	29.4 (84.9)	29.0 (84.2)	31.8 (89.2)	33.8 (92.8)	33.1 (91.6)	29.6 (85.3)	26.9 (80.4)	22.3 (72.1)	18.6 (65.5)	33.8 (92.8)
Mean maximum °C (°F)	11.8 (53.2)	13.0 (55.4)	17.0 (62.6)	21.4 (70.5)	24.6 (76.3)	27.3 (81.1)	28.6 (83.5)	28.0 (82.4)	23.8 (74.8)	21.1 (70.0)	17.4 (63.3)	12.6 (54.7)	29.6 (85.3)
Mean daily maximum °C (°F)	2.4 (36.3)	3.0 (37.4)	6.8 (44.2)	11.5 (52.7)	15.5 (59.9)	18.9 (66.0)	20.8 (69.4)	20.6 (69.1)	15.9 (60.6)	11.9 (53.4)	6.8 (44.2)	3.5 (38.3)	11.5 (52.7)
Daily mean °C (°F)	−0.5 (31.1)	−0.1 (31.8)	3.0 (37.4)	7.0 (44.6)	11.1 (52.0)	14.5 (58.1)	16.3 (61.3)	16.4 (61.5)	12.1 (53.8)	8.3 (46.9)	3.6 (38.5)	0.6 (33.1)	7.7 (45.9)
Mean daily minimum °C (°F)	−3.0 (26.6)	−2.8 (27.0)	0.0 (32.0)	3.4 (38.1)	7.3 (45.1)	10.7 (51.3)	12.5 (54.5)	12.7 (54.9)	9.1 (48.4)	5.5 (41.9)	1.0 (33.8)	−1.9 (28.6)	4.5 (40.1)
Mean minimum °C (°F)	−11.2 (11.8)	−10.3 (13.5)	−7.1 (19.2)	−3.6 (25.5)	1.1 (34.0)	4.6 (40.3)	7.4 (45.3)	7.1 (44.8)	3.3 (37.9)	−1.5 (29.3)	−5.9 (21.4)	−10.1 (13.8)	−13.7 (7.3)
Record low °C (°F)	−26.3 (−15.3)	−29.1 (−20.4)	−18.8 (−1.8)	−11.0 (12.2)	−6.6 (20.1)	−1.1 (30.0)	−0.8 (30.6)	0.2 (32.4)	−3.5 (25.7)	−10.8 (12.6)	−14.9 (5.2)	−21.1 (−6.0)	−29.1 (−20.4)
Average precipitation mm (inches)	58.0 (2.28)	52.9 (2.08)	67.5 (2.66)	73.1 (2.88)	135.7 (5.34)	153.7 (6.05)	151.7 (5.97)	161.3 (6.35)	104.9 (4.13)	78.2 (3.08)	67.2 (2.65)	62.6 (2.46)	1,166.8 (45.94)
Average extreme snow depth cm (inches)	29.7 (11.7)	34.7 (13.7)	29.0 (11.4)	12.4 (4.9)	0.6 (0.2)	0 (0)	0 (0)	0 (0)	0.6 (0.2)	6.2 (2.4)	16.3 (6.4)	23.3 (9.2)	45.9 (18.1)
Average precipitation days (≥ 1.0 mm)	14.8	14.0	16.0	14.9	17.4	18.1	17.0	15.4	14.6	14.8	13.8	16.3	187.2
Average relative humidity (%)	79.3	77.6	75.2	70.6	72.9	73.5	72.3	73.5	79.7	80.6	80.6	79.4	76.3
Mean monthly sunshine hours	92.7	105.9	148.0	178.7	198.2	210.9	233.4	223.6	163.4	130.8	95.0	83.9	1,864.4
Source 1: World Meteorological Organization
Source 2: DWD (extremes)

== Local History ==
In 1514 a chapel was built on the Hohen Peißenberg. A carved image of the Mother of God was brought there from the castle chapel in Schongau. The figure soon became renowned as being a figure of mercy and pilgrimage to it began. Because of this, a second church, the Pilgrims church, was added to the chapel. Thus the two churches we know today came to be.

The chapel lies west of the church tower, the pilgrims church lies east. The ensemble lends the peak its unique silhouette.

From 1604 until the secularization in 1803, the augustinian canons regulars in charge of the cloister Rottenbuch also supervised the pilgrimage to the Hohen Peißenberg. The large ceiling fresco by Matthäus Günther inside the chapel of Mercy also depicts the committal of the pilgrimage site to the cloister Rottenbuch.

It was the Augustinian monks who also carried out the first meteorological observations on the site and these have been carried out continuously since 1781, making Hohenpeißenberg Meteorological Observatory the oldest meteorological station in the world. Following the secularization, it was initially the priests and the school teachers who carried on recording and observing meteorological conditions; after World War II the German Meteorological Service took over this duty.

The monks also ran a school on the mountain. The Volksschule was founded by the Augustinian regular Primus Koch (1752-1812) and in April 1802 it first opened its doors to students.

In lieu of the bavarian administrative reform, the community edict gave rise to the local centres as we now know them. Formerly, the district belonged to Peiting. Hohenpeißenberg belonged to the reformation of Munich and to the district of Schongau which in turn is part of the electorate of Bavaria.

The first building section of the former school was built after the monks time there from 1882 until 1883.

=== Mining ===
The discovery of pitch coal as the 1600s gave rise to mining activity in the area, mostly on a small scale. State-owned mining began on May 8, 1837 with the inset of the so-called Hauptstollen (main adit) in the area of Brandach, whereby the initial sinking of the Unterbauschacht (Unterbau shaft) took place from the first of July 1889 onwards. A 3.6-kilometer-long cable car, operating from 1898 to 1928, transported coal from the coal washing plant to the Tiefstollen (deep adit) in Peißenberg.

Old adits exist in the region, the Hauptstollen is open to guided tours several times a year. The air shaft at the Hohenpeißenberg train station was sunk from 1937 to 1939. From mid-October 1960 onwards it was the deepest shaft in Bavaria, measuring a depth of 1150 meters. There was also an air shaft in the district of Klausen. Mining in the Peißenberg basin discontinued first in Peiting (in 1968) and in 1971 in Peißenberg. The closure of the Peißenberg pit also marked the end of mining activities in the area.

Until 1972, the border of the administrative districts Schongau and Weilheims ran through the village. Now Hohenpeißenberg is the local center of the new administrative district of Weilheim-Schongau. In 1978 a large part of the former community of Ammerhöfe was added to the area of Hohenpeißenberg, because of the restructuring of the administrative district of Weilheim-Schongau of April 12, 1976.

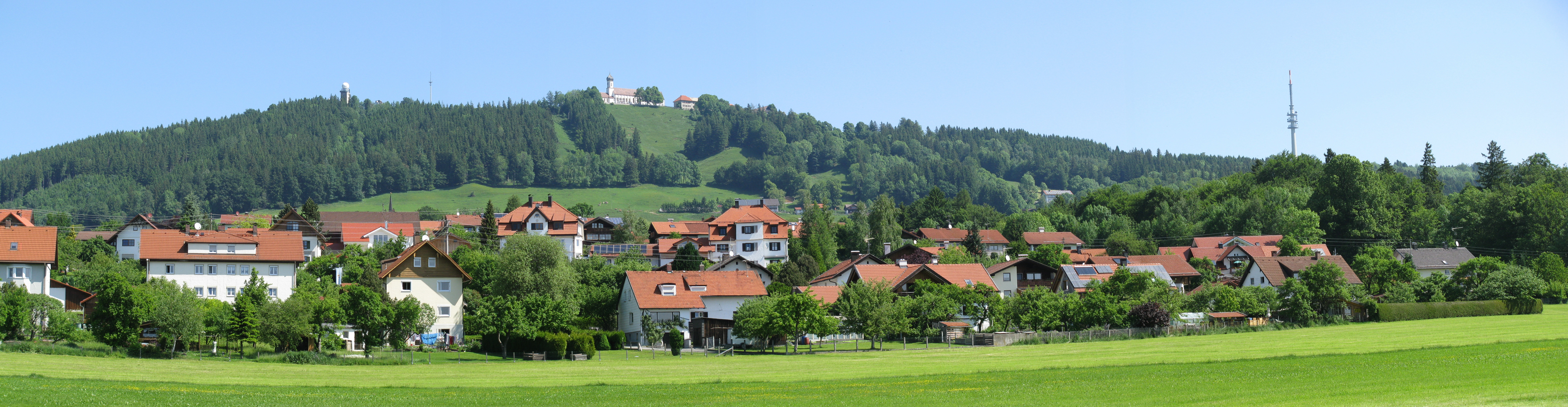
Hohenpeißenberg

== Transport ==
The municipality has a railway station, Hohenpeißenberg, on the Schongau–Peißenberg line.

== Personalities ==
- Matthäus Günther (1705-1788), important painter of the Rococo; he painted the frescoes in the Gnadenkapelle
- Karl Wilhelm Diefenbach (1851-1913), painter and life-reformer
- Adolf Galland (1912-1996), Luftwaffe general and flying ace, imprisoned here (Aug 1945) after May surrender
- Maximilian Nagl (born 1987), motocross rider
