= Gröbenbach =

River in Germany

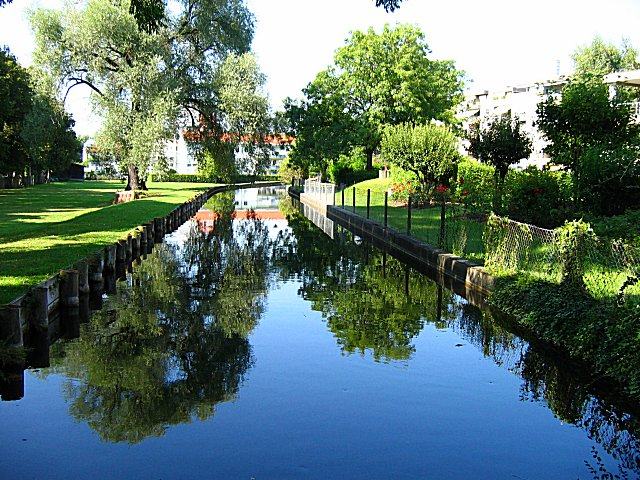
- The Gröbenbach in Dachau

Location
- Country: Germany
- State: Bavaria

Physical characteristics
- Mouth
  - location: Amper
  - coordinates: 48.2599°N 11.4413°E
- Length: 21.7 km (13.5 mi)

Basin features
- Progression: Amper→ Isar→ Danube→ Black Sea

Gröbenbach (German pronunciation: [ˈɡʁøːbn̩bax]) is a river of Bavaria, Germany. It flows into the Amper in Dachau.

== See also ==
- List of rivers of Bavaria
