= Maisach =

- Municipality
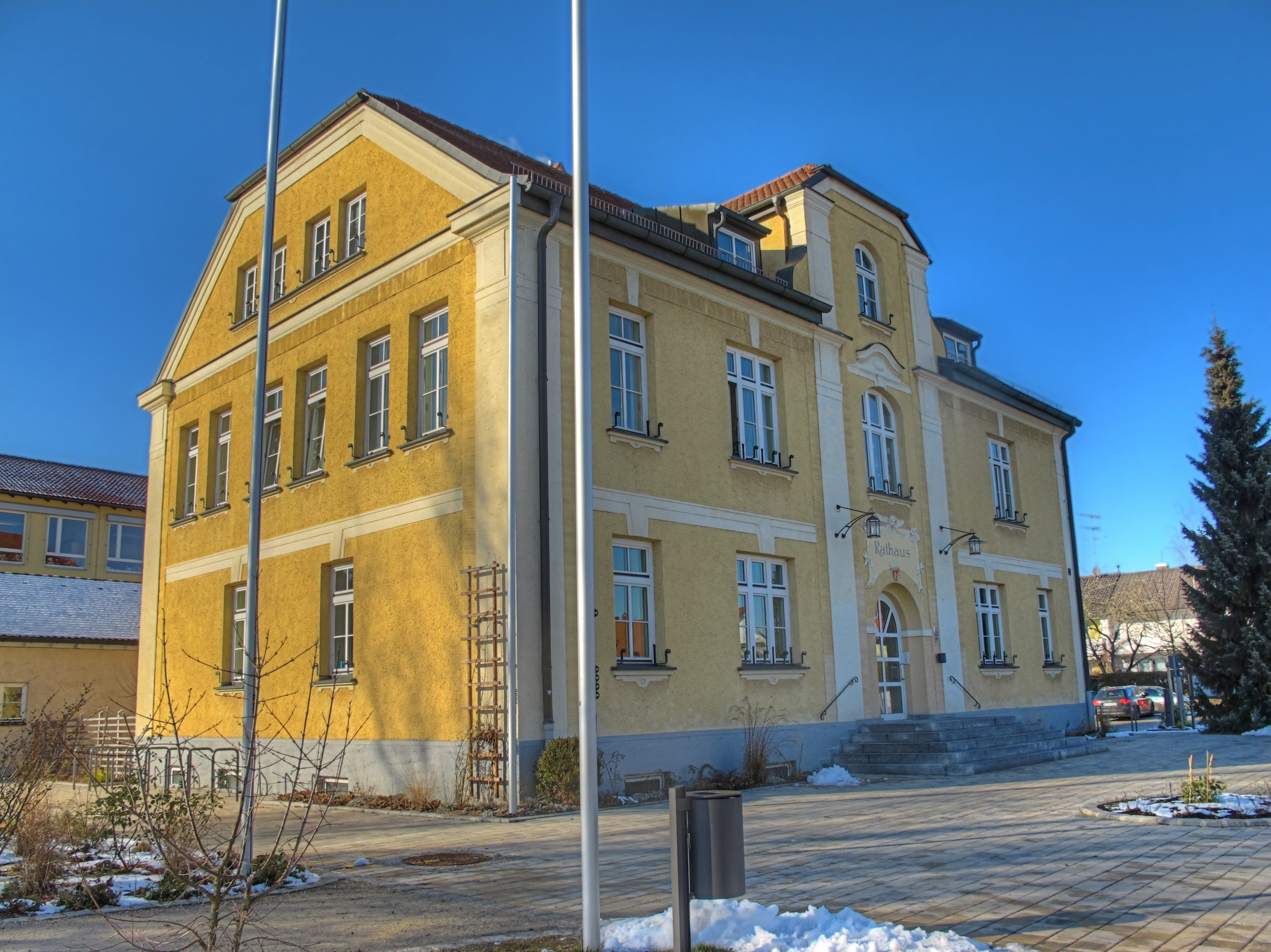
- Town hall

- Coat of arms

- Location of Maisach within Fürstenfeldbruck district
- Interactive map of Maisach
- Location within Germany Location within Bavaria
- Coordinates: 48°13′N 11°16′E
- Country: Germany
- State: Bavaria
- Admin. region: Oberbayern
- District: Fürstenfeldbruck
- Subdivisions: 25 Ortsteile

Government
  - Mayor (2020–26): Hans Seidl (CSU)

Area
  - Total: 53.45 km^{2} (20.64 sq mi)
- Elevation: 514 m (1,686 ft)

Population (2025-12-31)
  - Total: 13,955
  - Density: 261.1/km^{2} (676.2/sq mi)
- Time zone: UTC+01:00 (CET)
  - Summer (DST): UTC+02:00 (CEST)
- Postal codes: 82216
- Dialling codes: 08141 / 08142 / 08135
- Vehicle registration: FFB
- Website: www.maisach.de

Maisach (German pronunciation: [ˈmaɪzax]) is a municipality in the district of Fürstenfeldbruck, in Bavaria, Germany.

== Geography ==
Maisach is the largest municipality in the Fürstenfeldbruck district. It is situated 4 km (2.5 mi) north of Fürstenfeldbruck, and 25 km (16 mi) northwest of Munich. It is served by an S-Bahn station on the towards Mammendorf, which lies south of the town center.

The tallest building in the town belongs to the eponymously named local brewery and sports an aircraft warning beacon.

The community Maisach lies on the river Maisach.

== History ==
The first documentary record of Maisach comes from the year 806. For the other districts excepting Gernlinden there are also records coming from the second half of the 8th and first half of the 9th century. Gernlinden is first recorded in 1436.

In 1818 the community was established. The settlement Gernlinden was built after the first world war. The current organisation of the districts was carried out in 1978.

== Districts ==
(Districts in italics are primary districts or previously individual communities)

- Maisach (5.193 residents)
  - Anzhofen (10 residents)
  - Diepoltshofen (71 residents)
- Gernlinden (4.419 residents)
  - Gernlinden-Ost (147 residents)
- Überacker (902 residents)
  - Fußberg (14 residents)
  - Fußbergmoos (23 residents)
  - Loderhof (13 residents)
  - Pöcklhof (12 residents)
  - Thal (22 residents)
- Rottbach (268 residents)
  - Deisenhofen (50 residents)
  - Kuchenried (6 residents)
  - Oberlappach (114 residents)
  - Prack (25 residents)
  - Unterlappach (17 residents)
  - Weiherhaus (13 residents)
  - Zötzelhofen (19 residents)
- Germerswang (783 residents)
  - Frauenberg (123 residents)
  - Stefansberg (124 residents)
- Malching (310 residents)
  - Obermalching (19 residents)
  - Galgen (22 residents)

== Politics ==
The municipal council (Gemeinderat) of Maisach has 24 members:

	CSU	SPD	Freie Wähler Maisach	Die Grünen	Einigkeit Gernlinden	Bürgerforum Gesamtgemeinde Maisach	Total
2002	10	6	3	1	3	1	24 Seats
2008	10	3	6	3	2	0	24 Seats
2014	10	4	5	3	2	0	24 Seats

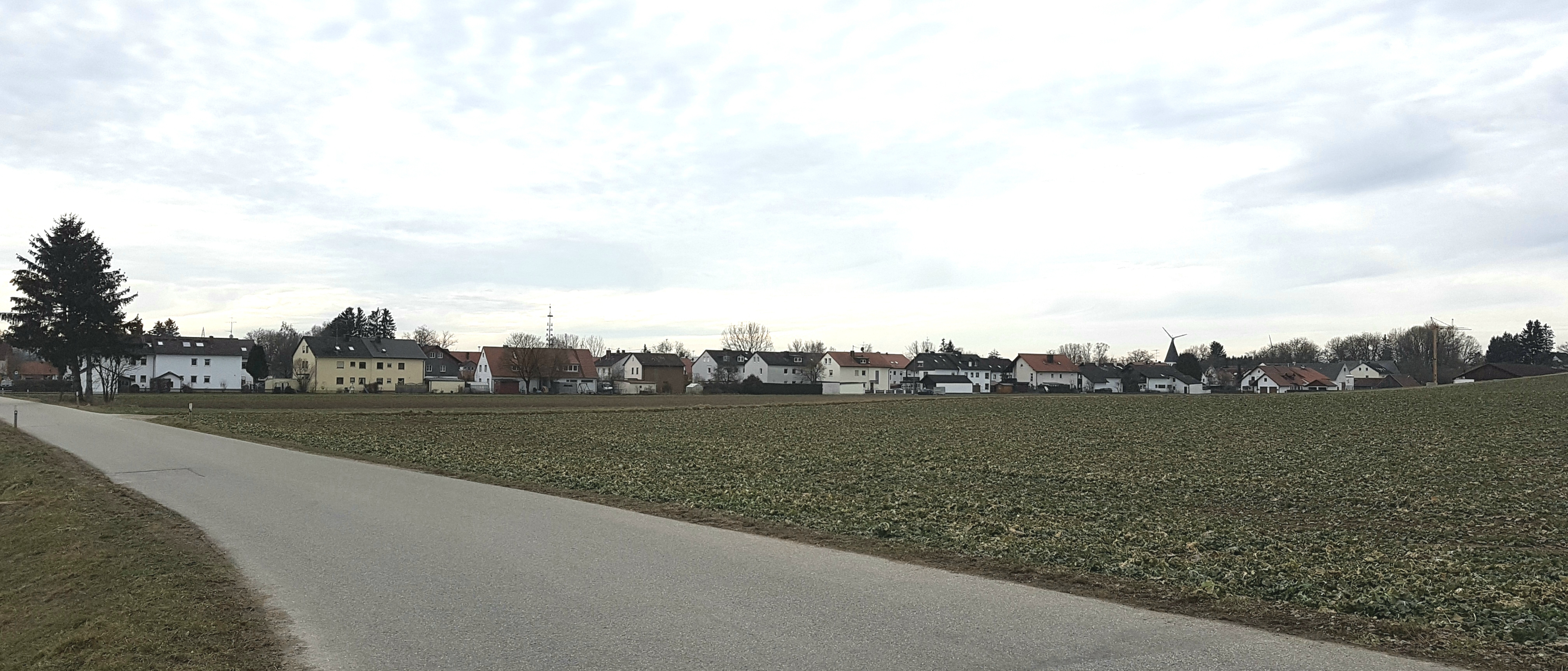
Germerswang from the northeast

(Status: 2014)

The mayor is Hans Seidl (CSU).
