= Kohlbach (Ammer) =

River in Germany

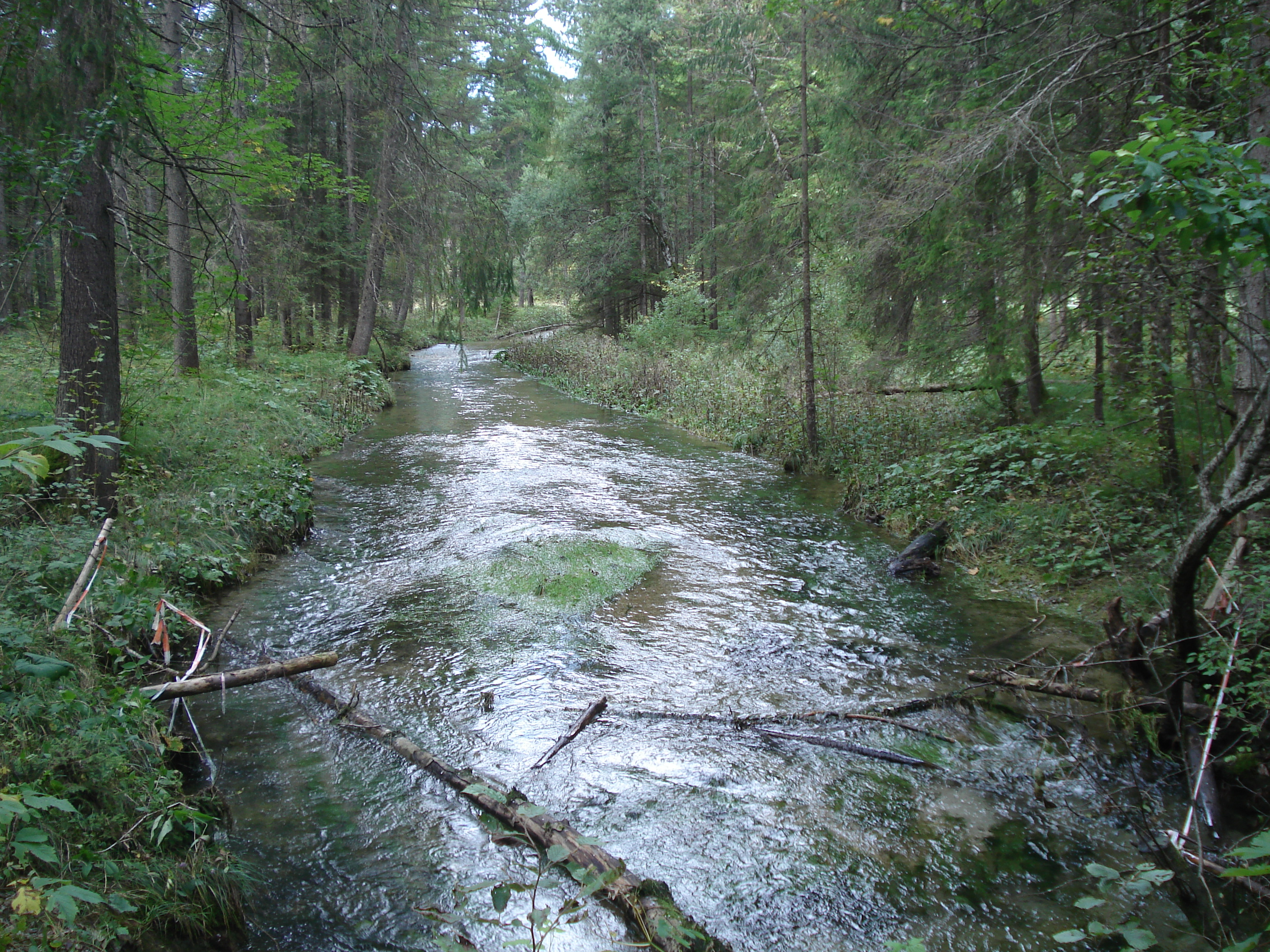
- The Kohlbach south of Oberammergau

Location
- Country: Germany
- States: Bavaria

Physical characteristics
- Mouth
  - location: Ammer
  - coordinates: 47.5715°N 11.0571°E

Basin features
- Progression: Amper→ Isar→ Danube→ Black Sea

Kohlbach is a river in Bavaria, Germany. It is a left tributary of the Ammer south of Oberammergau.

== See also ==
- List of rivers of Bavaria
