= Hohenpeißenberg Meteorological Observatory =

Coordinates: 47.8014°N 11.0097°E

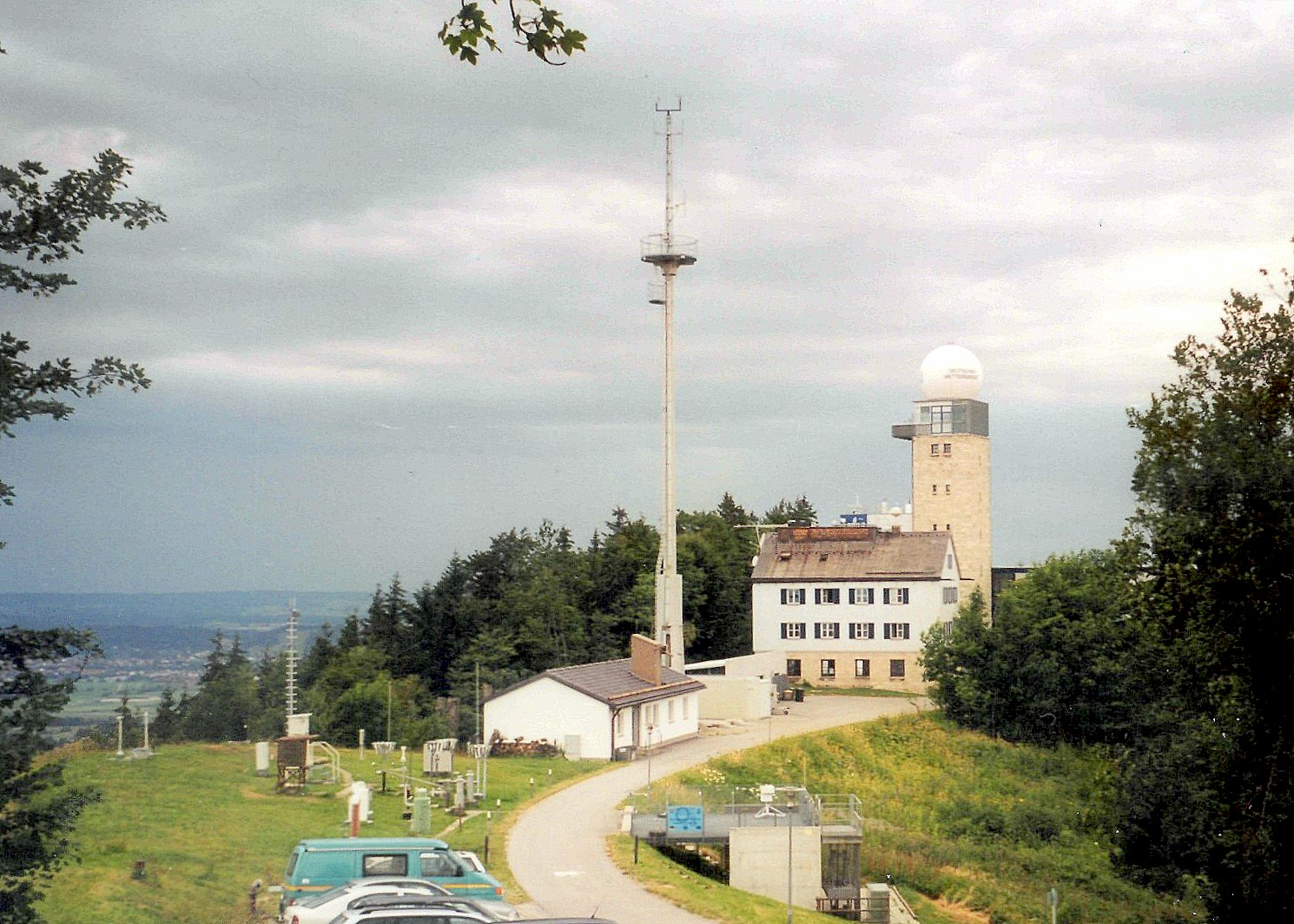
Observatory Hohenpeißenberg

The Meteorological Observatory Hohenpeißenberg is the oldest mountain weather station in the world. It is located in the municipality of Hohenpeißenberg, about 60 kilometres southwest of Munich, Germany, and at 977 metres above sea level. Meteorological data is collected on the site continuously since 1781. The measurement series ranks among the longest ever, and was never impacted by urban heat island effects, a problem encountered by the comparably long records from the Basel and Prague observatories. As of today, it is operated by Deutscher Wetterdienst, and takes part in the Global Atmosphere Watch programme.

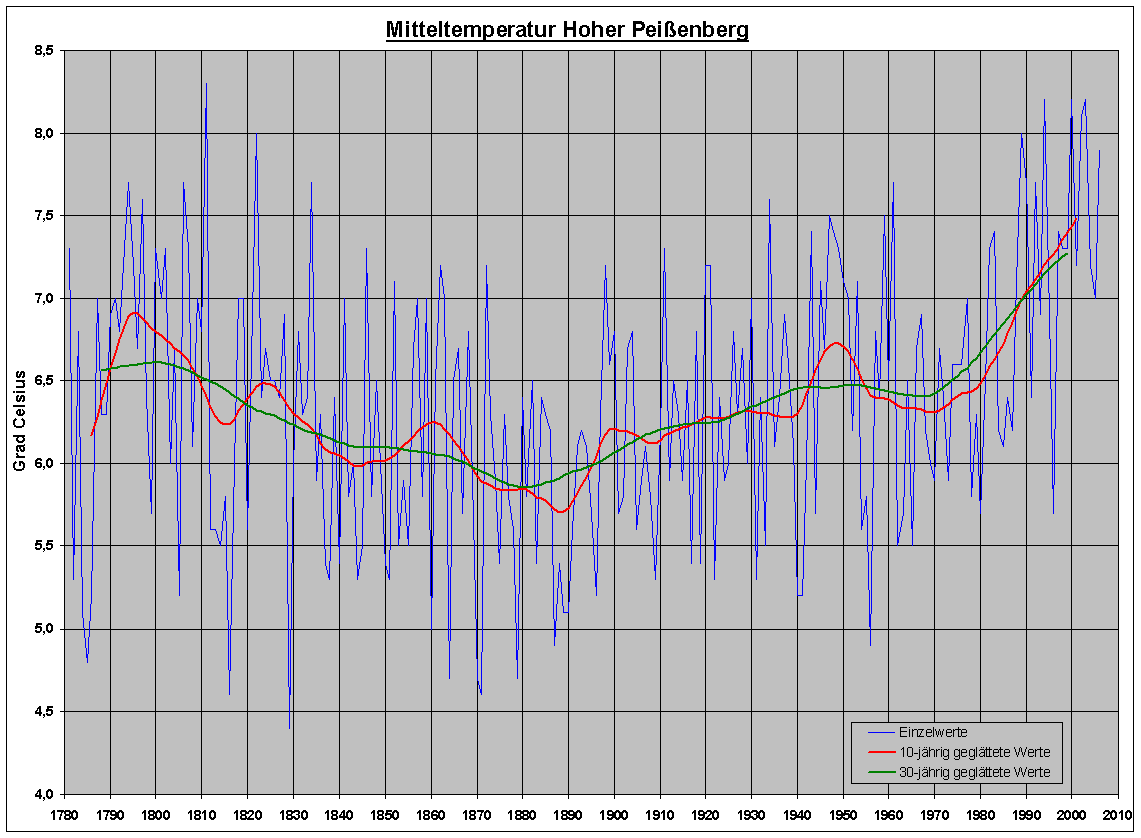
Temperature record 1781-2006

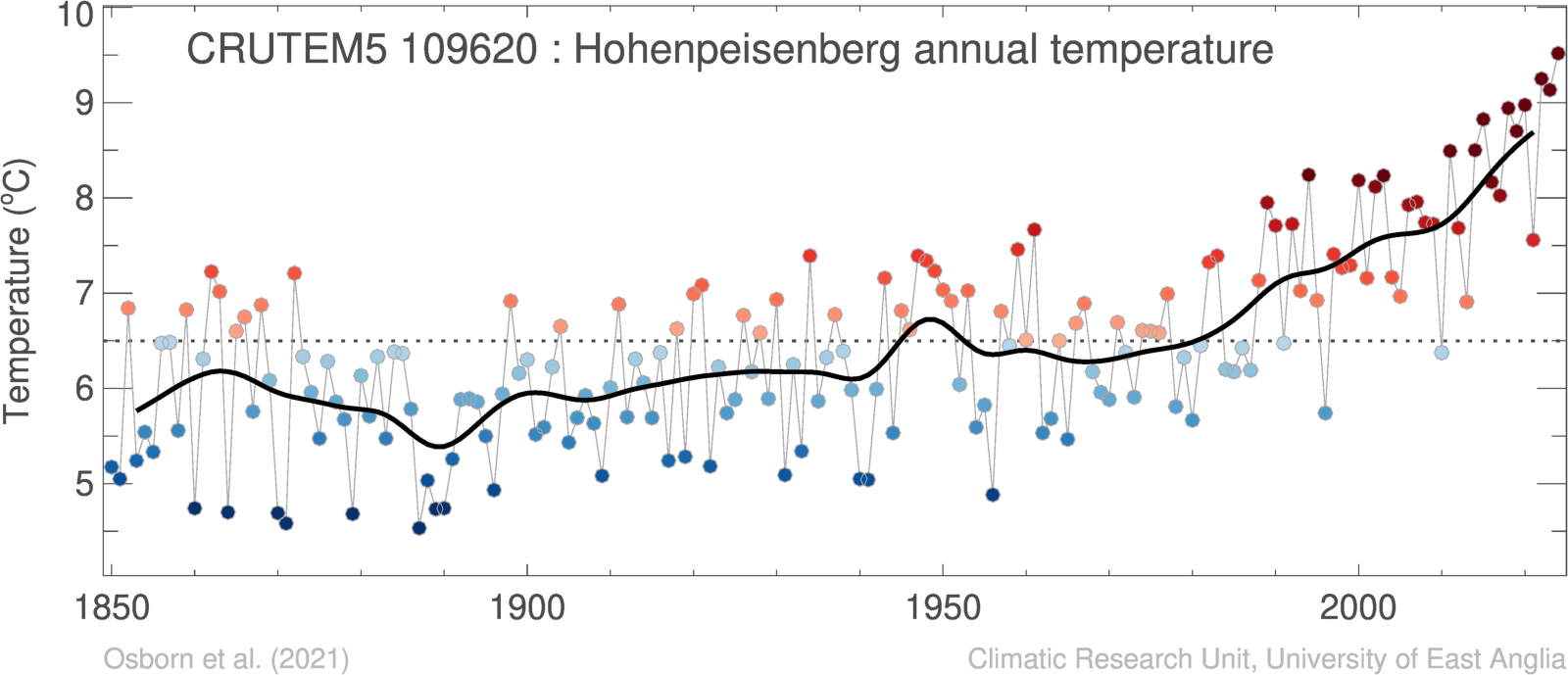
Updated temperature record 1850-2024 from the CRUTEM database (Annual average temperature recorded at Hohenpeissenberg meteorological observatory for the period 1850-2024. Coloured dots are the individual yearly values connected by thin grey line, while the thick black line shows the 20-year smoothed changes.)

== Literature ==
- Peter Winkler: Hohenpeißenberg 1781-2006 - das älteste Bergobservatorium der Welt. Deutscher Wetterdienst, Offenbach am Main 2006, ISBN 3-88148-415-9.
- Deutscher Wetterdienst (Hrsg.): 200 Jahre meteorologische Beobachtungen auf dem Hohenpeißenberg 1781-1980. Offenbach am Main 1981, ISBN 3-88148-184-2.
