= Eching am Ammersee =

Eching a.Ammersee
- Municipality
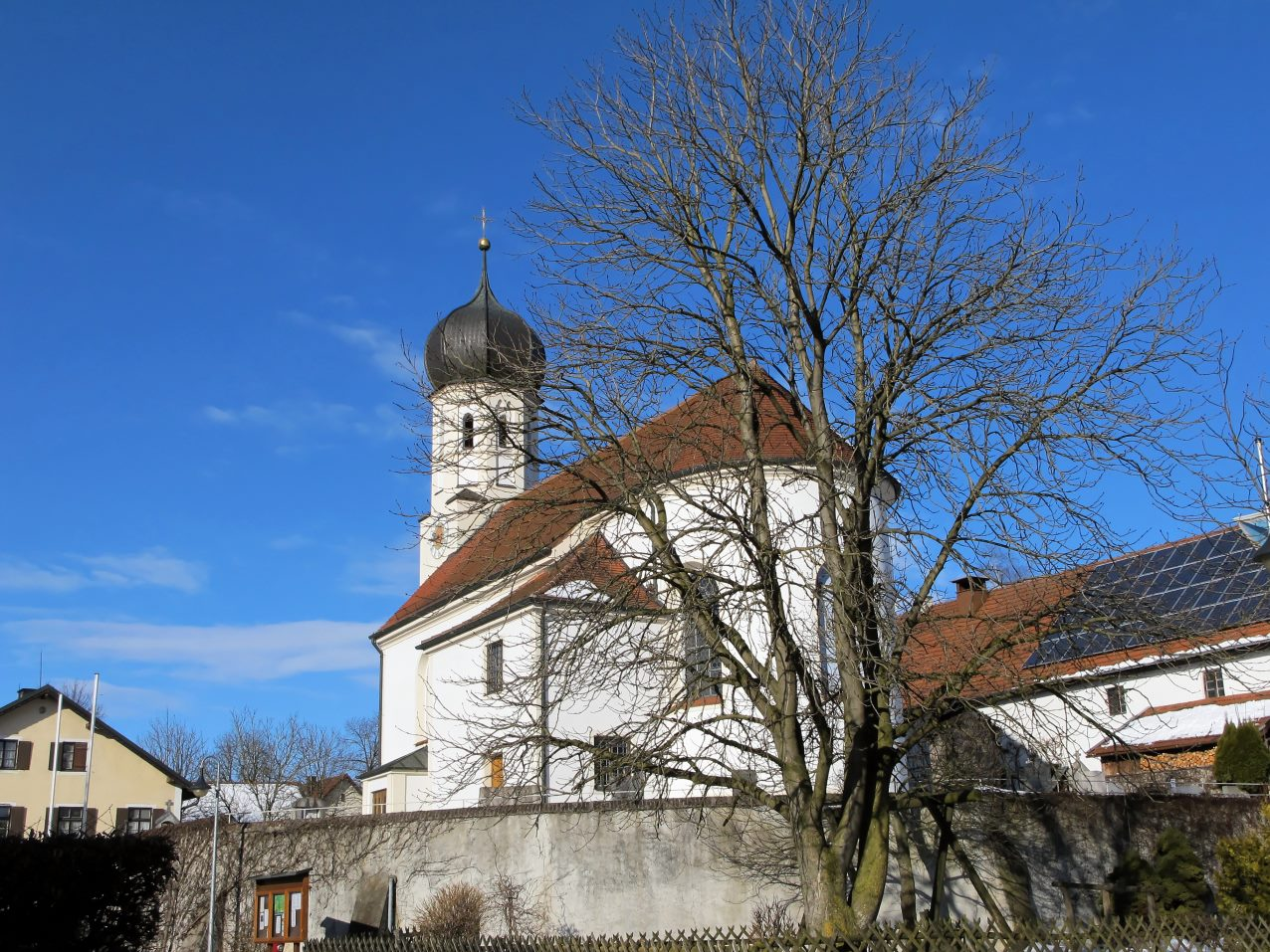
- Church of Saints Peter and Paul

- Coat of arms

- Location of Eching a.Ammersee within Landsberg district
- Interactive map of Eching a.Ammersee
- Location within Germany Location within Bavaria
- Coordinates: 48°08′N 11°12′E
- Country: Germany
- State: Bavaria
- Admin. region: Upper Bavaria
- District: Landsberg
- Municipal assoc.: Schondorf
- Subdivisions: 2 Quarters

Government
  - Mayor (2020–26): Siegfried Luge (CSU)

Area
  - Total: 6.24 km^{2} (2.41 sq mi)
- Elevation: 541 m (1,775 ft)

Population (2025-12-31)
  - Total: 1,634
  - Density: 262/km^{2} (678/sq mi)
- Time zone: UTC+01:00 (CET)
  - Summer (DST): UTC+02:00 (CEST)
- Postal codes: 82279
- Dialling codes: 08143
- Vehicle registration: LL
- Website: https://www.eching-ammersee.de/

Eching am Ammersee (German pronunciation: [ˈɛçɪŋ ʔam ˈʔamɐˌzeː], lit. 'Eching on the Ammersee') is a municipality in the district of Landsberg in Bavaria in Germany. It has a size of 6.15 km^{2}.

Situated at the northern shore of the Ammersee at an elevation of 541m, it borders the Naturschutzgebiet "Ampermoos" and the wooded recreation area "Weingarten".

== Districts ==
- Eching
- Gießübl

== History ==
Eching belonged to the Electorate of Bavaria and was part of the Hofmark Greifenberg of the Freiherrn von Perfall. Its current form was established in the Gemeindeedikt of 1818.

== Population ==
Date	Population
December 1, 1840	241
December 1, 1871	265
December 1, 1900	308
June 16, 1925	378
May 17, 1939	458
September 13, 1950	761
June 6, 1961	607
May 27, 1970	749
May 25, 1987	1293
May 9, 2011	1654

Date	Population
December 31, 2007	1625
December 31, 2008	1609
December 31, 2009	1638
December 31, 2010	1654
December 31, 2011	1681
December 31, 2012	1657
December 31, 2013	1661
December 31, 2014	1660
December 31, 2015	1681
December 31, 2016	1703

== Politics ==
=== Mayor ===
Mayor since May 1996 is Siegfried Luge (CSU) (born 1943). The last election was on 15 March 2020.

=== Town Council ===
For the first time after 36 years CSU and the local grouping "Bürgerblock" had separate lists in the election. The "Bürgerblock" won 9 seats, CSU won 3.

The distribution of seats in municipal council.
Year	CSU	CSU/Bürgerblock	Bürgerblock	Menschen für Menschen	Turnout
2014	3		9		67.5%
2008		10		2	67.3%
2002		11		1	70.3%
1996		11		1	72.7%
1990		12			77.3%
1984		12			80.0%
1978		12			74.5%
