= Amper =

River in Germany

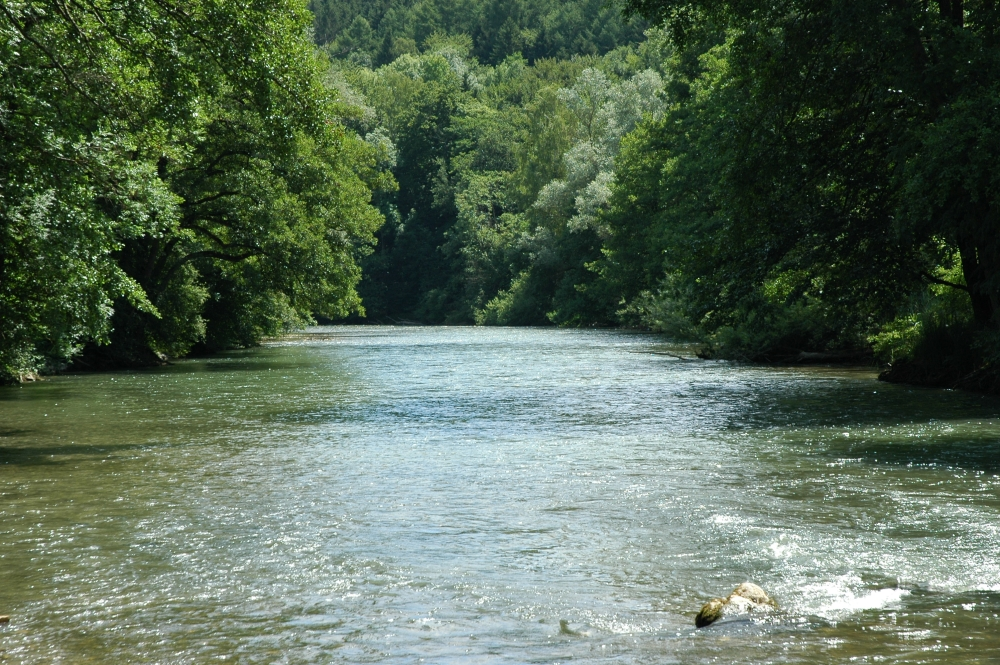
- The Amper south of Fürstenfeldbruck

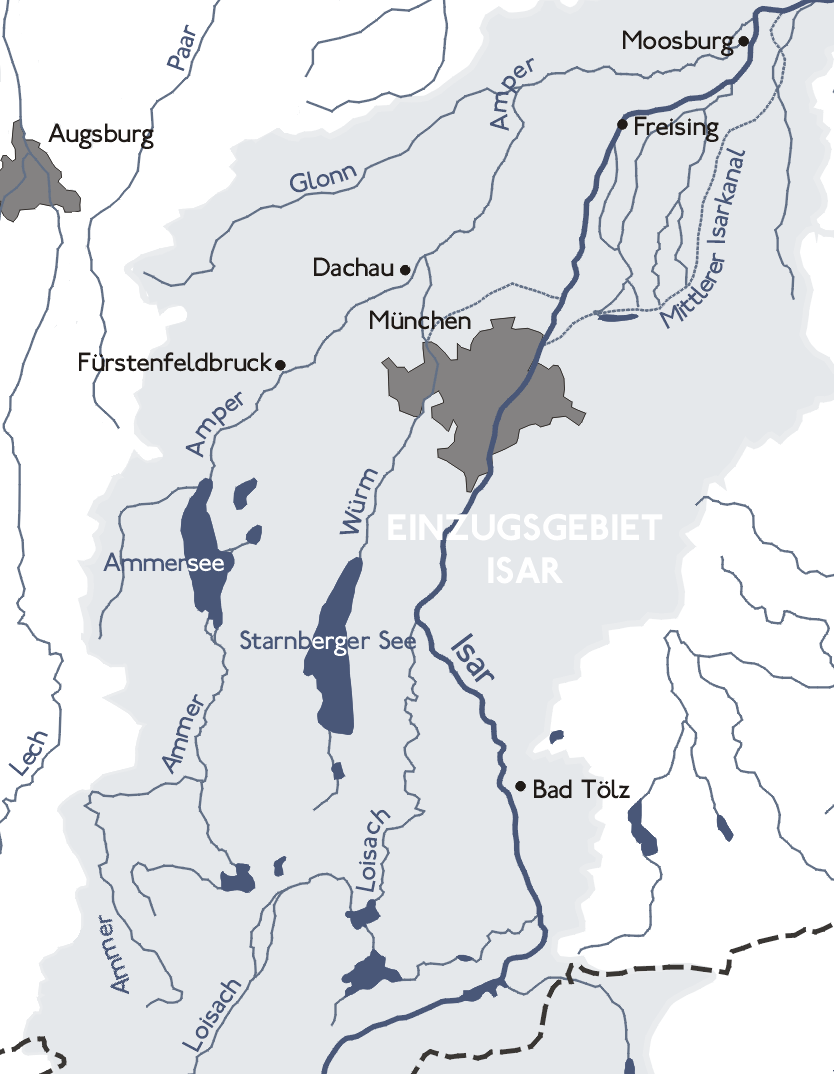
- The Ammer/Amper system within the Isar basin

Location
- Country: Germany
- State: Bavaria

Physical characteristics
- Source
  - location: Northern Limestone Alps
- Mouth
  - location: Isar
  - coordinates: 48°30′1″N 11°57′24″E
- Length: 190 km (120 mi)
- Basin size: 3,248 km^{2} (1,254 sq mi)
- Discharge
  - average: ±45 m^{3}/s (1,600 cu ft/s)

Basin features
- Progression: Isar→ Danube→ Black Sea

The Amper (German pronunciation: [ˈampɐ]), called the Ammer ([ˈamɐ]) upstream of the Ammersee, through which it runs, is the largest tributary of the Isar in southern Bavaria, Germany. It flows generally north-eastward, reaching the Isar in Moosburg, about 185 kilometres (115 mi) from its source in the Ammergau Alps, with a flow of 45 m^{3}/s. Including its tributary, Linder, it is 209.5 km (130.2 mi) long. Major tributaries are the Glonn, which rises near Augsburg; the Würm, which is the outflow of Lake Starnberg; and the Maisach.

== Etymology ==
The term "Amper" can be derived from the Indo-European root * ombh-," which denotes water or a watercourse. The Celtic name "ambra" was adopted by the Romans and has been attested as genitive ambre and locative amber since the 3rd century. According to another interpretation, Amper is related to the Breton and therefore Celtic word ampart. Accordingly, the river name would stand for the terms skillful, agile and strong.

In 1243 the Ammersee was first referred to as the Amirsee and it was not until the 14th century that a distinction was made between the Ammer as a tributary to the Ammersee and the Amper.

== Geography ==
The Ammer, and thus also the Amper, drains part of the Ammergau Mountains to the northeast to the Isar and thus to the Danube. Over a distance of around 100 km, the Amper crosses four natural areas: the steep old and young moraines, the flat gravel plain and the Danube-Isar hill country.

The Ammer/Amper river system overcomes a total of 430 metres (1,410 ft) in altitude. The Ammer loses almost 200 meters in the 20-kilometer-long gorge south of Peißenberg.

=== Sources ===
The source area of the Ammer is located in the Ammergau Alps at the exit of the Graswang valley between Graswang and Ettal. Some of the water flows down from a raised bog, and some of the various spring pots in the valley floor are fed by the water of the Linder that emerges here on the border between Tyrol and Bavaria near the Ammersattel.

The streams are fed by the Großer Ammerquellen, located on both sides of the river bed of the Linder, flow into the mostly dry bed of the Linder and, at some times of the year, together with the Linder, which is still flowing here, form the Große Ammer. The Kleine Ammer springs, located on the north side of the Graswang Valley, feed the Kleine Ammer, which flows into the Große Ammer between Ettal and Oberammergau and forms the Ammer with it.

=== Ammer ===
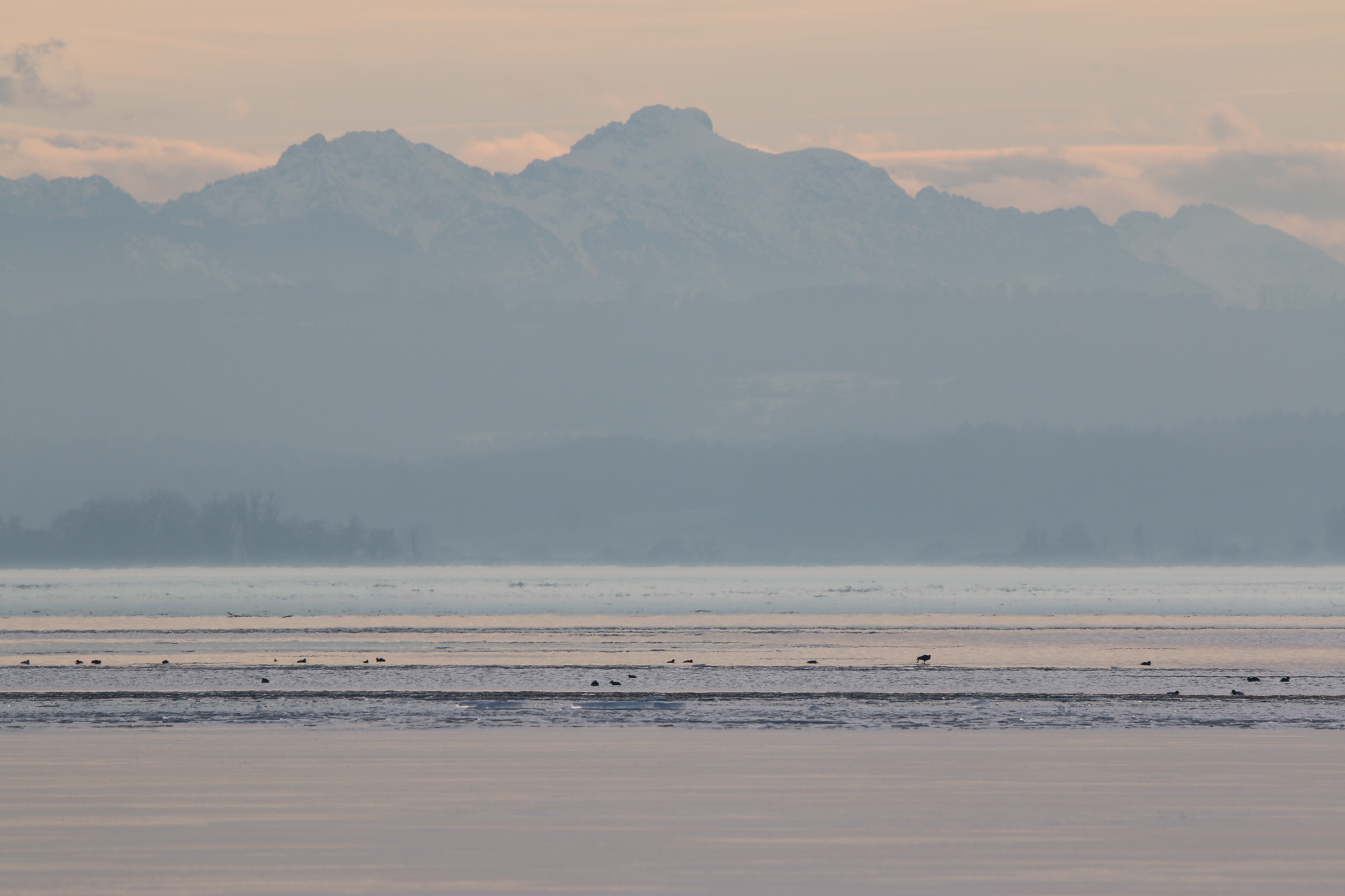
The Ammersee with the Alps in the background

North of Unterammergau, the river leaves the Bavarian Alps after about 15 kilometers and flows through the Ammer-Loisach hill country to the north. In this young moraine landscape, created from the deposits of the Isar-Loisach glacier during the Würm glacial period, the Ammer cuts up to 80 meters deep into the moraine and the molasse underneath and forms the Ammerschlucht, also called Ammerleite. To the south of Hohenpeißenberg, the Ammer Gorge bends to the east. At Peißenberg, the river leaves the gorge and turns back north. It flows through a long, wide valley until it flows into the Ammersee east of Dießen am Ammersee. A little before that, the Alte Ammer branches off to the left, which after a short run is absorbed by the longer but usually less watery Rott, which also flows into the Ammersee.

=== Amper ===
After exiting the Ammersee near Eching am Ammersee, the Amper valley first cuts through a terminal moraine landscape of the Isar-Loisach glacier from the Würm glacial period near Grafrath and then flows through the Munich gravel plain from Fürstenfeldbruck. To the northeast of Dachau it comes into the area of the tertiary Danube-Isar hill country and finally flows into the Isar at Moosburg. Southwest of Moosburg, most of its water (30 m^{3}/s) is withdrawn from the Amper and fed to the Isar through a canal south of Moosburg. This water is used to generate energy in the Uppenborn works on the Mittlere-Isar canal through another connecting canal. Immediately before it flows into the Isar, another part of the water is branched off and flows as the Klötzlmühlbach north of the Isar to Landshut.

== Tributaries ==
The first tributary of the Ammer is shortly after the connection of the outflows from the Große Ammerquellen with the Linder is the approximately 7 kilometers long near Kohlbach. Its longest tributary in the Ammergau Alps is the Halbammer, which flows into it from the left at Saulgrub. In the area of the Ammer Gorge, the Ammer only takes in smaller streams. After exiting the gorge, the 19-kilometer-long Eyach and the 43-kilometer long Ach, which forms the outflow of the Staffelsee and is the longest tributary of the Ammer before it flows into the Ammersee, flow into it from the right in quick succession near Oberhausen. Larger tributaries in the further course to the Ammersee are the Angerbach near Weilheim in Upper Bavaria, the Grünbach near Wielenbach and the Kinschbach near Pähl, all of which flow into them from the right.

Larger tributaries of the Ammersee are the Rott near Dießen am Ammersee and the Kienbach and Fischbach in Herrsching am Ammersee.

Shortly after leaving the Ammersee, the Amper near Eching am Ammersee takes up the 36-kilometer-long Windach from the left. Other major tributaries are the Maisach (36 km long, flows from the left at Günding), the Würm, which forms the outflow of Lake Starnberg (40 km long, flows from the right at Hebertshausen) and the Glonn, which is 50 kilometers long the longest Amper tributary is (flows from the left at Allershausen). Shortly before the confluence of the Amper into the Isar, the approximately 14-kilometer-long Mühlbach, which is derived from the Moosach, flows into it at Wang as its last tributary from the right.

== Nature and environmental protection ==
Since the middle of the 19th century, the natural course of the Ammer and Amper has been significantly changed by flood protection and the construction of power plants – with far-reaching consequences for the native flora and fauna. The continuity of the flowing water is often disturbed by weirs. This makes the migration and distribution of fish upstream and downstream more difficult or even impossible. The dike in some areas also meant an interference with the ecological balance. The alluvial forests were shielded from the natural water inflow by the dikes, so that the alluvial forest is only in remnants. To preserve the original river landscape, at least in some areas, several nature reserves, such as the Amperauen nature reserve with Leitenwälder between Fürstenfeldbruck and Schöngeising, have been designated.

The Ammer estuary and the Ampermoos nature reserve north of the Ammersee are among the seven internationally significant wetlands in Bavaria.

== Business ==
=== Shipping ===
The Amper is only navigable in part and has no significance for inland navigation.

From 1880 to 1939 a regular steamboat connection operated between Stegen am Ammersee and Grafrath, which was mainly used by excursionists from Munich. These took the train to Grafrath and walked about 1.5 km from the train station to the landing stage. There they boarded the boat to Stegen, where they could transfer to Ammersee steamships.

After the opening of the railway line between Munich and Herrsching, the number of passengers on the water sank so much that the costs of keeping the section navigable made operation uneconomical; the ship connection from Grafrath to Stegen had to be stopped. The beginning of the Second World War brought the end to shipping on the Amper. The Maria Therese was the first steamship that opened the Amper shipping line between Inning and Grafrath on 10 May 1880. It was popularly known as the "Mooskuh" because the entire route between Grafrath and the Ammersee ran through the Ampermoos and its beep resembled the call of the bittern.

In the past, wood was rafted on the river, mainly from the Ammer Mountains. This is indicated by names such as Trifthof for an industrial park in Weilheim. This Trifthof was built in 1611. To bring the tree trunks further across the Ammersee to Dachau, they were connected to form drift rafts.

== Power generation ==
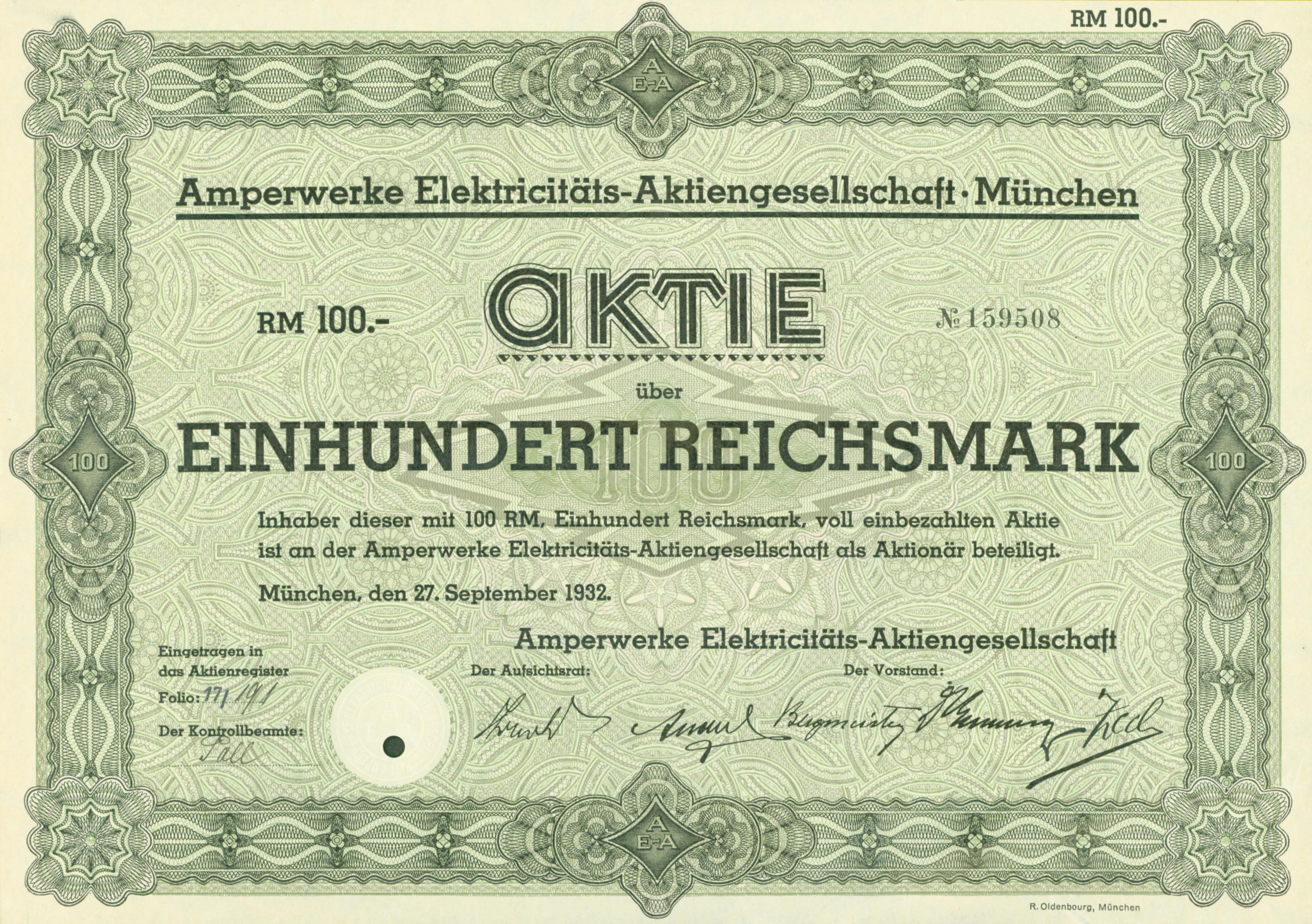
Share of the Amperwerke Elektricitäts-AG, issued 27 September 1932

Two hydropower plants are of historical importance. As early as 1891/92, the first hydropower plant in Bavaria was built by Oskar von Miller in Schöngeising. The world's first rail power station for single-phase alternating current, the Kammerl power station, went into operation a few years later around 1898 west of Saulgrub in the Ammertal valley. It served to supply the 23-kilometer-long line between Murnau and Oberammergau belonging to the Lokalbahn Aktien-Gesellschaft, which started the first scheduled electric train service in 1905. The Amperwerke was founded in 1908 to systematically use the hydropower on the Amper. A number of other run-of-river power plants along the river system with regional economic importance emerged in this way, mostly up to the First World War. These are works, among others. in Unterbruck near Fürstenfeldbruck (1892), Olching, Dachau, Hebertshausen, Volkmannsdorf near Allershausen or Kranzberg (1911). Hydropower plants require a consistently high water level so that energy generation does not come to a standstill in months with little rainfall. This was ensured by building a few smaller canals, weirs and a storage reservoir near Fürstenfeldbruck. At Zolling, Amper supplies the Zolling power plant with cooling water via a canal. The Haag hydropower plant is located on the same canal.

== Tourism ==
In addition to a number of interesting cities along the Ammer and Amper rivers such as Weilheim, Fürstenfeldbruck, Dachau and Moosburg, the Ammersee in particular is of touristic importance. Along the Ammer, the Schleier waterfalls south of Bad Bayersoien and the Echelsbacher Bridge are the most important sights.

Long stretches of the river are lined with cycle paths that allow tours from the Alps to the mouth of the Amper at Moosburg an der Isar. Driving on the Ammer and Amper with canoes or similarly manoeuvrable boats is possible over almost the entire route, but not allowed all year round. Boating on the Ammer between 1 December and 30 April is only allowed with a discharge of at least 6 cubic meters / second. During the bird breeding season (1 March to 15 July), driving on the Amper from Stegen to Grafrath and between Schöngeising and Fürstenfeldbruck is prohibited. The city of Fürstenfeldbruck has designated a number of official bathing opportunities along the Amper.

== See also ==
- List of rivers of Germany

== Literature ==
- Franz X. Bogner: Ammer and Amper from the air: portrait of a river landscape. Bayerland-Verlag, Dachau 2009, ISBN 978-3-89251-402-2
- Norbert Göttler: To Ammer and Amper – A cultural and historical hike. 3. Edition. Bayerland-Verlag, Dachau 2004, ISBN 3-89251-060-1
- Martin Siepmann, Brigitta Siepmann: Werdenfelser Land and Upper Ammertal. Bayerland-Verlag, Dachau 1995, ISBN 3-89251-213-2
