= Greifenberg =

- Municipality
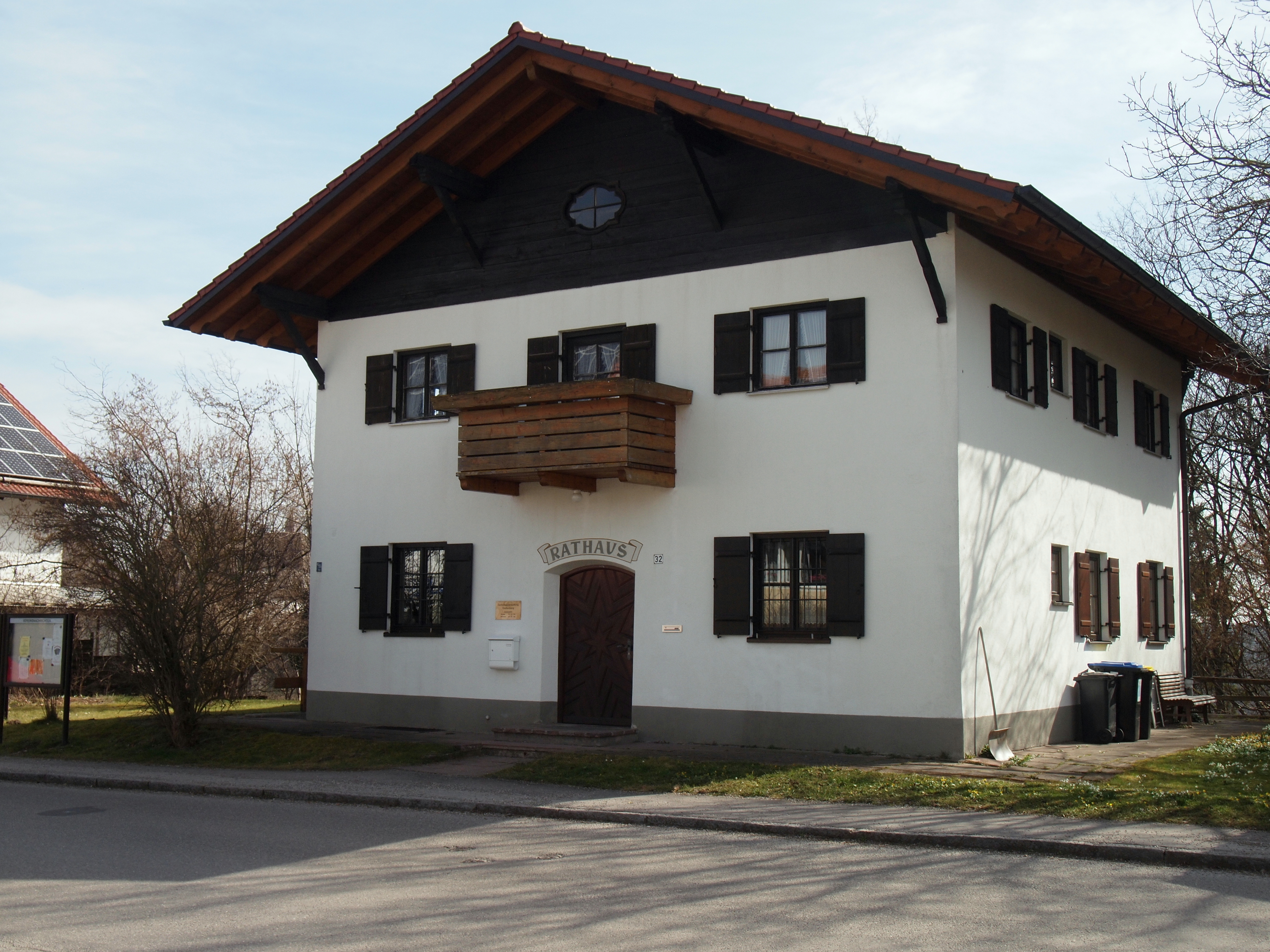
- Town hall

- Coat of arms

- Location of Greifenberg within Landsberg district
- Interactive map of Greifenberg
- Location within Germany Location within Bavaria
- Coordinates: 48°04′N 11°05′E
- Country: Germany
- State: Bavaria
- Admin. region: Upper Bavaria
- District: Landsberg
- Municipal assoc.: Schondorf
- Subdivisions: 4 Quarters

Government
  - Mayor (2020–26): Patricia Müller

Area
  - Total: 8.2 km^{2} (3.2 sq mi)
- Elevation: 580 m (1,900 ft)

Population (2025-12-31)
  - Total: 2,137
  - Density: 260/km^{2} (670/sq mi)
- Time zone: UTC+01:00 (CET)
  - Summer (DST): UTC+02:00 (CEST)
- Postal codes: 86926
- Dialling codes: 08192
- Vehicle registration: LL
- Website: www.greifenberg.info

Greifenberg (German pronunciation: [ˈɡʁaɪfn̩ˌbɛʁk]) is a municipality in the district of Landsberg in Bavaria in Germany.
