= Puchheim station =

Railway station in Bavaria, Germany

Puchheim
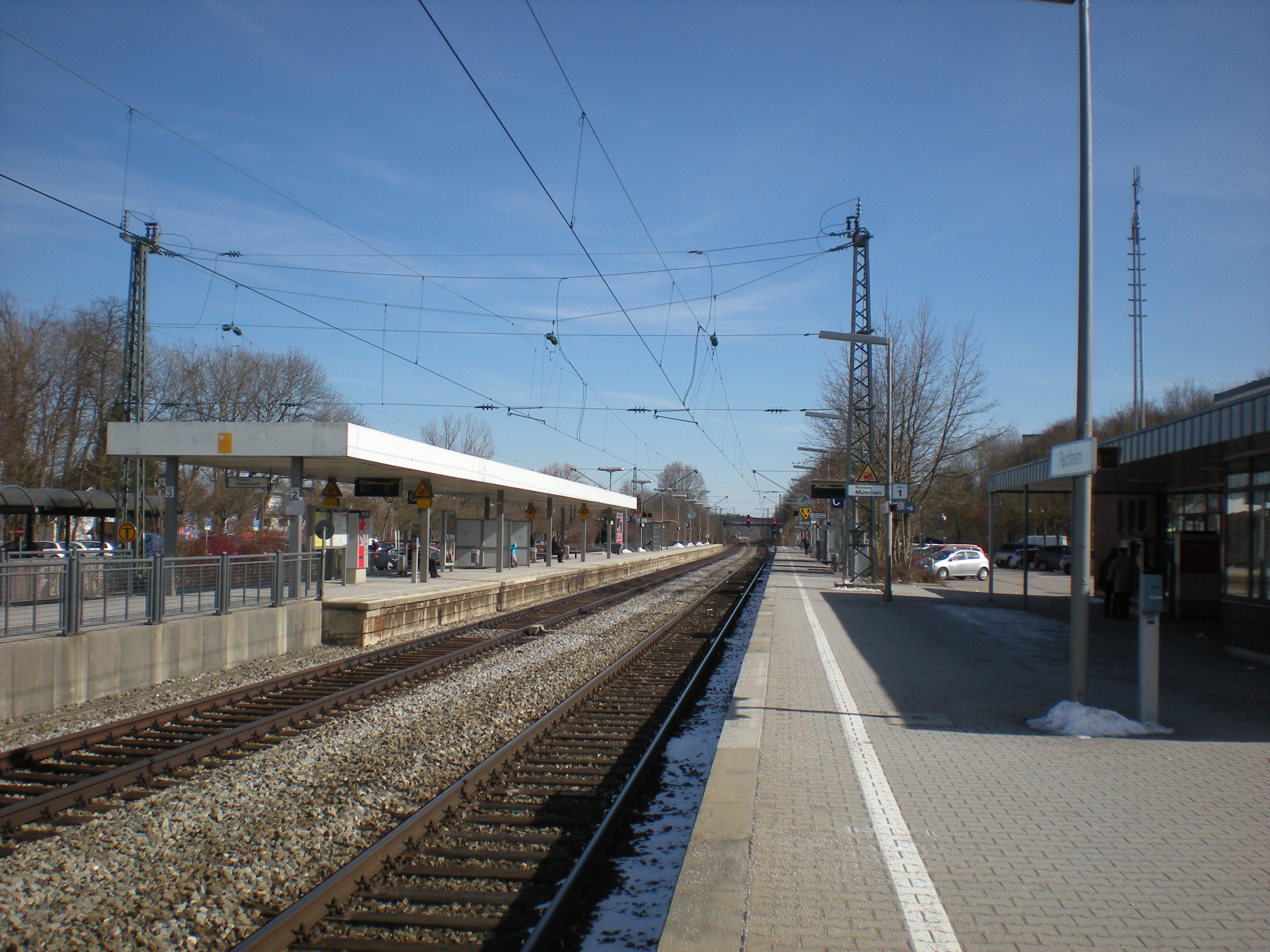
- 2013

General information
- Location: Lochhauser Straße; 82178 Puchheim; Bavaria; Germany
- Coordinates: 48.1720°N 11.3528°E
- System: Bf
- Owner: Deutsche Bahn
- Operator: DB Netz; DB Station&Service
- Lines: Munich–Buchloe railway (KBS 970)
- Platforms: 1 island platform 1 side platform
- Tracks: 3
- Train operators: S-Bahn München
- Connections: 830, 832, 853, 854, 855, 862, 8300, X80

Construction
- Parking: yes
- Cycle facilities: yes
- Accessible: partly

Other information
- Station code: 5054
- DS100 code: MPM
- IBNR: 8004893
- Category: 4
- Fare zone: : 1 and 2
- Website: www.bahnhof.de

History
- Opened: 1 May 1896; 130 years ago

Services
Preceding station	Munich S-Bahn	Following station
Eichenau (Oberbay) towards Geltendorf	S4	Munich-Aubing towards Ebersberg
Eichenau (Oberbay) towards Geltendorf	S20 Limited service	Munich-Aubing towards Höllriegelskreuth
Location
- Location within Bavaria Location within Germany Location within Europe

Puchheim station (German: Bahnhof Puchheim) is a railway station in the municipality of Puchheim, located in the Fürstenfeldbruck district in Bavaria, Germany.
