= Munich-Aubing station =

Railway station in Bavaria, Germany

München Aubing
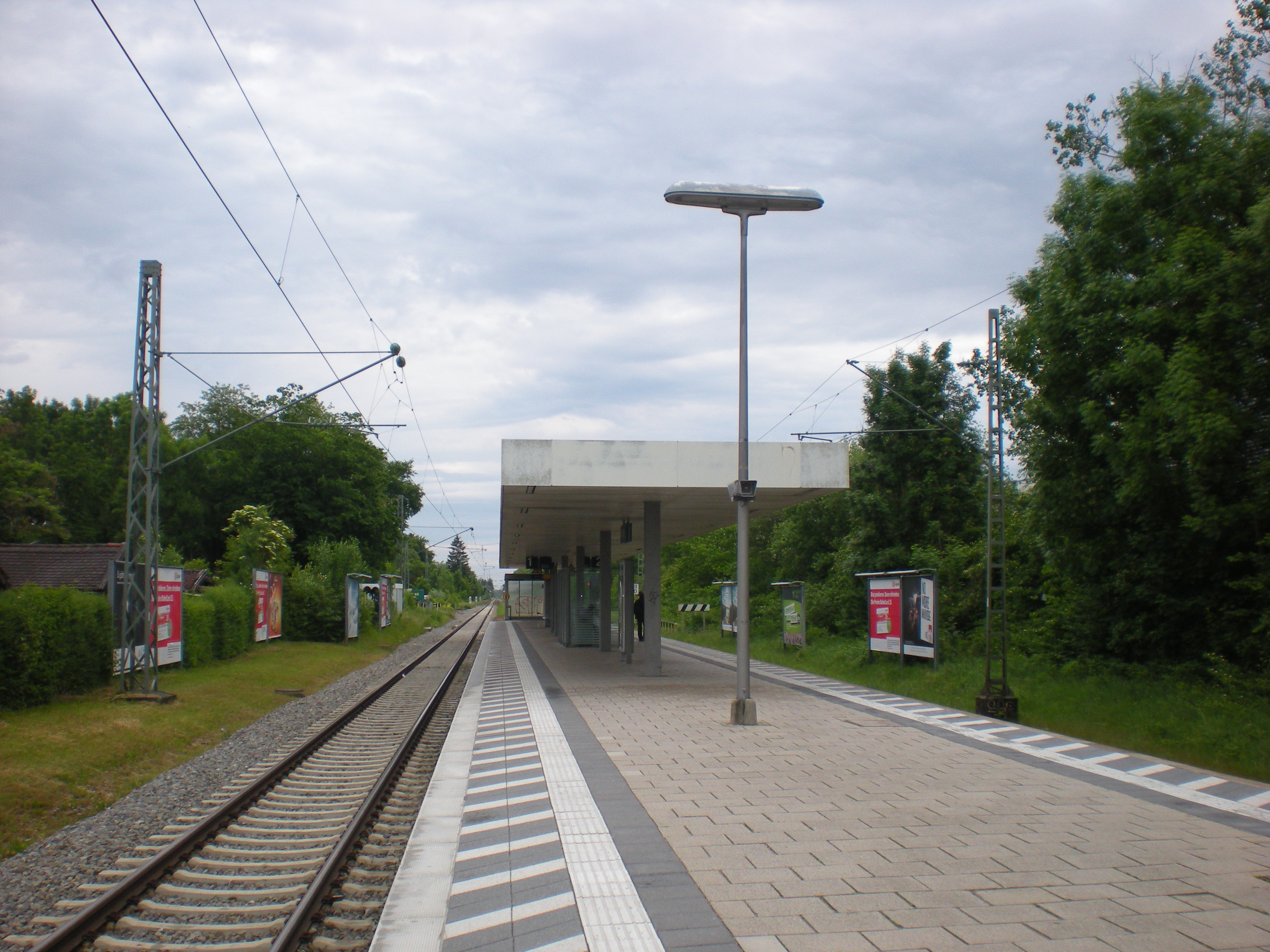
- 2012

General information
- Location: Georg-Böhmer-Straße 9; 81124 Munich; Aubing-Lochhausen-Langwied; Bavaria; Germany
- Coordinates: 48.1560°N 11.4128°E
- Owner: DB Netz
- Operator: DB Station&Service
- Lines: Munich–Buchloe railway (KBS 970/999.4)
- Distance: 11,117km
- Tracks: 2
- Train operators: S-Bahn München
- Connections: 143, 157

Other information
- Station code: 4247
- DS100 code: MMAU
- IBNR: 8004141
- Category: 5
- Fare zone: : M and 1
- Website: www.bahnhof.de

Services
Preceding station	Munich S-Bahn	Following station
Puchheim towards Geltendorf	S4	Leienfelsstraße towards Ebersberg
Puchheim towards Geltendorf	S20 Limited service	Leienfelsstraße towards Höllriegelskreuth
Location
- Location within Bavaria

Munich-Aubing station is a railway station in the Aubing-Lochhausen-Langwied borough of Munich, Germany.
