= Munich gravel plain =

Pleistocene outwash plain in Bavaria, Germany

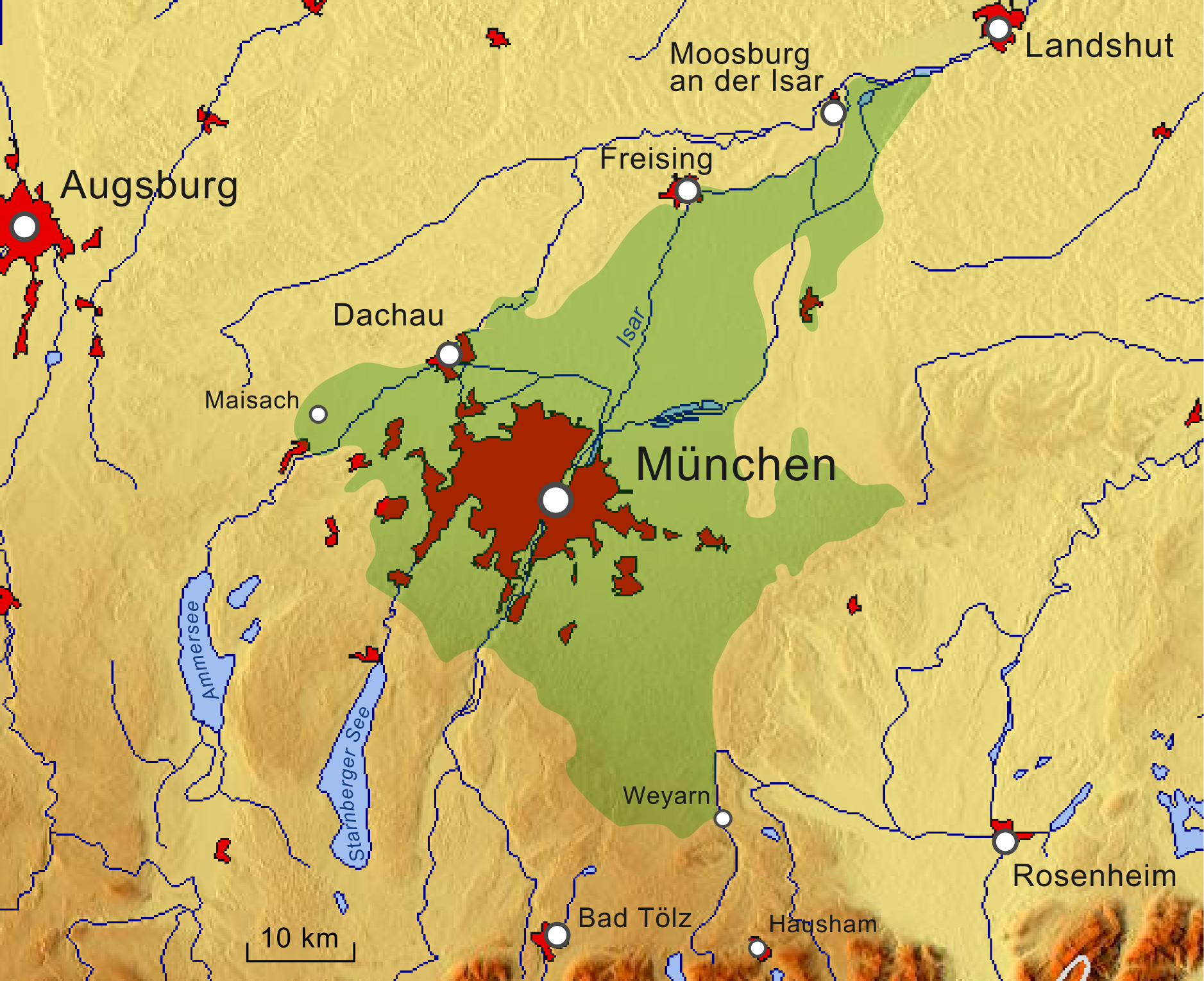
Relief map showing the Munich gravel plain (green)

The Munich gravel plain (German: Münchner Schotterebene) is an outwash plain in Upper Bavaria, Germany, formed during Late Pleistocene glacial periods. Covering a triangular area of around 1,500 square kilometers (580 mi^{2}), it comprises sandur terraces and the floodplain of the Isar, on which the city of Munich and most of its surroundings are built. These most recent deposits overlie the Neogene Molasse basin of the Alpine Foreland, which by contrast comprises fine-grained fluviatile and lacustrine facies. Its sand and gravel have long been extracted for construction, leaving many former pits that are now lakes.

== Location ==
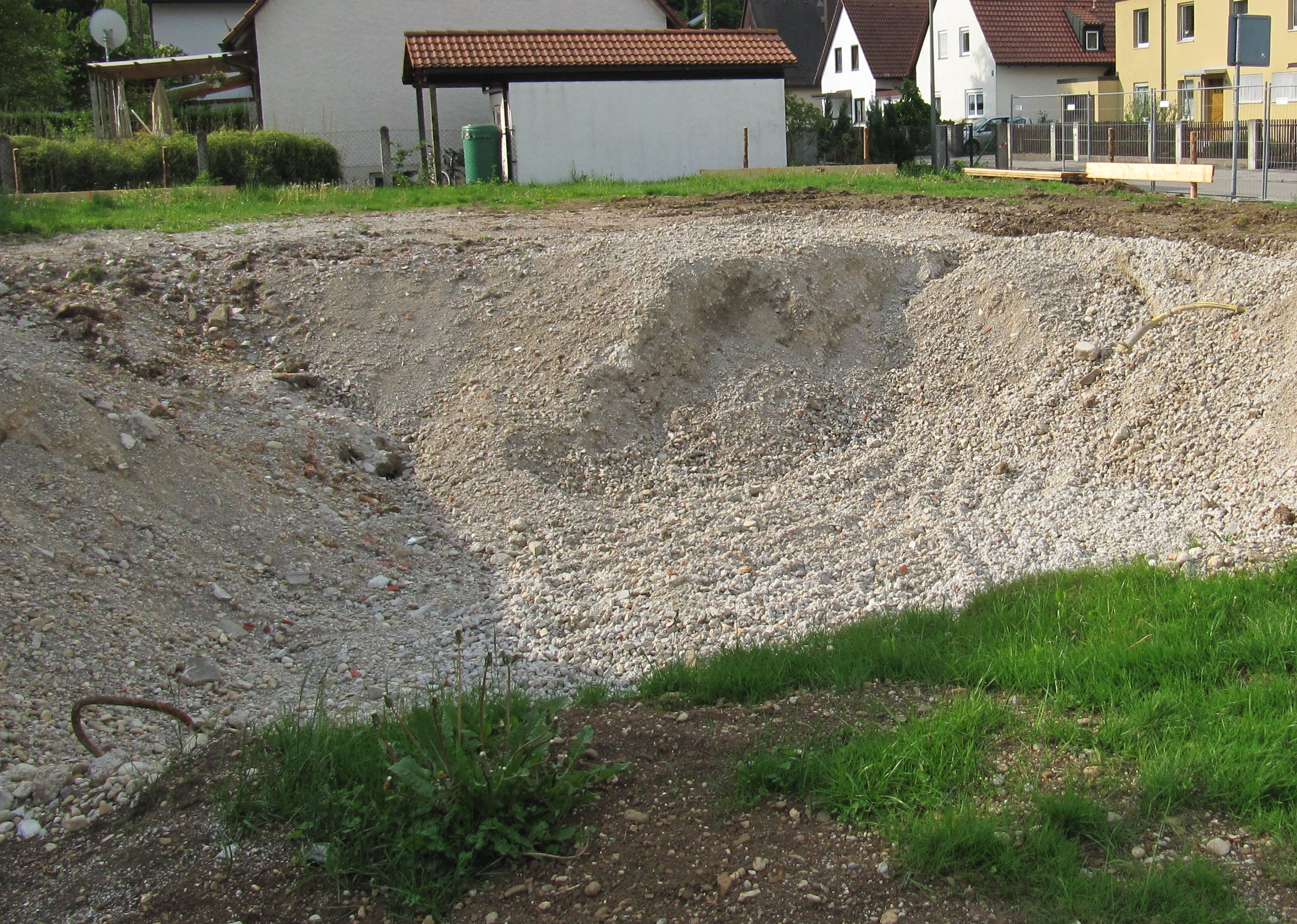
Building pit at Munich-Aubing, with a thin soil layer over a thick gravel deposit

The plain covers a triangular area of around 1,500 square kilometers (580 mi^{2}). The three corners corresponded with the town of Weyarn, between Miesbach and Holzkirchen in the southeast, Moosburg an der Isar in the northeast and Maisach in the west. Munich city and nearly all its peripheral districts are situated on top of the flat gravel plain. As a consequence the city, in contrast to the surrounding counties in the north, south and west, has almost no topographic features. However, the waters of the Isar have cut into the Quaternary ground in several stages and caused the typical terrace levels within the city.

The plain drops to the northeast from initially around 700 m (2,300 ft) above sea level to approximately 400 m (1,300 ft), a decisive factor for the formation of the large Dachauer Moors, the Freisinger Moor and the Erdinger Moor. The gravel deposits of 100 m (330 ft) are the deepest in the south of Munich and decrease towards the north.

== Formation ==
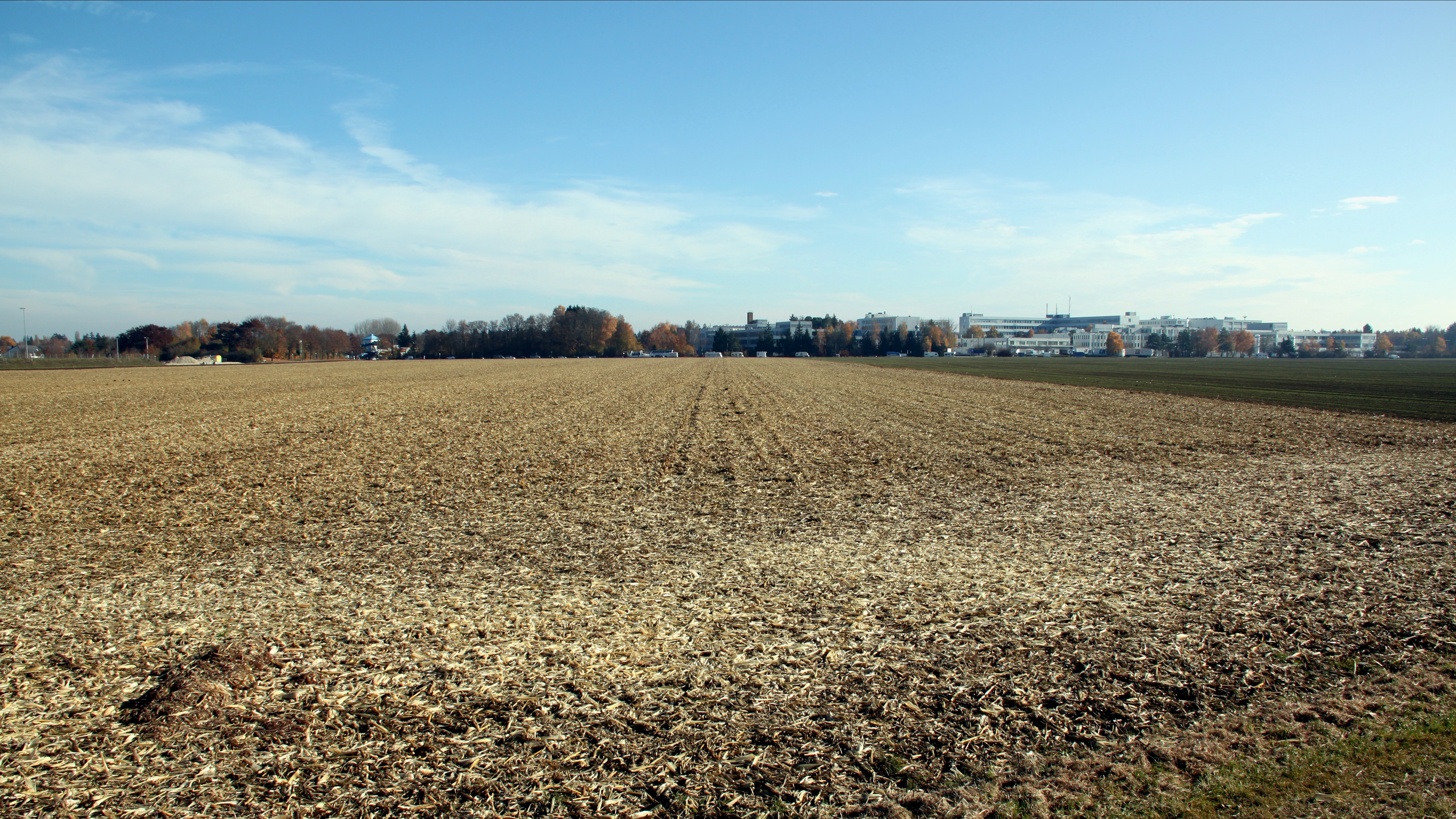
Munich gravel plain near Ottobrunn

According to an unambiguous stratigraphic record the formation process extended over three glacial periods. The massive Central Alpine Pleistocene glaciers, which almost reached the area of modern Munich, discharged not only water but also large amounts of soil and rock into the Alpine Foreland. When the glaciers melted during interglacial warm periods, huge quantities of gravel, debris and water were released and flushed to the north, where they were mainly deposited on the Munich gravel plain. The lowest stratum contains solidified deposits from the Mindel glaciation, above it lies gravel from the Riss glaciation, which in turn is covered by the youngest layer, the rock scree from the Würm glaciation. Layers of clay in between represent the interim humus collections of the respective interglacial periods.

All these ice age gravel deposits lie on top of the low hydraulic conductive sediments of the Molasse basin. The basin's sediment material of conglomerates, shales and debris accumulated by erosion and denudation, forming in sequence during the development of the Alps between around 50 and 3 million years ago. These layers, locally referred to as Flinz, are impermeable to water.

== Waters ==
During the Pleistocene the ancient Mangfall river flowed through the eastern section of what is now the Munich gravel plain before it was deflected to the east towards the Inn by a Würm glaciation moraine. The Grub-Harthausen dry valley is a sector of the former course of the river.

Today the Isar is the largest body of water on the Munich gravel plain. It roughly equally bisects the plain from southwest to northeast. Coming from the district of Starnberg, the Würm river flows through the west of the Munich gravel plain. Further natural waters are the Hachinger Bach and the Gröbenbach and its tributaries, which all, due to exudation of groundwater, rise on the Munich gravel plain.

== Groundwater ==
In the south, the gravel layer of the groundwater-rich Munich gravel plain is the most massive. The top groundwater layer at the Haar-Eglfing measuring point is more than 13 m (43 ft) below ground, in Kirchheim it is around 5 m (16 ft) and on the northern edge of the Munich gravel plain it is less than 1 m (3.3 ft). These levels used to be higher. The Erdinger Moos, which begins north of the municipalities of Aschheim, Kirchheim and Pliening, was once a bog where groundwater surfaced. The outlying communities in the north were frequently flooded after heavy rainfall. To prevent future flooding, a drainage ditch was built in the early 1920s, which caused the groundwater table to drop significantly, which in turn required deeper wells to be dug in these communities.

The thickness of the gravel layer in the south of the Munich gravel plain made it hard to get to the groundwater for the first settlers during the Early Middle Ages. This, however, was essential, as there were no surface waters like ponds or lakes. People settled around the local wells and the settlements were named after the owners of these precious water sources, such as Putzbrunn (once Puzzoprunnin after a Puzzo) or Grasbrunn (Gramasprunnin after a Gramas or Graman).

== Economic significance ==
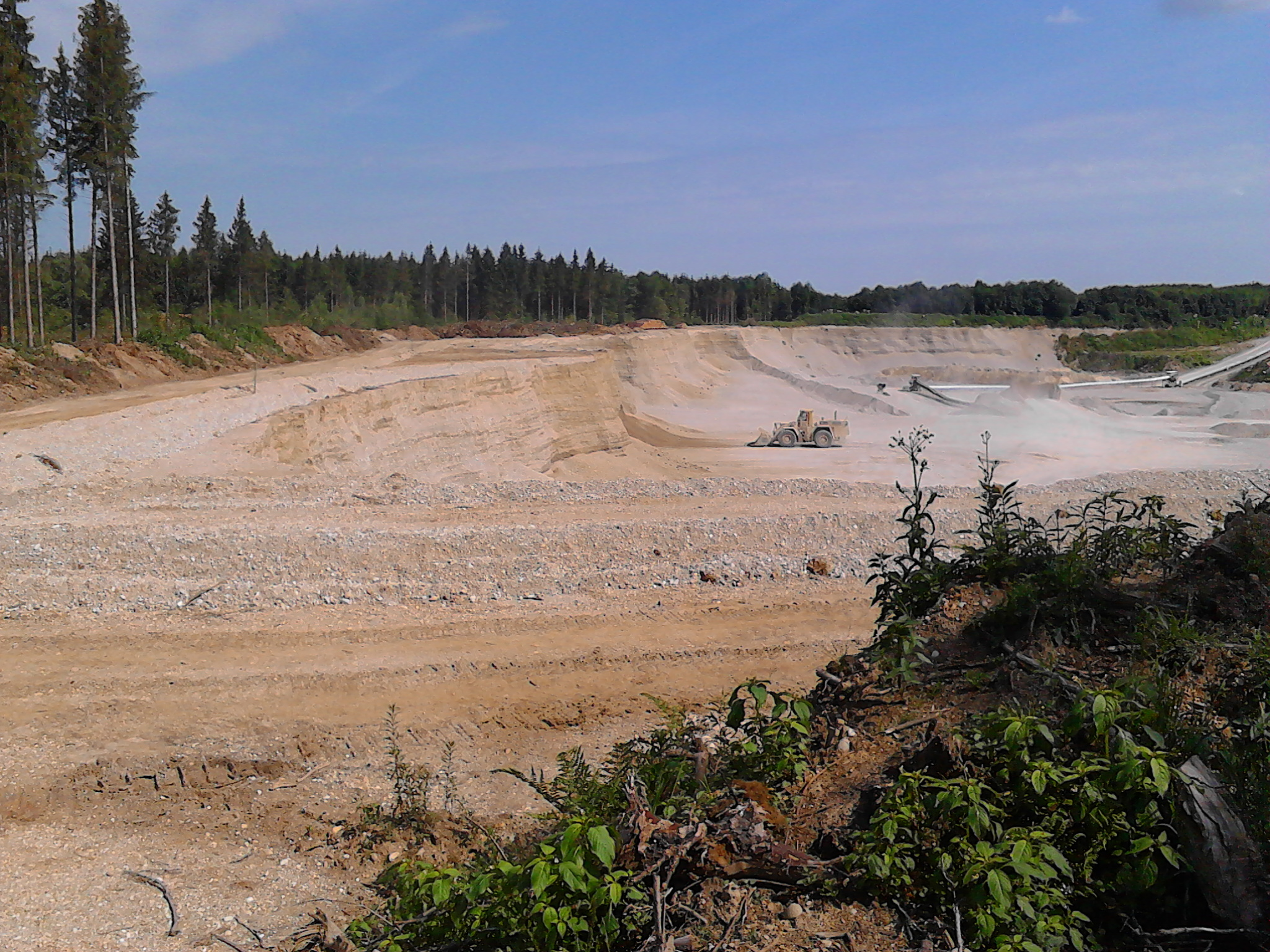
Gravel pit near Planegg

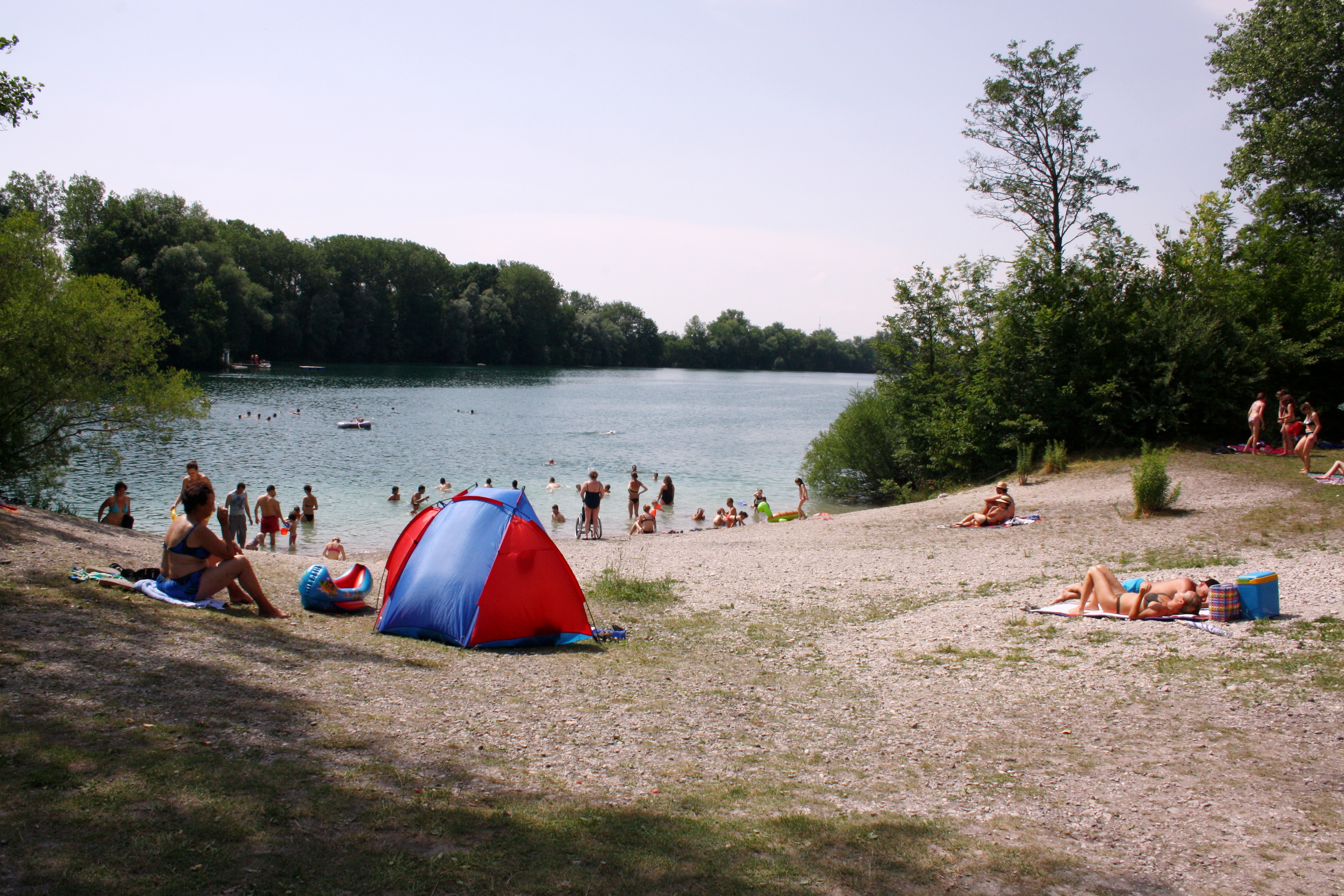
Langwieder Lake in 2012

The surface gravel and sand deposits have long been exploited for use in construction. There still remain several sand and gravel plants, as in Grasbrunn and at Aschheim. At the site of the modern Heimstettener See (Heimstetten Lake), gravel was mined for the Reichsbahn until 1937. The Feringasee (Feringa Lake) gravel was used for the construction of the Autobahn A 99 from 1974 to 1976, and the Böhmerweiher (Böhmerweiher Lake) was created between 1993 and 1999 by sand and gravel mining for the construction of the Autobahn A 8.

Former gravel pits include all the lakes of the Dreiseenplatte (Three Lake district), among them the Lerchenauer See, Fasanerie See and Feldmochinger See, and the three lakes of the Langwieder lake district to the west of Munich. The Langwieder lake district includes the Langwieder See, which provided gravel for the construction of the Autobahn A 8 during the 1930s, the Birkensee, from which gravel was extracted for a railway line in 1938, and the Lußsee, from which gravel was used from 1995 to 2000 for the construction of the Eschenrieder Spange, a shortcut at a junction of the Autobahn A 99. Most of the defunct sand and gravel pits have undergone years of extensive recultivation and have since become popular recreation sites for the inhabitants of metropolitan Munich.

== See also ==
- Parsberg (hill) – a moraine hill west of Munich
