= Gröbenzell station =

Railway station in Germany

Gröbenzell
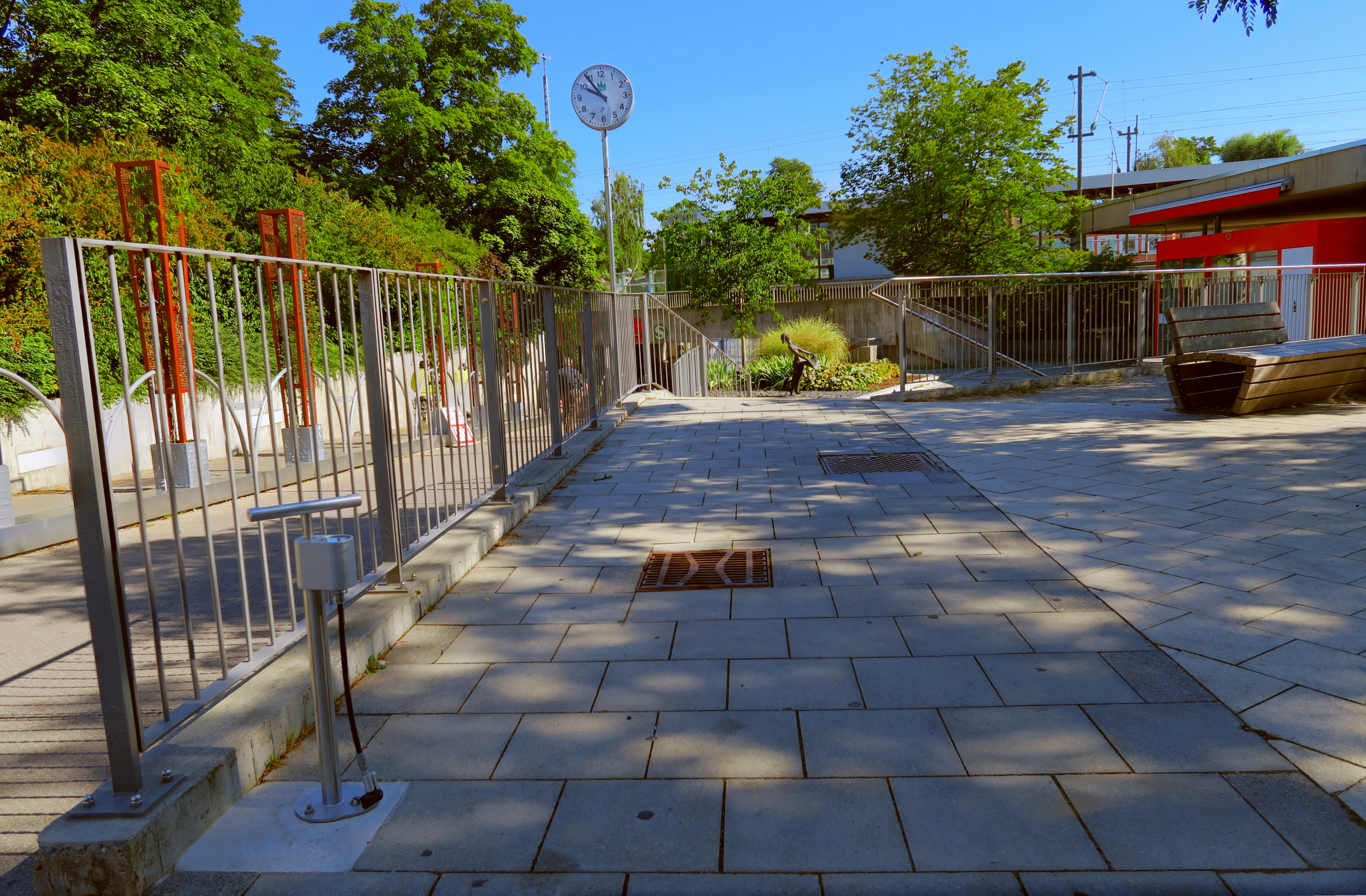
- 2015

General information
- Location: Gröbenbachstraße 3; 82194 Gröbenzell; Bavaria; Germany
- Coordinates: 48.1949°N 11.3741°E
- System: Hp
- Owner: Deutsche Bahn
- Operator: DB Netz; DB Station&Service
- Lines: Munich–Augsburg railway (KBS 999.3)
- Train operators: S-Bahn München
- Connections: 832, 8300

Other information
- Station code: 2281
- DS100 code: MGRZ
- IBNR: 8002377
- Category: 4
- Fare zone: : 1 and 2
- Website: www.bahnhof.de

Services
Preceding station	Munich S-Bahn	Following station
Olching towards Mammendorf	S3	Munich-Lochhausen towards Holzkirchen
Location
- Location within Bavaria Location within Germany Location within Europe

Gröbenzell station is a railway station in the municipality of Gröbenzell, located in the district of Fürstenfeldbruck in Upper Bavaria, Germany.

== Gallery ==
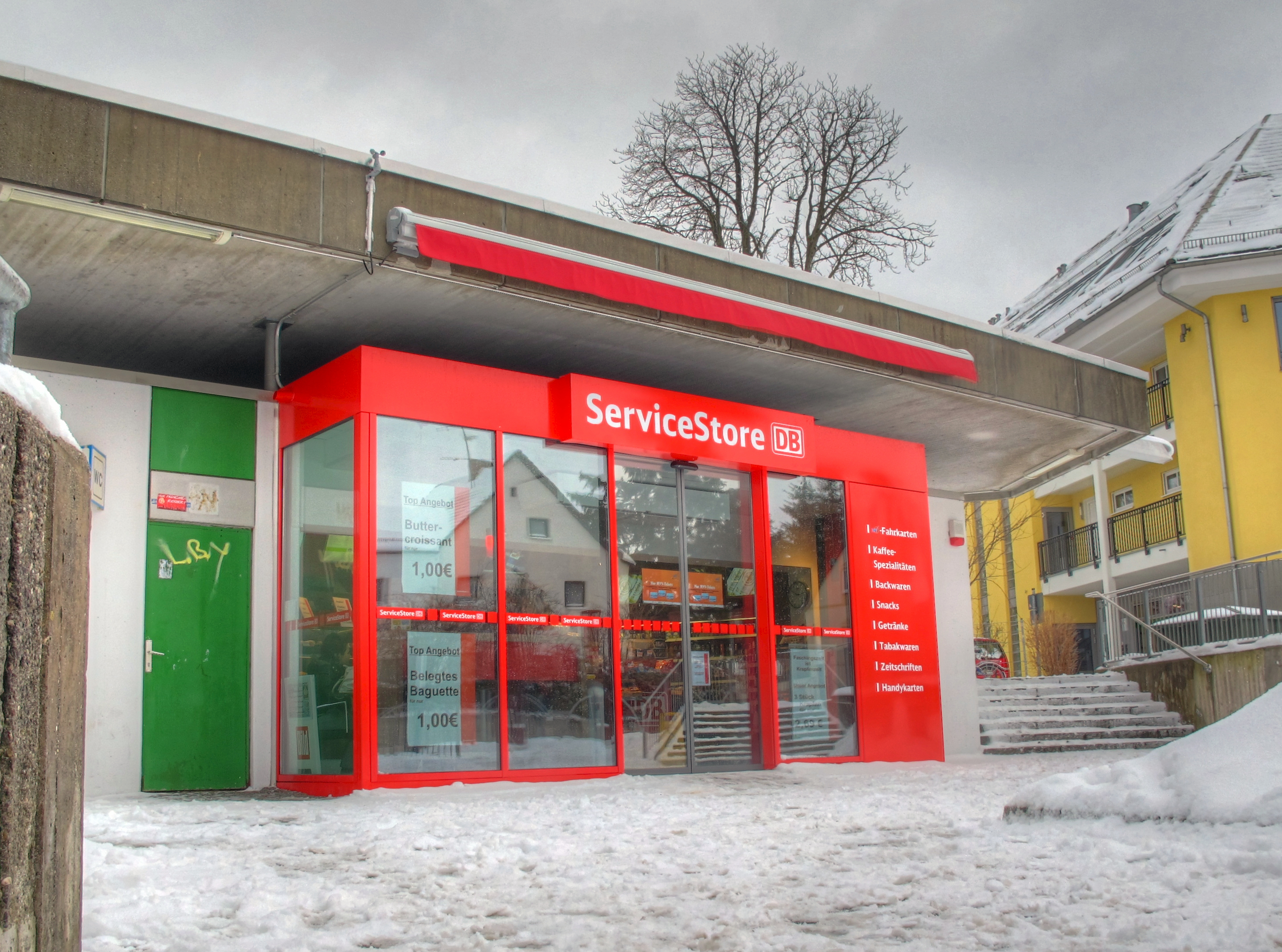
DB ServiceStore at Gröbenzell station (2012).
