= Esting station =

Railway station in Germany

Esting

General information
- Location: Dachauer Straße 2; 82140 Olching; Bavaria; Germany
- Coordinates: 48.2122°N 11.3172°E
- System: Hp
- Owner: Deutsche Bahn
- Operator: DB Netz; DB Station&Service
- Lines: Munich–Augsburg railway (KBS 999.3)
- Train operators: S-Bahn München
- Connections: 835, 8300, X800

Other information
- Station code: 1720
- DS100 code: MESG
- IBNR: 8001996
- Category: 4
- Fare zone: : 1 and 2
- Website: www.bahnhof.de

Services
| Preceding station | Munich S-Bahn | Following station |
|---|---|---|
| Gernlinden towards Mammendorf | S3 | Olching towards Holzkirchen |
Location
- Location within Bavaria Location within Germany Location within Europe

Esting station is a railway station in the Esting district of the municipality of Olching, located in the district of Fürstenfeldbruck in Upper Bavaria, Germany.
