= Munich Leienfelsstraße station =

Railway station in Bavaria, Germany

München Leienfelsstraße
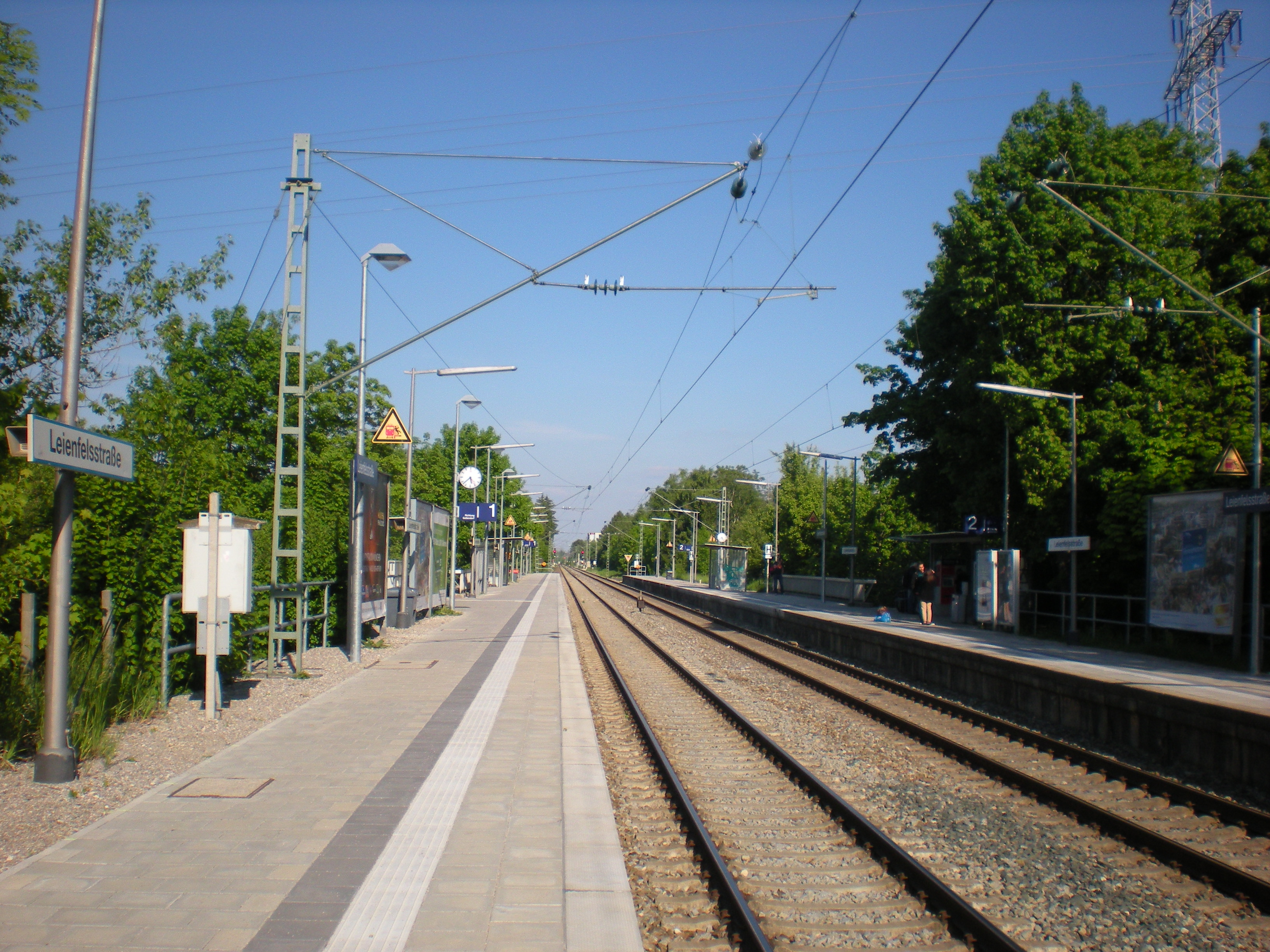
- 2012

General information
- Location: Bad Stebener Weg; 81243 Munich; Aubing-Lochhausen-Langwied; Bavaria, Germany
- Coordinates: 48.1546°N 11.4280°E
- Owner: DB Netz
- Operator: DB Station&Service
- Lines: Munich–Buchloe railway (KBS 970/999.4)
- Train operators: S-Bahn München

Other information
- Station code: 4238
- DS100 code: MLEF
- IBNR: 8004133
- Category: 5
- Fare zone: : M and 1
- Website: www.bahnhof.de

Services
Preceding station	Munich S-Bahn	Following station
Aubing towards Geltendorf	S4	Pasing towards Ebersberg
Aubing towards Geltendorf	S20 Limited service	Pasing towards Höllriegelskreuth
Location
- Location within Bavaria

Munich Leienfelsstraße station is a railway station in the Aubing-Lochhausen-Langwied borough of Munich, Germany.
