= Martin Gregor-Dellin =

German writer

Martin Gregor-Dellin (real name Martin Gustav Schmidt) was a German writer noted for his scholarship on the composer Richard Wagner. He was born in 1926 in Naumburg (Saale) and died in 1988 in Grobenzell. His book Richard Wagner: Sein Leben, Sein Werk, Sein Jahrhundert has been translated into multiple languages.
