= Aubing-Lochhausen-Langwied =

Borough of Munich, Germany

Coordinates: 48°09′30″N 11°25′10″E

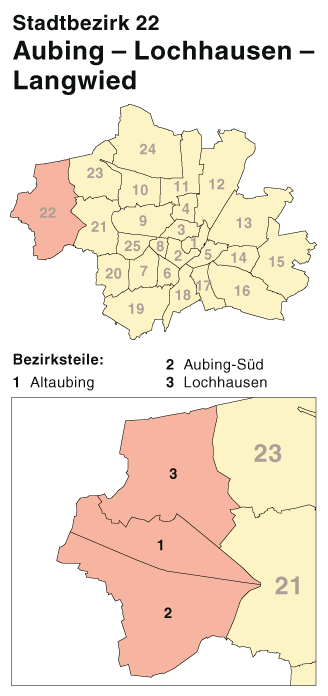
Location of borough 22 in Munich

Aubing-Lochhausen-Langwied (German pronunciation: [ˈaʊbɪŋ lɔxˈhaʊzn̩ ˈlaŋviːt]; Central Bavarian: Aubing-Lochhausn-Langwied) is the 22nd borough of the German city of Munich. The districts Aubing, Lochhausen and Langwied were incorporated together in 1942, thus forming the largest borough of the city at 34,06 km^{2}, yet having the lowest density of population with 37,352 residents as of 2002. This large borough still accommodates many vast agricultural and forest areas that together with the Aubinger Lohe and the Langwieder lake district, fulfill the balance of nature in the area and offer recreational facilities to all of western Munich.

A large area between Aubing/Neuaubing and Germering on Munich ground of the Freiham district, east of Gut Freiham is currently under development.

== History and description ==
=== Aubing ===
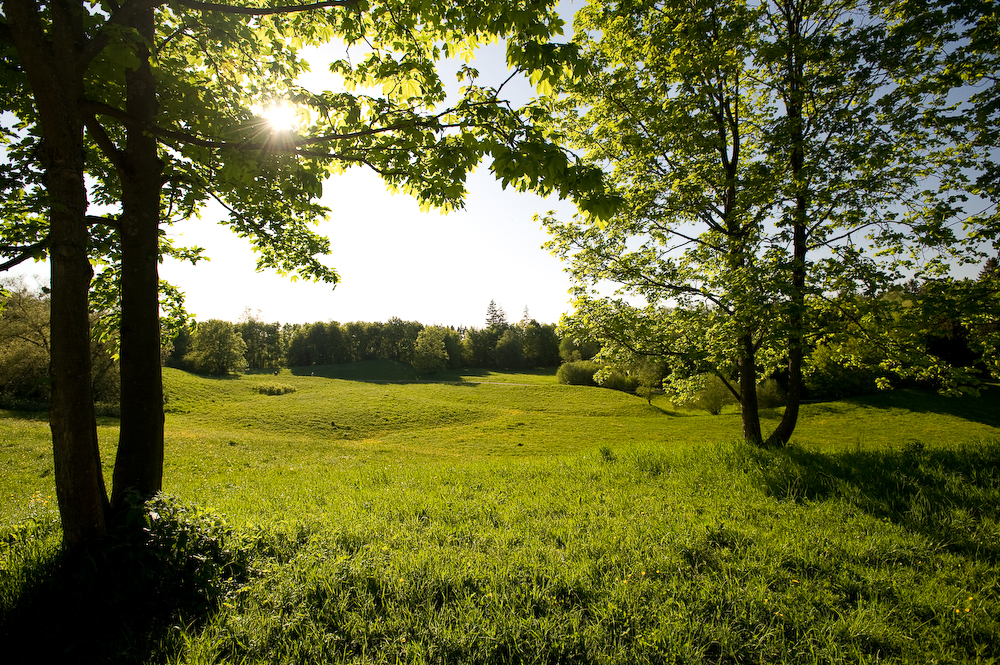
Aubinger Lohe forest

Aubing was first documented in 1010 AD as Ubingen. This name was most likely derived from the name Ubo of the Bavarii, however no such person with that name is actually known of. The longer story which most school children are told, is of "Founder Ubo, who settled here with his cart" is just as well established as the neighbouring borough of Pasing's founding story, in that its name stemmed from "Paoso". Neither are accurate.

In 1818 the municipality of Aubing was established, with the districts Aubing, Freiham and Moosschwaige. On 1 April 1942 the Aubing municipality was connected to Munich, but without a treaty of incorporation.

Aubing is divided by the Munich-Buchloe railway line in Alt-Aubing and Neu-Aubing.

Alt-Aubing reflects the origins of Aubing with buildings that still stand today. The old village centre is built around the gothic/baroque parish church St. Quirin with its approximately one-thousand-year-old romanesque tower built in 1480.

Neuaubing arose at the start of the 20th century as settlement for railwaymen and workers.

==== Coat of arms ====
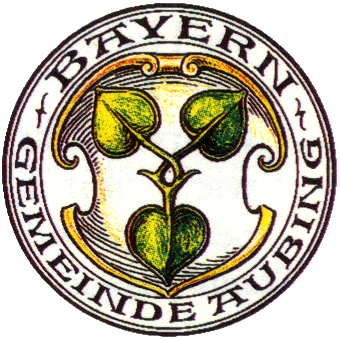
Coat of Arms of Aubing

The Aubing coat of arms goes back to a local aristocratic family from the 12th to the 14th century. It was first mentioned in a document of a known Hartmann of Aubing on 1 May 1334. The layout goes back to Otto Hupp. This was assessment was approved of on 23 February 1933. The coat of arms shows 3 leaves on a silver background.

Today like all other Munich districts, Aubing carries the Munich coat of arms.

==== Clubs ====
Alt-Aubing has many clubs and associations, one of which is the Burschenverein Aubing (Aubing Gentleman's Club) that sets up the maypole in the village centre every three years. Many figures are carved into the wood of the maypole.

=== Lochhausen ===
Lochhausen was first documented in 948/955 AD as Lohhusa. The name means house or houses in the forest.

In 1818 Lochhausen became part of the Langwied municipality. On 1 April 1942 this municipality then became part attached to the city of Munich.

The old village centre is formed around the parish church of St. Michael.

=== Langwied ===
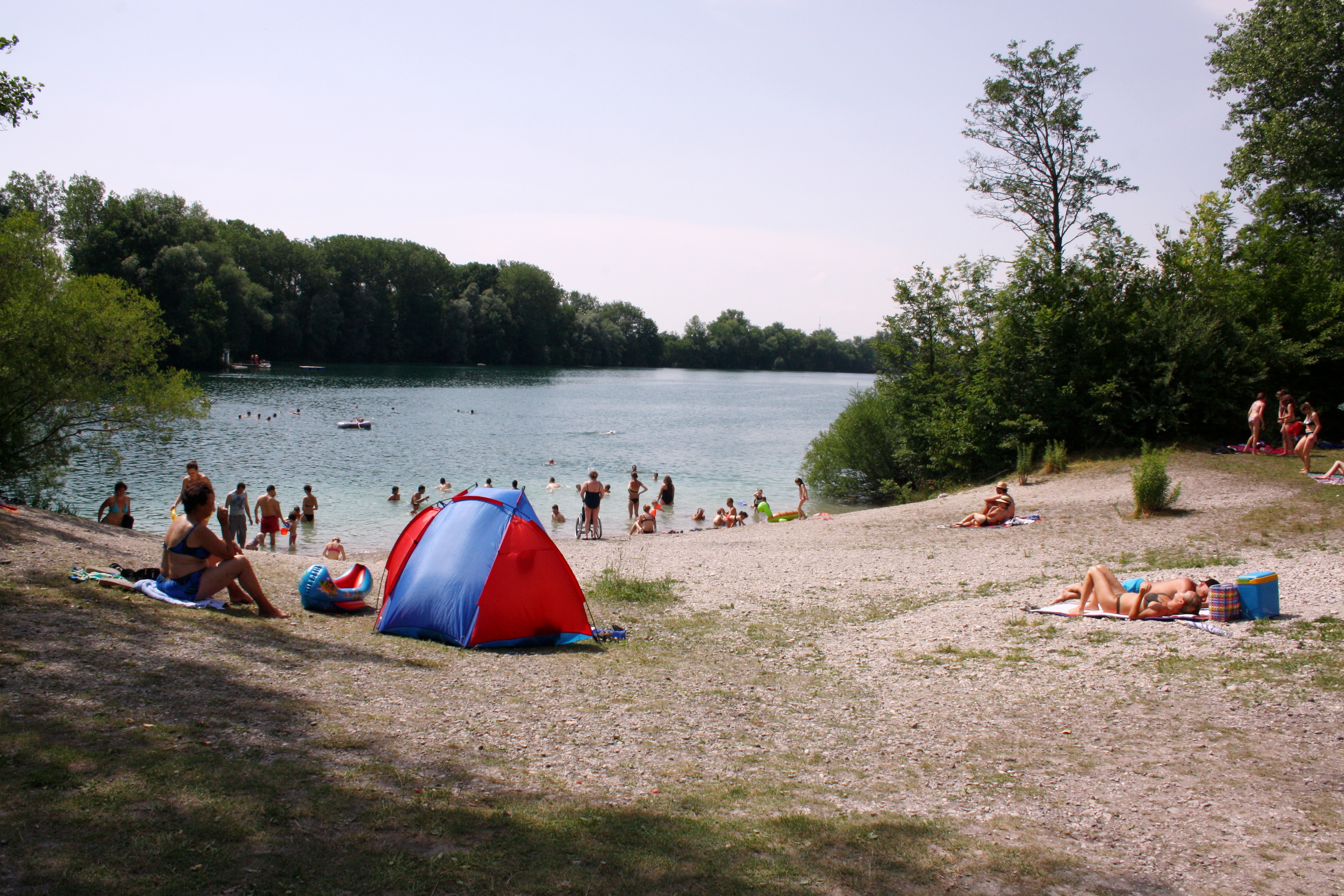
Langwieder See

Langwied was first document in 1269/1271 as "Lanquat". The name Langwied means am langen Wald (althochdeutsch: daz witu = wood, forest). The ending "quat" used up to the 15th century could come from waten (the verb "to wade"), and could allude to a fjord for wading through of the Langwieder brook.

In 1818 the Langwied municipality was formed with Lochhausen and Gröbenzell. On 1 April 1942 the municipality was incorporated into the city of Munich by treaty from 29 August/2 September 1941. Northern parts of Langwied formed the Gröbenzell municipality in 1952 along with other parts of municipalities.

== Transport ==
=== Car ===
The area in and directly around Aubing, Lochhausen and Langwied is connected to by the following junctions:

A 99

- Junction 5 München-Freiham-Mitte
- Junction 7 München-Lochhausen
- Junction 8 Kreuz München-West

A 8

- Junction 80 München-Langwied
- Junction 81 Kreuz München-West

=== Public Transport ===
By Munich S-Bahn, the district is bound by the S4, S5, S6 and S8 lines, at the stops and stations of Langwied, Lochhausen, Leienfelsstraße, Aubing, Westkreuz and Neuaubing of the MVV. Numerous bus lines further connect the district.

=== Longest tunnel in Bavaria ===
Since the opening of the section of the A 99 as a connection between the München-Lochhausen junction and the A 96 München-Lindau route in February 2006 which resulted in the tunneling of large parts of Aubing, at 1,935m long Aubing has the largest automobile tunnel in Bavaria.

== Statistics ==
(As of 31 December, Inhabitants with principal residence.)

Year	Inhabitants	of which Foreigners	Area in ha.	Inhabitants per ha.	Source
2000	37,425	6,576 (17.6%)	3,404.56	11	Statistisches Taschenbuch München 2001. pdf-Download
2001	37,693	6,659 (17.7%)	3,404.56	11	Statistisches Taschenbuch München 2002. pdf-Download
2002	37,532	6,650 (17.7%)	3,404.56	11	Statistisches Taschenbuch München 2003. pdf-Download
2003	37,556	6,739 (17.9%)	3,405.09	11	Statistisches Taschenbuch München 2004. pdf-Download
2004	37,595	6,835 (18.2%)	3,405.63	11	Statistisches Taschenbuch München 2005. pdf-Download
2005	37,560	7,015 (18.7%)	3,405.76	11	Statistisches Taschenbuch München 2006. pdf-Download

== Sources ==
- Helmuth Stahleder: Von Allach bis Zamilapark, released by the Stadtarchiv München, Buchendorfer Verlag (2001)
