= Gernlinden station =

Railway station in Germany

Gernlinden
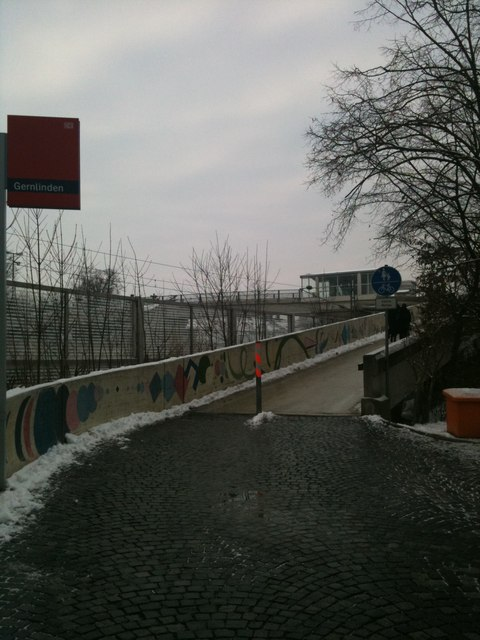
- 2011

General information
- Location: Heinestraße; 82216 Maisach; Bavaria; Germany
- Coordinates: 48.2128°N 11.2996°E
- Owner: Deutsche Bahn
- Operator: DB Netz; DB Station&Service
- Lines: Munich–Augsburg railway (KBS 999.3)
- Train operators: S-Bahn München
- Connections: 872, 8300, 8700

Other information
- Station code: 2094
- DS100 code: MGLD
- IBNR: 8002247
- Category: 4
- Fare zone: : 2
- Website: www.bahnhof.de

Services
Preceding station	Munich S-Bahn	Following station
Maisach towards Mammendorf	S3	Esting towards Holzkirchen
Location
- Location within Bavaria Location within Germany Location within Europe

Gernlinden station is a railway station in the Gernlinden district of the municipality of Maisach, located in the district of Fürstenfeldbruck in Upper Bavaria, Germany.
