= Munich-Langwied station =

Railway station in Munich, Germany

München Langwied
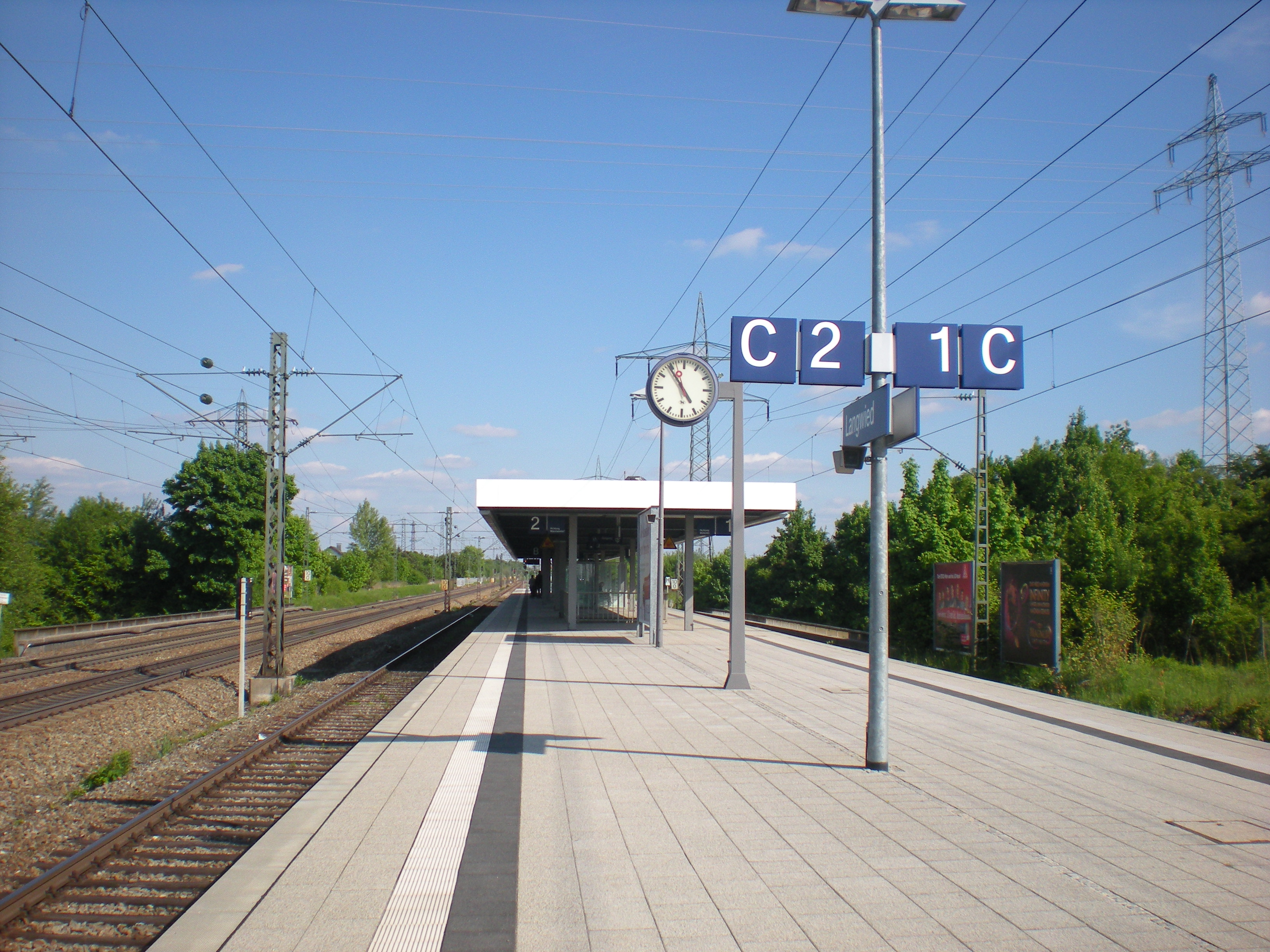
- 2012

General information
- Location: Bergsonstraße; 81245 Munich; Aubing-Lochhausen-Langwied; Bavaria, Germany
- Coordinates: 48.1631°N 11.4323°E
- Owner: DB Netz
- Operator: DB Station&Service
- Lines: Munich–Augsburg railway (KBS 999.3)
- Train operators: S-Bahn München
- Connections: 143, N80, N81

Other information
- Station code: 4259
- DS100 code: MLW
- IBNR: 8004152
- Category: 4
- Fare zone: : M and 1
- Website: www.bahnhof.de

Services
Preceding station	Munich S-Bahn	Following station
Lochhausen towards Mammendorf	S3	Pasing towards Holzkirchen
Location
- Location within Bavaria Location within Germany Location within Europe

Munich-Langwied station is a railway station in the Aubing-Lochhausen-Langwied borough of Munich, Germany.
