= Parsberg (hill) =

Hill in Bavaria, Germany

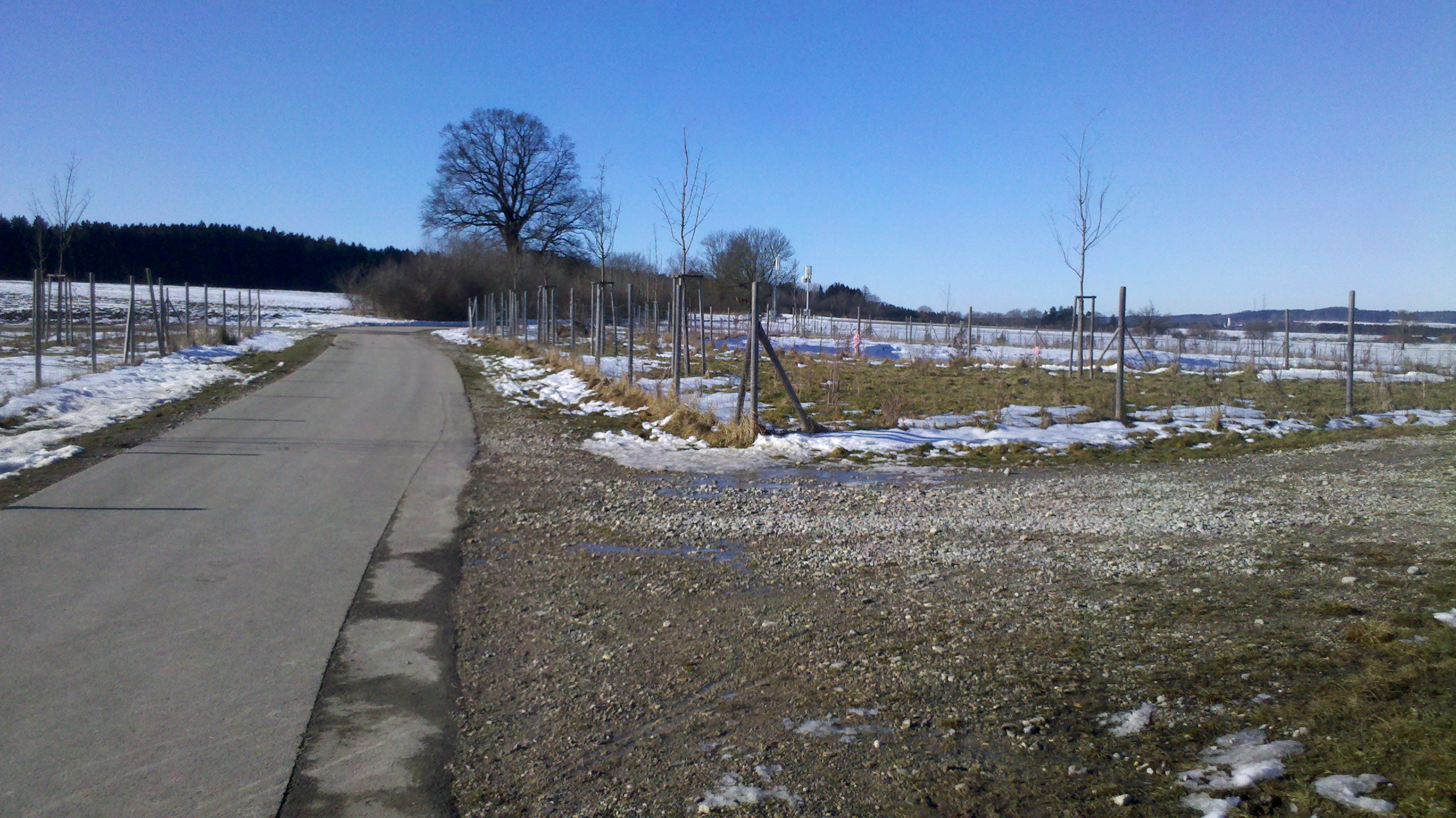
- The Parsberg

Highest point
- Elevation: 569 m (1,867 ft)
- Coordinates: 48°07′59″N 11°19′40″E

Geography
- Location within Bavaria
- Location: Fürstenfeldbruck, Bavaria, Germany

Geology
- Rock type: Moraine

The Parsberg is a wooded hill, 569 metres (1,867 ft) high, in the district of Fürstenfeldbruck in Upper Bavaria, Germany. It lies west of Munich, between Germering, Alling and Puchheim.

== Geology ==
The hill is a glacial moraine. Its slopes consist of glacial till from the Mindel glaciation, overlying the Upper Freshwater Molasse, a Miocene freshwater deposit of clay, silt and marl, while the summit carries a Pleistocene cap of loess loam.

== Landscape protection area ==
Much of the hill lies within the Parsberg landscape protection area (Landschaftsschutzgebiet, LSG-00309.06), which covers 488.44 hectares (1,207.0 acres) in the district of Fürstenfeldbruck.

== History ==
A medieval fortified site, the Burgstall Parsberg, stood on the hill above the Germeringer See. An excavation in 1993 dated its earthwork to the High Middle Ages, around the 12th century, from which time the hilltop was settled and fortified. The earthwork covers about 3,000 square metres (32,000 sq ft), with ditches up to 30 metres (98 ft) wide and ramparts up to 6 metres (20 ft) high, and guarded the road running from Munich over the Parsberg towards the Amper and the Lech; a toll levied an dem Parsberg was pledged by King Louis IV to Heinrich von Schwarzenberg in 1321. The Bavarian heritage register lists it as a scheduled monument (Bodendenkmal D-1-7834-0003).

On 19 September 1422, Bavaria-Munich defeated Louis VII of Bavaria-Ingolstadt at the Battle of Alling, fought near Alling, one of the villages bordering the hill; the victory ended the Bavarian War.

== See also ==
- Munich gravel plain
