= Munich-Lochhausen station =

Railway station in Germany

München Lochhausen
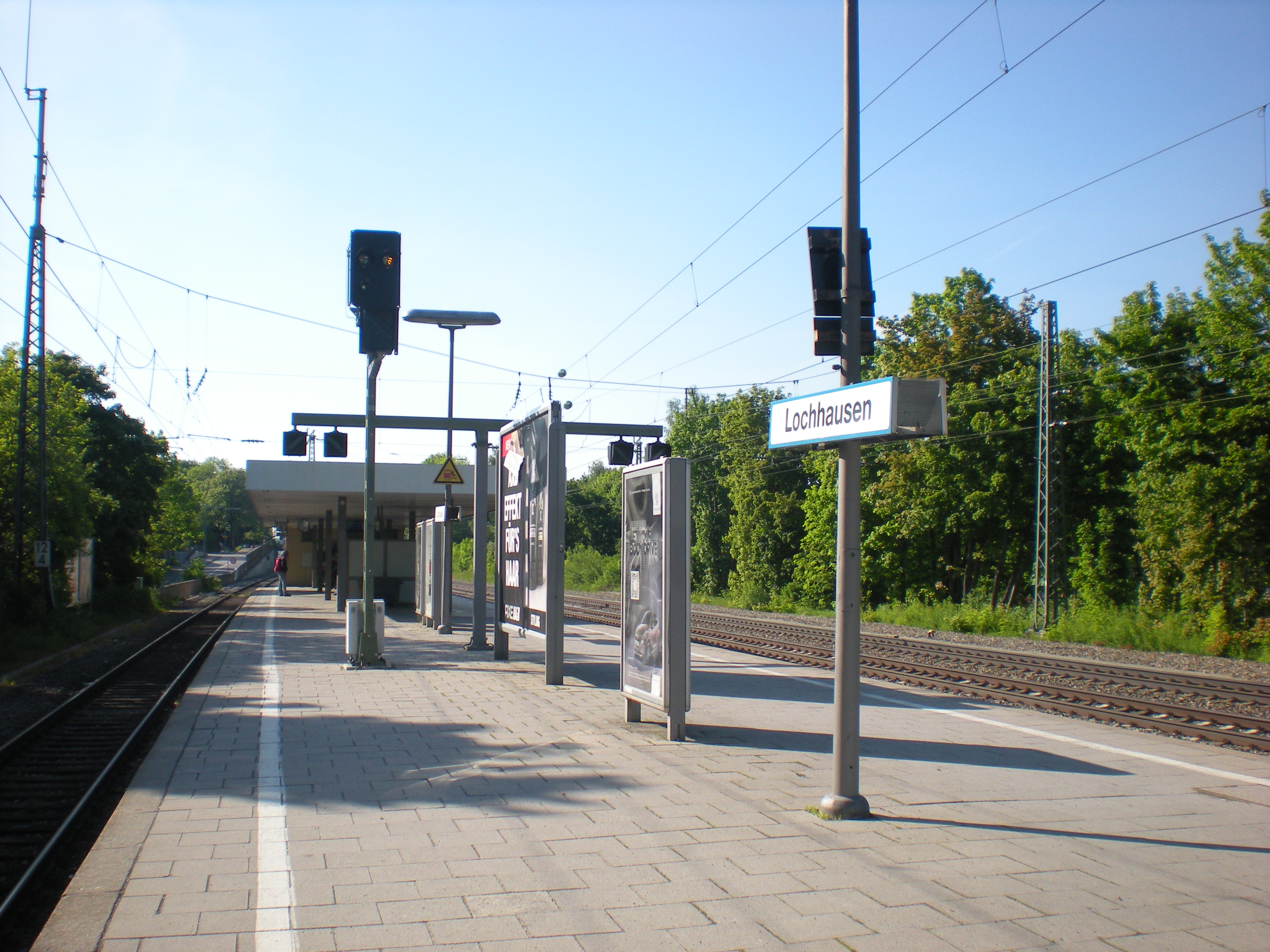
- 2012

General information
- Location: Henschelstraße 8; 81249 Munich; Aubing-Lochhausen-Langwied; Bavaria; Germany
- Coordinates: 48.1760°N 11.4088°E
- Owner: Deutsche Bahn
- Operator: DB Netz; DB Station&Service
- Lines: Munich–Augsburg railway (KBS 999.3)
- Train operators: S-Bahn München
- Connections: 159, 162, 830, 8300, N80, N81, X80,

Other information
- Station code: 4260
- DS100 code: MLO
- IBNR: 8004153
- Category: 4
- Fare zone: : M and 1
- Website: www.bahnhof.de

Services
Preceding station	Munich S-Bahn	Following station
Gröbenzell towards Mammendorf	S3	Langwied towards Holzkirchen
Location

Munich-Lochhausen station is a railway station in the Aubing-Lochhausen-Langwied borough of Munich, Germany.
