= Olching station =

Railway station in Germany

Olching
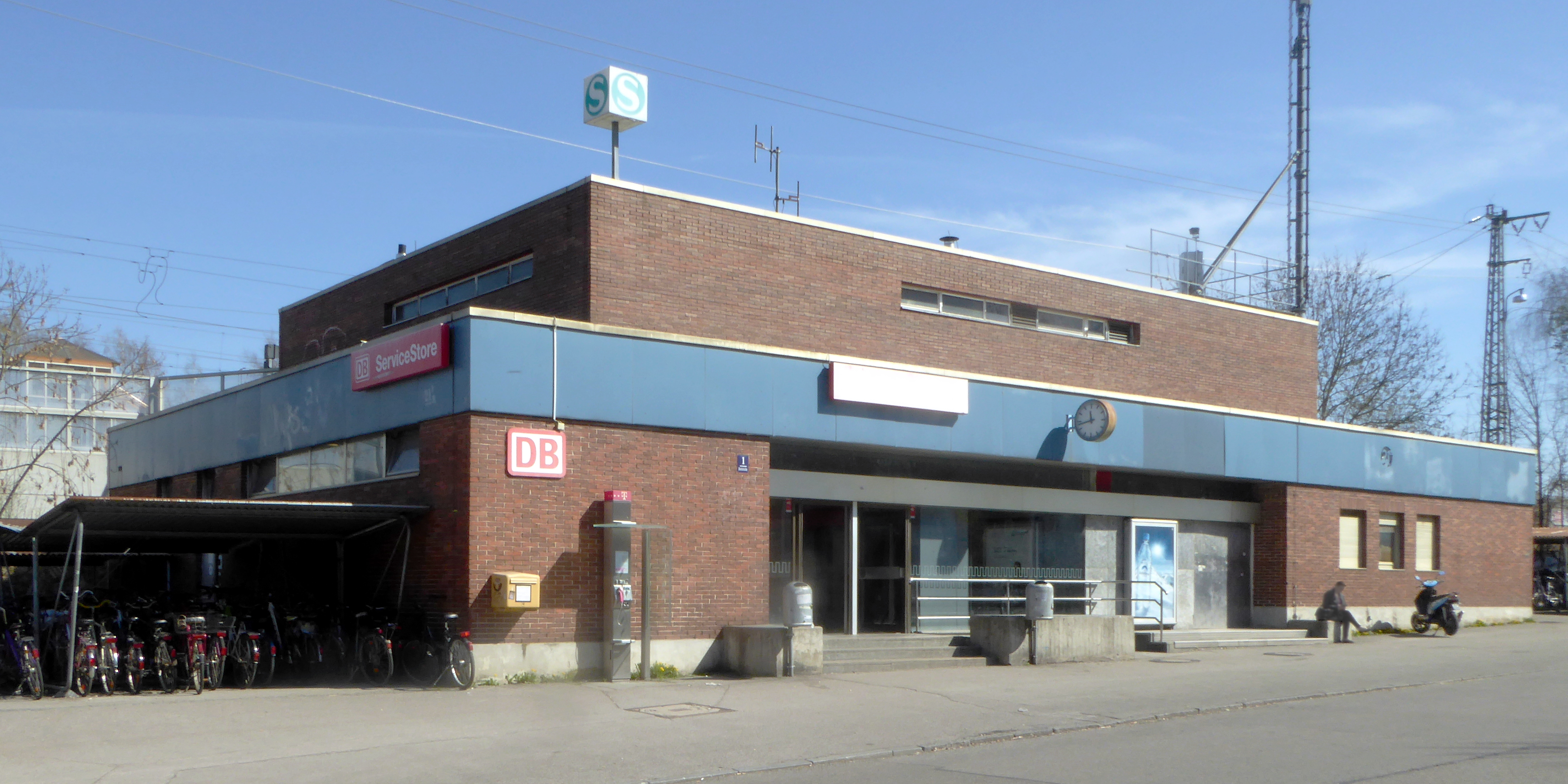
- 2017

General information
- Location: Bahnhofstraße 1; 82140 Olching; Bavaria; Germany
- Coordinates: 48.2101°N 11.3341°E
- Owner: DB Netz
- Operator: DB Station&Service
- Lines: Munich–Augsburg railway (KBS 999.3)
- Train operators: S-Bahn München
- Connections: 831, 832, 833, 843, 860, 8300

Other information
- Station code: 4763
- DS100 code: MOL
- IBNR: 8004667
- Category: 4
- Fare zone: : 1 and 2
- Website: www.bahnhof.de

Services
Preceding station	Munich S-Bahn	Following station
Esting towards Mammendorf	S3	Gröbenzell towards Holzkirchen
Location

Olching station is a railway station in the municipality of Olching, located in the district of Fürstenfeldbruck in Upper Bavaria, Germany.
