= Langwieder lake district =

Coordinates: 48°11′51″N 11°24′53″E

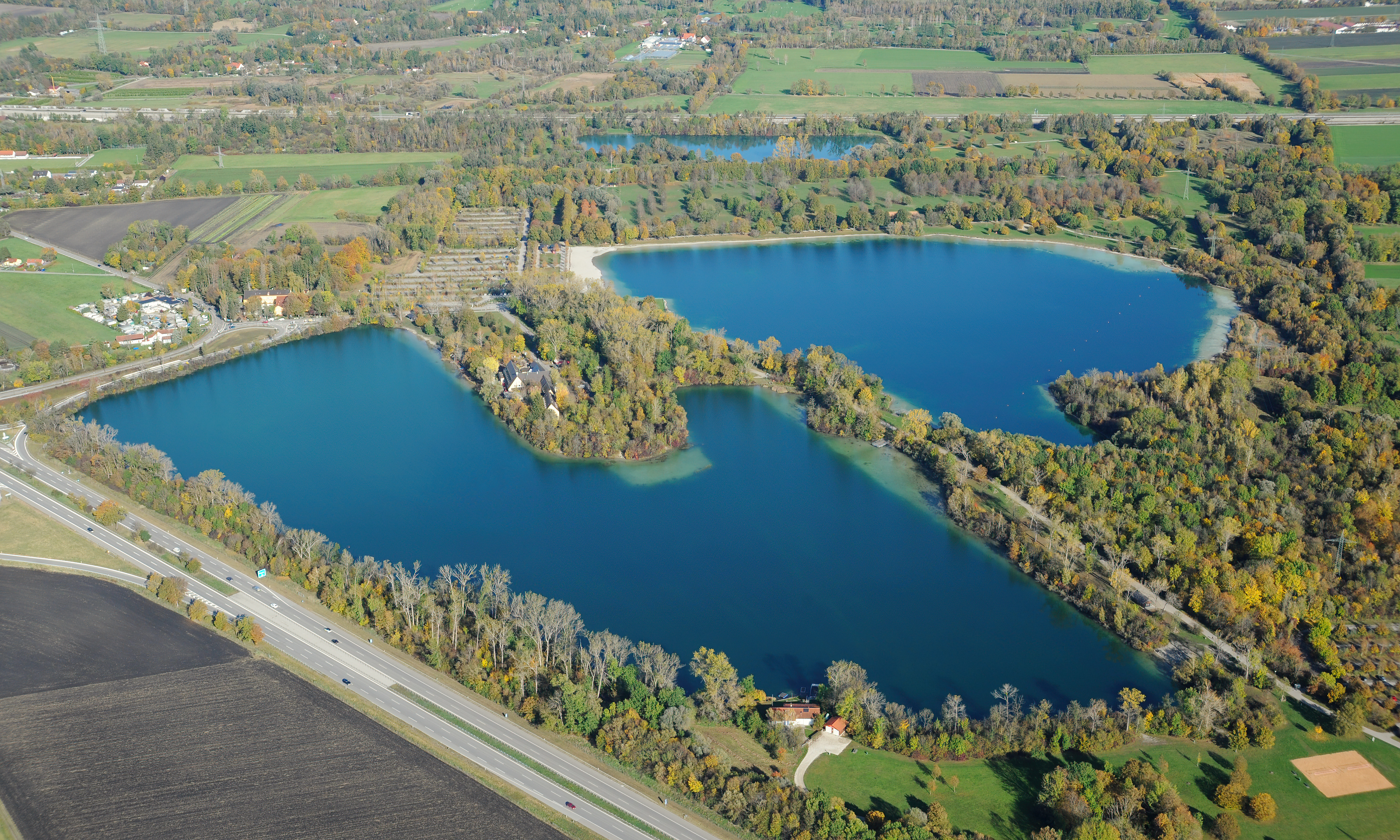
Aerial image of the Langwieder lake district: Langwieder See, Lußsee, and Birkensee (from front to back)

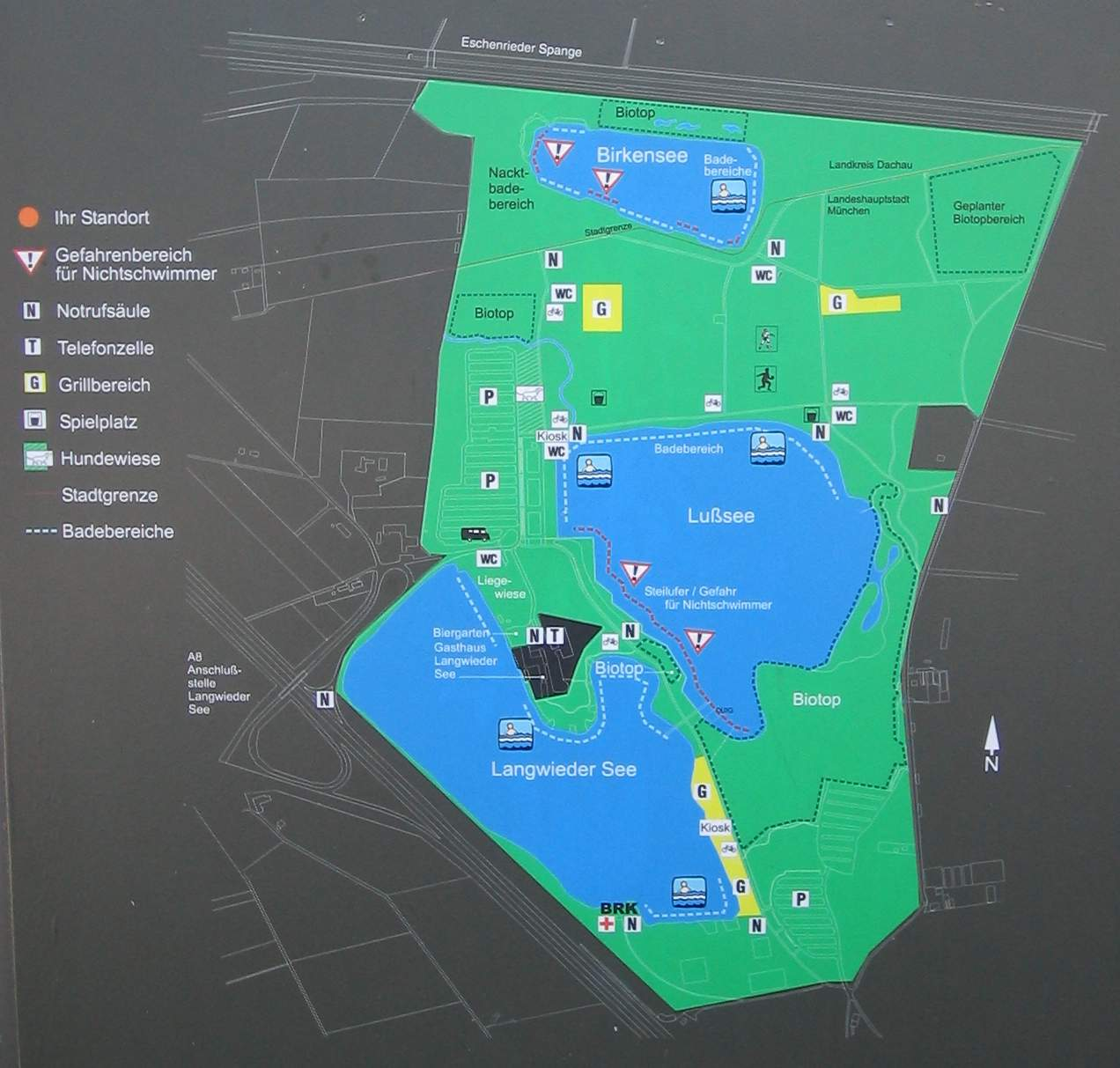
Map overview of the three lakes. From top to bottom: the Birkensee, the Lußsee and the Langwieder See.

The Langwieder lake district (German: Langwieder Seenplatte) is composed of three lakes west of Munich in Bavaria, Germany. It opened in the year 2000 as a recreational area enclosing the Langwieder See, the Lußsee, and the Birkensee. The entire site spans 120 hectares (297 acres); 40 of which are the lakes and 80 are land; 27 hectares (67 acres) of which are lawns for sunbathing.

== Langwieder See ==
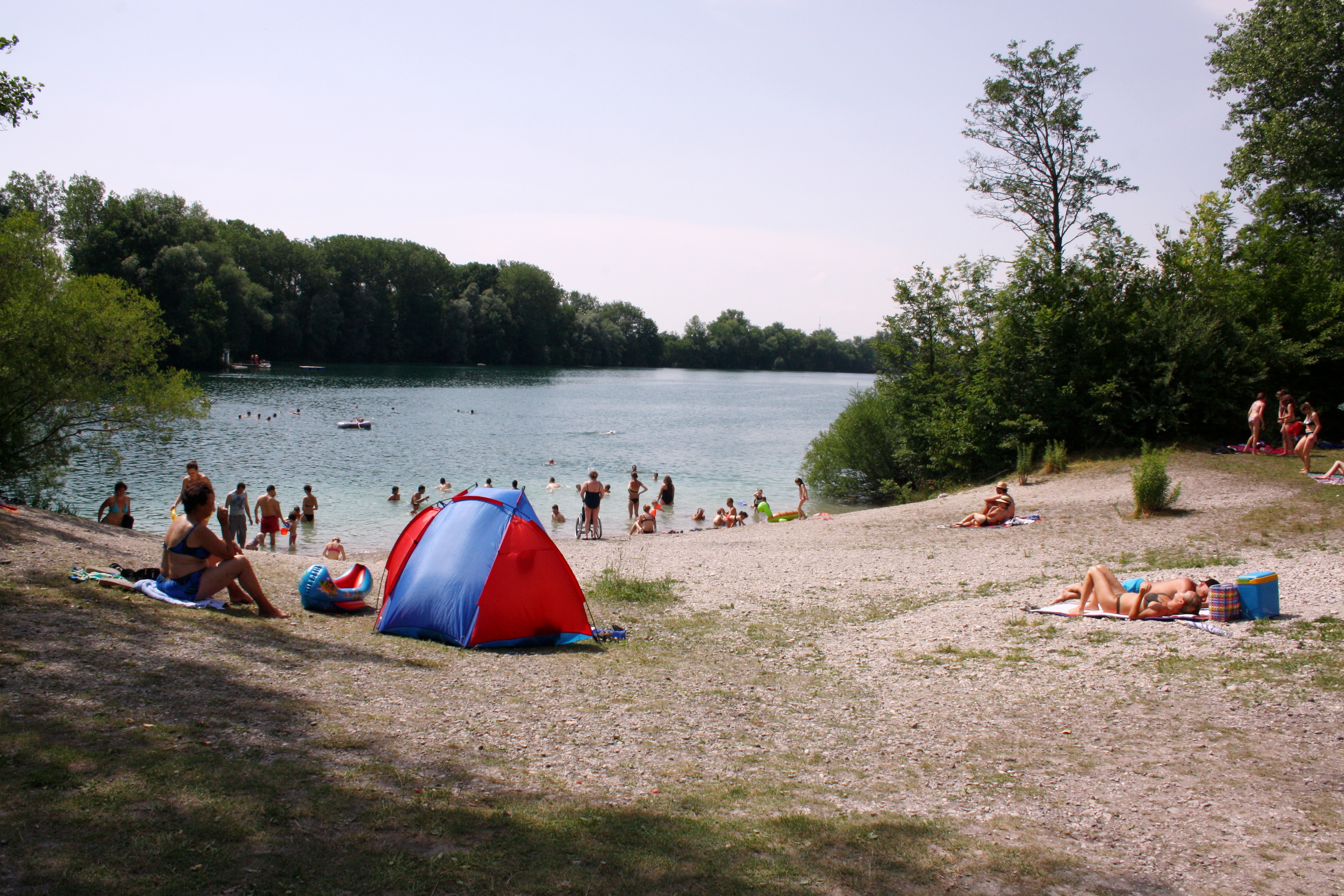
Bathing section, Langwieder See

The Langwieder See lies to the west of Munich by the A8 Autobahn to Stuttgart and was created by the excavation of gravel for motorway construction in the 1930s. It covers an area of approximately 18 hectares (44 acres), is 8 metres deep at its deepest point, and has a shoreline of 2.2 kilometres (1.4 mi). It is the second largest standing body of water in Munich.

Available activities include a miniature golf course and rowing boat rental. Diving is also permitted in the northeastern part of the lake. A former motorway service station was converted into a hotel and restaurant with a beer garden; also near the lake is a campsite. At the water's edge in the south is the rescue station belonging to the Munich Wasserwacht or water patrol, where a rapid response unit can be found. The station also provides assistance to the Lußsee and Birkensee.

== Lußsee ==
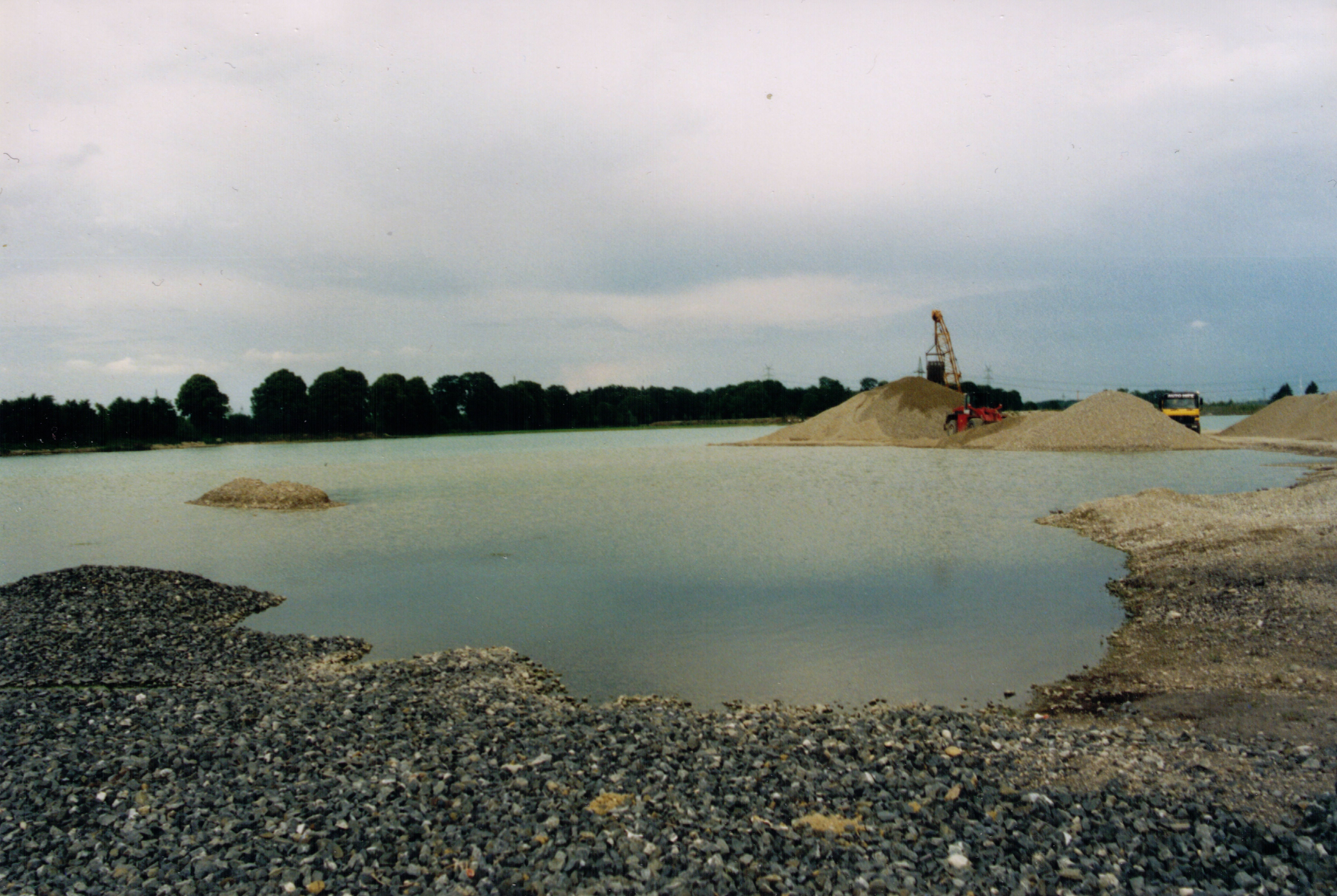
Construction of the Lußsee (1999)

Covering an area of approximately 17 hectares (42 acres) and with a shoreline of 2.2 kilometres (1.4 mi), the Lußsee lies between the Langwieder See and the Birkensee, and is immediately adjacent to the Langwieder See. Constructed between 1995 and 2000, it is 16 metres deep at its deepest point, and is one of the newest bathing lakes in north-west Munich. It originated as a gravel excavation pit for the construction of the Eschenried bypass, a small section of the A99 Autobahn, for which more than two million cubic metres of gravel were excavated. Southern and eastern areas of the lake were created as biotopes to compensate for the construction work, and there are also large areas of short grass next to it for sunbathing. In the north-east of the lake is a large pebble shore with a promenade and kiosk. To the east is the water patrol's boat house, situated where the Lußsee and Landwieder See are nearest to each other. The lake is notable for its crystal-clear water: in the year 2000 it was voted as the cleanest lake in Munich.

== Birkensee ==
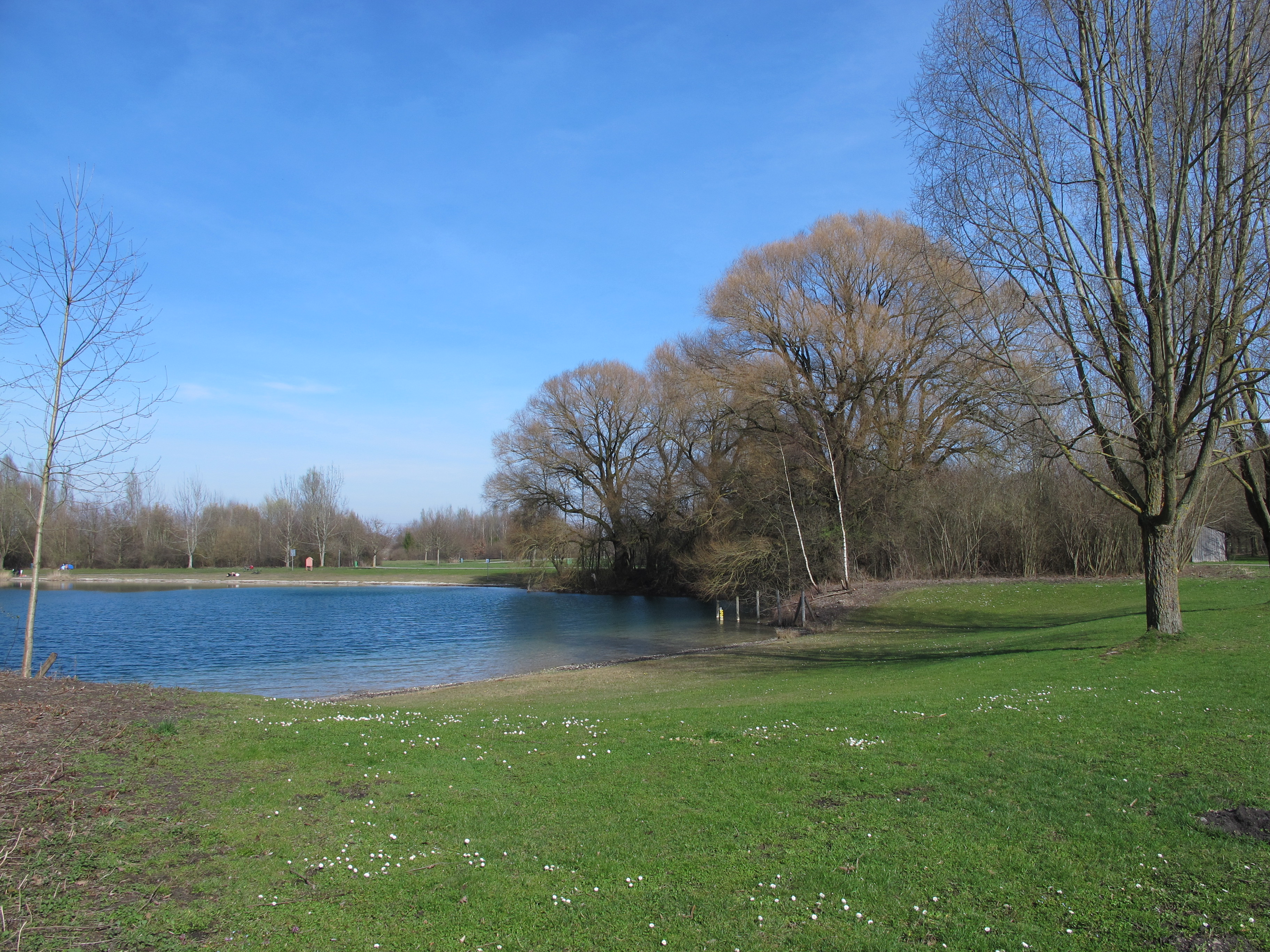
Birkensee in spring

Approximately 200 metres north of the Lußsee is the Birkensee. Located in Bergkirchen in the Dachau district, this lake is also a result of gravel excavation in the 1930s. It covers an area of approximately 5 hectares (12 acres), is six metres deep at its deepest point, and has a shoreline of 0.9 kilometres (0.6 mi).

== Access ==
The lakes can be accessed directly from the A8 via the "München-Langwied" exit, and there is a 1,100-space car park in the west and a 700-space one in the south. During the bathing season, a bus service operates from Lochausen S-Bahn station, from which the distance is approximately 2 kilometres (1.2 mi). Gröbenzell S-Bahn station is approximately 3 kilometres (1.9 mi) away, and Allach and Karlsfeld stations approximately 4 kilometres (2.5 mi).
