= Gröbenzell =

- Municipality
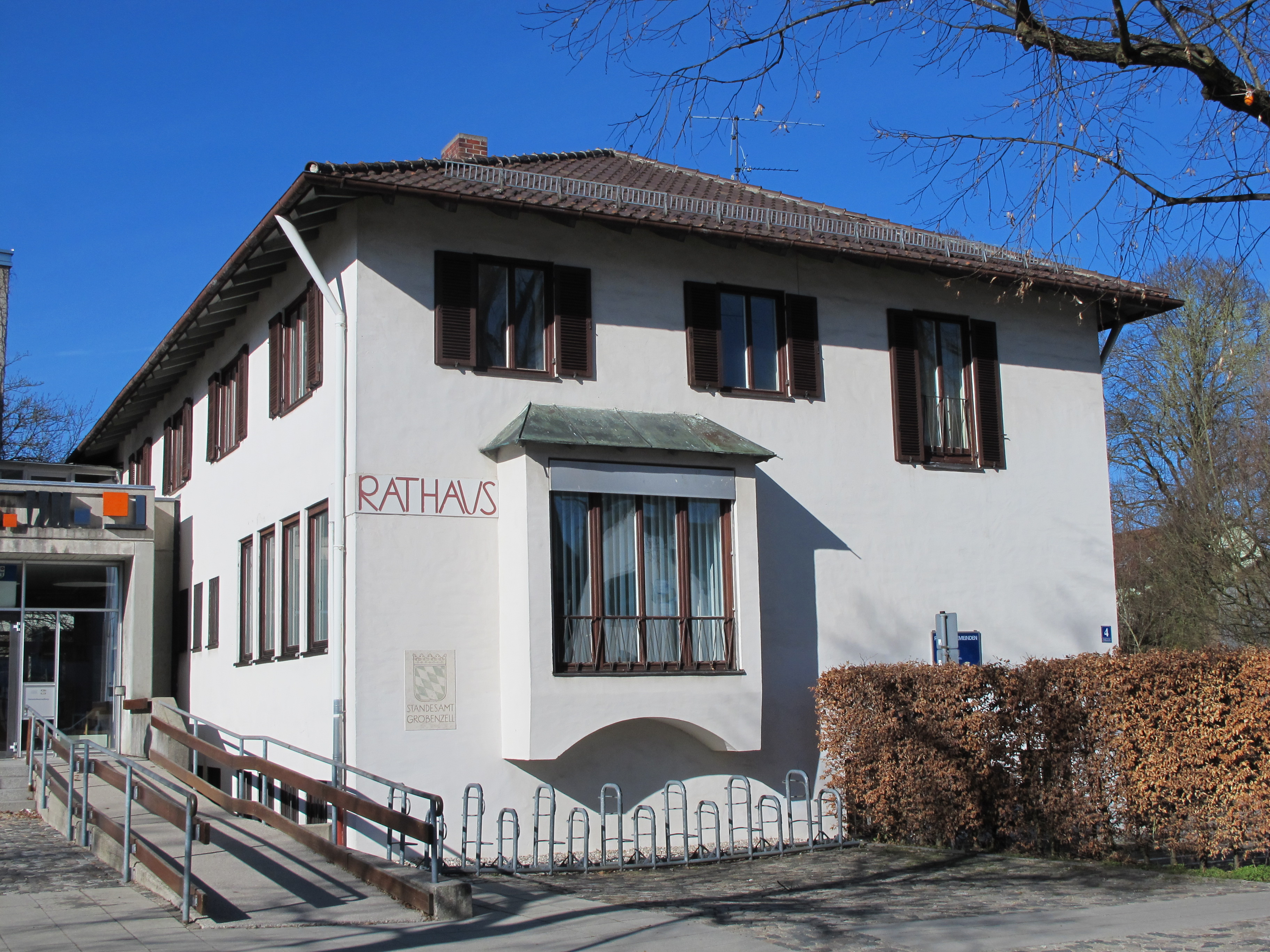
- Old town hall

- Coat of arms

- Location of Gröbenzell within Fürstenfeldbruck district
- Interactive map of Gröbenzell
- Location within Germany Location within Bavaria
- Coordinates: 48°12′N 11°22′E
- Country: Germany
- State: Bavaria
- Admin. region: Oberbayern
- District: Fürstenfeldbruck

Government
  - Mayor (2020–26): Martin Schäfer

Area
  - Total: 6.36 km^{2} (2.46 sq mi)
- Elevation: 506 m (1,660 ft)

Population (2025-12-31)
  - Total: 19,206
  - Density: 3,020/km^{2} (7,820/sq mi)
- Time zone: UTC+01:00 (CET)
  - Summer (DST): UTC+02:00 (CEST)
- Postal codes: 82194
- Dialling codes: 08142
- Vehicle registration: FFB
- Website: www.groebenzell.de

Gröbenzell (German pronunciation: [ˈɡʁøːbn̩tsɛl]) is a municipality and suburb to Munich in the district Fürstenfeldbruck, in Bavaria, Germany. It was founded in 1952, and has a population of 19,202. Gröbenzell is often called a garden city, which is also illustrated by the two flowers in the coat of arms.

Gröbenzell is one of the most densely populated municipalities in Germany and is the most populous municipality in the district of Fürstenfeldbruck without city status. There are no further municipal subdivisions. Gröbenzell was founded as a political municipality. In doing so, parts of municipalities from Munich, Puchheim, Olching, and Geiselbullach were merged into one location around the Gröbenzell train station.

== Geography ==
Gröbenzell is located at the creek Gröbenbach at the margin of the Dachauer Moos, an area that once was predominantly marshy. Since the end of the 19th century, most of that land was dried up by Drainage. Nowadays most of the surrounding area is used as farmland. Also to the north and the south of Gröbenzell lie some small lakes, which are used as recreation areas by the residents of the area.

To the south Gröbenzell seamlessly borders Puchheim, to the north-west lies Olching and to the east the Munich district Lochhausen is located.

== History ==
In 1560 Duke Albrecht V founded the Gröbenhüterhaus, which acted as the sovereign customs office. The name Gröbenzell was first documented in 1725. It refers to a toll ("Zoll") station that was built next to the creek Gröbenbach to supervise the construction of a street between Lochhausen and Olching. The name Gröbenzell is derived from the local Gröbenbach. Thus the customs barrier and the creek can still be seen in the coat of arms. When the railway from Munich to Augsburg was built in 1840, peat cutters settled in the region. Gröbenzell predominantly remained a settlement for peat cutters until World War II. After the war, Gröbenzell grew fast since a lot of refugees moved to Munich and its suburbs. In 1952 the town Gröbenzell was officially founded by merging several districts of Munich, Puchheim, Olching and Geiselbullach to one community. Modern Gröbenzell really developed in the 1960s and 1970s with the EIWO settlement, which involved the building of approximately 250 townhomes. This and following settlements turned Gröbenzell into a suburb for Munich.

== Politics ==
State Election 2023

On October 8, 2023, Gröbenzell citizens voted for the following parties:

- CSU: 36.8%
- Grüne Partei: 23.1%
- FW: 10.5%
- SPD: 9.8%
- AFD: 7.3%
- FDP: 4.6%
- ÖDP: 1.7%
- dieBasis: 1.1%
- DIE LINKE: 1.0%
- DIE PARTEI: 1.0%
- Tierschutzpartei: 1.0%
- BP: 0.8%
- Volt: 0.8%
- PdH: 0.3%
- V-Partei^3: 0.3%

Voter Participation: 79.9%

== Population growth ==
Population Growth
Year	1939	1950	1961	1970	1987	1991	1995	2000	2005	2010	2015	2019
Population	2.743	5.283	6.946	11.386	17.504	18.317	18.418	18.830	19.202	19.512	19.780	20.048

== Commerce and infrastructure ==
Even though most of the residents go to work in Munich, there are several commercial and industrial businesses in the commercial area of Gröbenzell.

Gröbenzell is well connected to the regional and national traffic network by S-Bahn and Autobahn.

=== Commerce ===
In the eastern part of the municipality, between the railway line and the state road to Lochhausen, the Gröbenzell industrial estate was established. In addition to the usual supermarkets and discount stores, various crafts and small industrial enterprises can be found there.

In the town center around Kirchen- and Bahnhofsstraße, along with a supermarket and various drugstores, there are several bakeries and confectioneries. Pharmacies, opticians, fruit and vegetable vendors also complement the local offering of goods and services.

The bustling Friday weekly market on Rathausstraße, with a wide range of meat, fish, and sausage products as well as fruits, vegetables, flowers, cheese, bread, and other items, supplements the everyday range of goods.

=== Infrastructure ===
==== Road ====
Gröbenzell is connected to the federal motorway A8 via the exits Dachau/Fürstenfeldbruck or Lochhausen/Langwied, as well as to the A99 via the exit München-Lochhausen/Gröbenzell.

==== S-Bahn service ====
In public transportation, Gröbenzell is connected to the MunichMunich Transport and Tariff Association's S-Bahn network with its own stop on the S3 line (Mammendorf–Holzkirchen). The city center of Munich can be reached in approximately 20 minutes.

==== Railway connection ====
The railway line from Munich to Augsburg cuts through Gröbenzell from southeast to northwest. Until the early 1970s, both parts of the municipality were connected for general traffic via a level crossing extension of Kirchenstraße to Bahnhofstraße. Up until then, the town still had a freight station. As part of the redesign of the S-Bahn station, the connecting road between the north and south parts towards Munich was shifted via an underpass on Freyastraße. Subsequently, Kirchenstraße was converted into a one-way street along its entire length, and the southern part of Bahnhofstraße became a dead-end, both only applicable to motor vehicle traffic. Additionally, pedestrian and bicycle traffic can still cross the railway line at this location.

== Sports ==
The women's handball club HCD Gröbenzell played in the 2. Handball-Bundesliga during the 2017/18 Season.

The men's soccer club FC Grün-Weiß Gröbenzell is not currently in the German Bundesliga.

== Schools ==
Public Schools

Elementary Schools (Grundschule)

- Ährenfeldschule
- Grundschule an der Bernhard-Rößner-Straße
- Gröbenbachschule Gröbenzell

Middle and High Schools (Gymnasiums)

- Gymnasium Gröbenzell

Private Schools

- Rudolf Steiner-Schule Gröbenzell

== Notable people ==
=== Science and economics ===
- Rudolf Bayer (*1939), Ph.D., computer scientist, database pioneer, and inventor of B-trees, Professor Emeritus at the Technical University of Munich.
- Karl Eibl (1940–2014), literary scholar and emeritus professor at LMU Munich.
- Karl Larenz (1903–1993), legal scholar and full professor at LMU Munich.

=== Culture ===
- Monika Baumgartner (*1951), actress
- Hans Bergel (1925–2022), writer
- Martin Gregor-Dellin (1926–1988), writer
- Günter Mack (1930–2007), actor
- Volker Prechtel (1941–1997), theater, cinema, Hollywood (The Name of the Rose), and television actor
- Barbara Schöneberger (*1974), television presenter

=== Sports ===
- Hans Siegl (1944–1978), motorcycle track racing driver
- Marco Hiller (*1997), professional footballer

=== Politics ===
- Reinhold Bocklet (*1943), lawyer, former Bavarian State Minister for Nutrition, Agriculture, and Forestry, former member of the Bavarian State Parliament.
- Peter Glotz (1939–2005), publicist, scholar, and SPD politician.

== Twin towns ==
- Pilisvörösvár, Hungary, since 1990.
- Garches, France, since 1994.
