= Puchheim =

- Town
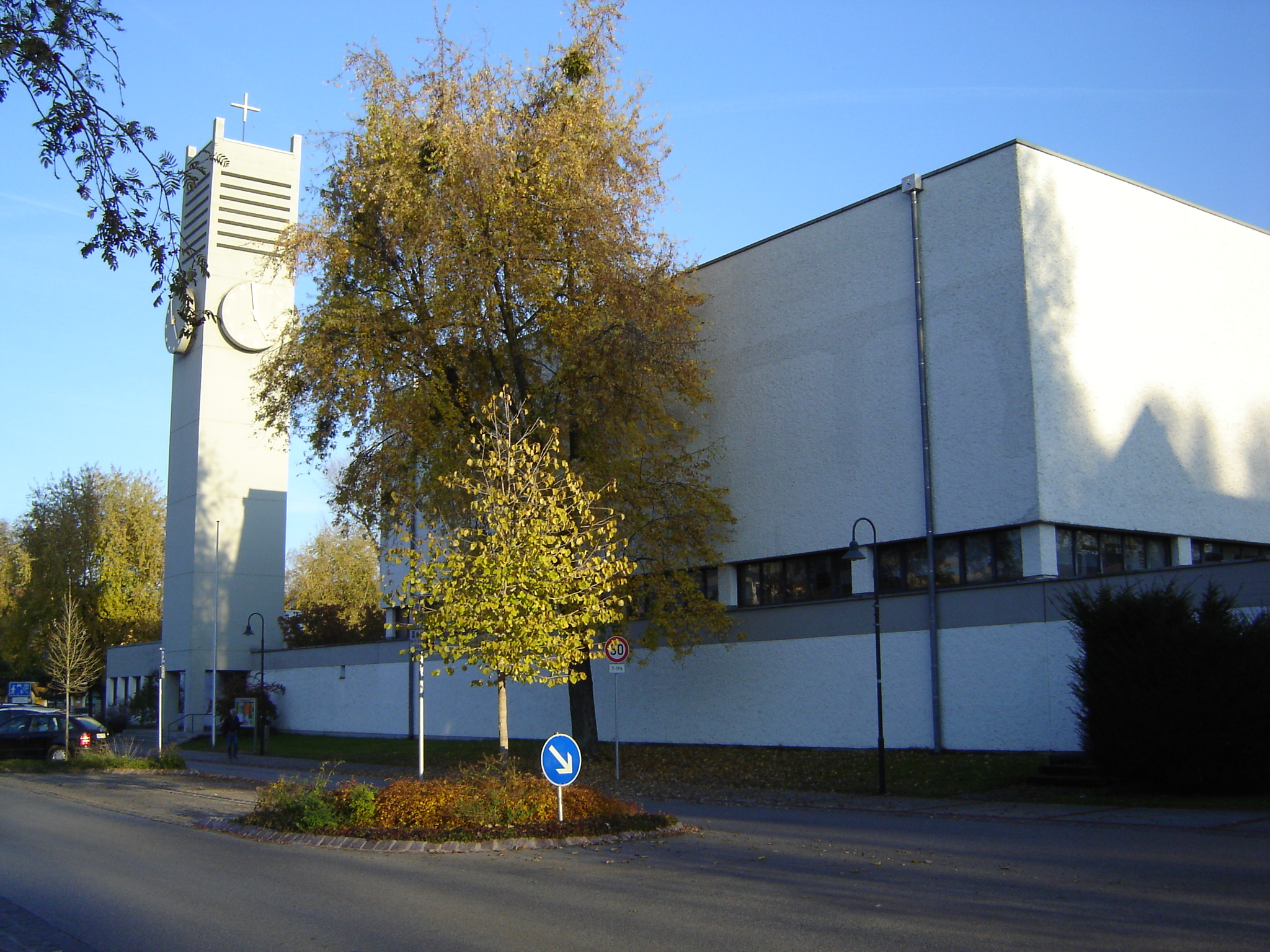
- Saint Joseph Church

- Coat of arms

- Location of Puchheim within Fürstenfeldbruck district
- Interactive map of Puchheim
- Location within Germany Location within Bavaria
- Coordinates: 48°09′N 11°21′E
- Country: Germany
- State: Bavaria
- Admin. region: Oberbayern
- District: Fürstenfeldbruck
- Subdivisions: 2 Ortsteile

Government
  - Mayor (2020–26): Norbert Seidl (SPD)

Area
  - Total: 12.24 km^{2} (4.73 sq mi)
- Elevation: 535 m (1,755 ft)

Population (2025-12-31)
  - Total: 20,896
  - Density: 1,707/km^{2} (4,422/sq mi)
- Time zone: UTC+01:00 (CET)
  - Summer (DST): UTC+02:00 (CEST)
- Postal codes: 82178
- Dialling codes: 089
- Vehicle registration: FFB
- Website: www.puchheim.de

Puchheim (German pronunciation: [ˈpuːxhaɪm]; Central Bavarian: Buachham) is a town in the district of Fürstenfeldbruck, in Bavaria, Germany, and a western suburb of Munich. It has about 21,000 inhabitants.

Puchheim is divided into two parts: the old, rural Puchheim-Ort and the newer Puchheim-Bahnhof, which grew up around the railway station opened in 1896. One of Germany's first airfields was laid out north of the station around 1910 and, during World War I, served as a prisoner-of-war camp; the surrounding moorland was later drained by the prisoners so that houses could be built.

Puchheim-Ort, the old part of the town, was first recorded as Puohheim in the church records of Freising around 948–957, roughly two centuries before the founding of Munich.

== Geography ==
The wooded Parsberg lies within the municipality, above the Germeringer See. A medieval Burgstall once stood on its summit; excavated in 1993, the earthwork has been dated to the 12th century.

== Transport ==
Puchheim is well connected to the regional and national traffic network by S-Bahn (S4) and Autobahn (A 8, A 99).

== Twin towns – sister cities ==
Puchheim is twinned with:

- Attnang-Puchheim, Austria
- Nagykanizsa, Hungary
- Salo, Finland
- Zalakaros, Hungary
