= Transport in the Netherlands =

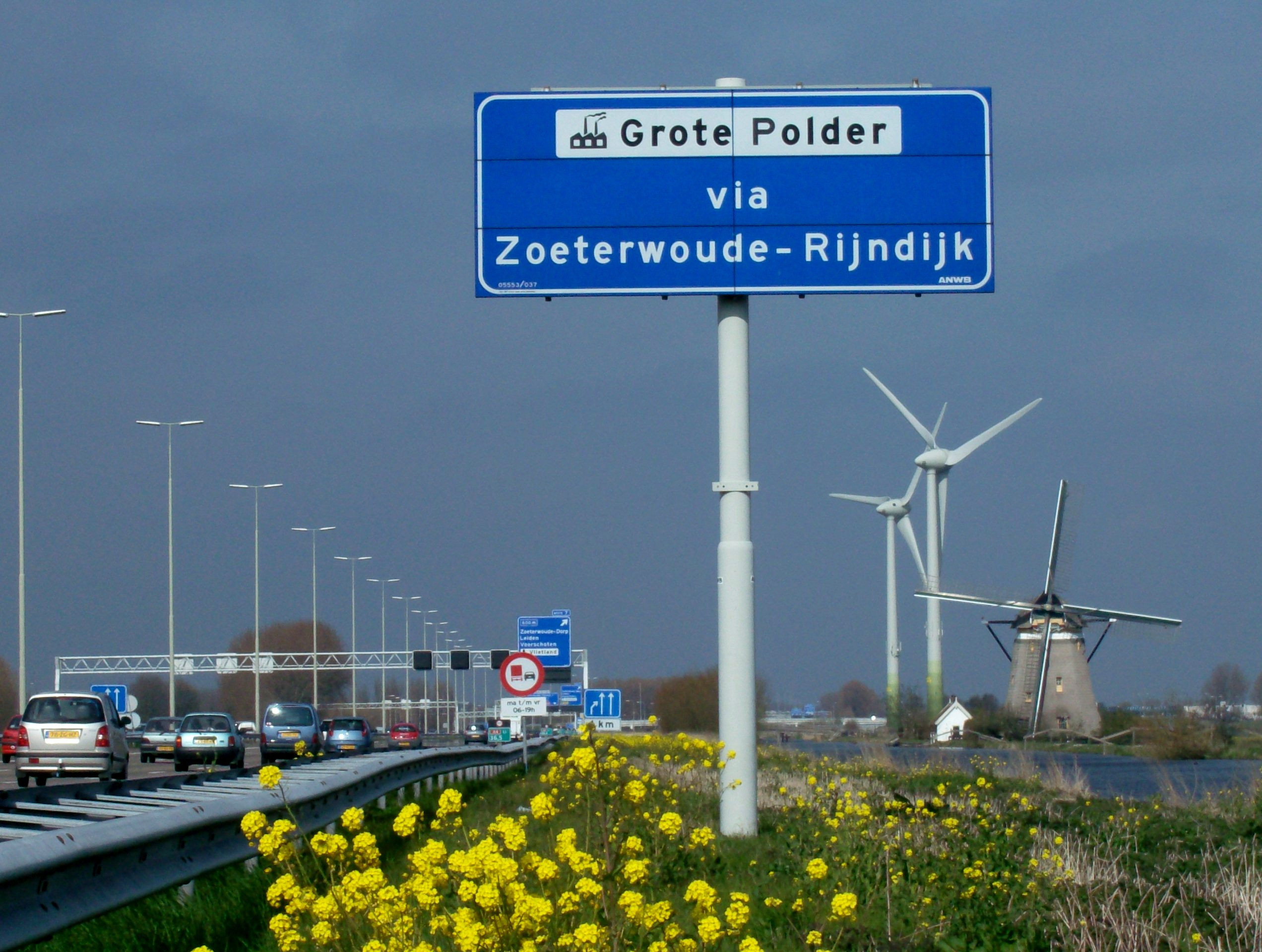
Traffic in the Netherlands

The Netherlands is both a very densely populated and a highly developed country in which transport is a key factor of the economy. Correspondingly it has a very dense and modern infrastructure, facilitating transport with road, rail, air and water networks. In its Global Competitiveness Report for 2014-2015, the World Economic Forum ranked the Dutch transport infrastructure fourth in the world.

With a total road network of 139,000 km, including 3,530 km of expressways, the Netherlands has one of the densest road networks in the world; much denser than Germany and France, though not as dense as Belgium. The Dutch also have a well developed railway network, that connects most towns and cities, as well as a comprehensive dedicated cycling infrastructure, featuring some 35,000 km of track physically segregated from motorised traffic.

The port of Rotterdam is the world's largest seaport outside East Asia, and the largest port of Europe. (Note: The Rotterdam mainport is about as big as Europe's 2nd and 3rd biggest ports combined, handling roughly the total cargo tonnage as those of Antwerp plus Hamburg respectively.) It connects with its hinterland in Germany, Switzerland and France through the rivers Rhine and Meuse. Two thirds of all inland water freight shipping within the EU, and 40% of containers, pass through the Netherlands. Additionally, the port of Amsterdam is Europe's fifth busiest seaport, according to Eurostat.

Mobility in the Netherlands is considerable. On the roads it has grown continuously since the 1950s and now exceeds 200 billion km travelled per year, three quarters of which are done by car. Around half of all trips in the Netherlands are made by car, 25% by bicycle, 20% walking, and 5% by public transport. Additionally, Dutch airports handled at least 70 million passengers in 2016. Excluding air travel, the Dutch journey more than 30 km a day on average, which takes them just over an hour.

In 2010, 1.65 billion tons of goods traffic was registered, half of which moved by sea and inland shipping, and 40% by road transport. The remainder was mostly by pipelines; rail transport only handles 2% of freight movements through the Netherlands.

== Road transport ==
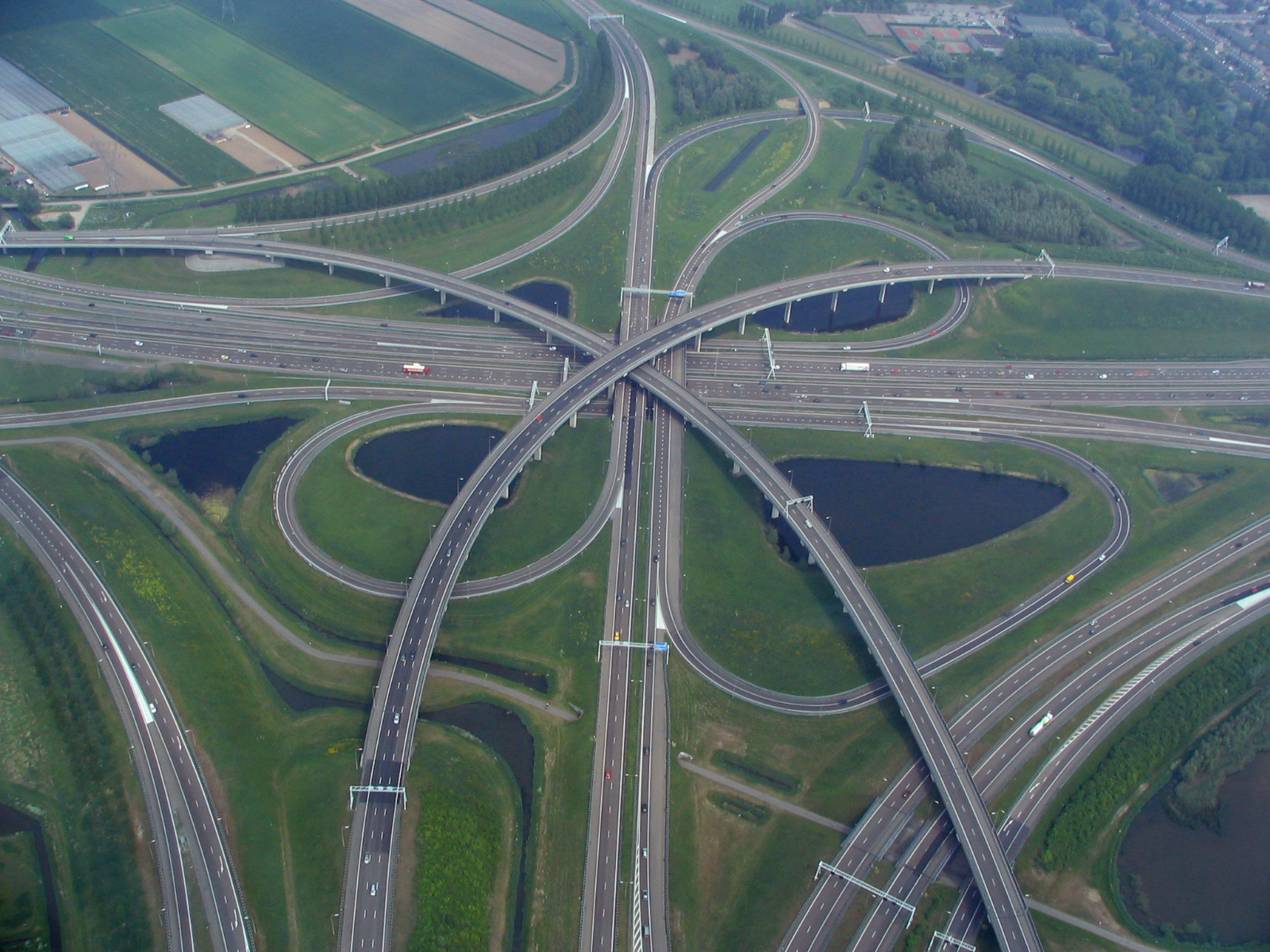
The north (and largest) section of the Ridderkerk interchange

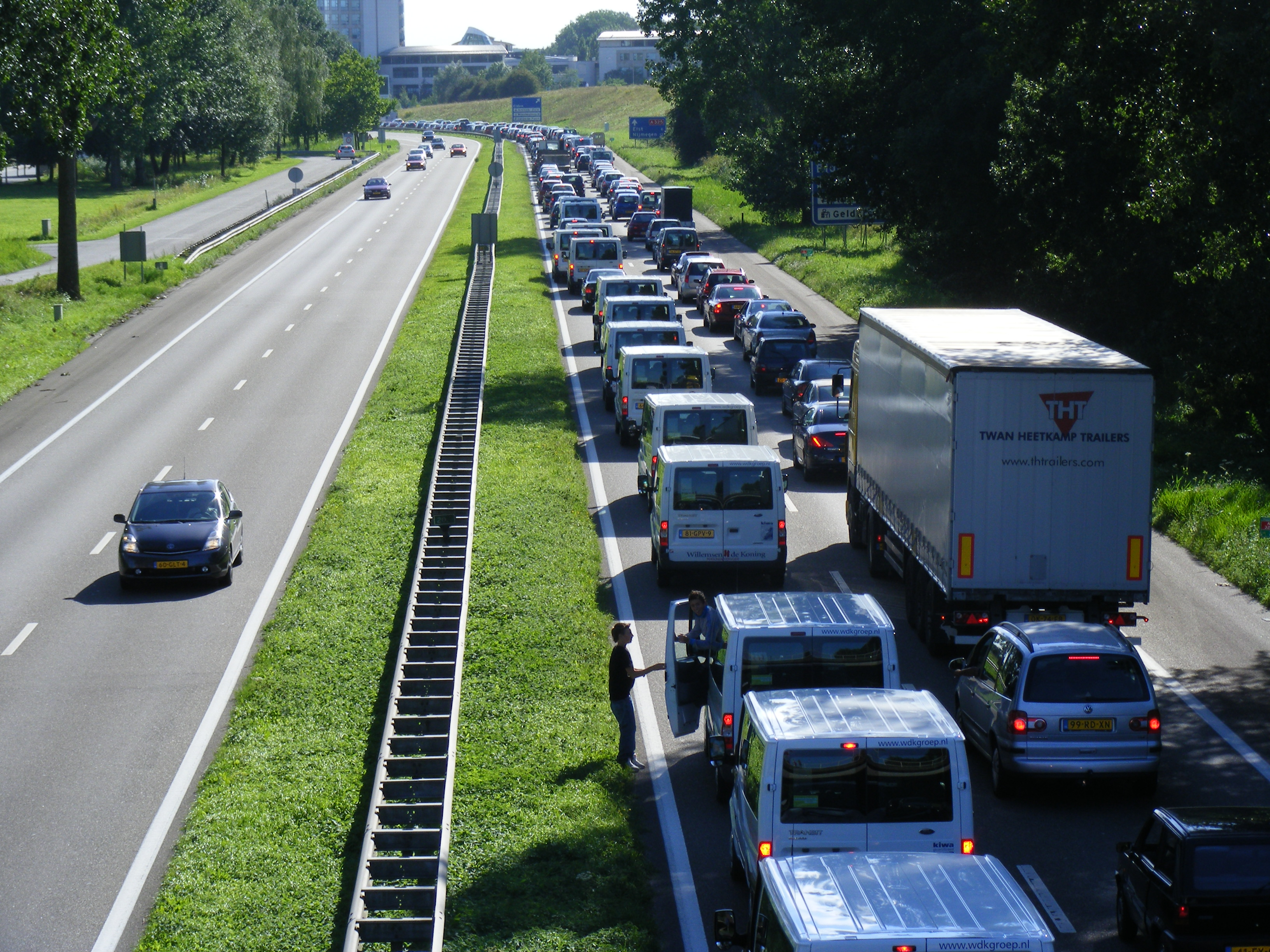
Traffic jam on the A325 (Arnhem)

With 139,000 km of public roads, the Netherlands has one of the densest road networks in the world - much denser than Germany and France, but still not as dense as Belgium. (Note: Japan has the same per country road density, but the Netherlands' area includes 18.4% inland water, compared to 0.8% for Japan.) In 2013, 5,191 km were national roads, 7,778 km were provincial roads, and 125,230 km were municipality and other roads.

Dutch roads include 3,530 km of motorways and expressways, and with a motorway density of 64 kilometres per 1,000 km², the country also has one of the densest motorway networks in the world. The Netherlands' main highway network (hoofdwegennet) - comparable to Britain's network of trunk roads - consists of most of its 5,200 km of national roads, supplemented with the most prominent provincial roads. Although only about 2,500 km are fully constructed to motorway standards, much of the remainder are also expressways for fast motor vehicles only.

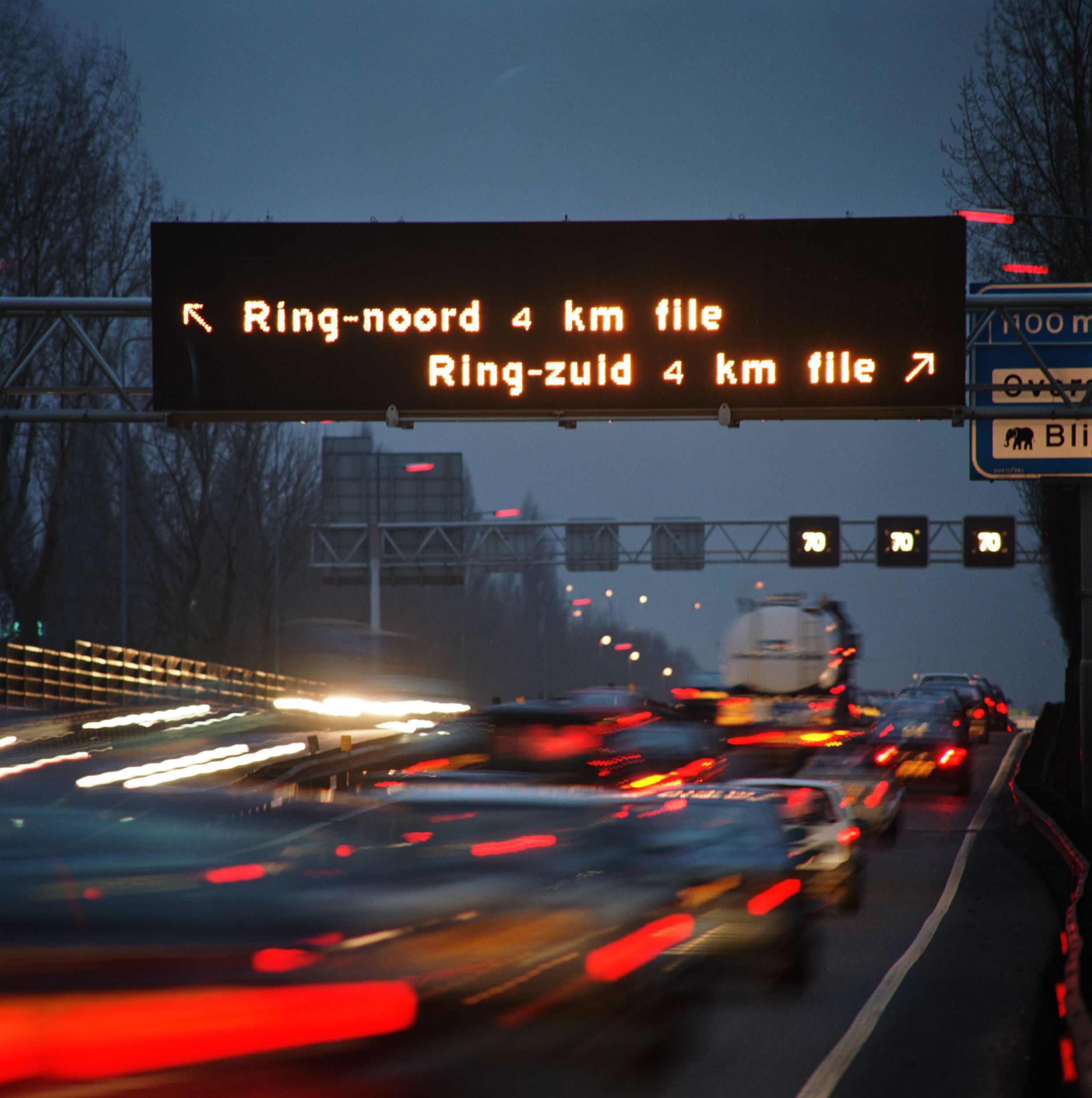
Dynamic Route Information Panel (DRIP) on the A13

Mobility on Dutch roads has grown continuously since the 1950s and now exceeds 200 billion km travelled per year, three quarters of which are done by car, meaning that while Dutch roads are numerous, they are also used more intensely than in almost any other country. Car ownership in the Netherlands is high but not exceptional, and slightly lower than in surrounding countries. Goods vehicles account for 20% of total traffic.

The busiest Dutch motorway is the A13 between The Hague and Rotterdam, with a traffic volume of 140,000 motor vehicles per day. The widest Dutch motorway is the A15/A16 just south of Rotterdam with 16 lanes in a 4+4+4+4 setup.

Traffic congestion is common in the Netherlands. The high population density generates significant traffic volumes on both motorways and regular highways. Most congestion occurs in the Randstad, but congestion is a daily structural problem around many larger cities. The Netherlands tries to counter this with an advanced motorway network, with Variable Message Signs and electronic signalization across most of the network. The number of passing motor vehicles is counted every minute of the day at some 20,000 measuring stations on the Dutch motorway network. A special feature of the motorways is the use of Porous Asphalt Concrete, which reduces noise levels and allows rainwater to be drained efficiently for safety and expedient traffic flow under precipitation.

== Cycling ==
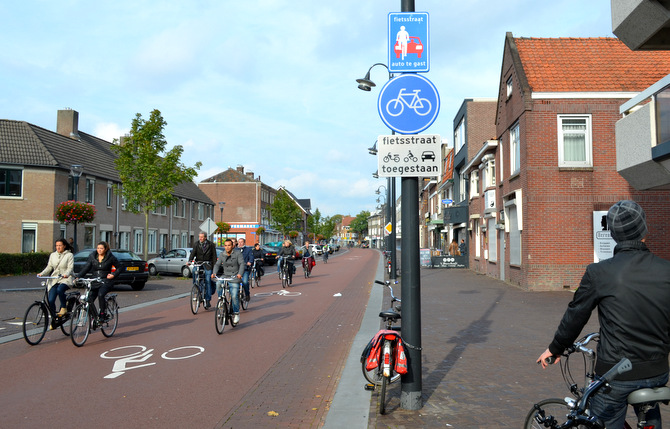
A fietsstraat (cycle street) where cyclists have priority and cars are "guests" and must yield.

Cycling is a ubiquitous mode of transport in the Netherlands. 27% of all trips are by bicycle - the highest modal share of any country in the world. Moreover: 36% of the Dutch list the bike as their most frequent mode of transport on a typical day. (Note: Up from 31% naming the bike their main mode of transport for daily activities in 2011.) Some 85% of the people own at least one bicycle. All in all the Dutch are estimated to have at least 18 million functioning bikes [21][22], which makes more than one per capita, and much more than the 11.3 million motor vehicles registered on the road. Almost as many passenger kilometres are covered by bicycle as by train.

Cycling infrastructure is comprehensive, and public policy, urban planning & laws are bike-friendly. Most roads except for motorways support cyclists, and bikeways are clearly signposted, well maintained and well lit. Dedicated cycle tracks are common on busy roads - some 35,000 km of track has been physically segregated from motor traffic, equal to a quarter of the country's entire road network. Busy junctions often prioritize cyclists, or they are equipped with cycle-specific traffic lights.

There are large bicycle parking facilities, particularly in city centres and at train stations. Since the start of the 21st century, parking spaces for 450,000 bicycles were built and modernized at over 400 train stations, and Dutch railways organizations ProRail and NS are calling for an expansion by another 250,000 by 2027. Already half of all Dutch train travelers cycle to the railway station, amounting to half a million cyclists daily.

In 2013, the European Cyclists' Federation ranked the Netherlands, together with Denmark as the most bike-friendly country in Europe.

== Rail transport ==
Railway network for public transport in the Netherlands

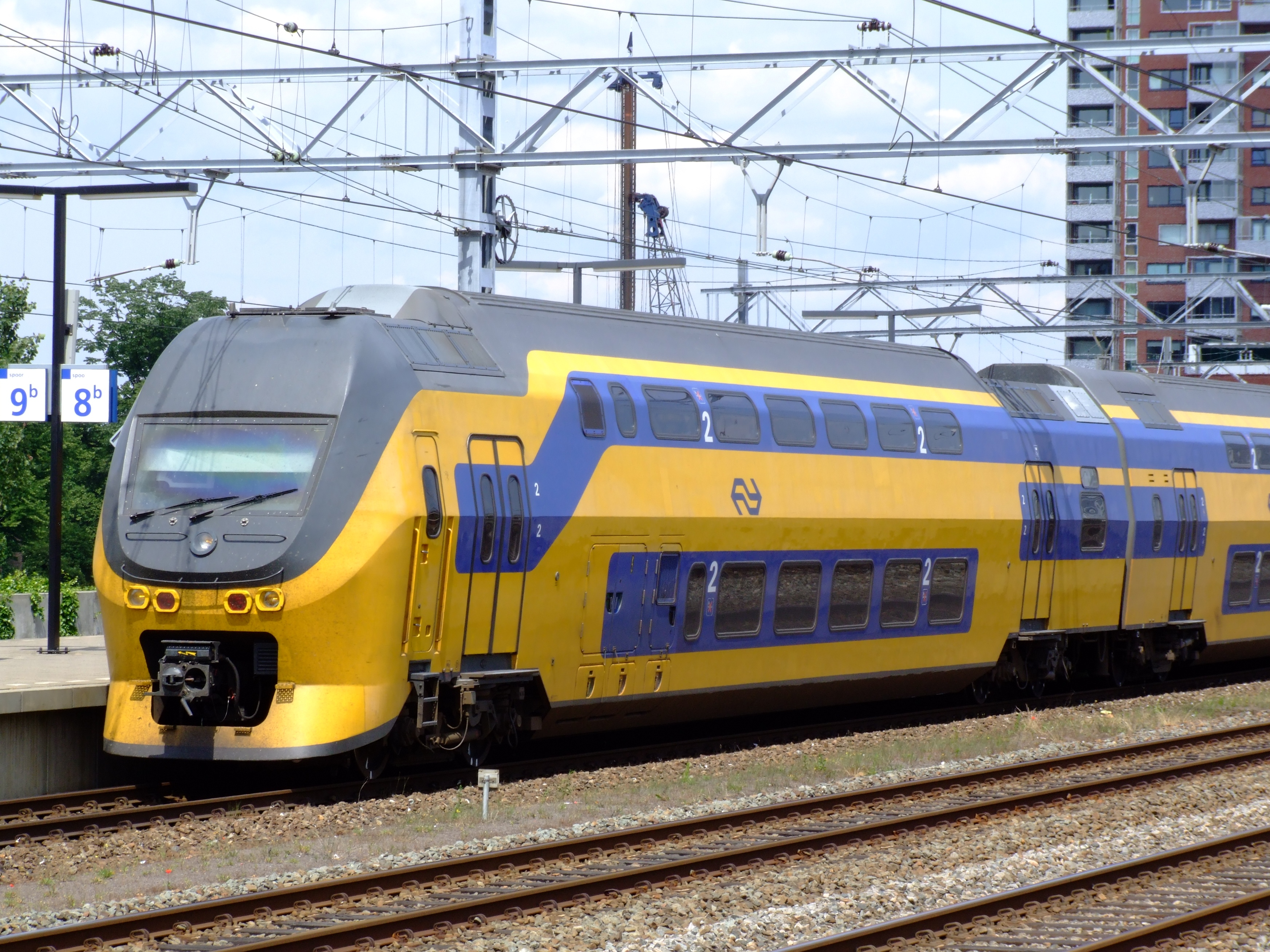
Many trains are double-deckers

Most distance travelled on Dutch public transport goes by rail. Like many other European countries, the Netherlands has a dense railway network, totalling between 7,021 kilometres (4,363 mi) and 7,300 kilometres (4,500 mi) of track, or 3,013 route km, three quarters of which has been electrified. The network is mostly focused on passenger transport and connects almost all major towns and cities, counting just over 400 train stations, more than there are municipalities in the Netherlands. The national rail infrastructure is managed by public task company ProRail, and a number of different operators have concessions to run their trains. ProRail also coordinates the totality of scheduling and proper meshing of the Dutch railway services.

Public passenger rail transport is operated mainly by Nederlandse Spoorwegen (NS) (Dutch Railways); minor parts by Arriva, Keolis Nederland, Qbuzz, DB Regio, NMBS and DB Regionalbahn Westfalen. During week days all railway stations are serviced at least twice an hour in each direction. (Note: On 14 December 2014 a revised railway timetable was implemented in the Netherlands, providing half-hour service to every station served by the NS in the country.) Large parts of the network are serviced by two to four trains per hour on average. Heavily used routes can be serviced by 8 to 16 trains an hour.

In recent years, the four largest railway stations in the Netherlands, the central stations of each of the largest cities: Amsterdam, Rotterdam, The Hague and Utrecht, have all entered into major reconstruction and expansion. Rotterdam Central station was completely rebuilt, and was the first to complete, reopening in March 2014. The Hague Central station and Utrecht Central station were reopened, after extensive reconstructions, in February and December 2016, respectively. Amsterdam Central station has been undergoing a string of reconstruction works that started in 1997, and is yet to complete.

In 2015 a consultancy comparison of Europe's railway systems found the Dutch network the most cost effective for its performance, together with Finland's. Per kilometre of track, the Dutch rail network is the busiest in the European Union, handling over a million passengers a day. For 2019 some 2.2 million train journeys are scheduled to travel a record number of 165 million train kilometres (103 million train miles) — a growth of 28%, up from 124 million km in 2004. Until 2030 ProRail projects a further growth of passenger kilometres by another 45 percent. For 2019, also 8 percent more freight trains are scheduled than in 2018.

=== Future developments ===
On the initiative of two European parties: RailNetEurope and Forum Train Europe, a project called "Redesign of the International Timetabling Process (TTR)" should help to harmonise planning freight- and passenger trains across Europe, to optimize usage of existing rail tracks. Currently, almost all freight trains (96%) deviate from their original schedule, due to the dynamic nature of cargo transport. The new TTR must facilitate ProRail to let unscheduled freight trains run more easily, without requiring complex shifting in the regular passenger train timetables. As of 2020, timetables will be detailed to tenths of minutes (six second units), instead of whole minutes, to further optimise planning.

In the long term, significant capacity gains could only be achieved by adding more rail tracks, or transforming large portions of the Dutch railway system to run more like a metro / subway system, which could support up to 24 to 30 trains per hour on the busiest lines. This would however require a structural disentanglement of the current situation, in which trains, train drivers and conductors all have their own work schedules, following the Japanese model. However, at the moment there are no real plans for such steps.

== Public transport ==
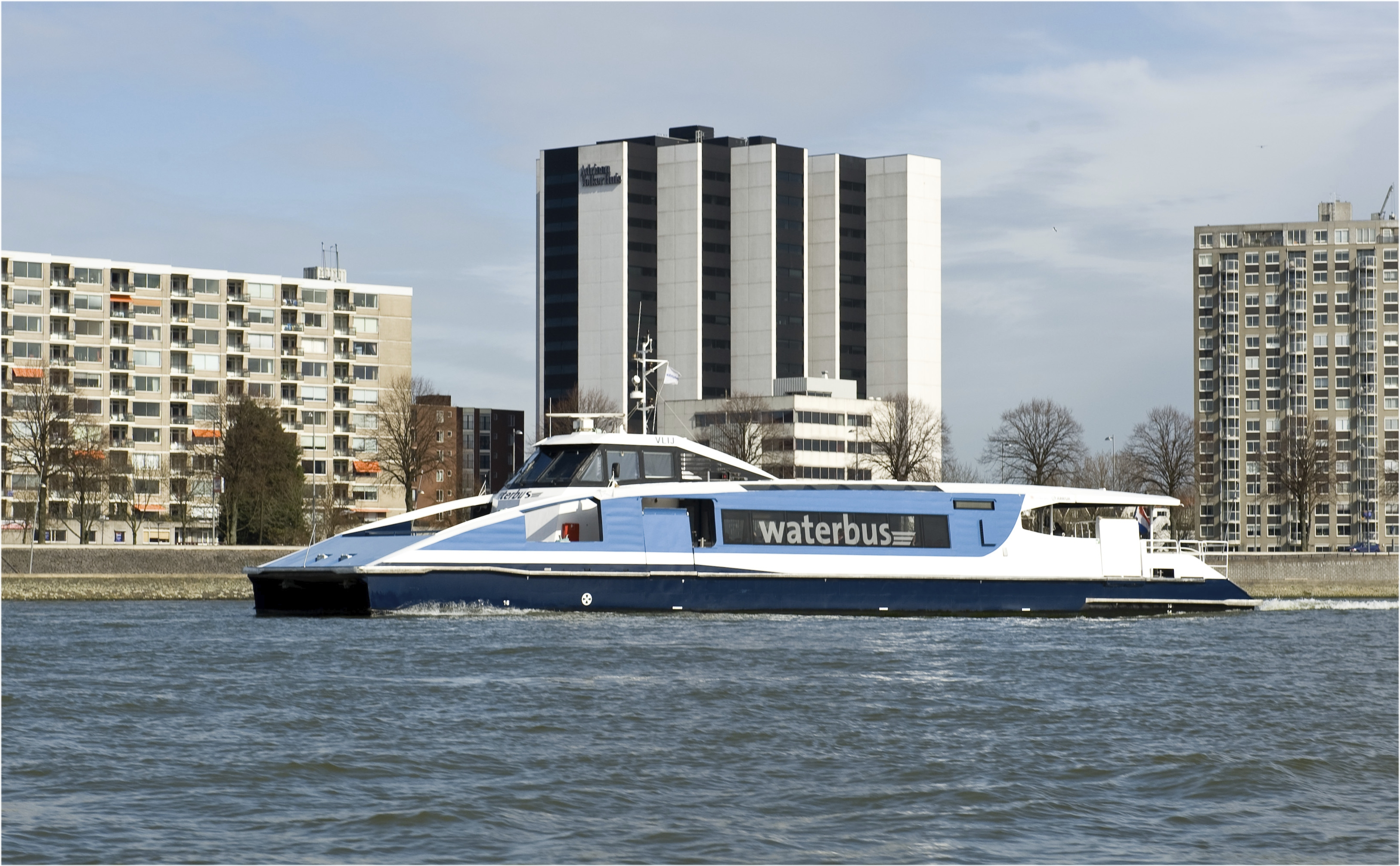
A waterbus connects Rotterdam to some towns to its south-east

For longer distances the main public transport in the Netherlands is the train. Long-distance buses are limited to a few missing railway connections. Regional and rural public transport, serving small(er) towns is by bus. Local and urban public transport is also generally by bus, but the three largest cities (Amsterdam, Rotterdam and The Hague) all have extensive tram systems, that in each case also connect with adjacent cities in their respective urban agglomerations. (Note: There were many more town tram systems in the past, but most shut down before or just after WW II.)

In addition, Amsterdam and Rotterdam also have several metro lines. Amsterdam's subway was expanded by a new "North-South" line in July 2018, after 15 years of construction, costing €3.1 billion.

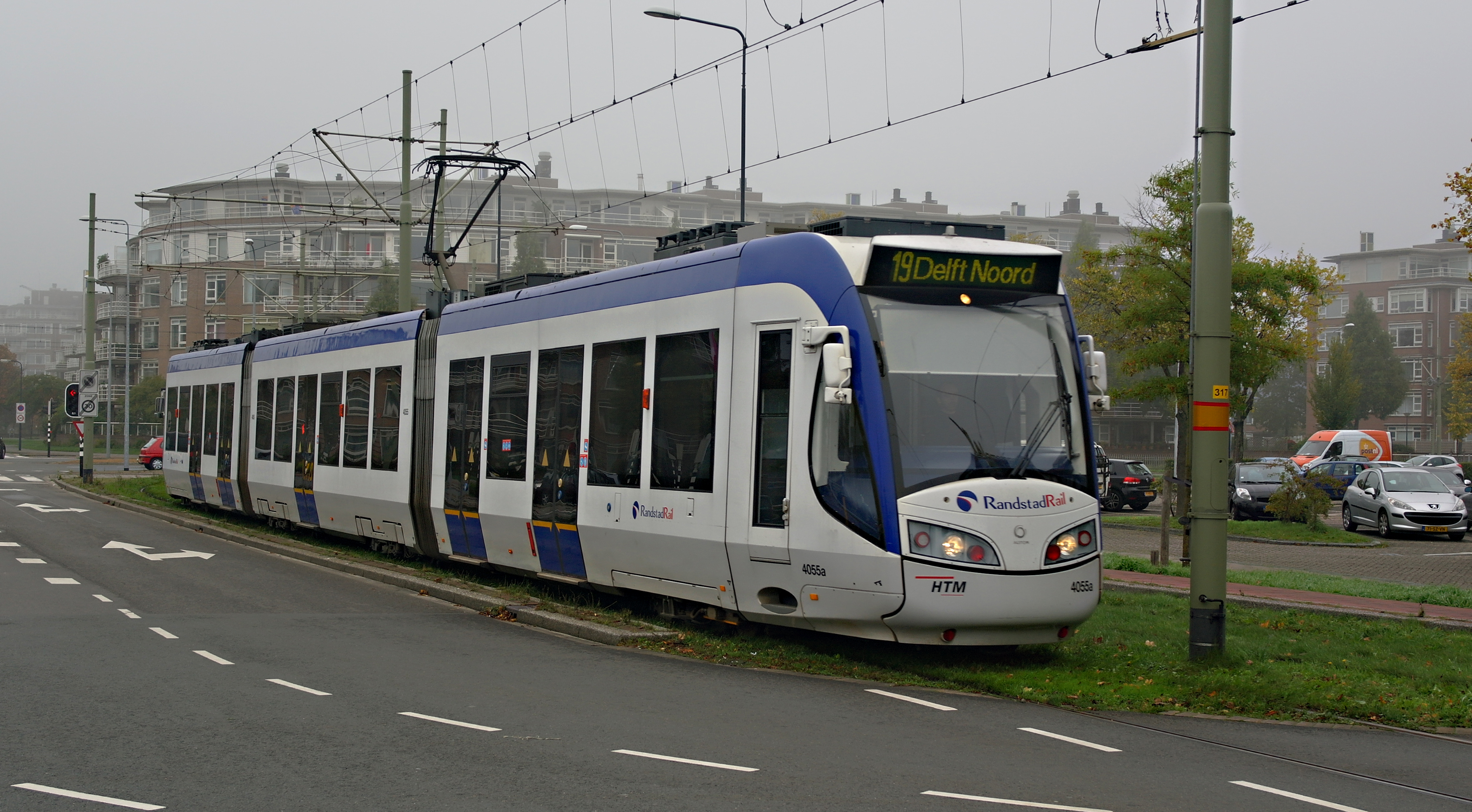
RandstadRail light rail near Delft

Additionally, Rotterdam, The Hague and suburbs in between are connected by a light rail system called RandstadRail, and one line of the Rotterdam metro system connects all the way to The Hague Central station. Utrecht has its own light rail system, called fast tram, connecting the city with adjacent Nieuwegein and IJsselstein. Arnhem is the only Dutch city that still operates a trolleybus system.

Due to the large number of waterways in the Netherlands, not every road connection has been bridged, and there are still some ferries in operation. In the Rotterdam and -Drecht towns region, a water bus public transport service operates as well.

Public transport operators are both the public transport companies run by the local government of the cities: GVB (Amsterdam), RET (Rotterdam) and HTM (The Hague), as well as private enterprise companies like Arriva, Connexxion, Qbuzz and Keolis Nederland.

== Air travel ==
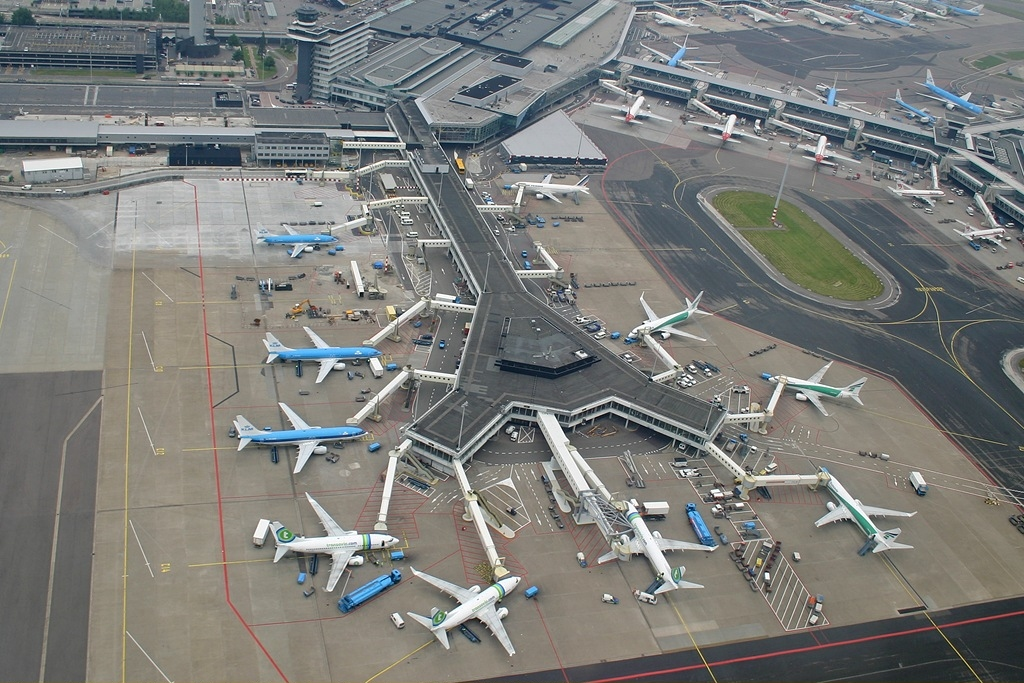
Partial aerial view of Schiphol airport

Air travel in the Netherlands peaked at a Dutch record number of over 81 million passengers in 2019.

Amsterdam Schiphol Airport, located 9 km (5.6 mi) southwest of Amsterdam, is the main international airport in the Netherlands, and the third busiest airport in Europe in terms of passengers. Offering direct flights to 326 destination airports around the planet, Schiphol is the world's second best connected airport. The airport handled 63.6 million passengers in 2016, a growth of 9.1% over 2015, peaking at 71.7 million passengers in 2019. Airfreight tonnage increased by 1.8% to 1.7 million metric tons.

Opened in 1916 as a military airbase, Schiphol saw 479,000 flights in 2016, and practically hit its environmentally mandated maximum of 500,000 yearly flight operations the year prior, recording 499,000 take-offs and landings in 2018. This makes Schiphol one of the world's busiest airports, on average handling 57 starts and landings per hour on one of its six runways, and thus frequently exceeding levels of over one aircraft movement per minute.

Schiphol is the primary hub for Dutch flag carrier airline KLM and its regional affiliate KLM Cityhopper, as well as for other Dutch airlines Corendon Dutch Airlines, Martinair, Transavia and TUI Airlines Netherlands. (Note: formerly Arkefly and shortened to Arke in the corporate design to match the travel agency)) The airport also serves as a European hub for Delta Air Lines, and as a base for EasyJet and Vueling airlines.

In other regions there are much smaller international airports, the most prominent being Eindhoven Airport, Rotterdam The Hague Airport, Maastricht Aachen Airport and Groningen Airport. The airports of Eindhoven and Rotterdam/The Hague are both part of the Schiphol Group, and both experienced growth in 2016. Eindhoven Airport grew by 9.3% to 4.7 million passengers, whereas Rotterdam/The Hague Airport's growth was a modest 0.2%, reaching 1.6 million travellers in 2016. At the Maastricht Aachen, and Groningen airports, a considerable share of flights is seasonal in nature. For transport within the country, air travel is hardly used.

The airports of the Netherlands handled 71 million air passengers in 2023. In the previous years Dutch airports handled 61 million air passengers in 2022, 29 million in 2021, and 23.6 million in 2020.

In 2015 Dutch airports handled passengers at a ratio of 47 million on European flights versus 18 million on intercontinental flights, and in 2013 a slightly less 1.6 million metric tons of airfreight.

== Water transport ==
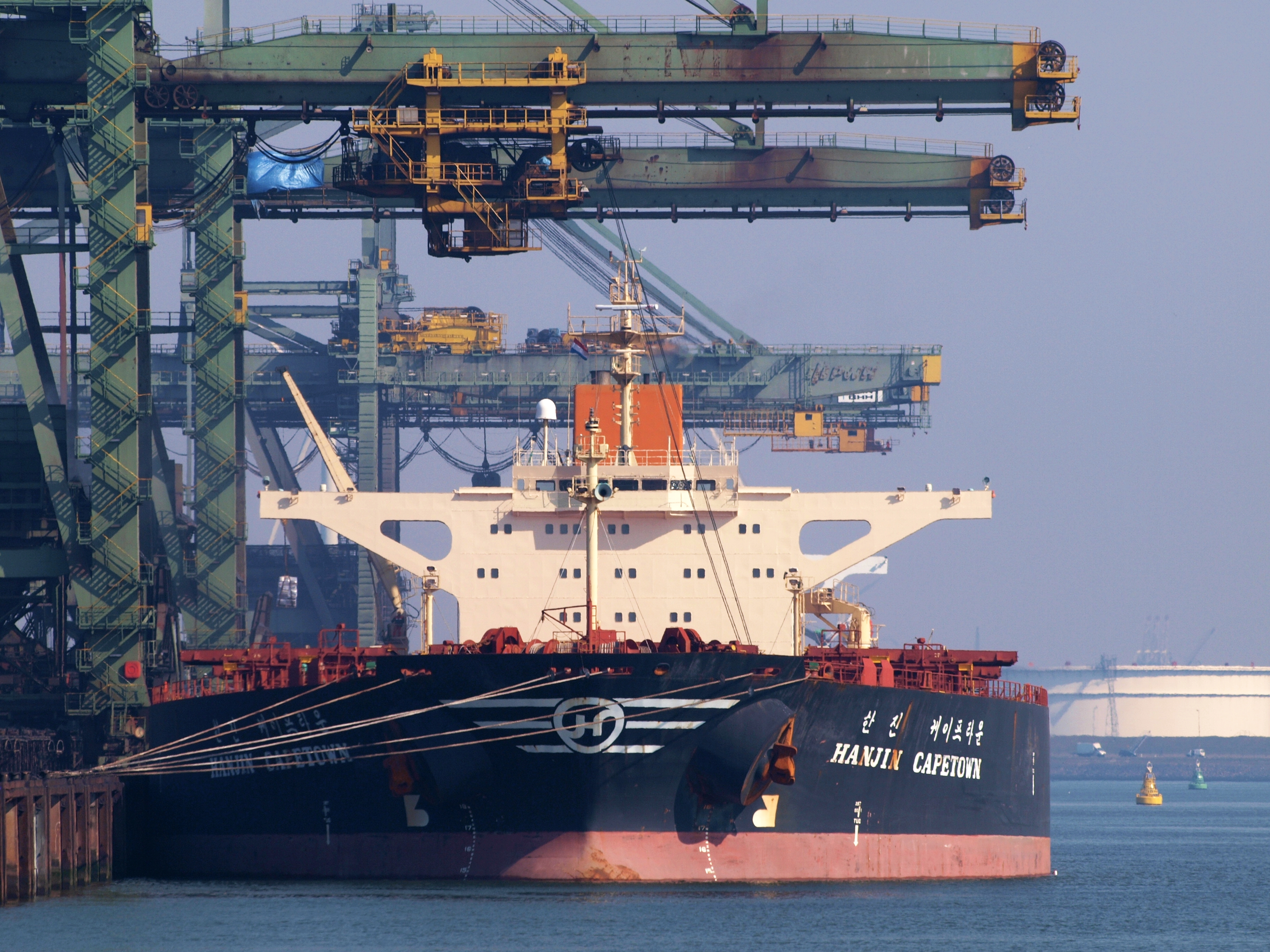
Bulk carrier in the Rotterdam port

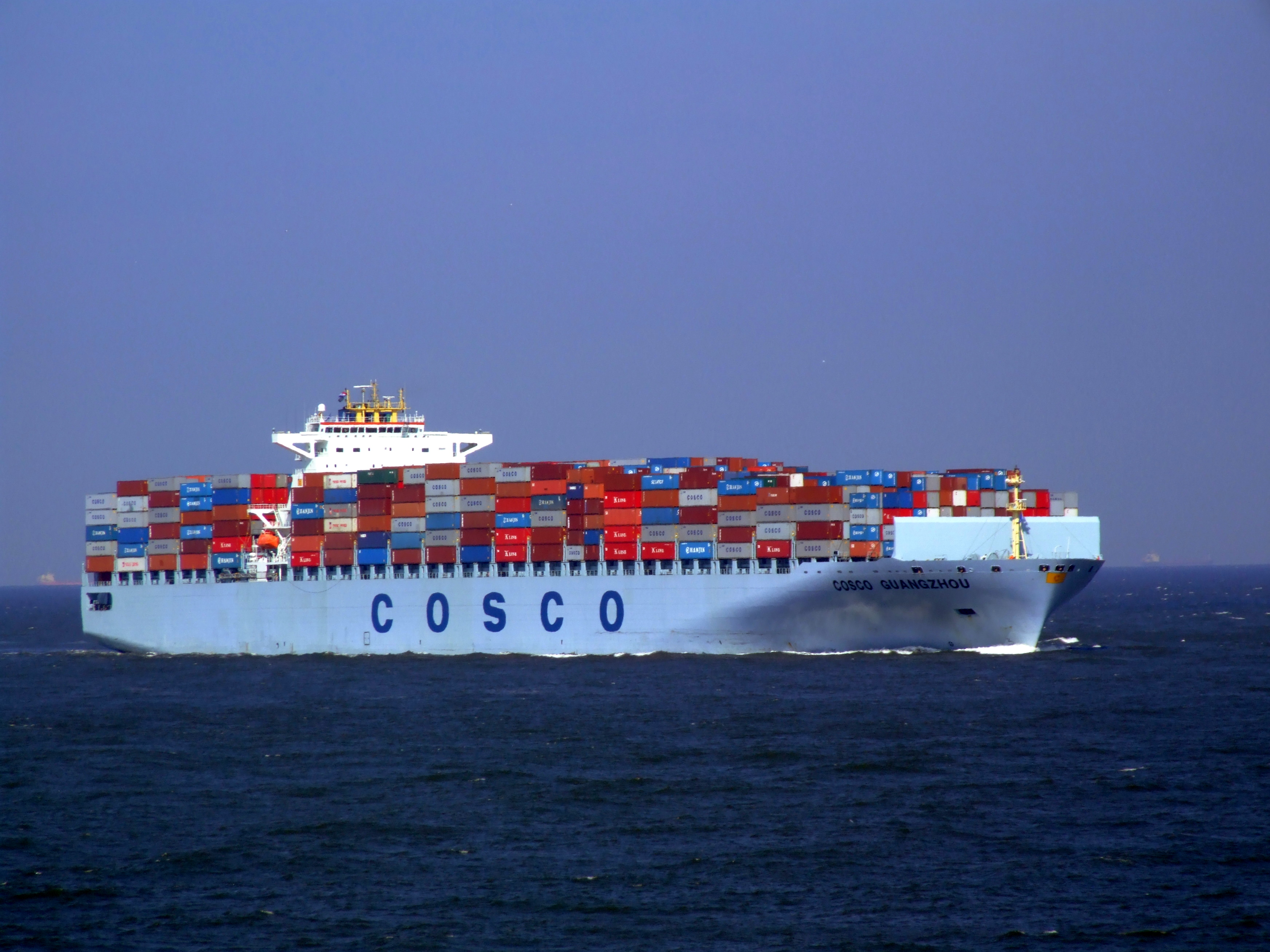
Container ship approaching Rotterdam port

=== Ports and harbours ===
The Netherlands has thirteen seaports, three of which have international significance. Handling 440 million metric tons of cargo in 2013, the port of Rotterdam is the biggest port of Europe – as big as the next three biggest combined, and the eighth largest in the world. The Amsterdam seaport is the second in the country, and the fifth largest in Europe. Additionally, since 1998 the ports of Vlissingen and Terneuzen are working as one, under the name of Zeeland Seaports. Handling 34 million metric tons of cargo in 2012, this is now the third biggest Dutch seaport. For comparison: the nearby port of London handled 44 million tons in that year.

Through the rivers Rhine and Meuse, Rotterdam has excellent access to its hinterland upstream, reaching to Germany, France and Switzerland. The port's main activities are petrochemical industries and general cargo handling and transshipment. The harbour functions as an important transit point for bulk materials and between the European continent and overseas. From Rotterdam goods are transported by ship, river barge, train or road. In 2007, the Betuweroute, a new fast freight railway from Rotterdam to Germany, was completed.

Three Dutch ports are deepwater ports, that can handle fully laden Panamax ships: Rotterdam, Zeeland Seaports and the port of IJmuiden. Besides Rotterdam, Amsterdam and Zeeland, the ports of Moerdijk and Vlaardingen also support container liner shipping. Other notable port cities are Dordrecht, Haarlem and Den Helder, as well as Groningen, which controls the seaports of Delfzijl and Eemshaven. Den Helder is home to the Netherlands' main naval base.

=== Merchant marine ===
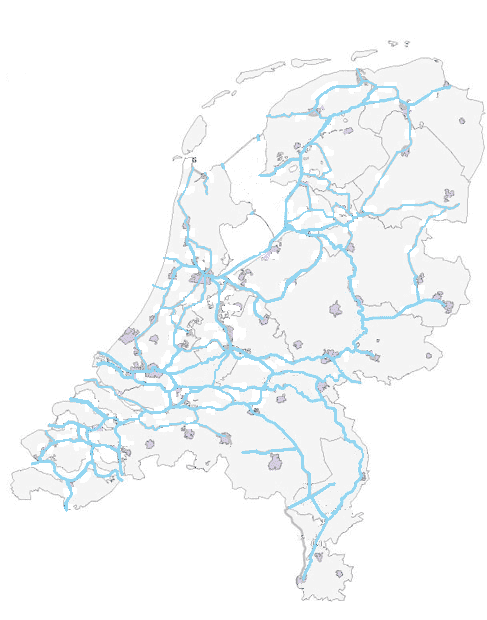
Waterways in the Netherlands

- Total: 563 ships (1,000 GT or over) totaling 4,035,899 GT/4,576,841 tonnes deadweight (DWT)
- Ships by type: bulk 3, cargo 343, chemical tanker 41, combination bulk 2, container 56, liquified gas 20, livestock carrier 1, multi-functional large load carrier 8, passenger 8, petroleum tanker 25, refrigerated cargo 32, roll-on/roll-off 16, short-sea passenger 3, specialized tanker 5 (1999 est.)

note: many Dutch-owned ships are also operating under the ship registry of Netherlands Antilles (1998 est.)

=== Inland waters ===
6,237 km of rivers and canals are navigable for ships of 50 tons. Some 3,740 km of this consists of canals. At least 4,326 km of waterways are usable by craft up to 400 metric ton capacity, and over 3,000 km are usable by ships up to 1,250 metric ton capacity. Although another source states that all of 6,230 km is navigable for craft up to 400 tons, and over 4,000 km is usable by ships up to 1,500 metric ton capacity.

The Dutch inland shipping fleet is the biggest in Europe. Consisting of some 7,000 vessels, it takes a share of 35% of the national total annual freight transport, and as much as 80% of bulk transport. Also two thirds of all inland water freight transports within the EU, and 40% of the EU's inland container shipping, pass through the Netherlands. All in all the Netherlands has so many waterways that virtually all major industrial areas and population centres can be reached by water via inland ports (200) and transhipment terminals (350).

== Pipelines ==
Pipeline transport:

- Crude oil: 418 km
- Petroleum products: 965 km

The distribution network for natural gas is the most dense in Europe and of very high quality, with a total length of 12,200 kilometres of transmission pipelines and 136,400 kilometres of distribution pipelines. A technical investigation has concluded that the existing Dutch high-pressure gas infrastructure could feasibly be converted for transport of hydrogen in the future.

The Netherlands has a well-developed pipeline network essential for transporting natural gas, oil, chemicals, and CO_{2}. Natural gas transmission network is managed by Gasunie Transport Services (GTS), it connects gas producers, storage facilities, and major consumers across the country. The network is divided into two main systems, catering to different types of gas. The low-calorific gas system primarily supplies households, while the high-calorific gas system serves industries and power plants.

Oil pipelines transport crude oil from the Port of Rotterdam to refineries in the Netherlands, Belgium, and Germany. Pernis Chemical Complex is interconnected by pipelines transporting various chemical feedstocks and products between different industrial facilities. In addition, Organic CO_{2} for Assimilation by Plants (OCAP) is a notable CO_{2} transport system that supplies purified CO_{2} from industrial sources to greenhouses in the Westland area for enhancing plant growth.

== Government ==
Transport in the Netherlands falls under the Ministry of Infrastructure and Water Management. With regard to public transport, not involving national rail, a total of 14 public bodies have been delegated the authority to grant concessions to public transport operators, namely the twelve provinces, plus the two transport-regions specifically for Amsterdam and Rotterdam / The Hague. These 14 parties are united in a cooperation called "DOVA" (Decentrale Openbaar Vervoer Autoriteiten), or "Decentralised Public Transport Authorities". The provinces in turn sometimes delegate this authority to their municipalities.

Roads are controlled by authorities at all four administrative levels in the Netherlands. About 5,200 km of national roads (Rijkswegen) are controlled by central national government agency Rijkswaterstaat, and the country's twelve provinces manage about 7,800 km of provincial roads. Most motorways are national roads, and the remaining national roads are mostly expressways. Only a few motorways are provincial ones, and they are much shorter and serve mostly regional traffic. Frequently, they were previously national roads.

Municipal roads make up the bulk of the network, totalling some 120,000 km. They are mostly local roads. Aside from the division in provinces, the Netherlands is also divided in 21 water management boards. Together with miscellaneous authorities, they own and control another 7,500 km of roads. For some roads, it is because they are a physical element of water barriers, like dikes and dams while others provide primary access to critical water control structures and may not be open to the public.

== Economics ==
Although transport economics is much more than just the economy of the transport sector itself, the latter is much easier to quantify. In 2012 the Dutch goods transport and storage sectors by themselves accounted for almost 400,000 full-time jobs, employing some 500,000 people. Gross revenues totalled 77 billion euro, leading to results of 4.3 billion euro.

== See also ==
- Transport in Europe
  - Transport in Belgium
  - Transport in Germany
- Transport in the Netherlands Antilles
- Rail transport in the Netherlands
- Road transport in the Netherlands
- Cycling in the Netherlands
- Canals in the Netherlands
- List of rivers of the Netherlands
