= Westhausen station =

Railway station in the municipality of Westhausen (Ostalb)

Westhausen
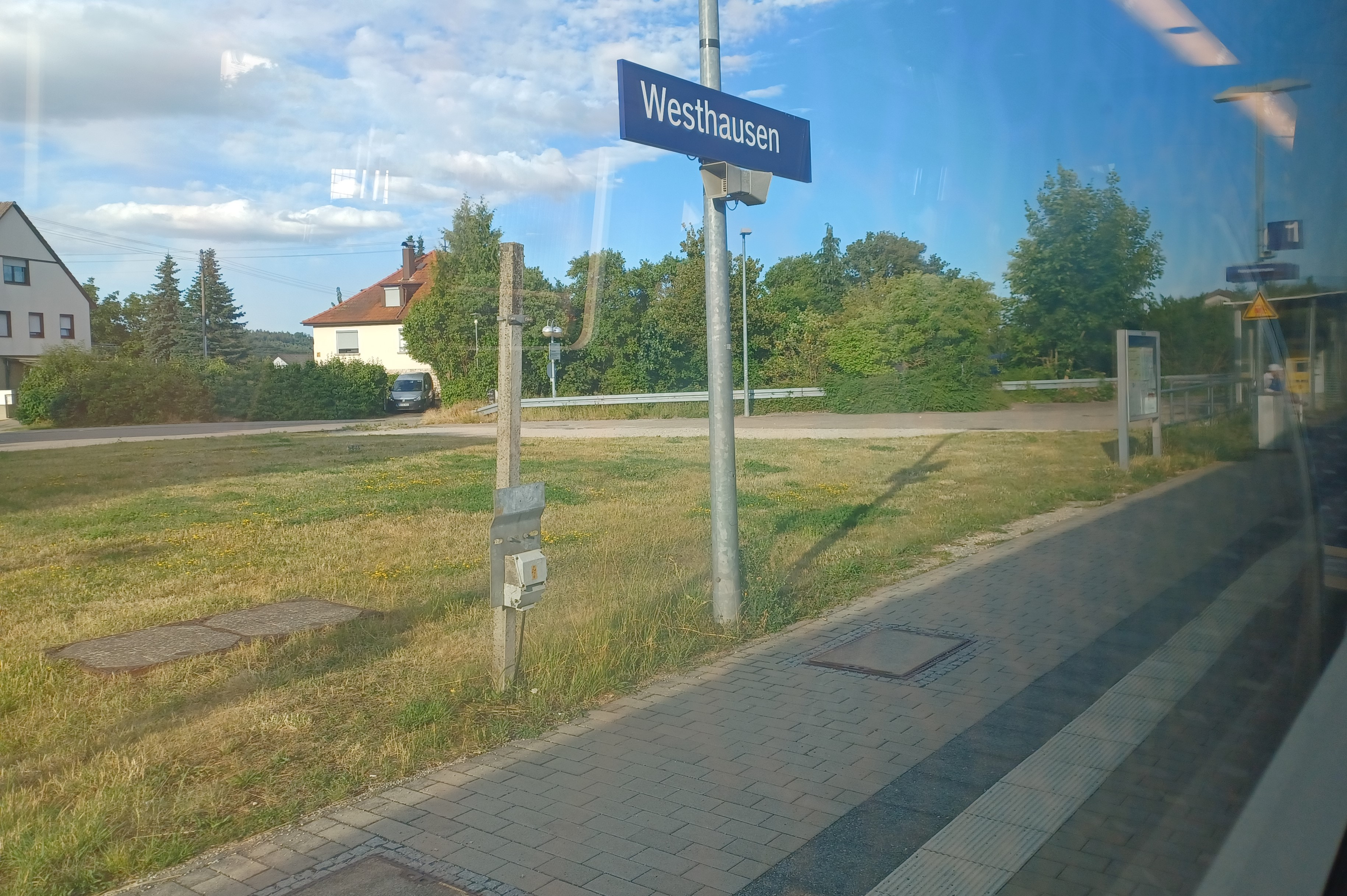

General information
- Location: Bahnhofstraße; 73463 Westhausen; Baden-Württemberg; Germany
- Coordinates: 48°52′53″N 10°11′01″E
- Elevation: 490 m (1,610 ft)
- System: Hp
- Owner: DB Netz
- Operator: DB Station&Service
- Lines: Stuttgart–Nördlingen (KBS 995)
- Platforms: 1 side platform
- Tracks: 1
- Train operators: Go-Ahead Bayern
- Connections: Bus interchange

Construction
- Parking: yes

Other information
- Station code: 6718
- DS100 code: TWX
- IBNR: 8006376
- Category: 7
- Fare zone: OAM: 1074
- Website: www.bahnhof.de

Services
Preceding station		Following station
Goldshöfe towards Aalen Hbf	RB 89	Lauchheim towards Donauwörth
Goldshöfe towards Aalen Hbf	RE 89	Lauchheim towards München Hbf
Location
- Location within Baden-Württemberg Location within Germany Location within Europe

Westhausen station is a railway stop in the municipality of Westhausen, located in the Ostalbkreis district in Baden-Württemberg, Germany. The station lies on the Stuttgart–Nördlingen railway. The train services are operated by Go-Ahead Bayern.
