= Forum Train Europe =

International railway organization in Europe

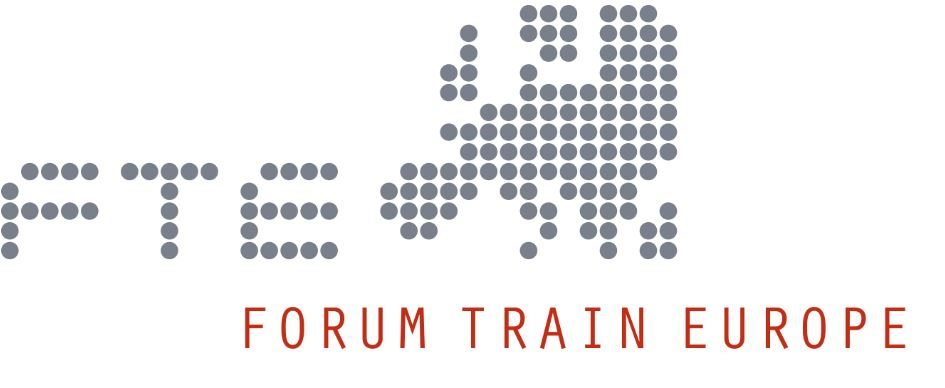

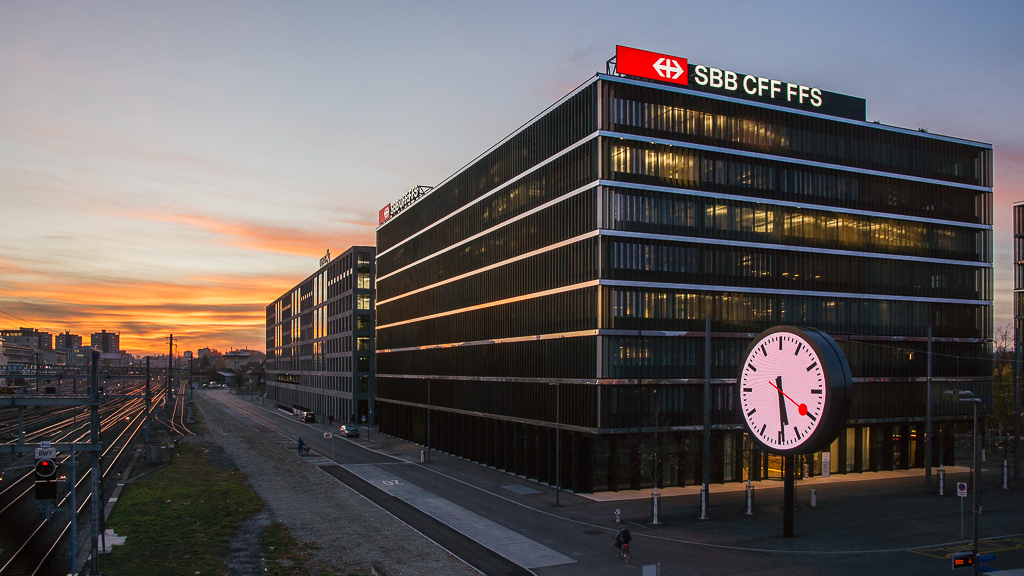
- FTE offices located within SBB Headquarters, Wankdorf, CH
- Type: Nonprofit organization, International Organization
- Industry: Rail Transportation
- Founded: January 1st 1997
- Headquarters: Bern, Switzerland
- Members: Railway Undertakings and Service Companies
- Number of employees: 8
- Website: www.forumtraineurope.eu

Forum Train Europe (FTE) is an international organization based in Bern, Switzerland. FTE serves as the primary coordination and exchange platform for Europe's railway undertakings in the area of timetabling and capacity management. The work of FTE and its members is ultimately aimed at promoting increased and improved freight and passenger rail connections in Europe.

== History ==
While FTE in its current form was established in 1997, its history stretches back well over a century, as it is the product of over 150 years of timetable conferences.

The first international timetabling conference for passenger traffic (known as CEH/EFK) occurred in Cologne, Germany in 1872. Following this, the first international timetabling conference for freight (CEM/EGK) occurred in Prague, Czechia, in 1923. These timetabling conferences provided a crucial platform for railway companies to meet and plan for international train paths.

In 1991, the European Commission adopted directive 91/440, which began the process of rail liberalization in the EU. This legislation mandated that railway companies, which until then both operated trains and owned and managed railway infrastructure, split those two functions into distinct companies or distinct divisions of the same company. This policy change from the European level led to a major restructuring of how railway networks are operated in Europe and necessitated the transformation of the way timetable conferences were organized. In 1996 and 1997, this resulted in the merger of CEH/EFK and CEM/EGK into one organization, known from then on as Forum Train Europe and the leave of Infrastructure Managers in 2004 to form an independent organization.

== Aims ==
FTE provides a forum in which European railway undertakings coordinate with each other in the areas of timetabling and capacity management. FTE acts as a think-tank by providing expertise and promoting exchange between its member's professionals and middle managers. Cross-border rail in Europe is characterized by a patchwork of procedures and tools for the running of trains. This is a legacy of the independent development of each European nation's railway network. FTE aims to encourage Europe-wide standardization of these timetabling and capacity management processes and tools. FTE's core business is further made up of the design, harmonization, and agreement of cross-border timetables and train compositions.

Since the early 1990s, the liberalization of Europe's railways has led to the breakup of railway operation and infrastructure management into independent companies. This has led to the current commercial environment of European rail, where the operations and business models of railway undertakings are dependent on the activities of the infrastructure managers. Thus, another core aim of FTE is to represent its member's interests in dealings with infrastructure managers, as well as other European organizations and international authorities.

== Working Areas ==
=== Coordination Platform ===
While railway undertakings are often competitors to one another, they must operate on the same infrastructure and under the same timetables and policies. Thus, it is mutually beneficial for railway undertakings to advocate together for their interests. These interests include transparent and standardized processes for capacity planning/allocation, as well as market-oriented and efficient service from infrastructure managers.

FTE carries out its primary function as a coordination platform for European railway undertakings in capacity management and timetabling through various working groups and yearly timetabling conferences.

=== Timetabling Conferences ===
FTE organizes multiple coordination conferences a year for both freight and passenger railway undertakings. These conferences coincide with major points in the development of Europe's yearly timetable. At FTE coordination conferences, members bring their concepts on train timetables for the upcoming annual timetable period for trains operated in partnership, and they try to harmonize these timetables and operation concepts. These concepts are then consolidated and used by railway undertakings in their planning for the coming timetable. FTE timetabling conferences are often held in Ljubljana, Slovenia.

There are three conferences per year for passenger railway undertakings. Coordination conference FTE A takes place in January and addresses the preparation of path study requests. FTE B, held at the end of March/beginning of April handles the finalization of path requests. Lastly, FTE C/D is held in July and covers a range of topics, including the fine-tuning of deployment of coaches and wagons, validation of the draft timetable, preparation and harmonizing of late path requests, and consultation of measures regarding construction works with international impact.

Freight railway undertaking participate in coordination conference FTE B as well as FTE D, which takes place at the beginning of July and covers the validation of the draft timetable and phrasing of observations.

=== Working Groups ===
Outside of timetabling conferences, FTE members coordinate with each other and the railway sector through various working groups, organized by FTE. Different to the conferences, these groups deal with improvements of the capacity management processes and related tools. These working groups (WG) include for instance FTE WG Passenger and FTE WG Freight for business topics, FTE WG IT for IT related topics and RU Ambassador Group for coordination and communication issues.

The main topics of FTE focus are:

- Temporary capacity restrictions
- RU input for the advance infrastructure/capacity planning
- Improvements in the annual and after annual timetabling
- Allocation rules for capacity shortage
- Integration of rail service facilities into capacity planning/allocation
- User-orientation of capacity related IT systems

FTE has also established few groups jointly with Rail Net Europe, an organization which represents infrastructure managers (IMs). In these groups the IMs and FTE members exchange views on the different business and IT topics and try to shape balanced sector orientated solutions.

=== Timetable Redesign (TTR) ===
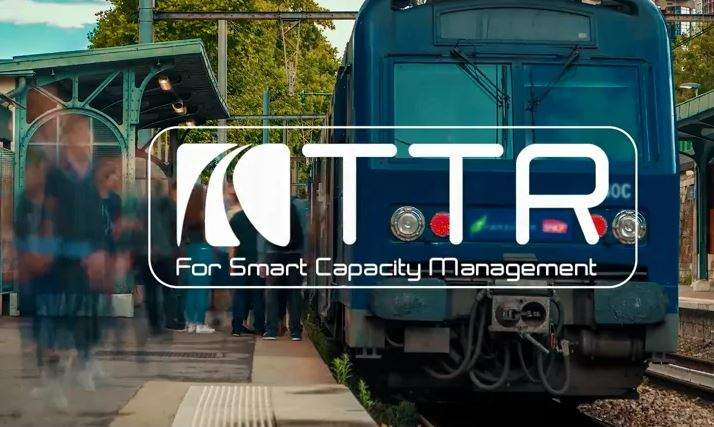
FTE is the co-developer of timetable redesign for smart capacity management (TTR)

Timetabling and Capacity Redesign for Smart Capacity Management (TTR) is a sector-led overhaul of the current timetabling process in Europe. TTR was initiated by Forum Train Europe in 2014 and is now managed together with RNE and with support from the European Freight Rail Association (ERFA). TTR has also gained interest and support from the European Union.

The current timetabling process, created in the previous century, is characterized by a lack of harmonization of the procedures used between European countries. The current timetabling procedure has been identified by the railway sector and the European Commission as in part contributing to the inflexibility, inefficiency, and ineffectiveness of the rail sector in Europe today, especially for freight and cross-border rail travel. Additionally, as Europe's rail sector has liberalized, timetabling and capacity management processes no longer reflect market-needs.

As co-developer of TTR alongside Rail Net Europe, the interests of railway undertakings are represented in the recreation of the timetabling and capacity management process. The aim of this approach is to ensure a sector-wide solution to timetabling and capacity management, rather than one which favors infrastructure managers or railway undertakings over the other.

While some limited aspects of TTR are already in place, the implementation is expected from timetable year 2025.

=== IT Co-development ===
FTE serves as a business advisor and co-developer of European capacity management IT systems of Infrastructure Managers. FTE members gather and discuss their functional requirements for IT within the group. The requirements are afterwards consolidated and provided to Rail Net Europe.

== Members ==
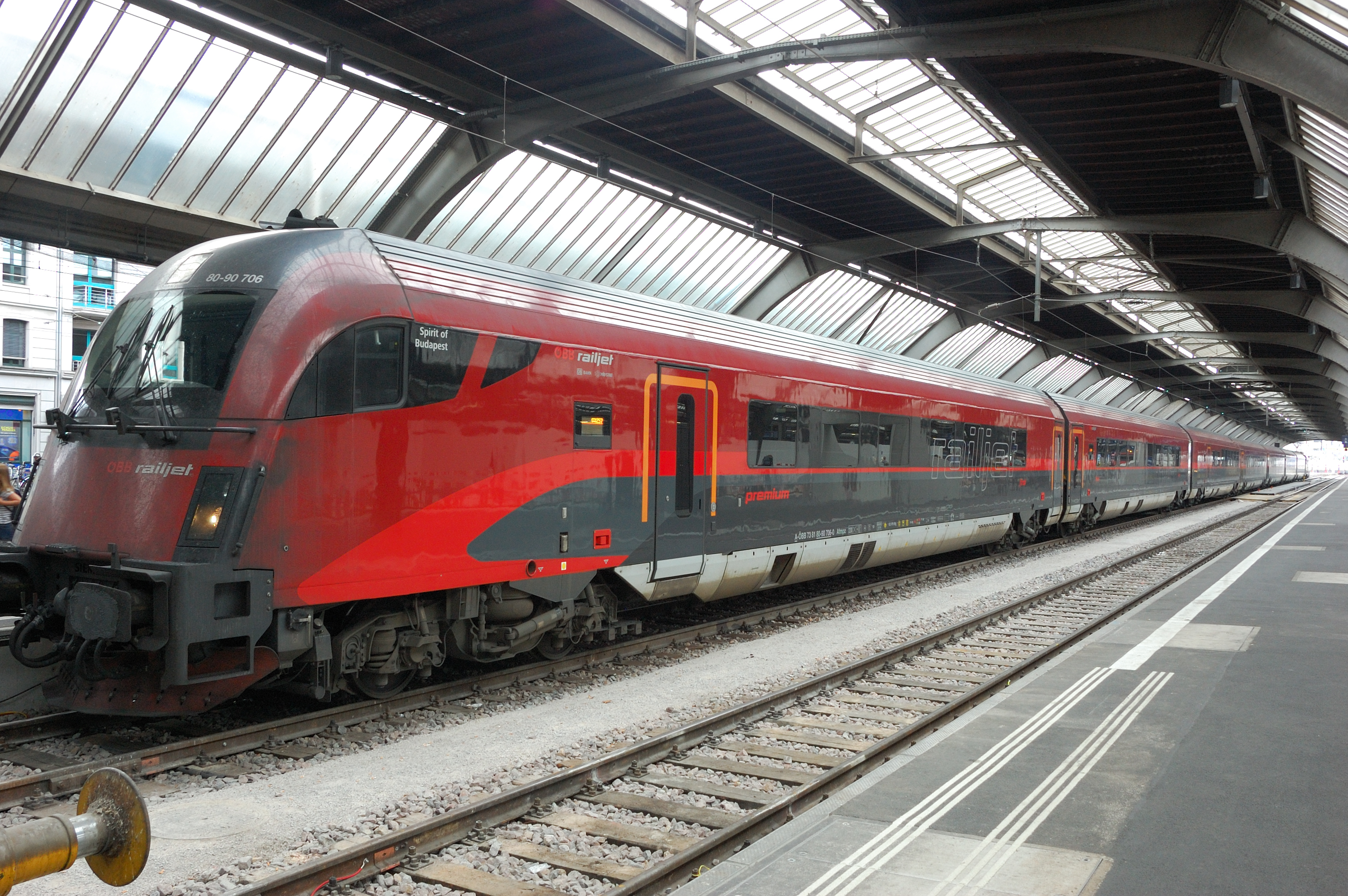
ÖBB Railjet

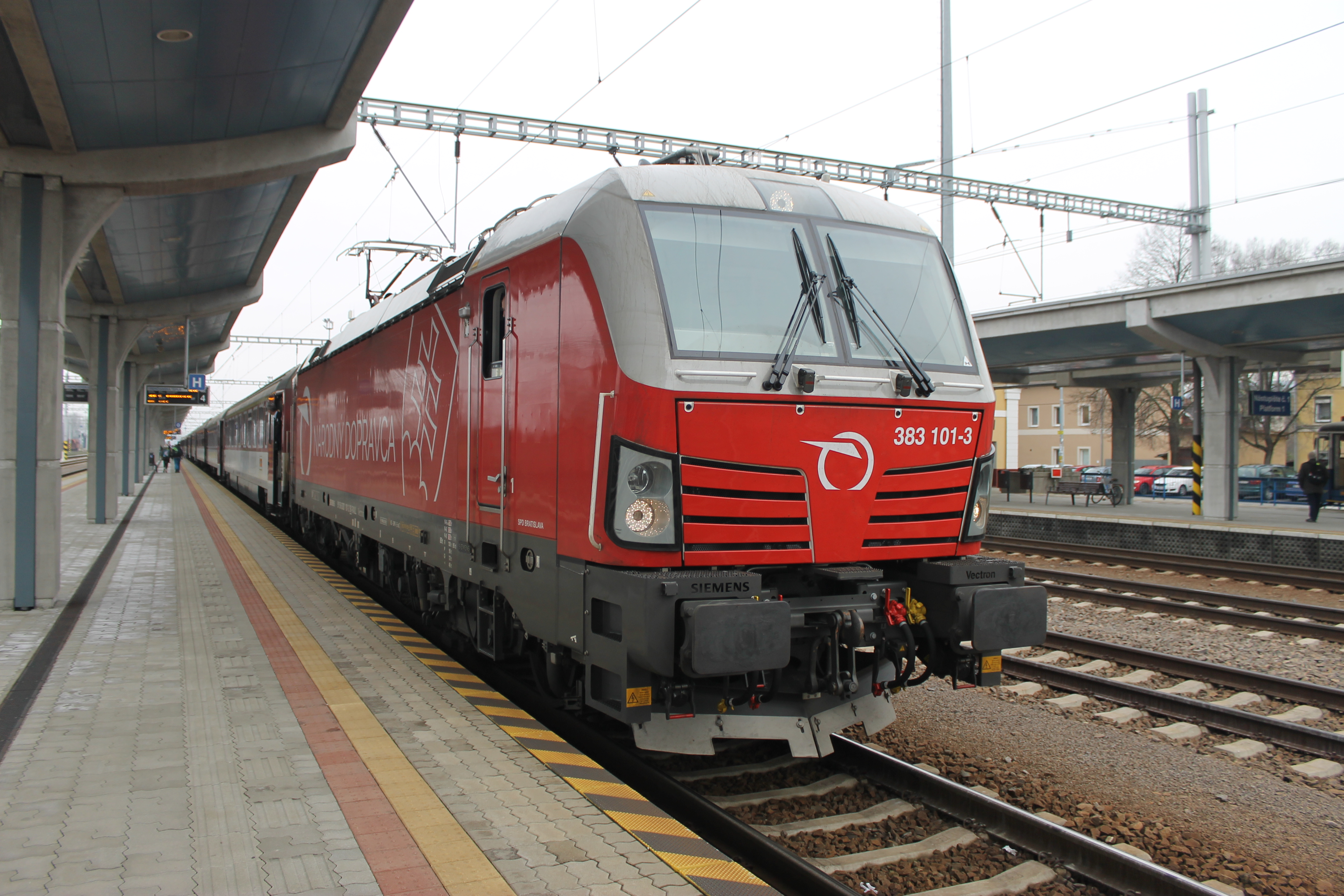
ZSSK Siemens Vectron

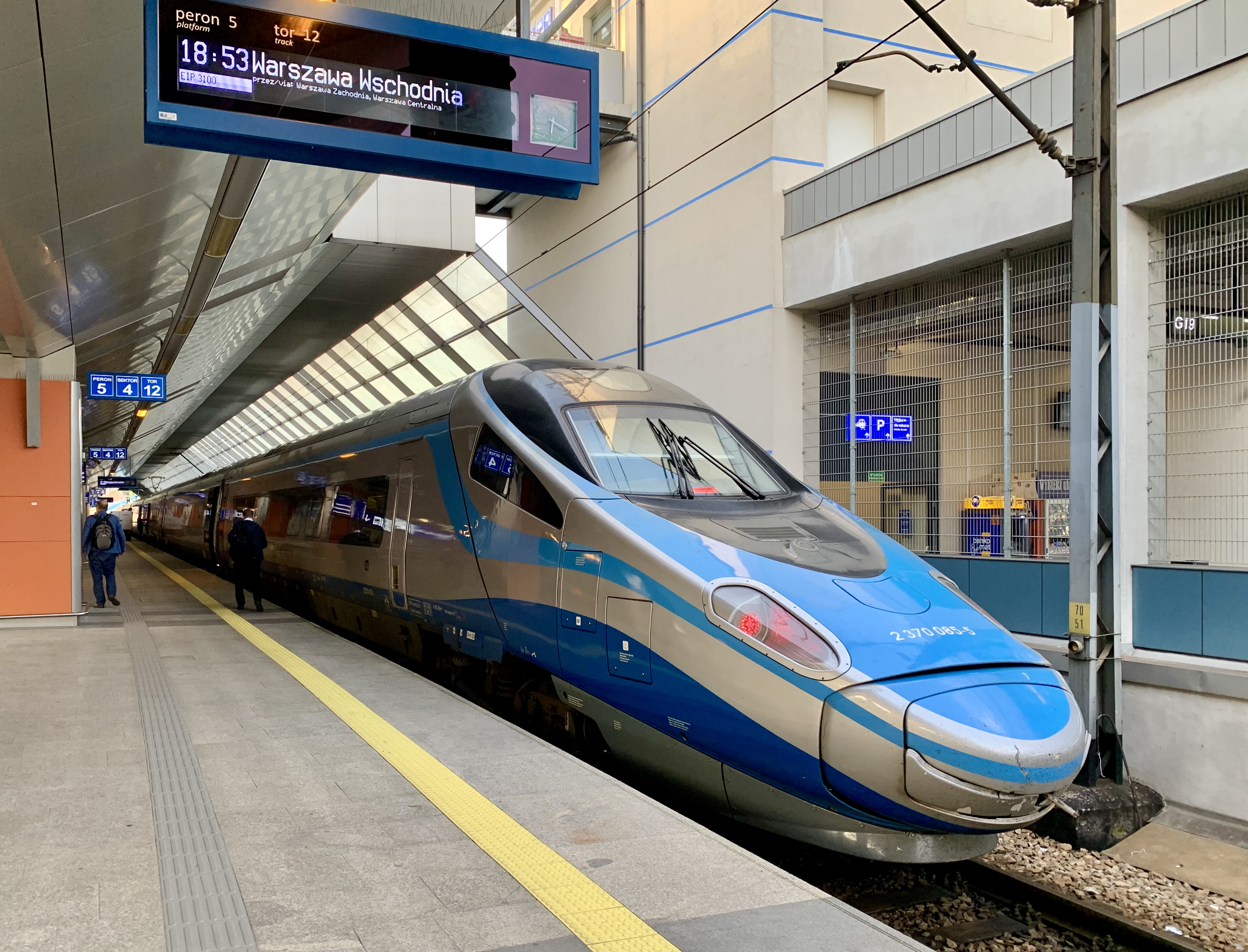
PKP Intercity ED250

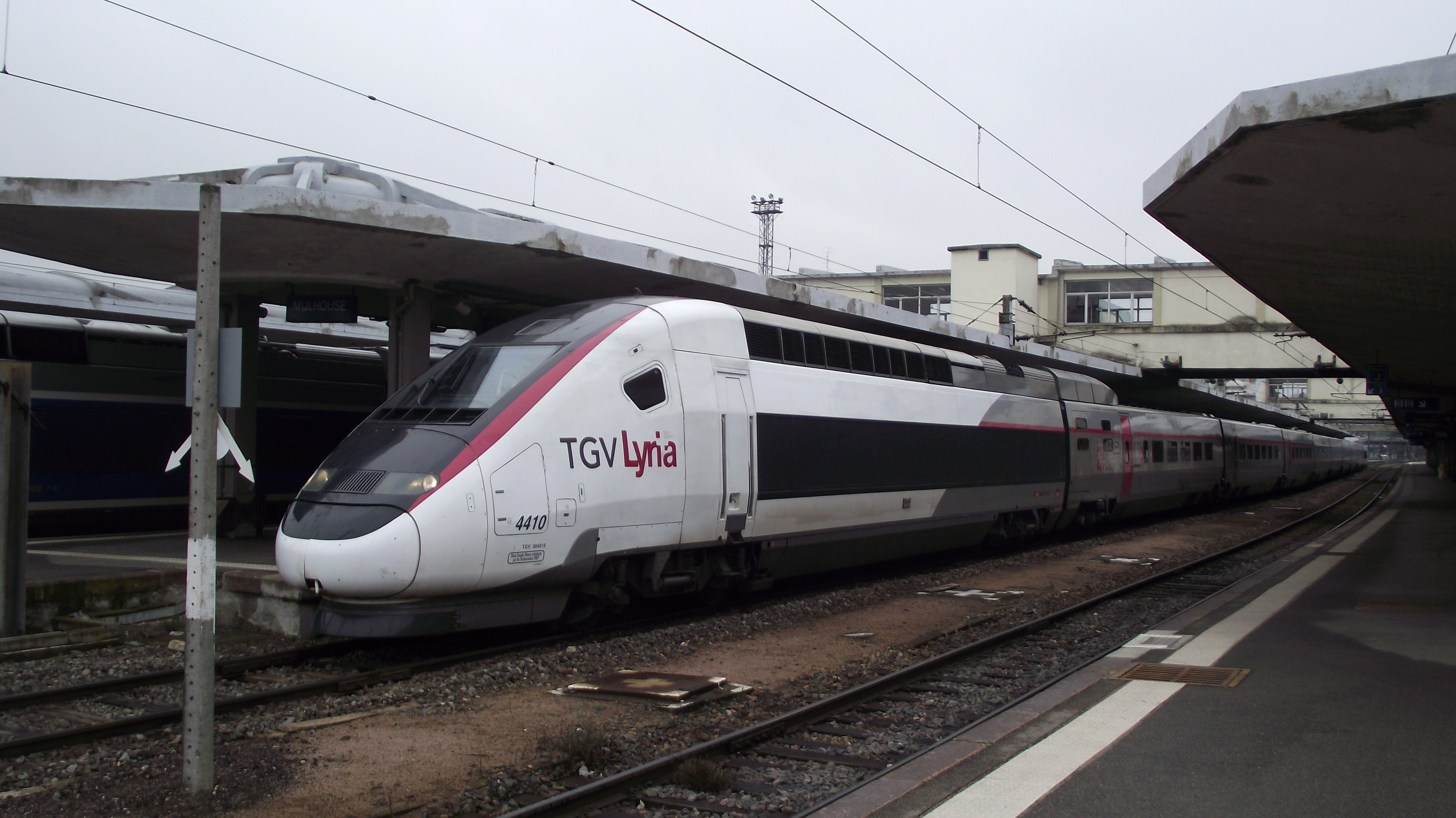
TGV Lyria POS

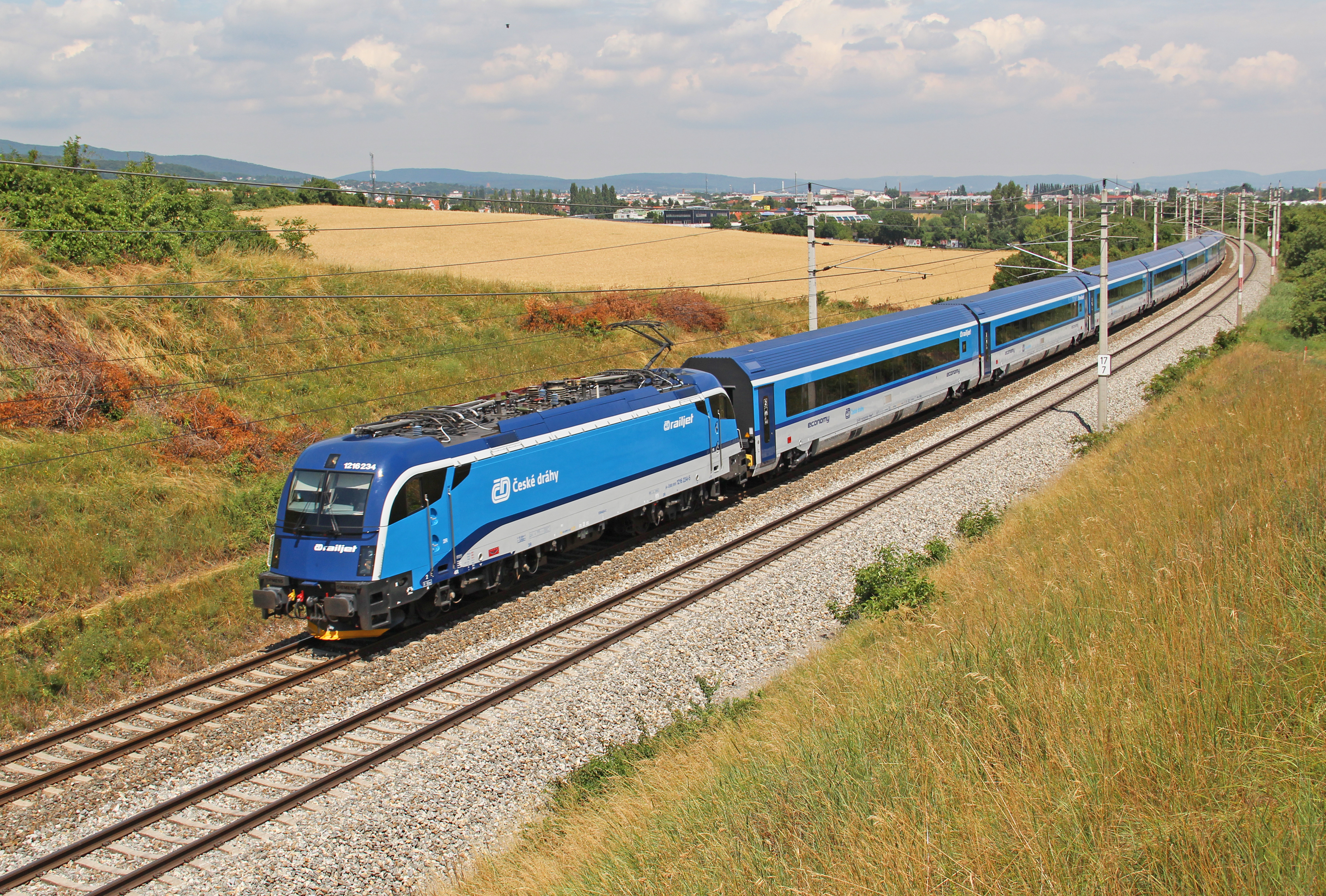
ČD Railjet

=== Passenger ===
As of January 2023.

Railway Undertaking / Service Company
BDZ Personenverkehr EOOD
BLS AG Personenverkehr
České Dráhy
DB Fernverkehr AG
DB Regio AG
DSB Danish State Railways
Eurostar
Hellenic Train
HŽ Croatian Railways
JLV a.s
JSC “Ukrzaliznytsia”
TGV Lyria
MÁV-START Hungarian Railways
SNCB/NMBS
Newrest Wagons-Lits Austria GmbH
NS Reizigers
ÖBB Personenverkehr AG
PKP Intercity S.A.
SBB CFF FFS
Slovenske železnice Slovenian Railways
SNCF Deutscheland
SNTFC Romanian Railways
SNCF Voyageurs
SNCF Voyageurs Italia
CFL Luxembourgish Railways
Srbija Voz ad
TCDD Turkish Railways
Thalys
Trenitalia France
Trenitalia
Trenord
Venice Simplon Orient-Express
Wagon Service
ŽSSK Slovakian Railways
ŽRS Republika Srpska Railways
ŽPCG Montenegrin Railways
ŽRSM Transport AD Skopje

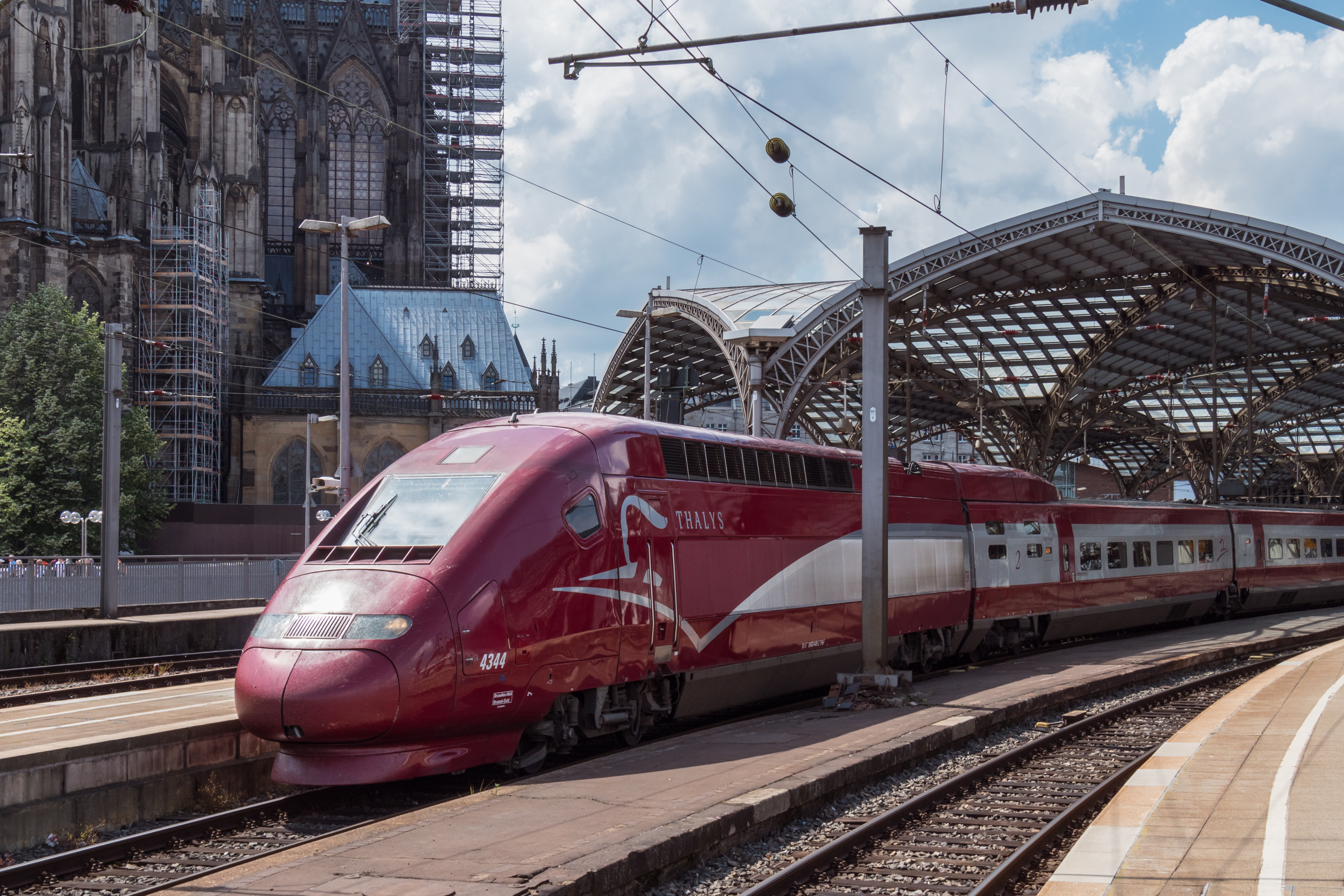
Eurostar TGV (formerly Thalys)

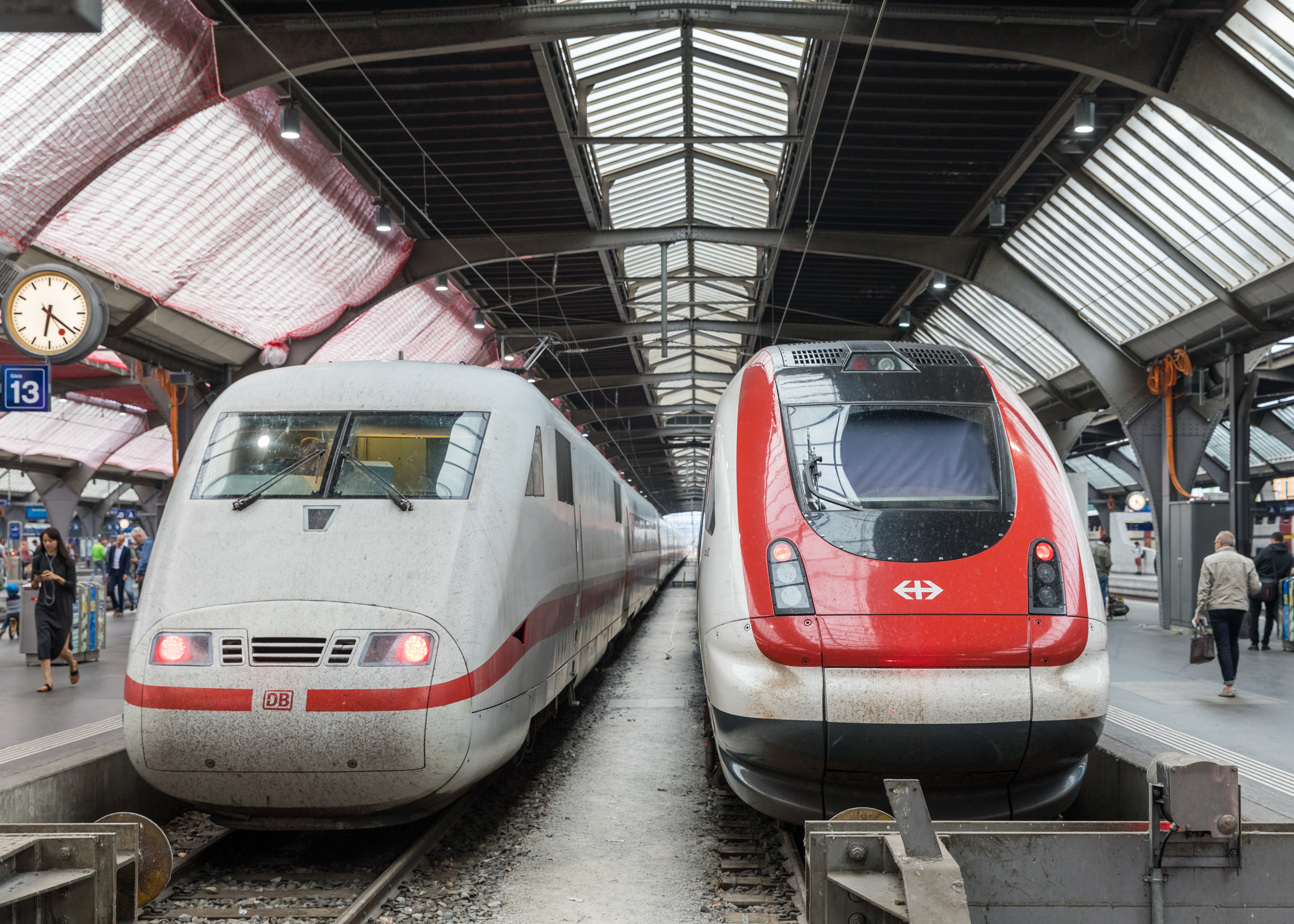
DB ICE 1 and SBB RABDe 500

=== Freight ===
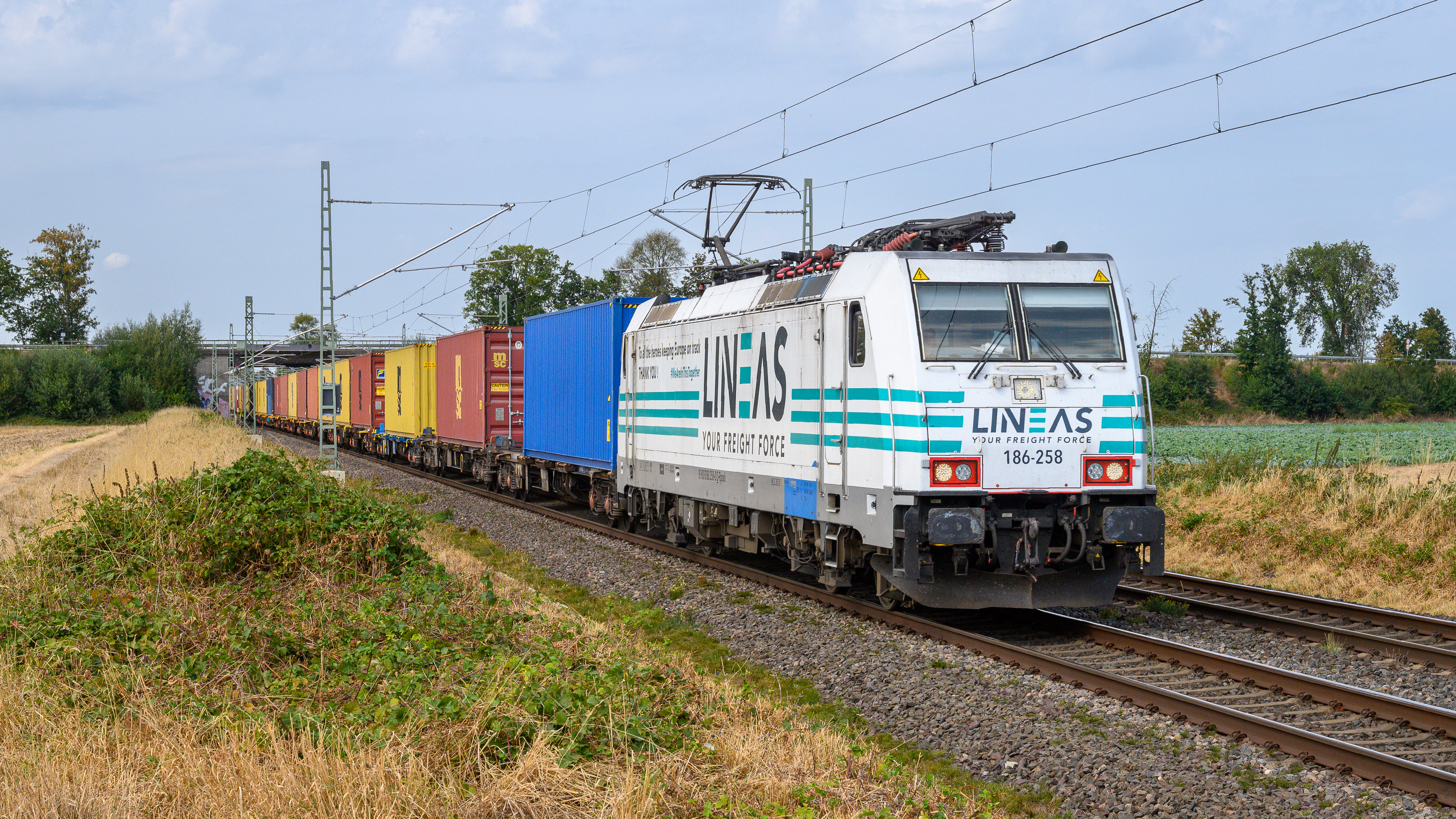
Lineas Bombardier TRAXX F140 MS

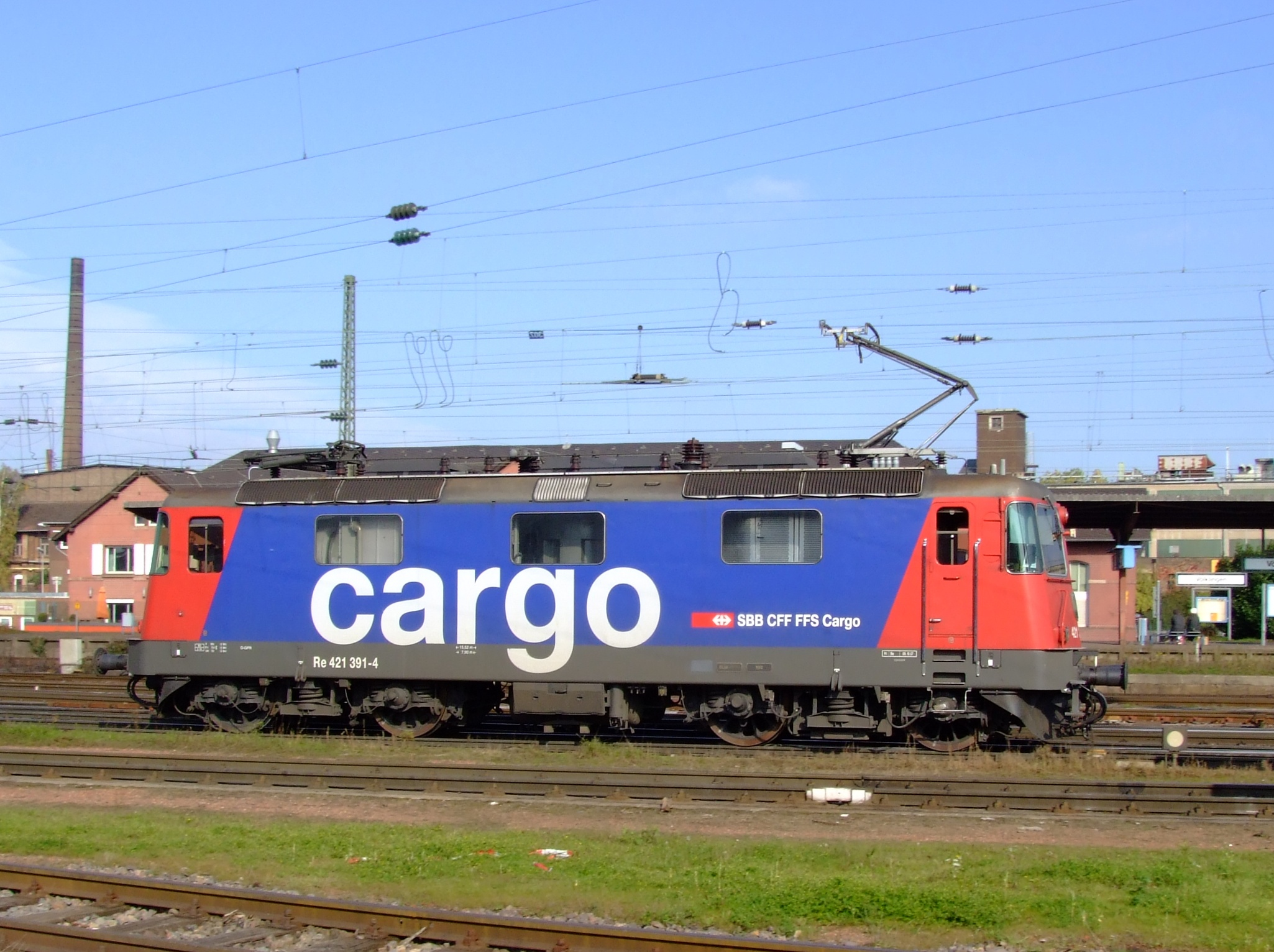
SBB Cargo Re 421

As of January 2023.

Railway Undertaking
BDZ Cargo
BLS Cargo
Bulgarian Railway Company
Captrain Italia
CFL Cargo
BLS Cargo Nord
ČD Cargo
DB Cargo Belgium
DB Cargo Bulgaria
DB Cargo Deutscheland
DB Cargo France
DB Cargo Italia
DB Cargo Nederland
DB Cargo Polska
DB Cargo Romania
DB Cargo Scandinavia
DB Cargo Switzerland
Fret SNCF
Green Cargo
GYSEV Cargo
Hellenic Train Cargo
Hupac Intermodal
HŽ Cargo
Lineas
LTE Logistik
Mercitalia
Metrans Danubia
Montecargo Rail
PEARL
PKP Cargo
Rail Cargo Austria
Rail Cargo Hungaria
RENFE Mercanias
SBB Cargo
SBB Cargo International
Grup Feroviar Român
SIBELIT
SŽ Cargo
Serbia Cargo
Turkish State Railways
Train Hungary
TXLogistic
Unicom
ŽS Cargo
ŽRSM Transport

== See also ==
- RailNetEurope
- Rail Transport in Europe
- European Green Deal
- Single European Railway Directive 2012
