= Lauchheim station =

Railway station in the municipality of Lauchheim

Lauchheim
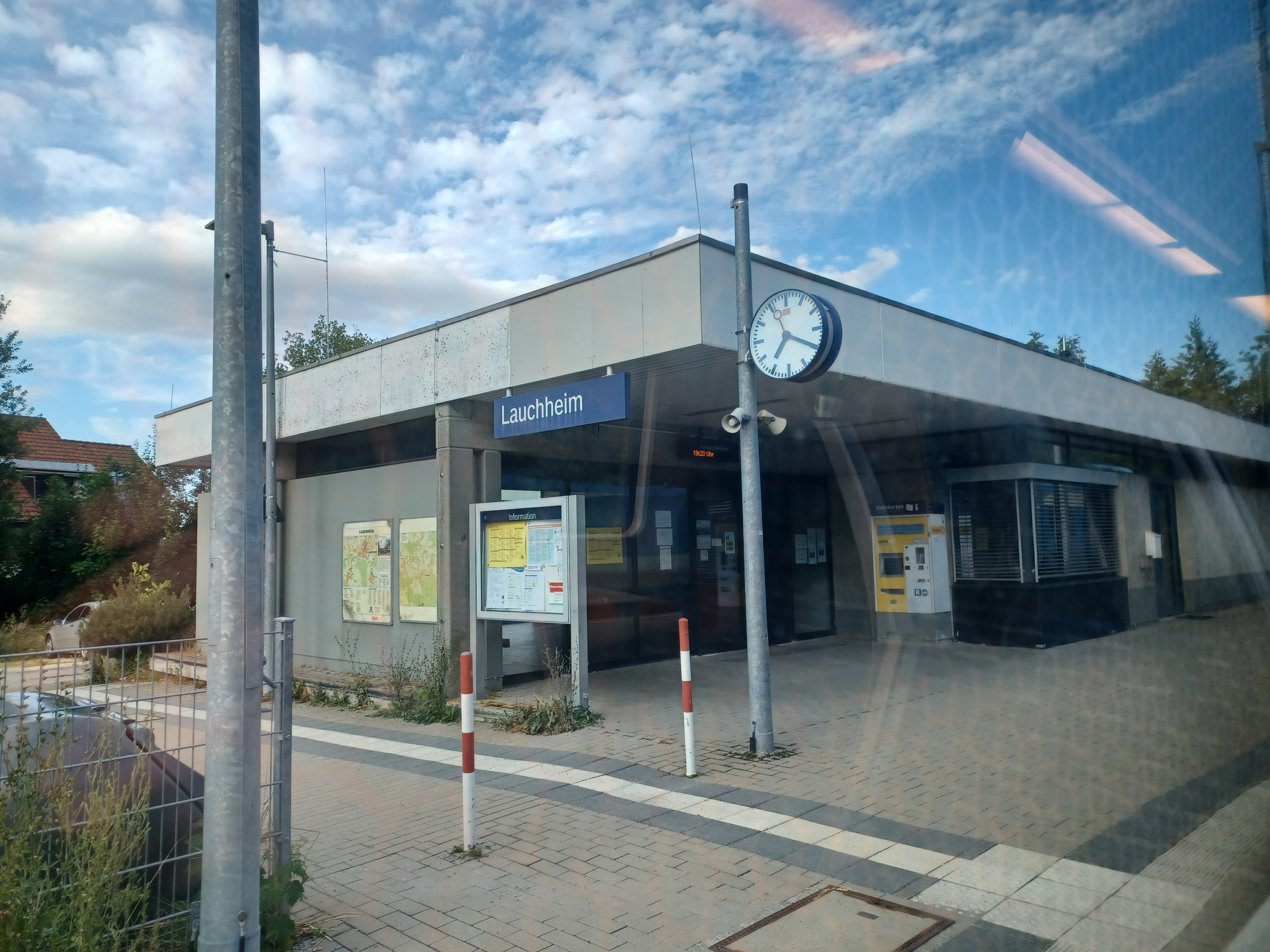

General information
- Location: Bahnhofstraße 33; 73466 Lauchheim; Baden-Württemberg; Germany
- Coordinates: 48°52′08″N 10°14′12″E
- Elevation: 517 m (1,696 ft)
- System: Bf
- Owner: DB InfraGO
- Operator: DB InfraGO
- Lines: Stuttgart–Nördlingen (KBS 989)
- Platforms: 2
- Tracks: 2
- Train operators: Arverio Bayern
- Connections: Bus interchange

Construction
- Parking: yes
- Cycle facilities: yes

Other information
- Station code: 3574
- DS100 code: TLH
- IBNR: 8003569
- Category: 6
- Fare zone: OAM: 1186
- Website: www.bahnhof.de

Services
Preceding station		Following station
Westhausen towards Aalen Hbf	RB 89	Aufhausen (Württ) towards Donauwörth
Westhausen towards Aalen Hbf	RE 89	Aufhausen (Württ) towards München Hbf
Location
- Location within Baden-Württemberg Location within Germany Location within Europe

Lauchheim station is a railway station in the municipality of Lauchheim, located in the Ostalbkreis district in Baden-Württemberg, Germany. The station lies on the Ries Railway. The train services are operated by Arverio Bayern.

== Structure ==
North of the tracks is a small station building with a waiting hall and a signal box next to it.

The station has two platform tracks on two platforms. Since the change of operator in 2022, delays and train cancellations have occurred more frequently on the line due to the lack of use of a platform. Previously, DB Regio had used track 2 occasionally to alleviate previous delays on the single-track Ries Railway. However, with the change of operator to Go-Ahead, access to track 2 was closed to passengers. According to Go-Ahead, this platform is too narrow, too low and the transition between tracks 1 and 2 does not comply with the rules. This means that trains can only cross at Lauchheim, but are not allowed to switch. This has an impact on the timetable, especially if the alternative track at Lauchheim is cancelled in the event of delays. Without the passing siding, trains have to wait at other stations.

Commuters and passengers have complained about the problems, and there are plans to hold a Ries Railway summit with all responsible parties to improve the situation on the line. Deutsche Bahn and Go-Ahead are working to find solutions to minimize delays and problems on the Ries Railway.
