= DB Netz =

Major subsidiary of Deutsche Bahn

- Company type: Joint-stock company
- Industry: Transport
- Founded: 1998
- Defunct: 31 December 2023
- Fate: Merged with DB Station&Service into DB InfraGO
- Headquarters: Frankfurt, Germany
- Area served: Germany
- Key people: Frank Sennhenn (acting CEO)
- Services: Railway infrastructure manager
- Owner: Deutsche Bahn
- Number of employees: 40,925 (2016)
- Website: fahrweg.dbnetze.com

DB Netz (German pronunciation: [deːbeː ˈnɛts]) was a major subsidiary of Deutsche Bahn that owned and operated a majority of the German railway system. It was one of the largest railway infrastructure managers by length (33,291 km as of 2019) and transport volume of its network.

On 1 January 2024, it merged with DB Station&Service to form DB InfraGO.

== Overview ==
The company was established in the course of the second stage of the German rail reform as a subsidiary of Deutsche Bahn. DB Netz was headquartered in Frankfurt and contained seven regional divisions ("Regionalbereiche", RB) and a central division. The locations of its regional headquarters were Berlin (RB east), Frankfurt (RB central), Duisburg (RB west), Hanover (RB north), Karlsruhe (RB southwest), Leipzig (RB southeast) and Munich (RB south). DB Netz AG was profitable from route fees but received extensive public funding for maintaining, developing and extending the network of European and federal transportation routes.

Despite being an integral part of Deutsche Bahn AG and one of its major subsidiaries, DB Netz AG had to grant non-discriminatory access to other rail service providers that are in competition to Deutsche Bahn's other major business units. Therefore DB Netz AG was overseen by the Federal Network Agency.

It was included in the division DB Netze when Deutsche Bahn was reorganized into three major divisions covering passengers, logistics, and infrastructure. However its legal entity remained. On 1 January 2024, it then merged with DB Station&Service to form DB InfraGO.
