= DB InfraGO =

German railway infrastructure company

DB InfraGO AG
- Company type: Limited company (Aktiengesellschaft)
- Industry: Railway infrastructure manager
- Predecessor: DB Netz and DB Station&Service
- Founded: 27 December 2023
- Headquarters: Frankfurt am Main, Germany
- Key people: Philipp Nagl (Chairman)
- Number of employees: 63,800
- Website: www.dbinfrago.com

DB InfraGO AG (GO short for gemeinwohlorientiert, lit. 'oriented towards public interest') is Germany's railway infrastructure management organization, operated as a wholly owned subsidiary of Deutsche Bahn (DB) in the legal form of a stock corporation (AG), which was founded on 27 December 2023 by renaming DB Netz and merging DB Station&Service into this company.

== History ==
In recent years the punctuality and state of German railway infrastructure has suffered, largely due to underinvestment caused partially by the privatization of DB. DB is also relatively unique in that previously, two separate legal entities were responsible for the railway infrastructure (DB Netz) and the railway stations (DB Station&Service). This unique structure was responsible for a lack of coordination between the two main infrastructure companies which had only further hindered the ability of DB to return to punctuality. It was clear that something needed to change. After the German Federal election of 2021, in the 'Traffic Light' Coalition/Scholz Government, a merger of DB Netz and DB Station&Service was agreed upon to form a common good-oriented (gemeinwohlorientiert) infrastructure division within Deutsche Bahn.

The Supervisory Board of Deutsche Bahn decided to proceed with this merger to form DB InfraGO in its regular meeting held on 27 September 2023. According to the statement of the Supervisory Board Chairman, Werner Gatzer, the resolution created the legal basis for a common good-oriented infrastructure firm. That same month, the German Federal Council demanded in a statement that the newly merged entity should also incorporate DB Energie; a separate legal entity that DB had previously put in place to own and operate it railway electric grid in a somewhat unique approach. Despite this, the company remains a separate entity as of February 2024.

Regarding the organization of the new company, it was previously announced that the general works councils of both companies and EVG transit union had ensured that the previous structures in the cross-sectional areas would remain unchanged for at least three years.

The profits of DB InfraGO will be transferred directly to the Germany Federal Government and not, as was previously the case, to Deutsche Bahn as a holding company.

In December 2023, Peter Westenberger, managing director of the freight railway association Die Güterbahnen, expressed legal concerns with reference to Art. 87e paragraph 5 of the Basic Law. regarding the planned merger of DB Netz and DB Station&Service, as the merger is planned without a legal basis and requires the participation of the federal states.

== Organisation ==
General KPIs
	2023
Employees	61,400
Turnover	7.535 M. Euro

By merging the two companies DB Netz and DB Station & Service, the following divisions have now been created within DB InfraGO:

=== Track division ===
The track division, previously DB Netz, employs around 56,000 people and is responsible for the maintenance, operation and new construction/expansion of the German rail network. This includes, for example, dispatchers (Fahrdienstleiter), timetable creators (Fahrplanersteller), and route services employees. Maintenance of way specialists are also included in this division, although actual construction services are often outsourced to either the DB internal Bahnbaugruppe (Railway Construction Group) or to private industry.

In accordance with the guidelines of the Coalition Government, this division should also ensure that every rail transport company has non-discriminatory access to the German rail network.

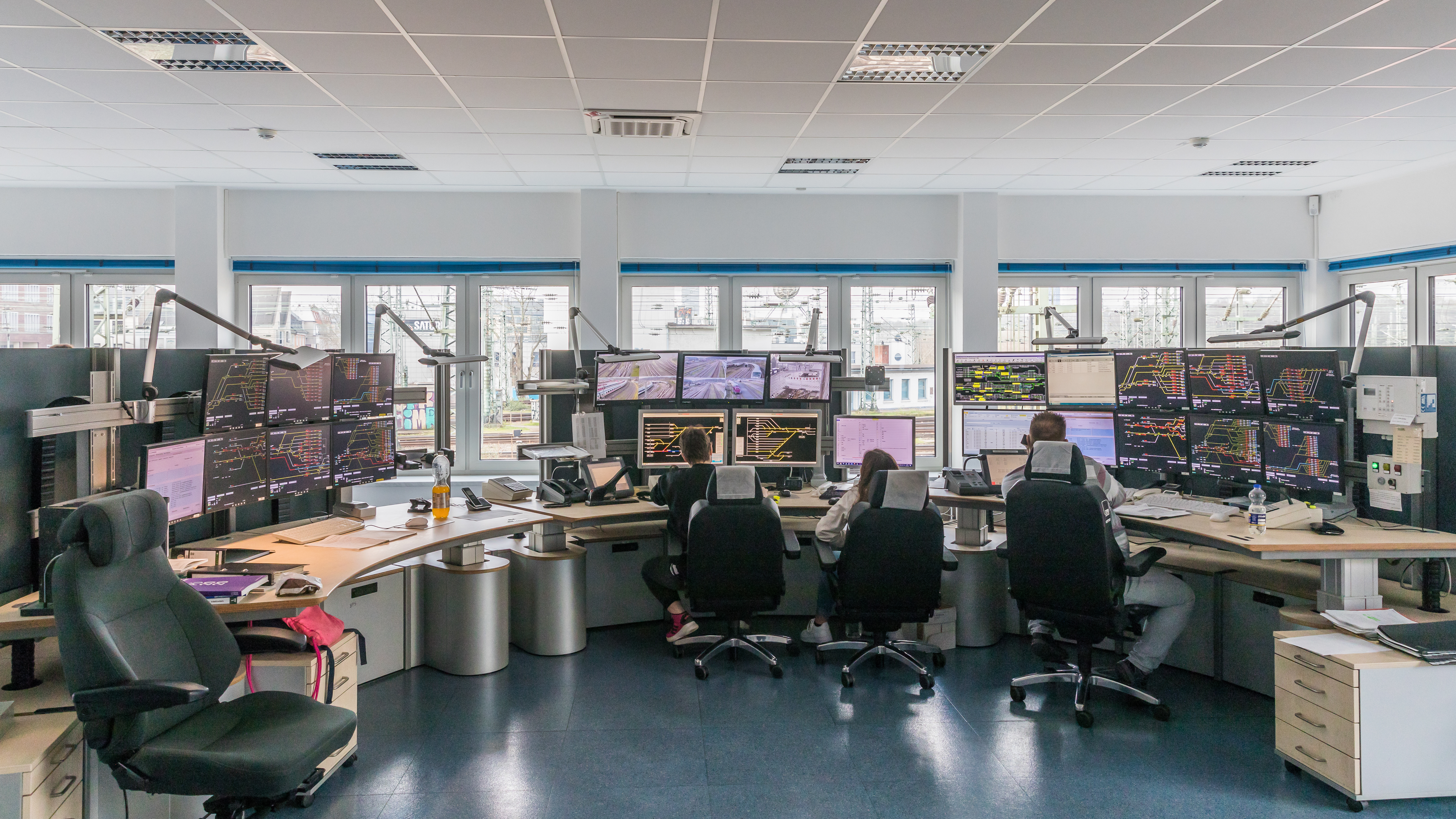
Electronic interlocking, Cologne Central Station

Track division KPIs
	2022
Network operating performance	1,130 M. (route kilometers)
Network route length	33,400 km
Network track length (in km)	60,800 km
Switches and junctions	64,760
Railway crossings	13,530
Railway tunnels	745
Railway bridges	25,719
Signal boxes/interlockings	3,850

=== Passenger station division ===
The passenger stations division, previously DB Station & Service, is responsible for the operation, maintenance and organization of around 5,400 transport stations in Germany. This business area includes, for example, the service employees at the DB Information counters, the platform supervisors, and numerous other employees who enable railway companies and business customers to access the station infrastructure.

Over 8,000 people work in this business area.

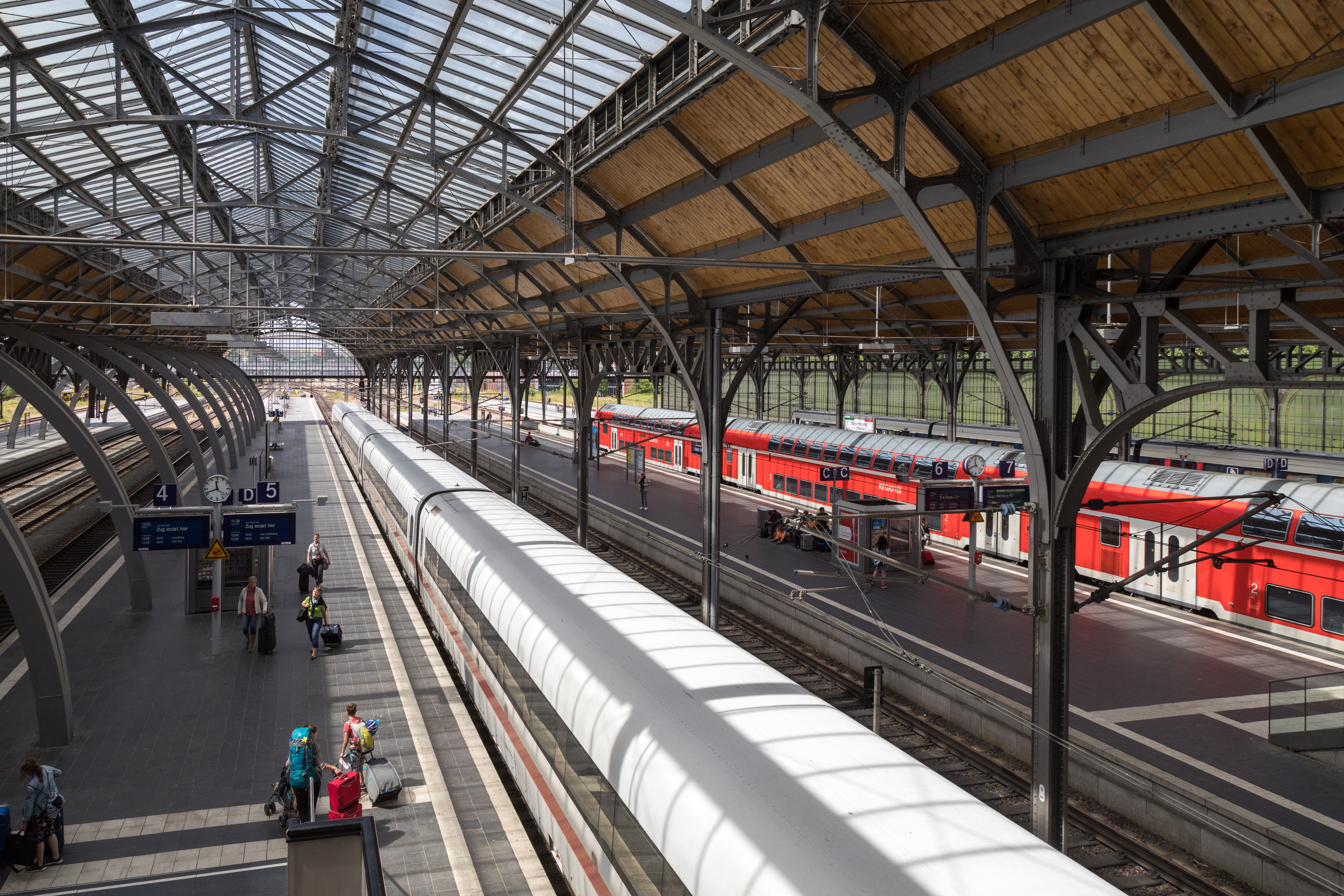
Lübeck Hauptbahnhof

Passenger station division KPIs
	2022
Boardings per year	156 M.
Daily station visitors	21 M.
Railway transport operators servicing DB InfraGO stations	120
Active railway stations	5,400
Head houses	700

== Common good orientation ==
According to the definition of the Federal Ministry for Economic Affairs and Climate Action, companies that are oriented towards the common good are characterized by the fact that their business activities are aimed at social good, while profits are primarily spent to achieve this social goal. The ownership and organizational structures are also aimed at this goal. In the context of DB InfraGO, this means that the core business of railway infrastructure maintenance and expansion should be consistently aligned with the social needs of the population, the economy and the environment.

The Federal Ministry for Digital and Transport sees the purpose of DB InfraGO as supporting a needs-based, strong, and efficient railway infrastructure system with high capacity, quality, and resilience. This applies to the operation, expansion, and maintenance of the railway infrastructure.

== General rehabilitation of the network ==
=== Plan and goals ===
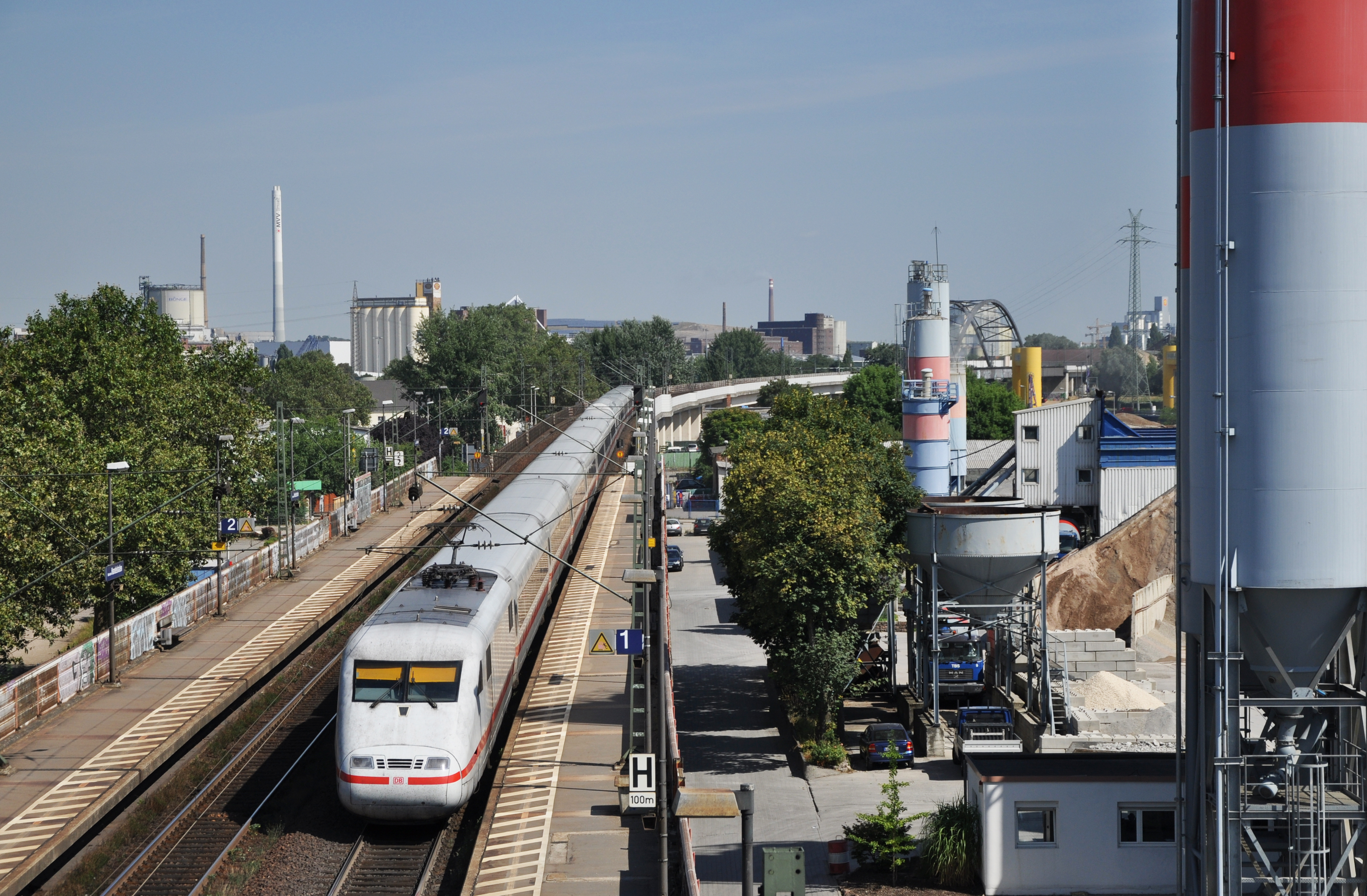
An ICE on the Riedbahn in Mannheim

Due to underinvestment in maintenance of the railway infrastructure in the recent decades since partial privatization, around 40 corridors in the DB InfraGO network are classified as overcapacity. These include, among others: the railway lines Mannheim–Frankfurt (Riedbahn), Berlin–Hamburg and Emmerich–Oberhausen (Hollandstrecke).

In response, the Federal Ministry for Digital and Transport, together with the board of directors of Deutsche Bahn, presented a restructuring plan in the summer of 2023. By 2030, the affected 40 routes are to be completely renovated through closures, some of which last several months, thereby increasing their performance and reducing the frequency of disruptions. For this purpose, DB received an additional 12.5 billion euros in equity capital and, with DB InfraGO, which was launched in January 2024, is tasked with expanding the corridors.

== Criticism ==
There is criticism that the costs for such a short-term 'general renovation' would already exceed the calculated costs for the first projects and are therefore much more expensive than normal renovation in long-term planned periods. The costs for expanding the Mannheim–Frankfurt railway line (Riedbahn) had already risen from 7.1 to 18.6 million euros per kilometer in mid-2024. There are also fears that the rest of the network outside the planned corridors will remain in a dilapidated condition.

== Investments ==
DB InfraGO AG holds at least 50% interest in each of the following companies:

- DB Fahrwegdienste GmbH
- Deutsche Umschlaggesellschaft Schiene-Straße
- SIGNON Deutschland GmbH
- DB Broadband GmbH
- DB RegioNetz Infrastruktur GmbH
- Digitale Schiene Deutschland|DSD Digitale Schiene Deutschland GmbH
- MEKB GmbH (Mein EinkaufsBahnhof GmbH)
- DB BahnPark GmbH
