= RailNetEurope =

Association of European rail Infrastructure Managers

- Headquarters: Wien, Austria

RailNetEurope (RNE) is a non-profit organization working to increase the accessibility, quality and efficiency of the European rail network throughout Europe. There are currently 37 railway infrastructure managers and/or Allocation Bodies who are members of RNE.

== History ==
RailNetEurope was founded in January 2004. Its first accomplishment was the launch and the signing of a co-operation agreement on joint marketing of international freight train paths at InnoTrans in Berlin in September 2002.

== Aims ==
The aim of the association is to provide support to Railway Undertakings (RUs) in their international activities (both for freight and passengers) and to increase the efficiency of the Infrastructure Managers’ processes.

Members of RailNetEurope are working on the harmonization of international rail transport conditions and procedures in the field of international rail infrastructure management, whilst introducing a corporate approach to promote the European railway business for the benefit of the entire rail industry across Europe.

== One-Stop-Shop principle ==
RNE members strive to act as a single european rail infrastructure company in the field of international rail traffic. This is embedded in the One-Stop-Shop (OSS) principle, whereby various international products and services are handled at a single point of contact for the entire international route. Thus, RNE has established a network of OSS representatives, one for each rail infrastructure, who are the personal contact points for all customer care issues.

== Tasks ==
The tasks of the organization are carried out by standing working groups and ad hoc project groups coordinated by the RNE Joint Office, which is based in Vienna, Austria. RNE provides support to its members as regards compliance with the European legal framework. For example, the development of harmonized international processes, templates and guidelines. Many of these services can now assist the IMs with fulfilling requirements imposed by a new European Union Regulation: Regulation (EU) No 913/2010 of the European Parliament and of the Council of 22 September 2010 concerning a European rail network for competitive freight. Thus, the RNE General Assembly decided that RNE should become ‘the service provider of choice and expert support provider for Freight Corridor Organizations in the areas of developing methods and processes and developing and operating tools. In its daily work, the association strives to simplify, harmonies and optimize international rail processes such as: - Europe-wide timetabling, - common sales approaches (including annual Network Statements published by rail Infrastructure Managers), - co-operation between IMs in the field of operations, - train information exchange in real time across Europe's borders (e.g. monitoring of train movements), - after-sales services (e.g. reporting on train movements, including delays).

== Members and network ==
When RailNetEurope was launched in January 2004, it had 16 founding members. RNE currently counts 37 full members and 9 associate members from all corners of Europe. These are either rail Infrastructure managers or allocation Bodies. Their networks span 26 different countries, totaling over 230,000 kilometers of railway lines.

== IT at the service of the railways ==
Much of RailNetEurope's work consists of developing IT systems supporting the harmonization of conditions and procedures in international rail infrastructure management. Currently, the following three IT systems are in use.

The Path Coordination System (PCS) is an international path request coordination system at the disposal of Path Applicants, Railway Undertakings (RUs), Infrastructure Managers (IMs) and Allocation Bodies (ABs). The system optimises international path coordination by enabling harmonised path requests and offers to be agreed by all involved parties. The PCS offers an easy handling of path requests; it guarantees transparency in workflow and processing status.
The Train Information System (TIS) supports international train management by delivering real-time train data concerning international passenger and freight train movements. It monitors international trains from origin to destination on the rail networks of many RNE Members. A web-based application, it processes data directly from the Infrastructure Managers‘ systems and is being steadily rolled out across Europe. The TIS has 3 main functions: real-time information, reporting and data exchange.
The Charging Information System (CIS) is a rail infrastructure charge information system for Railway Undertakings (RUs), Infrastructure Managers (IMs) and Allocation Bodies (ABs). This web-based system provides fast information on charges related to the use of European rail infrastructure. Moreover, it estimates the price for the use of train paths within minutes.
