= DB Station&Service =

Subsidiary of Deutsche Bahn

- Company type: State-owned
- Industry: Rail transport
- Founded: 1 January 1999
- Defunct: 31 December 2023
- Fate: Merged with DB Netz into DB InfraGO
- Headquarters: Berlin, Germany
- Products: Rail transport; Cargo transport; Services
- Revenue: ▲€ 1.339 billion (2020)
- Number of employees: c. 6,000 (2020)
- Parent: Deutsche Bahn
- Subsidiaries: DB BahnPark; DB ServiceStore
- Website: bahnhof.de

DB Station&Service was a subsidiary of Deutsche Bahn, responsible for managing over 5,400 train stations on the German railway network.

On 1 January 2024, it merged with DB Netz to form DB InfraGO.
