= Railway infrastructure manager =

A railway infrastructure manager is a rail transport company or body of another type, responsible for maintaining railway infrastructure. The European Union defines it as "any body or undertaking that is responsible in particular for establishing and maintaining railway infrastructure. This may also include the management of infrastructure control and safety systems. The functions of the infrastructure manager on a network or part of a network may be allocated to different bodies or undertakings" This includes mainly railway track and catenary, if the railway line is electrified, and respective command and control systems. It can also include the stations and power supply network. A significant proportion of these companies are state-owned monopolies, responsible for all or most of the railway infrastructure within a given country.

Ownership and operation of these two components vary by location. In some places (notably most of North America), private railway companies own and operate both the infrastructure and the rolling stock (for example, Union Pacific). In the United Kingdom, the infrastructure is owned and maintained by Network Rail while rolling stock is largely owned and operated by private railway companies. In countries with nationalized rail systems, such as China, both the infrastructure and the rolling stock are owned and operated, directly or indirectly, by the national government. In the European Union (EU), separation of infrastructure and operation is mandated by law, so train operation is performed by another type of company, a railway undertaking which must be provided with non-discriminatory access to any railway path within the EU. Outside the European Union it is possible that the same company is owning the infrastructure and also operating trains and in that case this designation might not make sense. Infrastructure managers charge for the use of their network.

== Management of railway infrastructure ==
=== Operation ===
The operation of the railway is through a system of control, originally mechanical, but nowadays more usually electronic and computerized.

=== Signalling ===
Signaling systems used to control traffic movement may be either fixed-block or moving-block.

Fixed block signaling

Most blocks are 'fixed' blocks, i.e., they delineate a section of track between two defined points. On timetable, train order, and token-based systems, blocks usually start and end at selected stations. On signaling-based systems, blocks usually start and end at signals. Alternatively, cab signalling may be in use.

The lengths of blocks are designed to allow trains to operate as frequently as necessary. A lightly used branch line might have blocks many kilometers long, whilst a busy commuter railway might have blocks a few hundred meters long.

Moving block signaling

A disadvantage of fixed blocks is that the faster trains are permitted to run, the longer the stopping distance, and therefore the longer the blocks need to be. This decreases a line's capacity.

With moving block, computers calculate a 'safe zone' behind each moving train that no other train may enter. The system depends on precise knowledge of where each train is and how fast it is moving. With a moving block, lineside signals are not provided, and instructions are passed directly to the trains. It has the advantage of increasing track capacity by allowing trains to run much closer together. The system is used only on a very few independent networks, such as underground lines.

=== Types of rail system ===
Most rail systems serve multiple functions on the same tracks, carrying local, long-distance, and commuter passenger trains, as well as freight trains. The emphasis on each varies by country. Some urban rail transit, rapid transit, and light rail systems are isolated from the national system in the cities they serve. Some freight lines serving mines are also isolated, and the mine company usually owns these. An industrial railway is a specialized rail system used inside factories or mines. Steep grade railways are usually isolated, with special safety systems.

=== Permanent way and railroad construction ===
The permanent way trails through the physical geography. The physical geography limits the tracks' geometry.

=== Maintenance of way operations ===
The presence of a work train on a given section of track will temporarily reduce the route's capacity. The standard procedure in such operations is to halt all other traffic during the track's 'occupation'. Services may be diverted by an alternative route, if available; alternatively, passenger services may be maintained using a replacement bus service. It is therefore more economically viable to plan such track occupations for periods of reduced usage (e.g., 'off-peak', overnight or holiday times) to minimize the impact on normal services and revenue.

== Feasibility factors ==
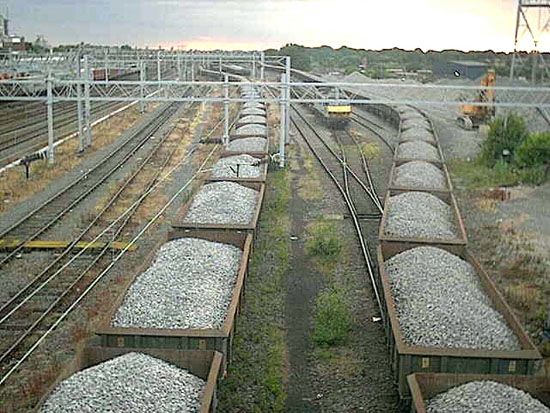
Freight wagons await unloading in the United Kingdom

Each transport system represents a contribution to a country's infrastructure and, as such, must make economic sense or eventually close. From this, each has one or more roles. These may change with time, but they affect the specifications of each particular system. Rail transport systems are built into the landscape, including both the physical geography (hills, valleys, etc.) and the human geography (location of settlements). The rail transport system may, in turn, feed back into the human geography.

=== Physical geography ===
The permanent way of a system must pass through the geography and geology of its region. This may be flat or mountainous, and may include obstacles such as water and mountains. These, in part, determine the system's intrinsic nature. The slope at which trains run must also be calculated correctly. In this stage, it is decided where tunnels pass.

=== Human geography ===
Rail transport systems affect human geography. Large cities (such as Nairobi) may be founded by a railroad passing through. Historically, when a station has been built outside the town or city it is intended to serve, that town has expanded to include the station, or buildings (especially Inns) have sprung up near the station. The existence of a station may increase the number of commuters who live in a town or village and so cause it to become a dormitory town. The transcontinental railroad was a large factor in American colonization of the Western frontier. China's railroad expansion into Tibet may have similar consequences.

=== Historical factors ===
Rail transport systems are often used for purposes they were not designed for, but have evolved to serve them due to changes in human geography. Politics can play a large part in decisions about railways, such as the Beeching Axe. In the UK, building or rebuilding a railway usually requires an Act of Parliament. In many countries, rail subsidies allow unprofitable but socially desirable railways to continue operating.
