= FTE =

FTE may refer to:

== Economics ==
- Flow-through entity, a corporate legal entity where income flows, untaxed, to investors
- Flows to equity, a method of corporate valuation
- Full-time equivalent, the total hours contracted to a group of employees, divided by the hours worked by a full-time employee

== Government and non-profit organisations ==
- Florida's Turnpike Enterprise, an agency of the state government of Florida, United States
- Forum Train Europe, an international organisation in the field of rail transportation
- Foundation for Teaching Economics, an American educational organization
- Foundation For Technical Education, a Swiss educational organization
- Foundation for Thought and Ethics, an American intelligent design organization
- Foundation of Technical Education, an Iraqi administrative organization

== Science and technology ==
- Failure to eject, when a firearm fails to eject a shell, casing or cartridge
- Fault Tolerant Ethernet, a form of Ethernet LAN
- Flight test engineer, a support role in aircraft flight testing
- Flux transfer event, in which high-energy solar particles flow through the Earth's magnetosphere
- Format-transforming encryption, a form of cryptography

== Transportation ==
- Comandante Armando Tola International Airport in El Calafate, Argentina
- Ford Tickford Experience, an Australian automotive marque
- Forum Train Europe, an international organisation in the field of rail transportation
- FTE automotive, a German automotive manufacturing company
