= Technical College, Basrah =

Iraqi university

Coordinates: 30°27′21″N 47°46′18″E

The Technical College, Basrah was established in 1994 in Basrah southern Iraq, belongs to Iraqi Foundation of Technical Education. It is currently part of Southern Technical University.

== Faculties ==
The college consists of five faculties:

- Faculty of Energy and Fuel Techniques
- Faculty of Petrochemical Techniques
- Faculty of Electrical Power Techniques
- Faculty of Refrigeration and Air Conditioning Techniques
- Faculty of Environment and Pollution

== See also ==
- List of Iraqi technical colleges and institutes
- Iran
