= List of Iraqi technical colleges and institutes =

== Technical colleges ==
- College of Health Technology
- Technical College, Baghdad
- Technical College, Basrah
- Technical College, Kirkuk
- Technical College, Mosayyab
- Technical College, Mosul
- Technical College, Najaf
- Technical College of Electricity
- Technical College for Management

== Technical institutes ==
- Technical Institute, Al Mansour
- Technical Institute, Zakho
- Technical Institute, Basrah
- Technical Institute, Ninawa
- Technical Institute, Mosul
- Technical Institute, Najaf
- Technical Institute, Kerbala
- Technical Institute, Amarah
- Technical Institute, Nasiriyah
- Technical Institute, Diwaniyah
- Technical Institute, Al Dur
- Technical Institute, Baquba
- Technical Institute, Hawija
- Technical Institute, Kufa
- Technical Institute Al Suwaira
- Technical Institute, Ramadi
- Management Institute, Rusafa
- Technical Institute, Shatrah
- Technical Institute, Musayyib
- Technical Institute, Samawah
- Technical Institute, Kut
- Technical Management Institute
- Technical Institute, Babel
- Technical Institute, Kirkuk
- Medical Technical Institute
- Teacher Training Institute
- Baghdad Technology Institute
- Institute of Applied Arts
- Raparin Technical and Vocational Institute

== See also ==
- Foundation of Technical Education
