= Tickford Vehicle Engineering =

Former Australian automotive company

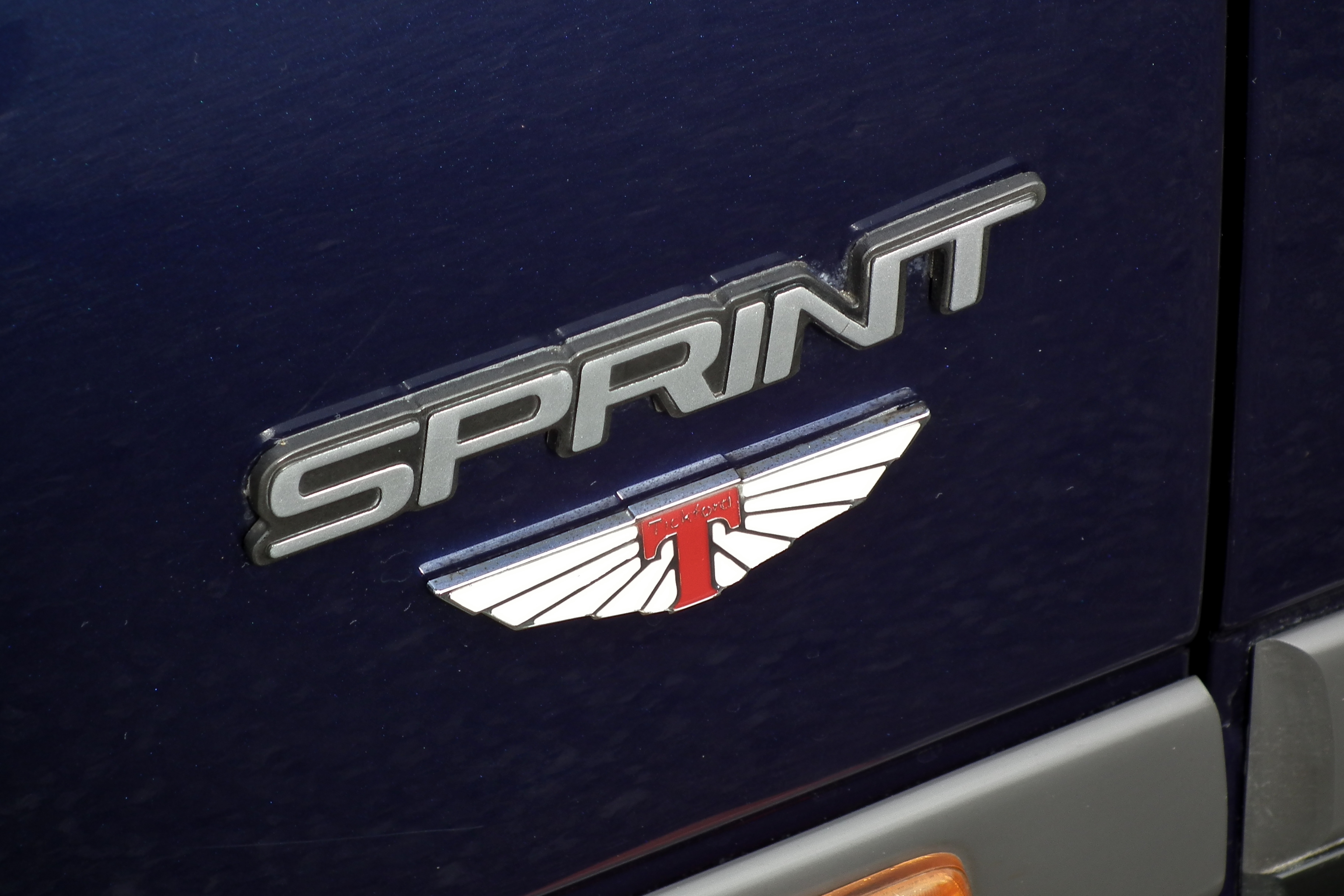
- The "Tickford wings" badge on a Ford Falcon XR8 Sprint
- Industry: Automotive
- Founded: 1991
- Defunct: 2002
- Headquarters: Melbourne, Victoria, Australia
- Products: Automobiles
- Owner: Ford Australia, Tickford

Tickford Vehicle Engineering (TVE) was a company responsible for numerous automotive projects and upgrades for Ford Australia between 1991 and 2002. In 1999, TVE setup Ford Tickford Experience (FTE) as a competitor to Holden Special Vehicles (HSV). In 2002, the operations changed to Ford Performance Vehicles (FPV), coinciding with Tickford's global operations being bought out by Prodrive.

== Overview ==
In 1990, 12 years since the last Falcon Cobra rolled off the line, Ford Australia started a worldwide search to find an engineering firm to establish a new performance arm in the same mold as rival to Holden Special Vehicles (HSV). The aim was to create a line-up of in-house performance cars that had been missing from the Falcon range since the 1970s. Ford Australia's last foray in this space was in fact represented by the 1982 XE-series "European Sports Pack" Falcon.

Throughout the late 1980s and early 1990s, this performance void was filled by third party tuning companies such as AVO, Special Vehicle Operations (SVO) and Dick Johnson Racing (DJR). Both AVO and DJR had experimented with using turbocharged powerplants to boost the output of Falcon's venerable 4.0-Litre 6-cylinder, with DJR creating the Grand Prix Turbo based on the XE. DJR had intended his company to be set up as a performance arm not unlike Peter Brock's Holden Dealer Team (HDT), but Ford was wary of such modifications due to warranty concerns. This meant that sales of both AVO and DJR Falcons remained very limited. SVO had greater success in the creation of a range of cars, starting with the Falcon EA series SVO (a car that formed the template for the subsequent XR6), however, Ford still did not provide factory-backing. Ultimately, Ford Australia joined forces with Tickford, renowned in Europe for its modified Ford models.

In 1991, Tickford Vehicle Engineering (TVE) was thus established as a joint venture between Ford Australia. TVE was involved in the creation of the Falcon XR range that emerged in 1992 with the EB series and the return of the Falcon GT. In addition, TVE was also responsible for other higher-specification Fords such as the Capri Clubsprint, and for the fitment of optional equipment such as LPG systems and sunroofs.

In 1999, aside from enhancing the Falcon offering via the sporty XR range, TVE also established Ford Tickford Experience (FTE) comprising a 3-tier sedan-only T series based on the then new AU series. Managing Director, David Flint, made clear this brand's intentions by stating: "Tickford have helped add further refinement, safety and confidence to the T Series range. It is very easy to build a car that just goes fast, but one that handles, performs and lends itself to outstanding driving dynamics is what we have aimed for'." In so doing, whilst the brand was an obvious attempt to combat the successful HSV products, FTE did not want to get into a "power war", focusing instead in providing a more sophisticated high performance product, making refinement its hallmark.

Aside from Falcon-based products, over the years, FTE was also responsible for a right hand drive (RHD) conversion of the fourth-generation Mustang Cobra and for promoting the European Cougar. In 1999, TVE also bought out Glen Seton Racing to create Ford Tickford Racing – Ford's first factory-backed team in over 30 years.

With the purchase of Tickford by Prodrive in 2001, FTE was replaced by the new owner's Ford Performance Vehicles (badges as "FPV") with the introduction of the BA series Falcon range in 2002. Nevertheless, Tickford were still involved in the early development stages of some models including the BA Falcon XR6 Turbo, with early parts bearing the "Tickford" badge.The race team Ford Tickford Racing was renamed Ford Performance Racing in 2003.

In 2016, The Prodrive Racing Australia division reformed Tickford to offer high performance upgrades to the Australian imported Ford Mustang, Ranger and Everest.This was a result of Ford Australia shutting down local production, ending the Falcon model and discontinuing the Ford Performance Vehicles brand. Ford Performance Racing was renamed Tickford Racing in 2017.

== Falcon XR range ==
This range of models – not to be confused with the 1966–1968 XR series – has been a fixture of the Falcon range since 1991. From its second release in 1993, it has become characterised by, and is distinguishable from standard models thanks to, a signature quad-headlamp front styling. In addition, all factory LPG systems for the EF and EL Falcon range were installed by and badged "Tickford".

=== EB series ===
In July 1991, just prior to the formation of TVE, Ford Australia itself launched the EB Falcon S-XR8 after its decision to offer again a V8 engine option for the first time since the 1982 XE-series.

In 1992, TVE became responsible of the whole range. The S-XR6 model was identified by a red rocker cover with the "Tickford wings" badge, a revised head and cam saw a power increase from 148 to 161 kW (198 to 216 hp). The S-XR8 was visually similar but was powered by the standard 5.0-Litre "Windsor" V8 engine. With the EBII, TVE launched an enhanced XR8 model. Both the 6 and 8 cylinder models were fitted with anti-lock brakes, limited-slip differential, alloy wheels and a Momo steering wheel being standard on the S-XR6 and optional on the S-XR8.

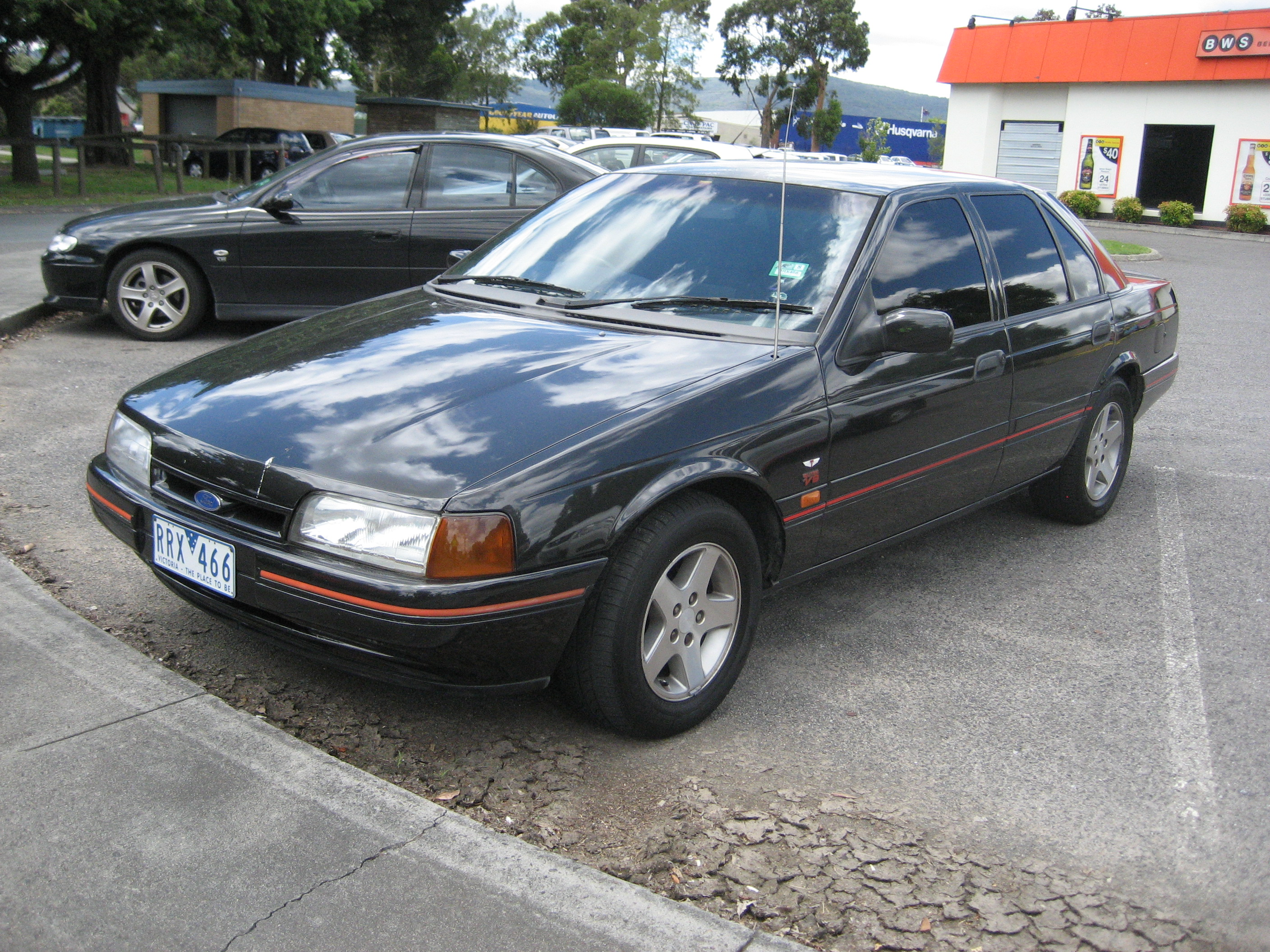
EB Falcon S-XR8

=== ED series ===
With this series, TVE dropped the 'S' from its range and introduced the Falcon XR's signature four-headlamp treatment, inspired by the European Ford Escort RS Cosworth.

The model range comprised the XR6, the XR8 – and from September 1993 – the XR8 Sprint. The latter featured a more powerful 195 kW (261 hp) version of the 5.0-litre "Windsor" V8 engine, courtesy of the performance upgrades fitted to the previous year's Falcon GT "25th Anniversary". The same GT also donated an improved suspension and brake package, whilst featuring unique 16-inch wheels. There was very little body alteration to identify it, other than a black (instead of red) side body strip, a pair of subtle front wheel arch moulds and "Sprint" badges on the boot and a front chin spoiler.

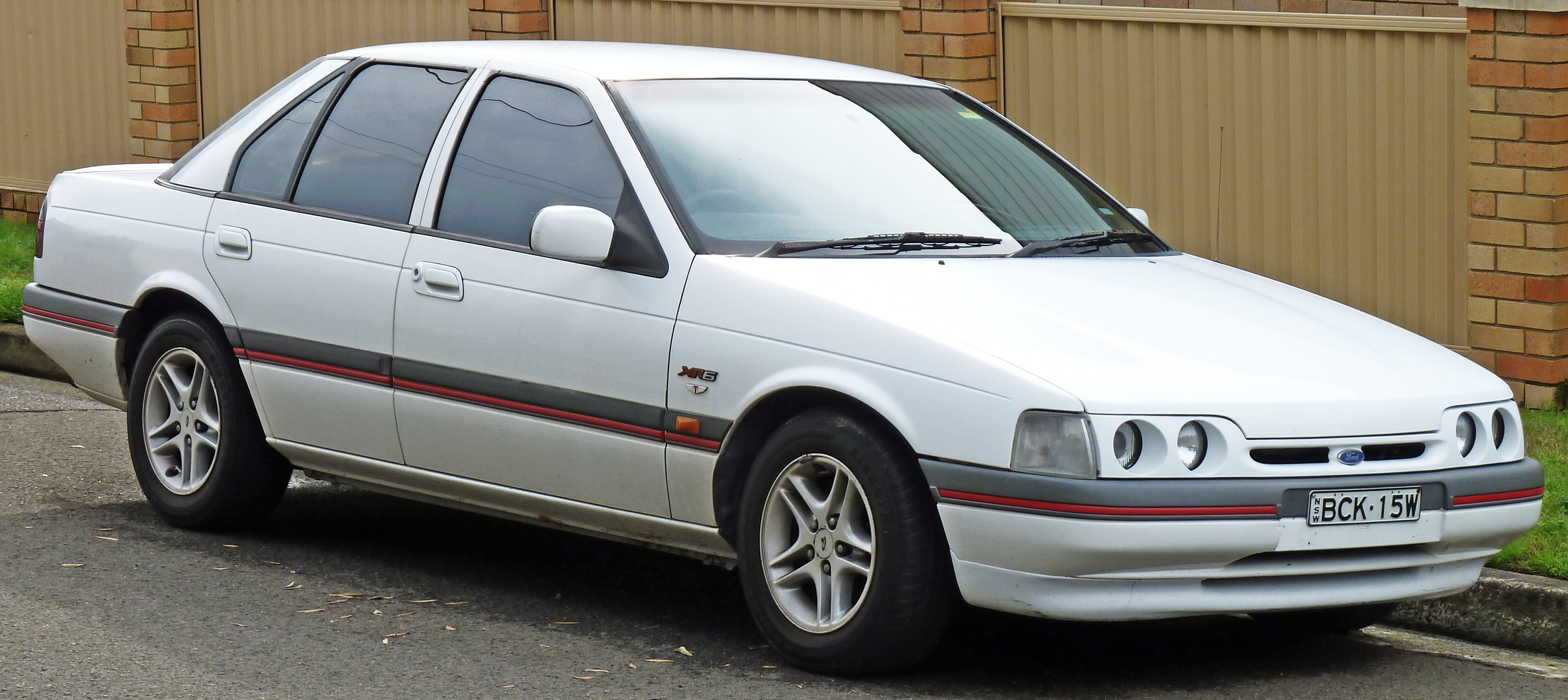
ED Falcon XR6

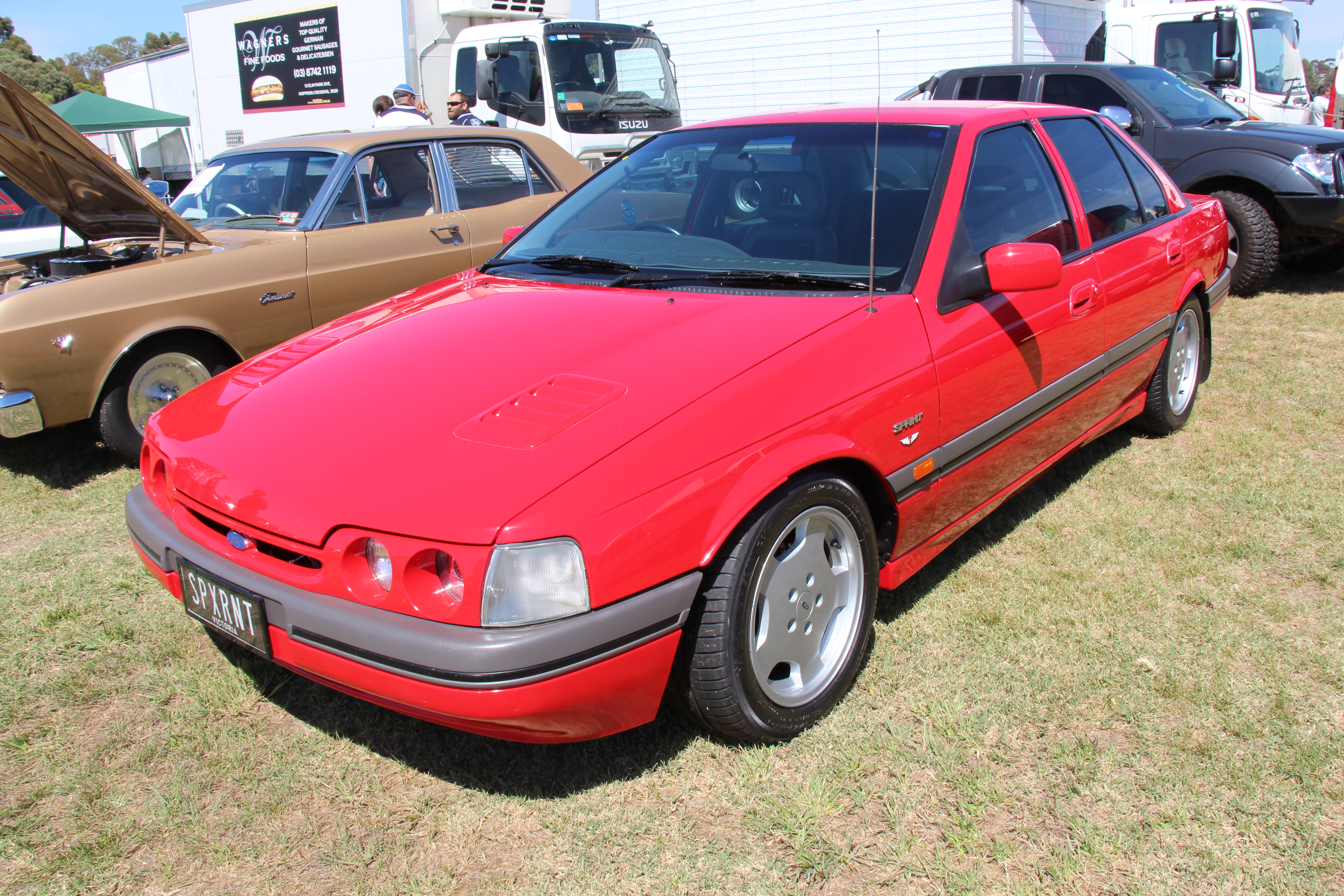
ED Falcon XR8 Sprint

=== EF series ===
The XR6 and XR8 models continued with the heavily re-engineered EF series Falcon, with more improvements to the suspension and drive-line. The XR range now received a 1-piece nose cone including quad headlamp surrounds, bumper and a blanked out grille similar to the base Gli model. "Cats scratch" vents were applied to the bonnet.

The XR6 continued to use the same 4.0-litre inline six-cylinder shared with the base models but with Tickford alloy cylinder heads, cam and higher pressure valve springs with unique Tickford EEC programming. A press bent 2.5-inch exhaust was also added, a minor upgrade over the standard 2.25-inch system. The six-cylinder Ghia version also received the motor out of the XR6, with a quieter exhaust system.

The XR6 delivers 164 kW (220 hp) at 5000 rpm up from 161 kW (216 hp) in the ED Falcon. The XR8 has a 5.0-litre OHV (over head valve) V8 delivering 170 kW (228 hp) at 4500 rpm up from the 165 kW (221 hp). LPG was not offered as a factory option on the XR6 and XR8 models

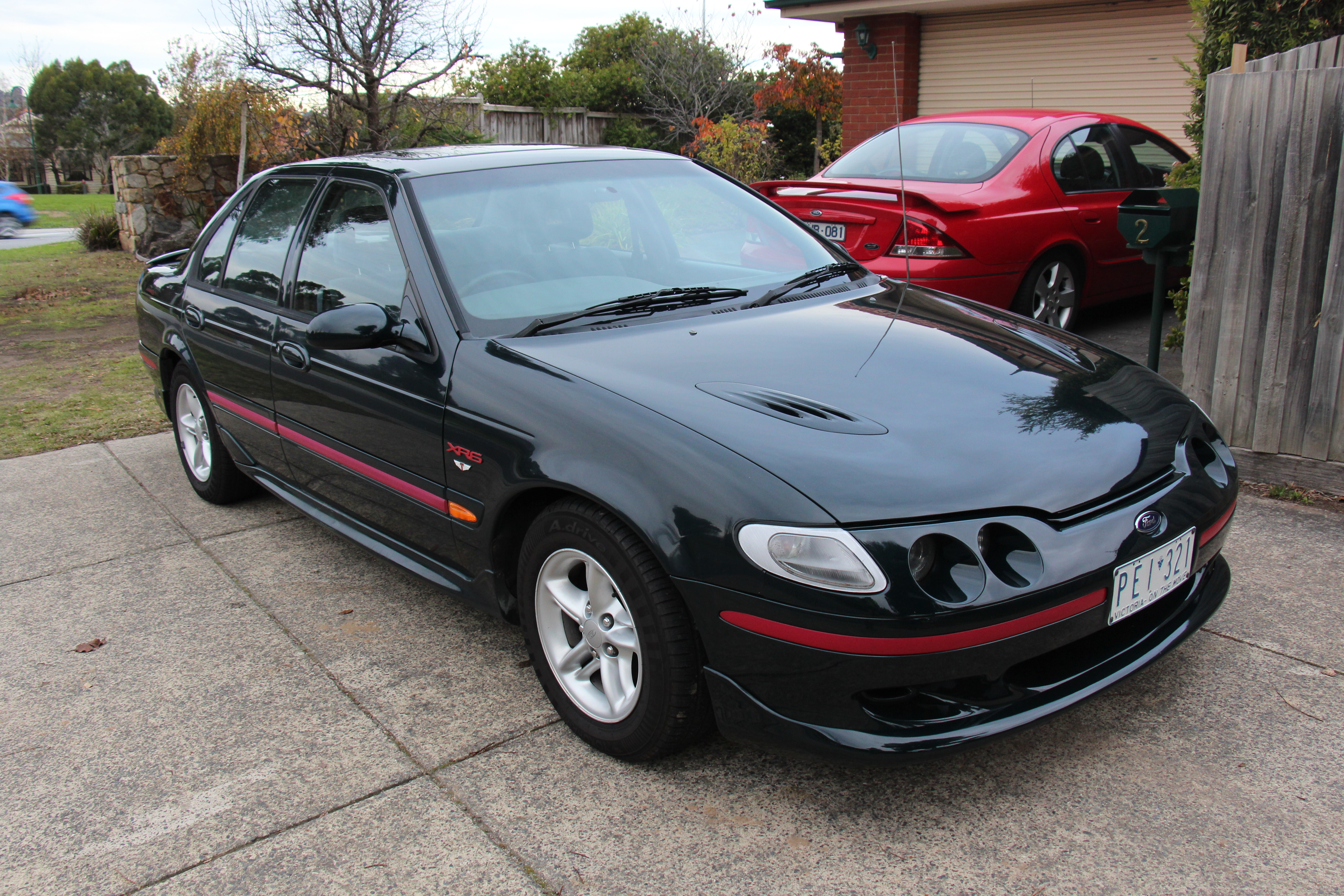
EF Falcon XR6

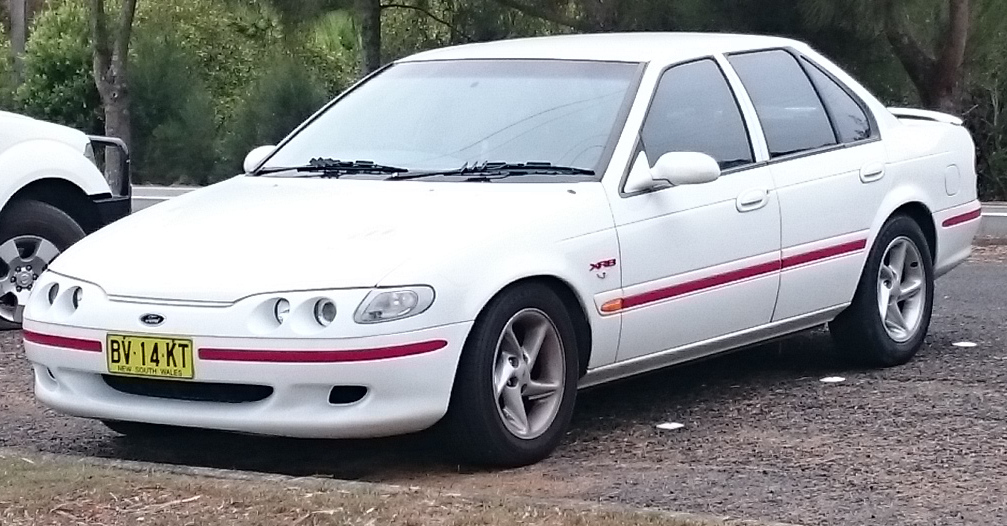
EF Falcon XR8

=== EL Series ===
New frontal styling arrived with the EL, with the nose cone featuring slightly revised headlights and a slotted grille. The "cat scratch" vents found on the EF were now replaced with simplified versions on the EL.

The XR6 received the same changes found in the rest of the EL range (coil-pack changed to distributor, a wide, single intake pipe opposed to the flat twin pipe of the EF). The XR6 and XR8 boasted a 164 kW (220 hp) six-cylinder and a 170 kW (228 hp) V8 respectively. In October 1997, the V8 engine fitted to the XR8 sports model was upgraded from 170 kilowatts (228 hp) to 185 (248 hp). Torque figures were also upped from 398 newton metres (294 ft·lbf) to 402 (296 ft·lbf)

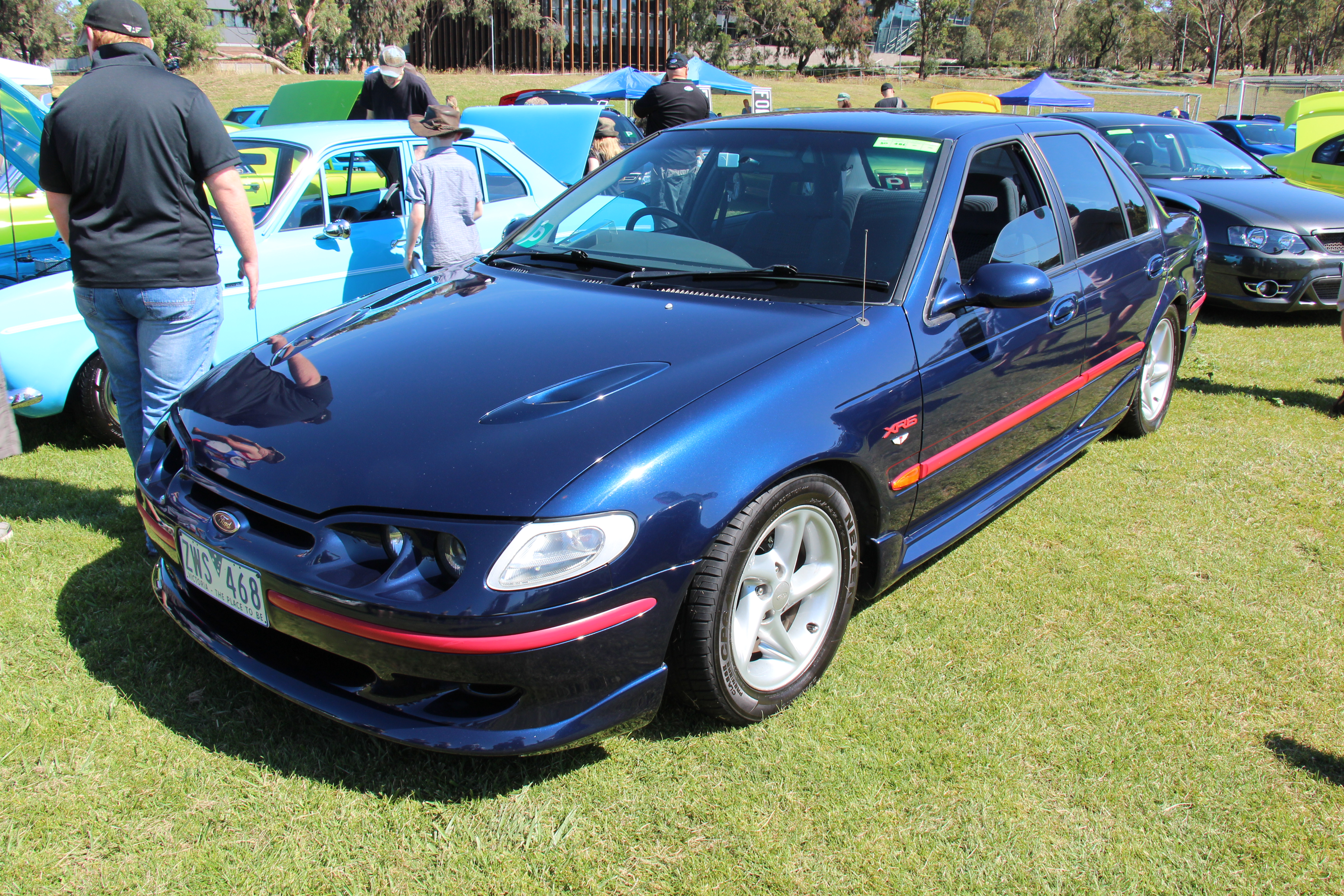
EL Falcon XR6

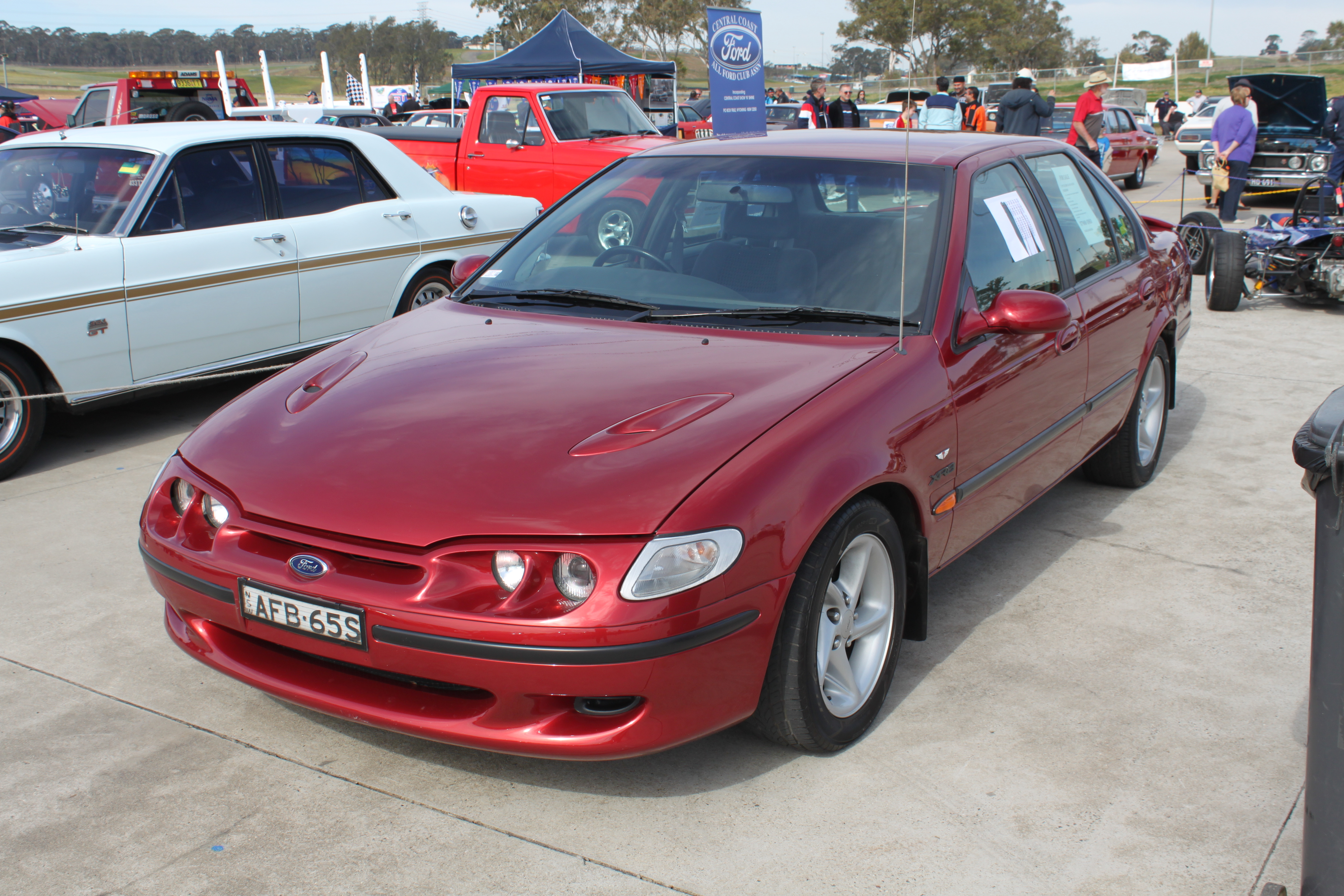
EL Falcon XR8

=== AU series ===
With this new-generation Falcon, TVE retained the XR8 but split the 6-cylinder range into the XR6 HP and XR6 VCT depending on engine variant. The XR6 HP was equipped with a 164 kW (220 hp) version of the new Intech engine (as opposed to 157 kW (211 hp) of the standard engine) thanks to: a unique cylinder head; a reshaped inlet port; a redesigned exhaust port; an ‘open’ combustion chamber shape to restrict pre-detonation from hot spot areas; a unique camshaft; higher fuel pressure; and a recalibrated EEC V engine management system. It also had a solid rear axle suspension setup unlike the independent rear suspension of the 172 kW (231 hp) XR6 VCT, which also featured variable cam timing. The VCT engine was an Australian-production first.

In 2001, TVE also built 125 units of the XR8 Rebel, which were characterised by a Ford Racing bodykit (instead of the standard Tickford version) and, more importantly, the 220 kW (300 hp) "Synergy 5000" 5.0-Litre V8 version of the "Windsor" engine from the FTE T series. With this limited edition XR8, Ford also provided a Sony PlayStation 2 console with a copy of Gran Turismo 3: A-spec signed by both Glenn Seton and Steven Richards as part of the package. The AU III series XR8 inherited the same 220 kW (295 hp) V8 engine as standard and the Ford Racing bodykit as an option to the standard Tickford version. A limited edition XR6 VCT Sprint also received the Ford Motorsport bodykit.

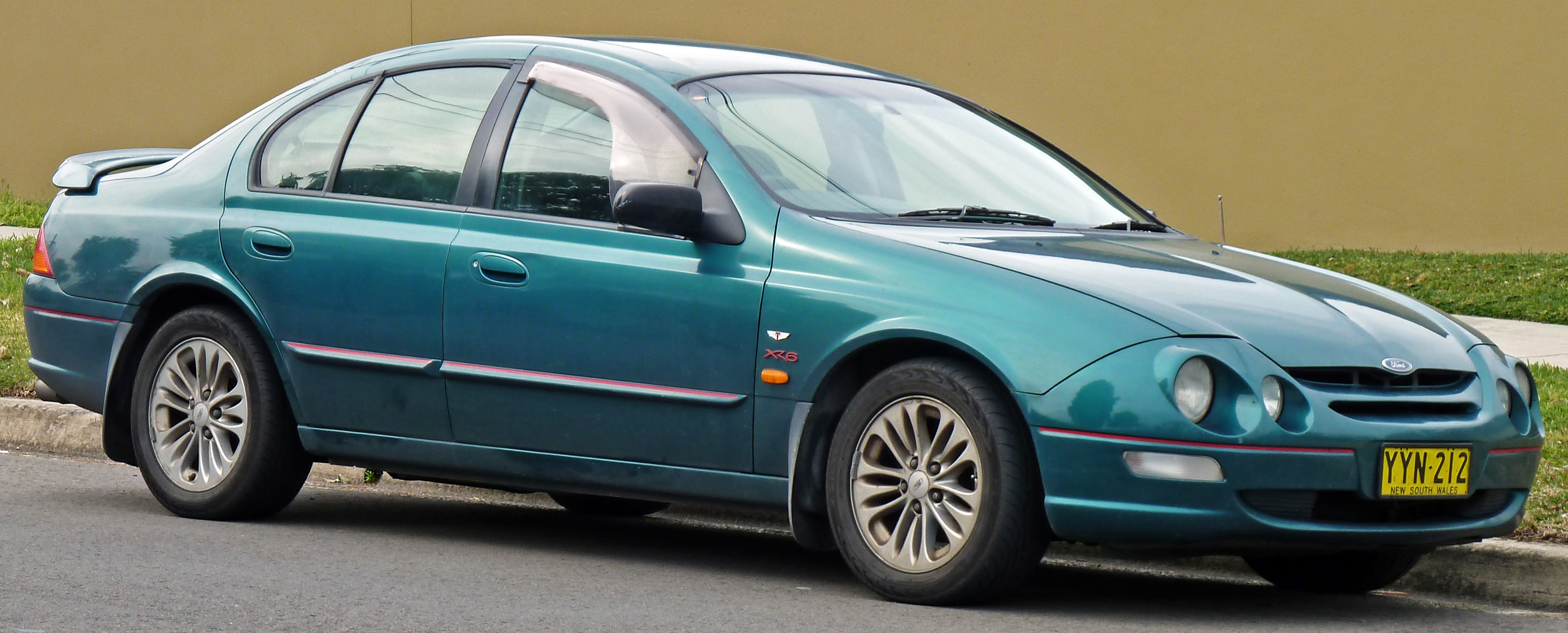
AU Falcon XR6

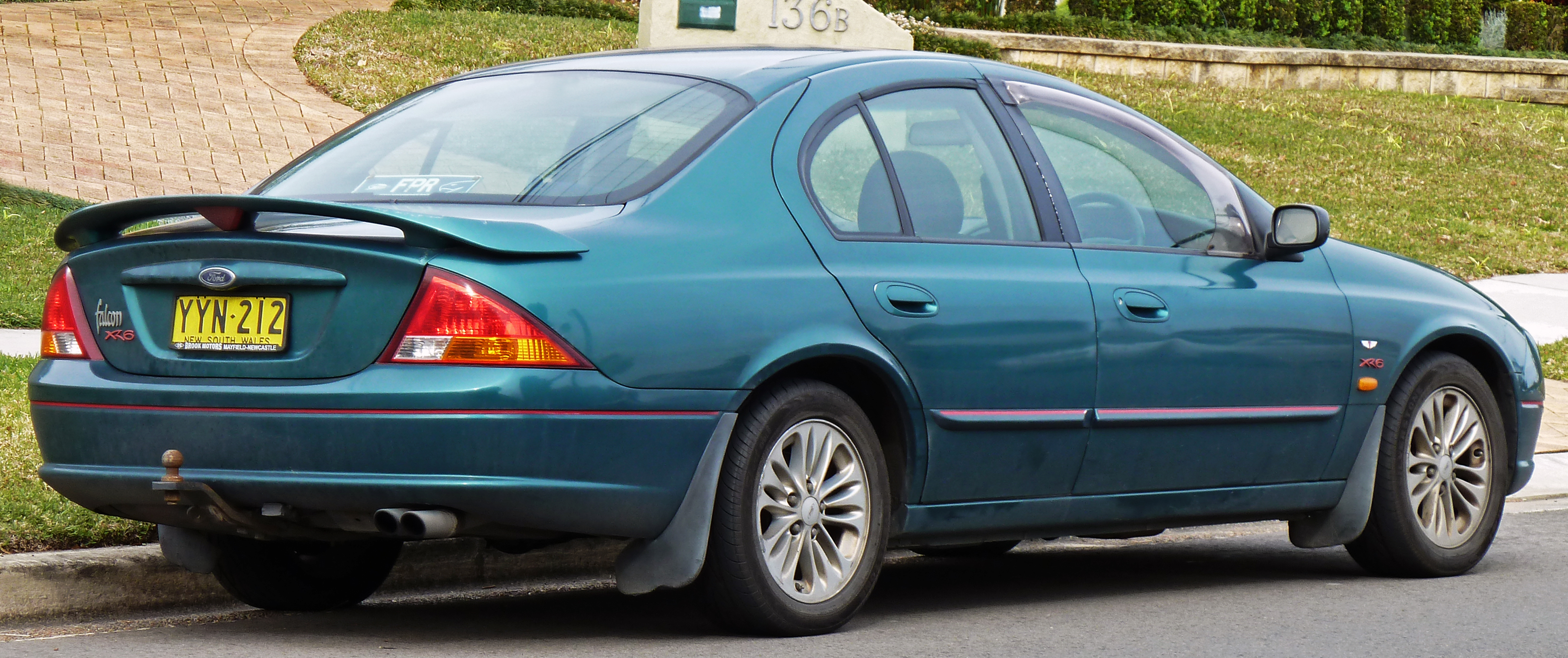
AU Falcon XR6

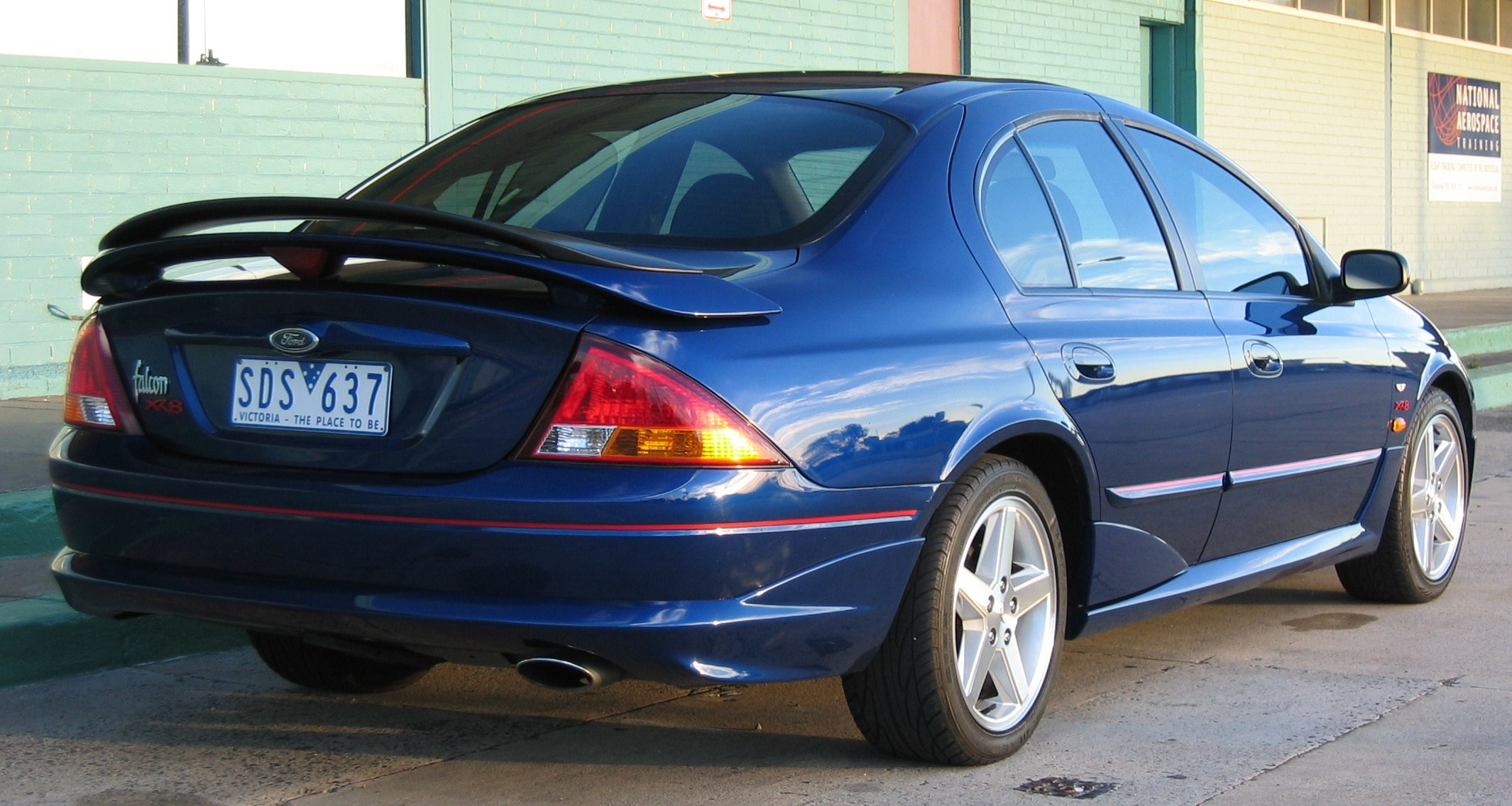
AU Falcon XR8 (with optional body kit and dual rear wing)

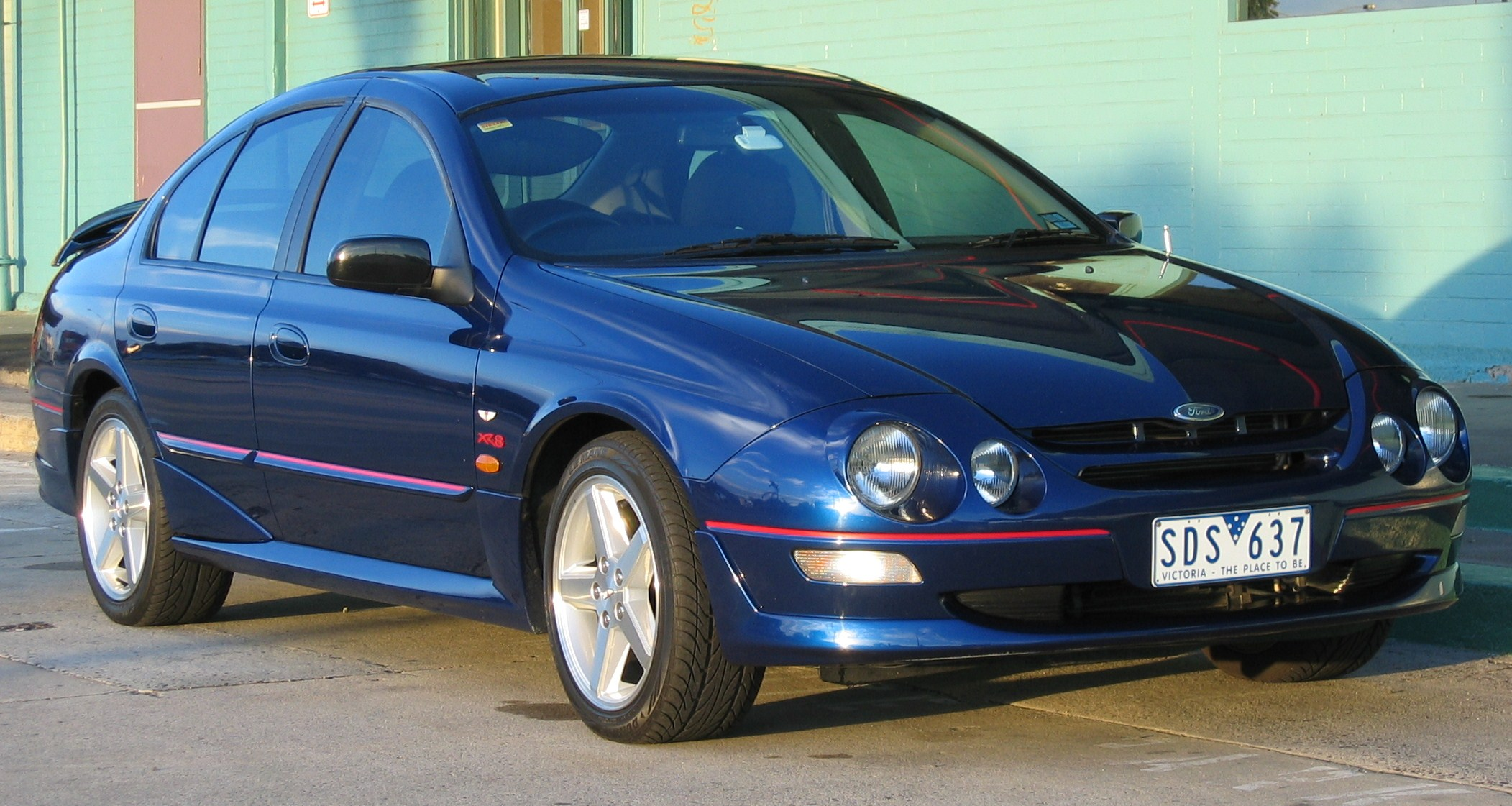
AU Falcon XR8 (with optional bodykit)

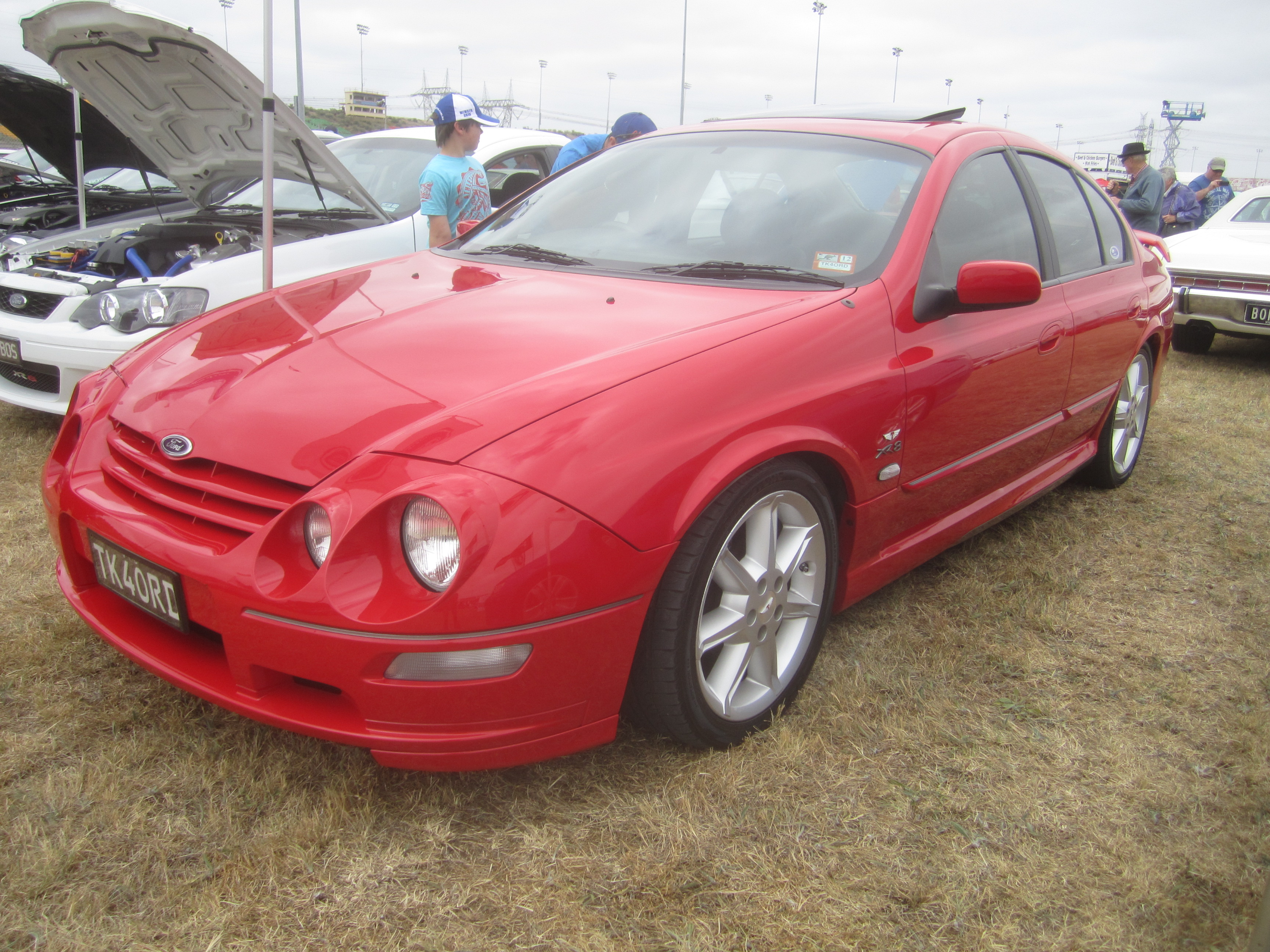
AU Falcon XR8 Rebel

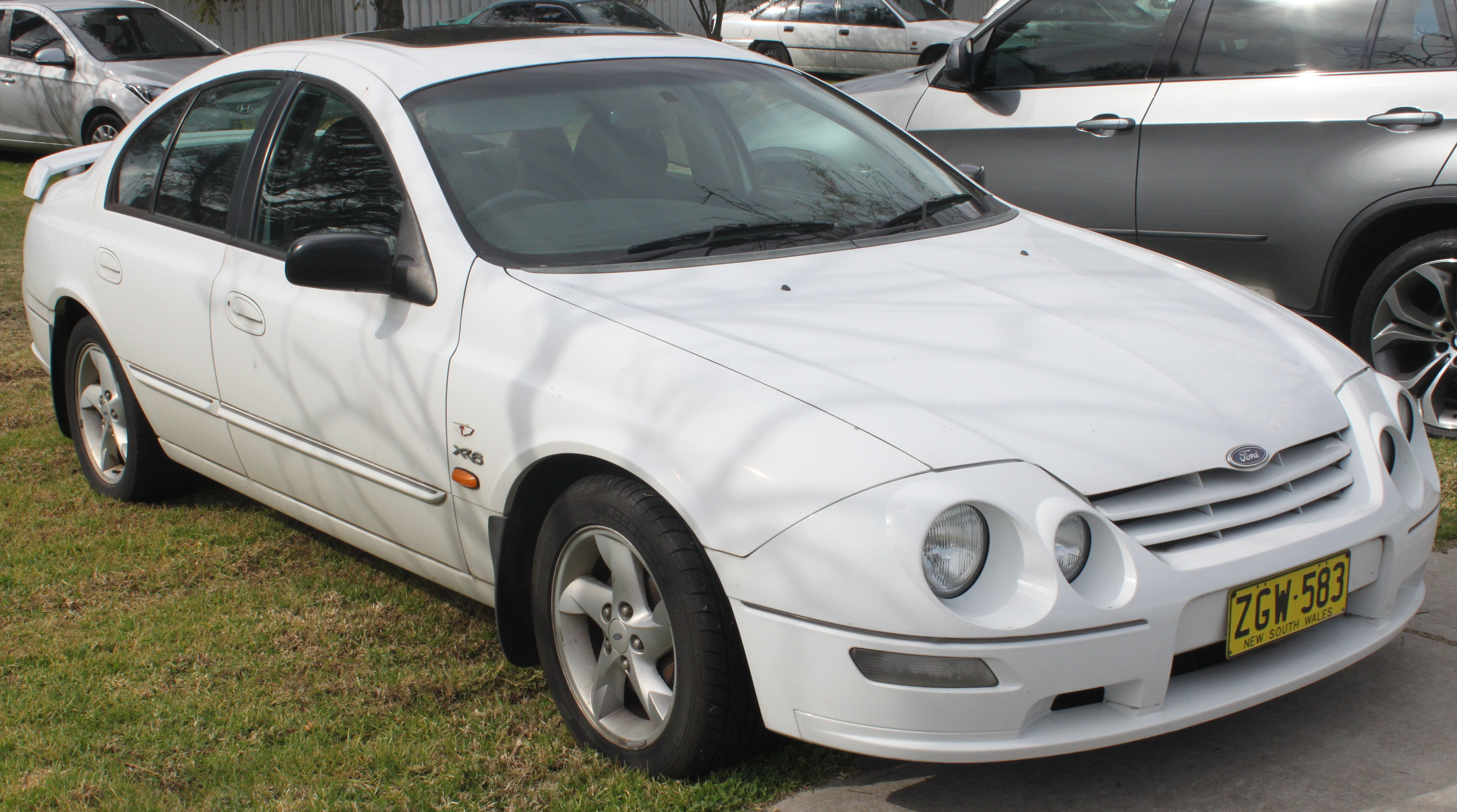
AU II XR6

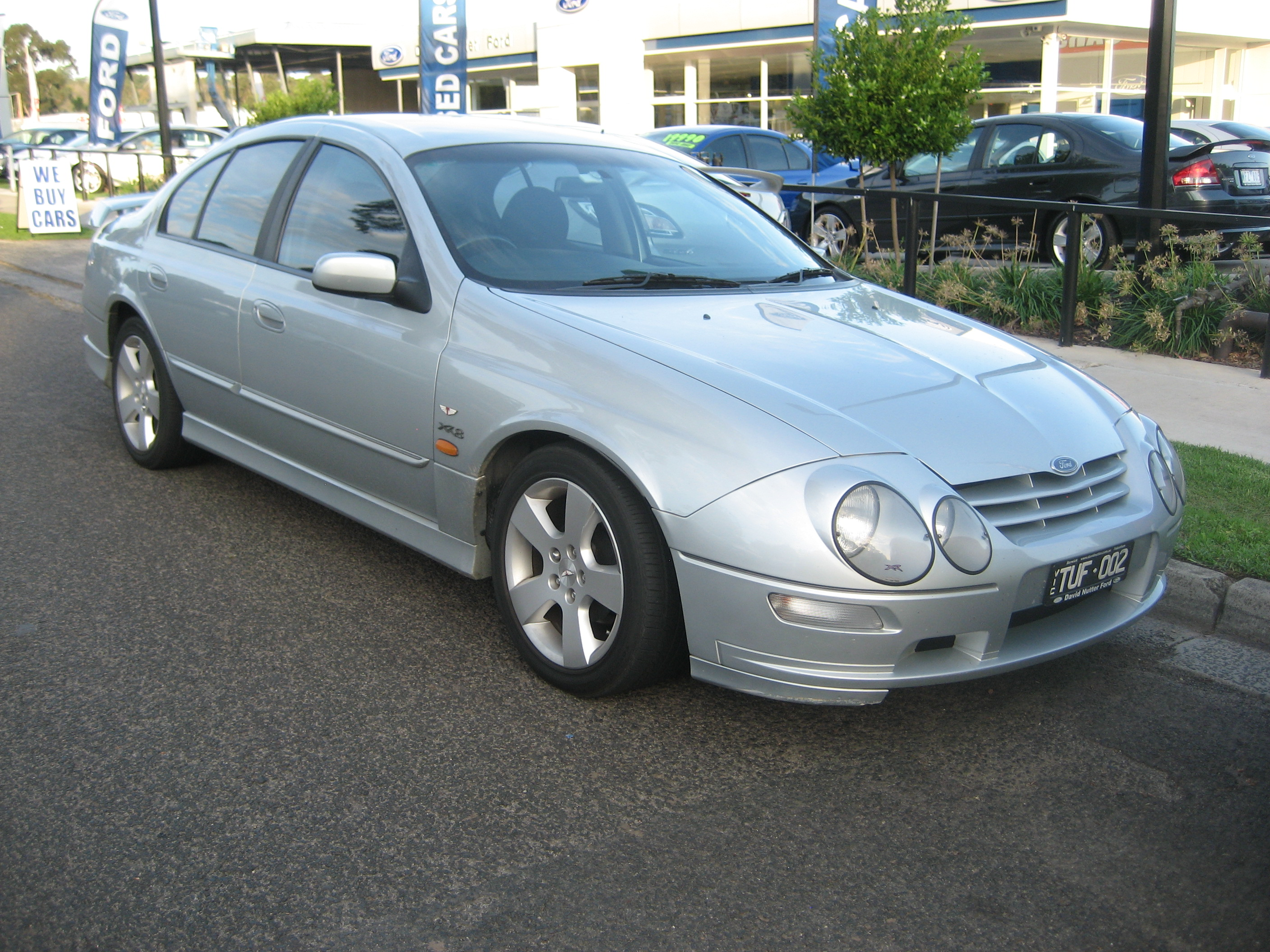
AU II Falcon XR8

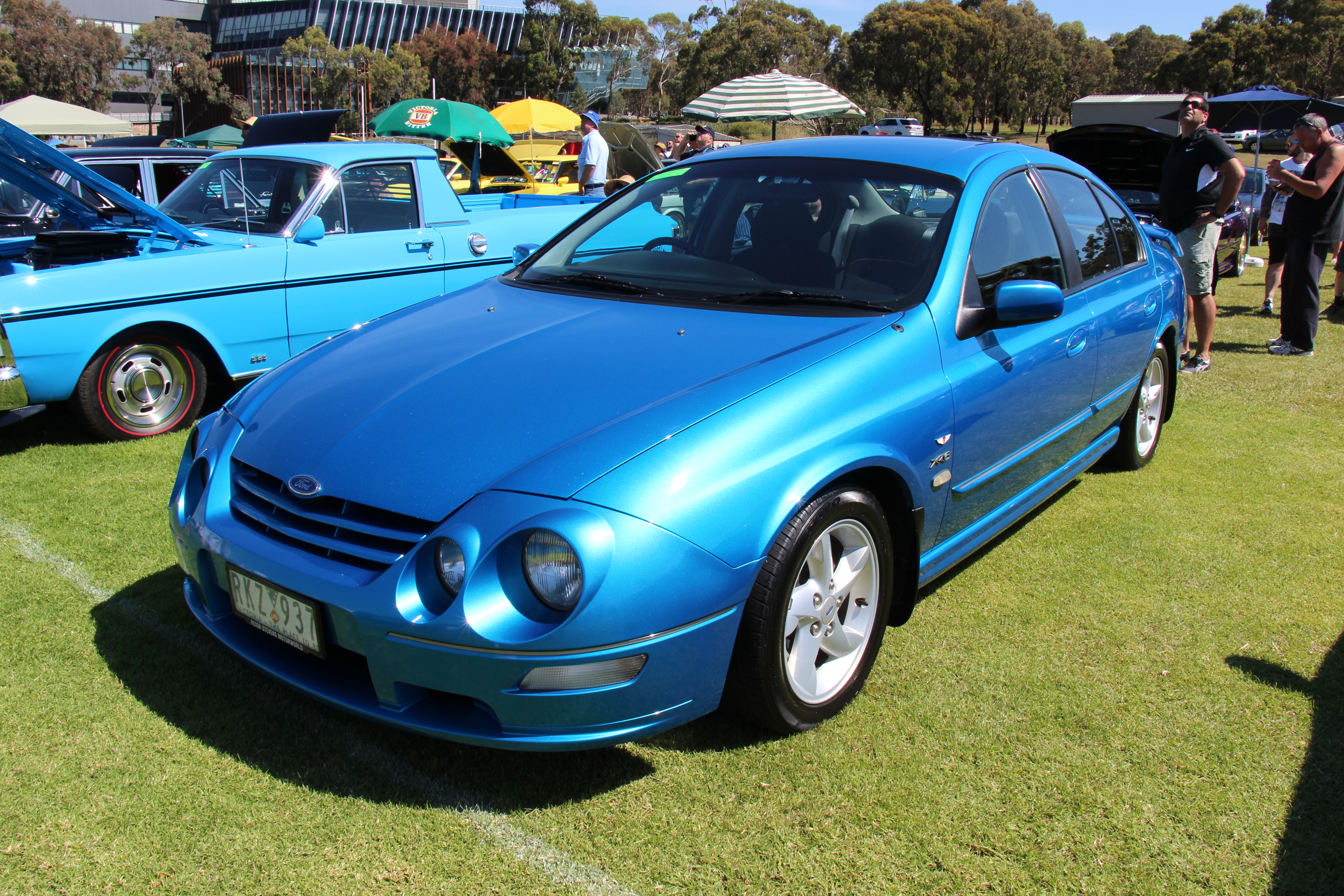
AU III Falcon XR6

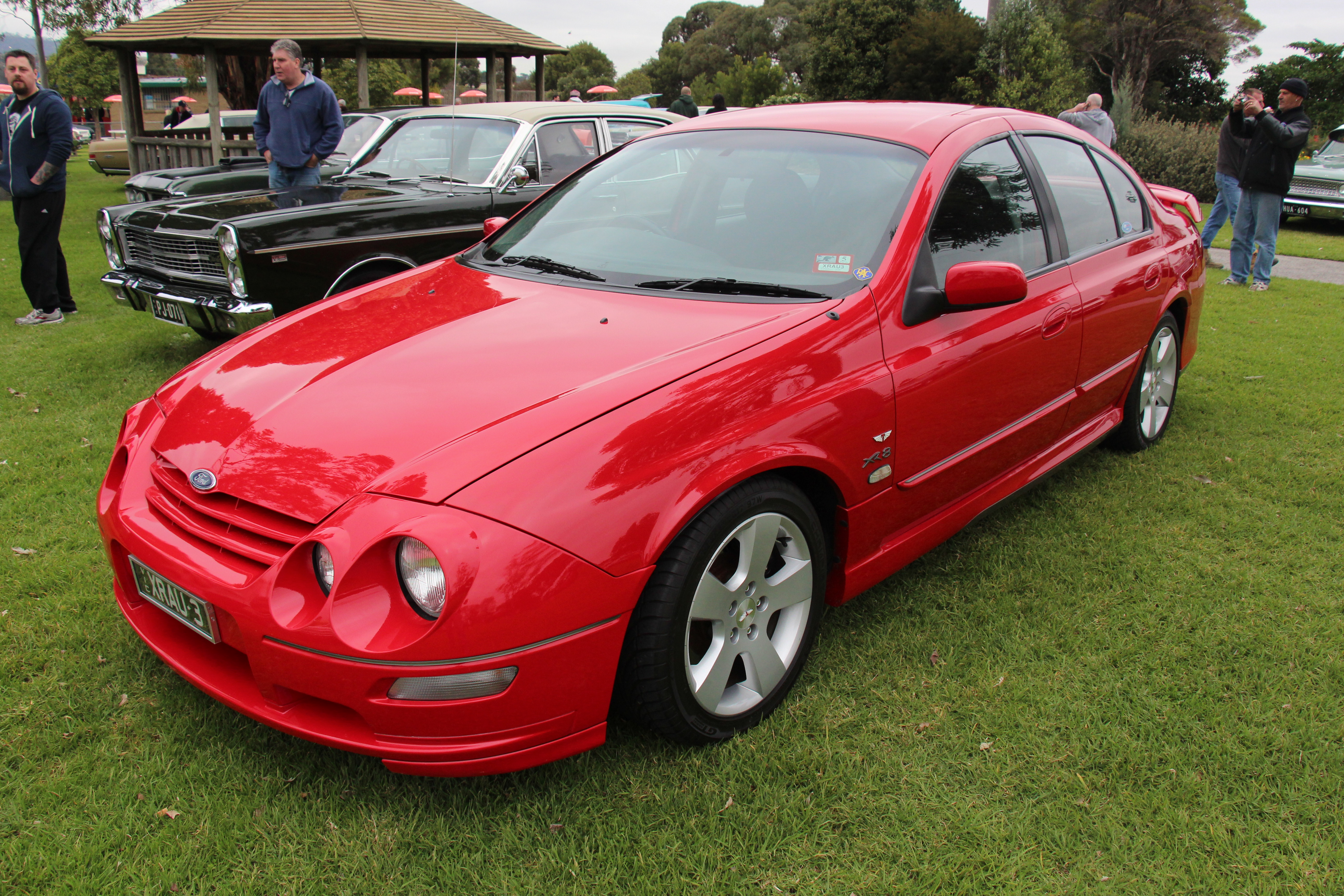
AU III Falcon XR8

== Falcon GT (EB & EL series) ==
In 1990, Ford Australia produced an EA Falcon concept that featured a 5.8-Litre (351 cubic inch) "Windsor" V8 and race prepared suspension to give it the handling to match its acceleration. This car, however, never reached production. The fitment of the larger "Windsor" engine required substantial alterations to the engine bay to fit the engine, making the exercise too costly. Nevertheless, with the launch of the EB series in 1991, and for the first time since 1982, a V8 returned to the Falcon range thanks to a 5.0-Litre version of the "Windsor" engine. With the return of this powerplant and with TVE on board, Ford deemed it an appropriate time to bring back the legendary Falcon GT model. Thus, TVE produced a 25th Anniversary and 30th Anniversary models based on the luxury-oriented Fairmont Ghia models, rather than the sportier XR. The result was a proper Grand Tourer, with considerable driver comfort, instead of the high-powered setup of its predecessors.

25th Anniversary GT
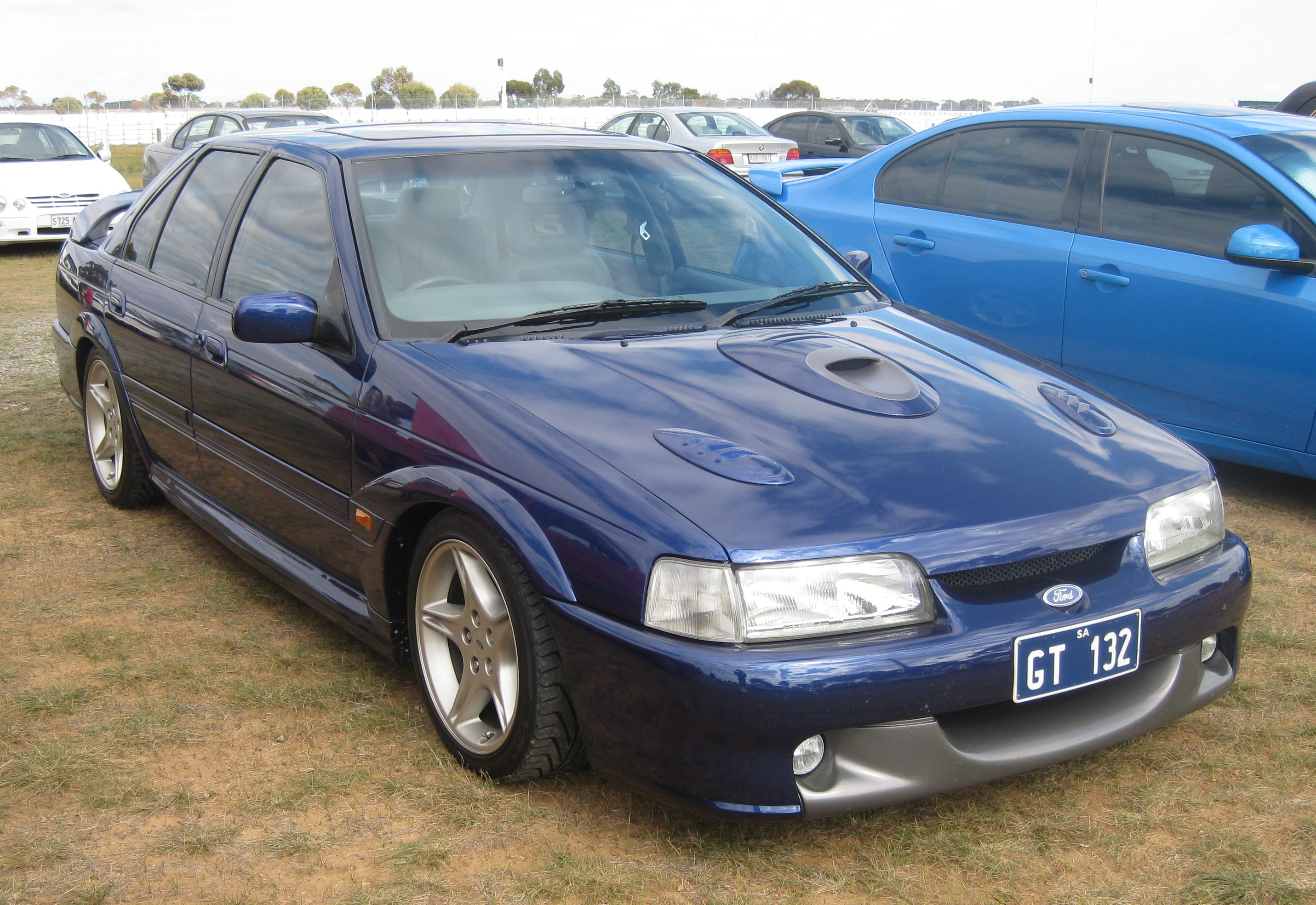

Overview
- Manufacturer: Tickford / Ford Australia
- Production: 1992

Body and chassis
- Class: Full-size car
- Body style: 4-door sedan

Powertrain
- Engine: 5.0 L Windsor V8
- Transmission: 5-speed manual 4-speed automatic

Chronology
- Predecessor: Falcon GT (XB series)
- Successor: Falcon GT (EL series)

=== "25th Anniversary" ===
Based on the EB series, the Falcon GT "25th Anniversary" was launched in 1992, after a month from the release of the S-XR6 and XR8 models. Production of this model totalled 265 units, 15 of which were sold in New Zealand. It commemorated 25 years since the introduction of the very first GT in 1967 (based on the XR series Falcon) and was also the first the badge was used on a production Falcon since the last GT of 1973 (based on the XB series).

Body

The body featured a full bodykit designed by Paul Gibson, who worked on the Ford Escort RS Cosworth. The bodykit was tested in a wind tunnel in England to ensure that the additions improved aerodynamic performance. The end product was reminiscent of the Lotus Carlton, which was based on the Opel Omega that formed the basis of the rival, second-generation Holden Commodore.

Mechanicals

The GT received the Mustang Cobra version of the 5.0-Litre "Windsor", with Tickford adapting it for local conditions. The 200 kW (270 hp) was the result of changes to the camshaft, intake and cylinder head improvements. The rest of the drivetrain consisted of regular XR components including manual transmission, with the only changes being slightly different gear ratios and recalibrated shift points for the automatic transmission.

Performance

5-speed manual transmission (source: Wheels, November 1992)

- 0–100 km/h (0–62 mph) in 7.57 seconds
- 1/4 mile in 15.48 seconds
- Top speed: 222 km/h (138 mph)

Units sold by colour

- Black Pearl (J4): 109 of which 4 were exported
- Cobalt Blue (J9): 88 of which 5 were exported
- Cardinal Red (G5): 68 of which 6 were exported

Trim option: Ironbark (G3)

30th Anniversary GT
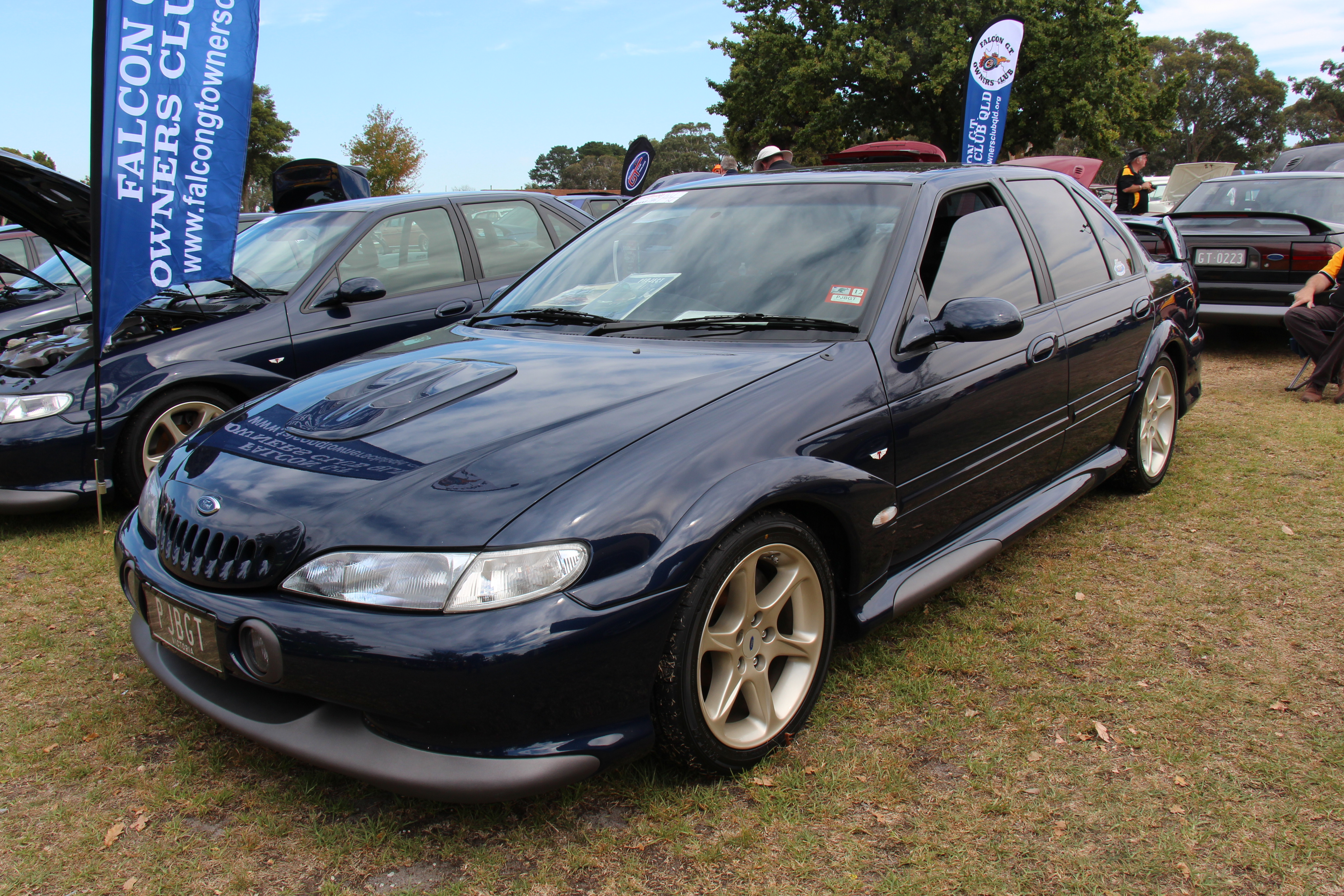

Overview
- Manufacturer: Tickford / Ford Australia
- Production: 1997

Body and chassis
- Class: Full-size car
- Body style: 4-door sedan

Powertrain
- Engine: 5.0 L Windsor V8
- Transmission: 5-speed manual 4-speed automatic

Chronology
- Predecessor: EB GT
- Successor: BA GT

=== "30th Anniversary" ===
Launched in 1997, this commemorative model was an evolution of its 1992 predecessor, this time based on the then new EL series. Production of the Falcon GT "30th Anniversary" totalled 272 units (150 manuals; 122 automatics), comprising 11 development cars (build allocation P001 to P011), 239 (build allocation 001 to 239 and with a limit of 4 per dealers) for Australia, 20 exported to New Zealand (build allocation NZ01 to NZ20) and 2 exported to South Africa (build allocation 240 and 241).

Body

The EL GT was quite well known for its outlandish looks, penned by then Ford Australia's design chief, Steve Park (also responsible for the ill-fated AU series Falcon). His original sketch had a silhouette akin to that of a Batmobile with a wilder wing consisting of a circular stop light mounted on a protruding centre post. However, Ford engineers opted for a more balanced approach to form and function.

One of the most distinctive and polarising features was grille consisting of a vertical stacks, which lead the automotive media to name this car "Darth Vader". Again, the bodykit was not just there for looks but was developed at the Monash University (alongside the EL Falcon race car program) wind tunnel to improve aerodynamics. The rear wing was said to greatly reduce aerodynamic lift at speed, and unique bonnet vents were placed in a low pressure area to help engine cooling. Wheel arch extensions were used to cover the wider EL GT 6-spoke alloy wheels.

Mechanicals

The 5.0-Litre "Windsor" engine was locally developed in TVE's workshop. It featured a significantly re-calibrated ECU, bigger SVO GT40 cylinder heads and new 42mm headers. As a result, it produced 200 kW (268 hp) and 470 N⋅m (347 lb⋅ft). TVE had considered using the 351ci version of the "Windsor" found in the EA series GT prototype, and a higher displacement version. Both projects were shelved due to the associated high costs. One of the unique features of this GT model was the special adaptive mode of its 4-speed automatic transmission developed by BTR. A computer monitored a number of inputs to select one of 5 different shift protocols, adapting to the driver's own style. To allow 30th Anniversary GT to be driven in excess of 180 km/h (112 mph), a carbon-wrapped aluminium tail shaft was installed to eliminate the flex commonly found in standard Falcons. In July 1998, Wheels magazine reached a top speed of 232 km/h (144 mph).

Suspension

The car featured a front end setup unique to the model, consisting of re-shaped cast uprights to allow the use of larger discs (328mm instead of 287mm on regular falcons). Twin pot callipers were also used in place of the standard single pot.

Performance

5-speed manual transmission (claimed)

- 0–100 km/h (0–62 mph) in 6.97 seconds
- 1/4 mile in 14.97 seconds
- Standing km: 208.8 km/h
- Top speed: 230 km/h (143 mph)

4-speed adaptive automatic transmission (claimed)

- 0–100 km/h (0–62 mph) in 7.73 seconds
- 1/4 mile in 15.65 seconds
- Standing km: 201.8 km/h
- Top speed: 226 km/h (140 mph)

Units sold by colour

- Sparkling Burgundy (B5): 157 of which 14 were exported
- Heritage Green (E3): 63 of which 5 were exported
- Navy Blue (N9): 52 of which 3 were exported

Trim option: Mako Grey (G3)

Ford "Fairlane By Tickford" (FBT)
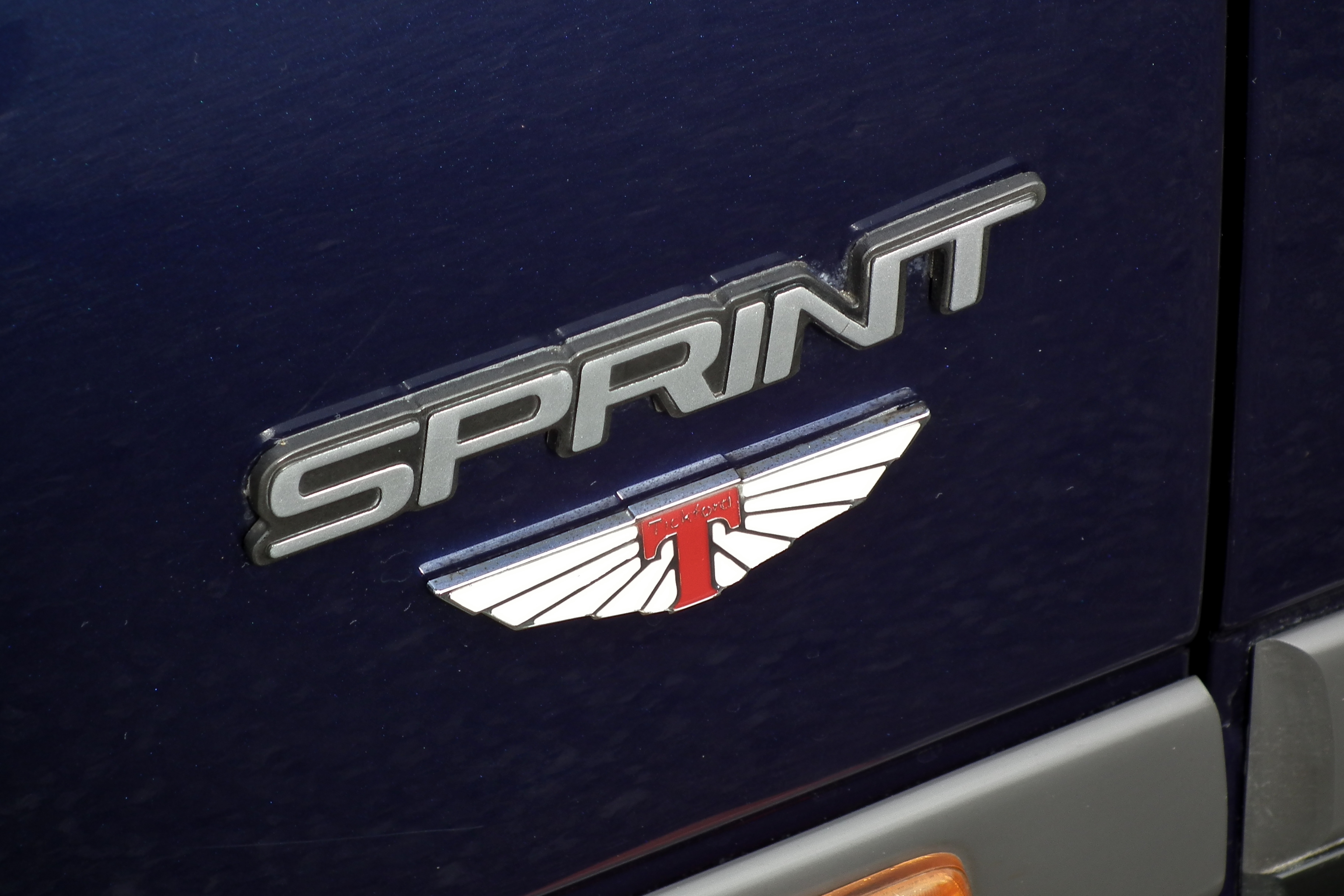
- Industry: Automotive
- Founded: 1999
- Headquarters: Melbourne, Victoria, Australia
- Products: Automobiles
- Owner: Ford Australia, Tickford
- Website: www.fpv.com.au

== FTE T-Series. TE50, TS50, TL50 ==
This V8 sedan-only range consisted of three levels: the short wheelbase TE50 and TS50 and the long wheelbase TL50. A distinguishing feature of the T series was a "FTE Premium Assist" package to enhance the ownership experience.

Broadly speaking, the TL50 was based on the Ford Fairlane and the TS50 on the Fairmont Ghia. They all featured a "Premium" braking system. By contrast, the T1 and T2 series TE50 was based on a Fairmont (down to its velour-trimmed interior), however, in T2 series the TE50's braking system was downgraded to that of the Falcon XR8 (the "Premium" braking system becoming optional but standard again on the T3 series), and the T3 also inherited the Falcon XR8 dashboard but with a leather-trimmed only interior. An upgraded "Premium" braking system was otherwise standard on every TS50 and TL50.

=== T-Series, AU (T1) ===
The first FTE followed the launch of the brand-new AU series Falcon a month later, in October 1998. The controversial looks of the donor car were lessened courtesy of better designed bumper bars and larger wheels, as well as more luxurious interiors, at least on the TS50 and TL50 models.

Body

Each model featured a styling kit that consisted of unique front and rear bumper bars and side skirts. A key distinguishing feature was the large chrome-mesh grille and "T" badges throughout. To identify the separate Falcon-based models, each had a unique front fascia, with the TS50 gaining driving lights in place of the brake ducts of the TE50. The TE50 had 17-inch wheels whereas the TS50 and TL50 went up to 18-inch. Aiming for a more sophisticated look compared to its rival HSV, FTE fit only low-profile rear wings on the Falcon-derived models and no wing on the more luxury-oriented TL50. Paint options were limited to Silhouette (black), Liquid Silver and Sparkling Burgundy on the TS50 and TL50; with the TE50 having an additional option: Galaxy (metallic dark blue).

Mechanicals

All T Series models used the familiar Windsor V8 Engine renamed "Synergy 5000", but was hand built to provide more power over the XR8's standard 185 kW (248 hp) and it also feature an engraved plaque with the signature of its builder. The TE50 and TL50 models were equipped with a 200 kW (268 hp) version, whilst the TS50 gained aluminium cylinder heads, a larger throttle body and a revised camshaft to produce 220 kW (295 hp). The TE50 was available with a 5-speed manual or optional 4-speed automatic transmission. This transmission was the only choice on the TS50 and TL50. Along with being combined with traction control, the 4-speed automatic had ESS (Electronic Sports Shift), which was an Australian-production first by providing buttons on the steering wheels allowing for manual gear shifting. Inside, each car featured Momo steering wheels and shift buttons.

An upgraded Premium braking system was standard on all models, and both the TS50 and TL50 benefitted from Koni suspension components.

Performance

TE50

- 0–100 km/h (0–62 mph) in 7.3 seconds
- 0-400m (1/4 mile) in 15.2 seconds

TS50

- 0–100 km/h (0–62 mph) in 7.1 seconds
- 0-400m (1/4 mile) in 15.2 seconds

Build Numbers

- TE50: 104
- TS50: 54
- TL50: 43

=== T-Series, AUII (T2) ===
This second series was sold in parallel with the AU II series Falcon of 2000–2001, which benefited from structural and interior upgrades. The TE50, for example, could now be had with the previous car's suede-velour interior or a new leather trim with either red or blue inserts and embroidered logos, matched to the Momo steering wheel, gear knob and door trim. In addition, bumper inserts and rear wing were a delete option. For the first time, these models could also be optioned with satellite navigation.

Body

The look of the T2 was revised side skirts bearing each model's insignia, and accent grey inserts on front and rear bumpers. The TE50 now featured the Falcon XR's rear wing as standard, while the TS50 still carried a low-profile model as standard. Wheels sizes did not differ although any model could now be optioned with the new Azzurro 18-inch wheels. The following new colours were introduced: Venom Red, Narooma Blue (which replaced Galaxy Blue midway through the series) while Liquid Silver and Sparkling Burgundy were dropped.

Mechanicals

All these T-Series models now featured the 220 kW (300 hp) engine previously reserved for the TS50. In addition, the latter could now be had with a 5-speed manual transmission. The TE50 was downgraded to Falcon XR8 brakes, with the Premium package becoming optional.

Performance

TE50

- 0–100 km/h (0–62 mph) in 6.7 seconds
- 0-400m (1/4 mile) in 14.7 in seconds

Build Numbers

- TE50: 141
- TS50: 46
- TL50: 12

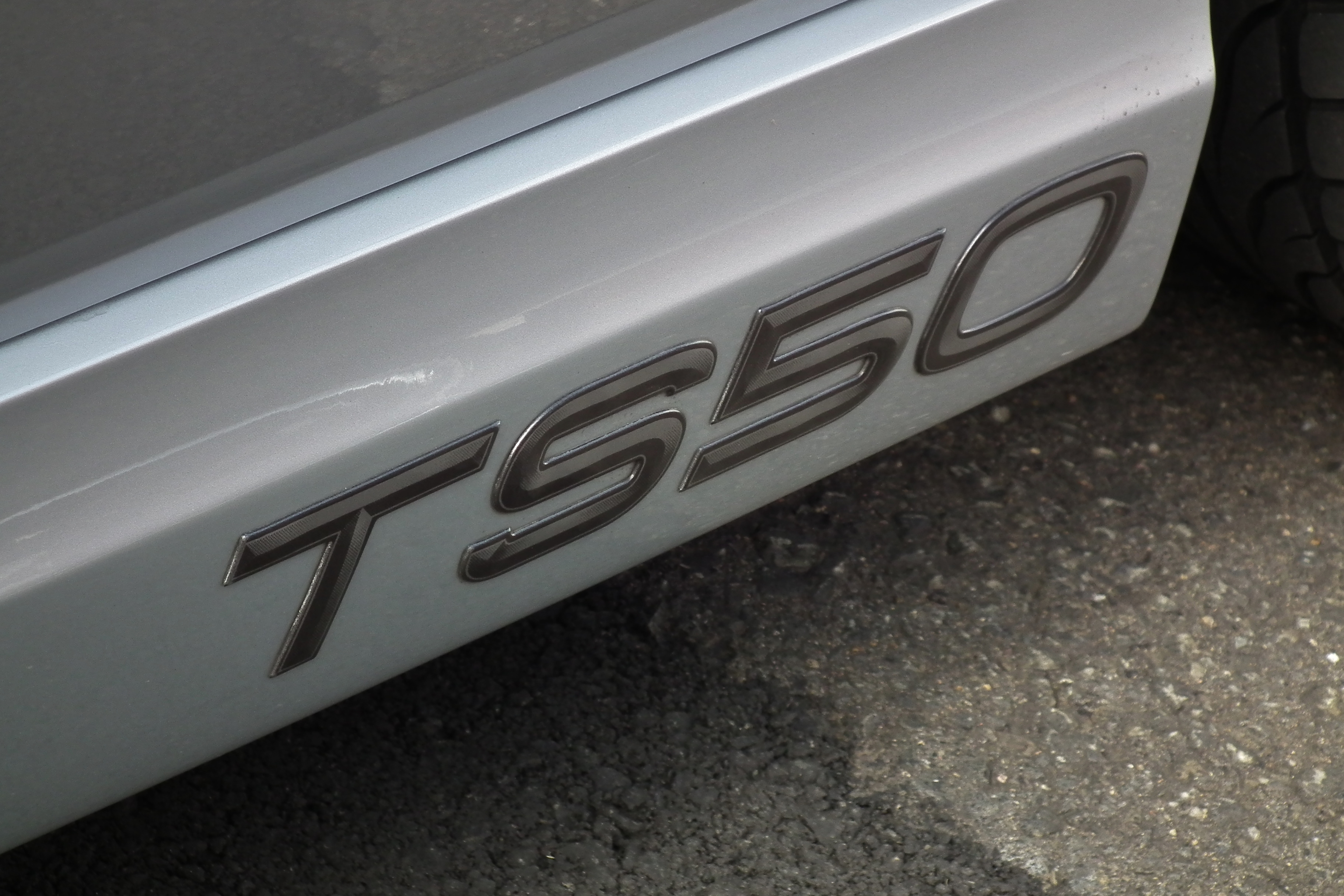
T3 TS50 side skirt badge

=== T-Series, AUIII (T3) ===
This third and final T series was sold in parallel with the AU III series Falcon of 2001–2002. At this time, with the "Windsor" being replaced by Ford's "Romeo" modular V8 architecture worldwide, FTE received the last allotment of these engine blocks allowing FTE to produce 248 units of the Falcon XR8 Pursuit 250 Ute, which was sold as a Ford. The TE50 and TS50 also suffered some interior downgrades: the former lost its Fairmont dashboard for that of a Falcon XR8; and the TS50 lost the same luxury seats it shared with the TL50.

Body

The T3 abandoned the original sophisticated look, to deliver a more powerful look. In fact, all models were now equipped with 18-inch wheels and an all new V8 Racing-inspired bodykit, which consisted of a deeper chin spoiler, tall boot mounted wing and chunkier side and rear fascia extensions. For the first time, the TE50 was fitted with foglights. The rear wing was claimed to offer more rear end grip above 100 km/h. With this bodykit, FTE departed from Ford's internal guidelines regarding defined manufacturing parameters such as departure angles. The result was the most visually aggressive Falcon vehicles since the GT 30th Anniversary of 1997. Blueprint, Congo Green and Monsoon Blue were three new colours offered across the range.

The TE50 now featured the Azzurro alloy wheels as standard, and it could also be optioned with the Koni suspension components fitted to the TS50 and TL50. The TL50 continued with little success, given the slow death of the donor Fairlane by that time.

Mechanicals

All T3 models were now fitted with a 5.6-Litre "stroker" version of the "Windsor" block. An all-new crankshaft, ported cylinder head and a three-piece high flow inlet manifold and conical air cleaner, resulted in engine outputs rising to 250 kW (335 hp) and 500 N⋅m (369 lb⋅ft). As a result, these models were known for being the fastest, most powerful naturally-aspirated Falcons, until the release of the Boss 290 powered GT Falcons.

Because of the short development period of 10 months, all T series models no longer featured traction control, which was previously available only on the automatics. They could nevertheless now be optioned with a Brembo braking system, which was superior to the FTE "Premium" package.

Performance

TE50

- 0–100 km/h (0–62 mph) in 5.86 seconds
- 0-400m (1/4 mile) in 14.18 seconds

Build Numbers

- TE50: 204
- TS50: 224
- TL50: 3
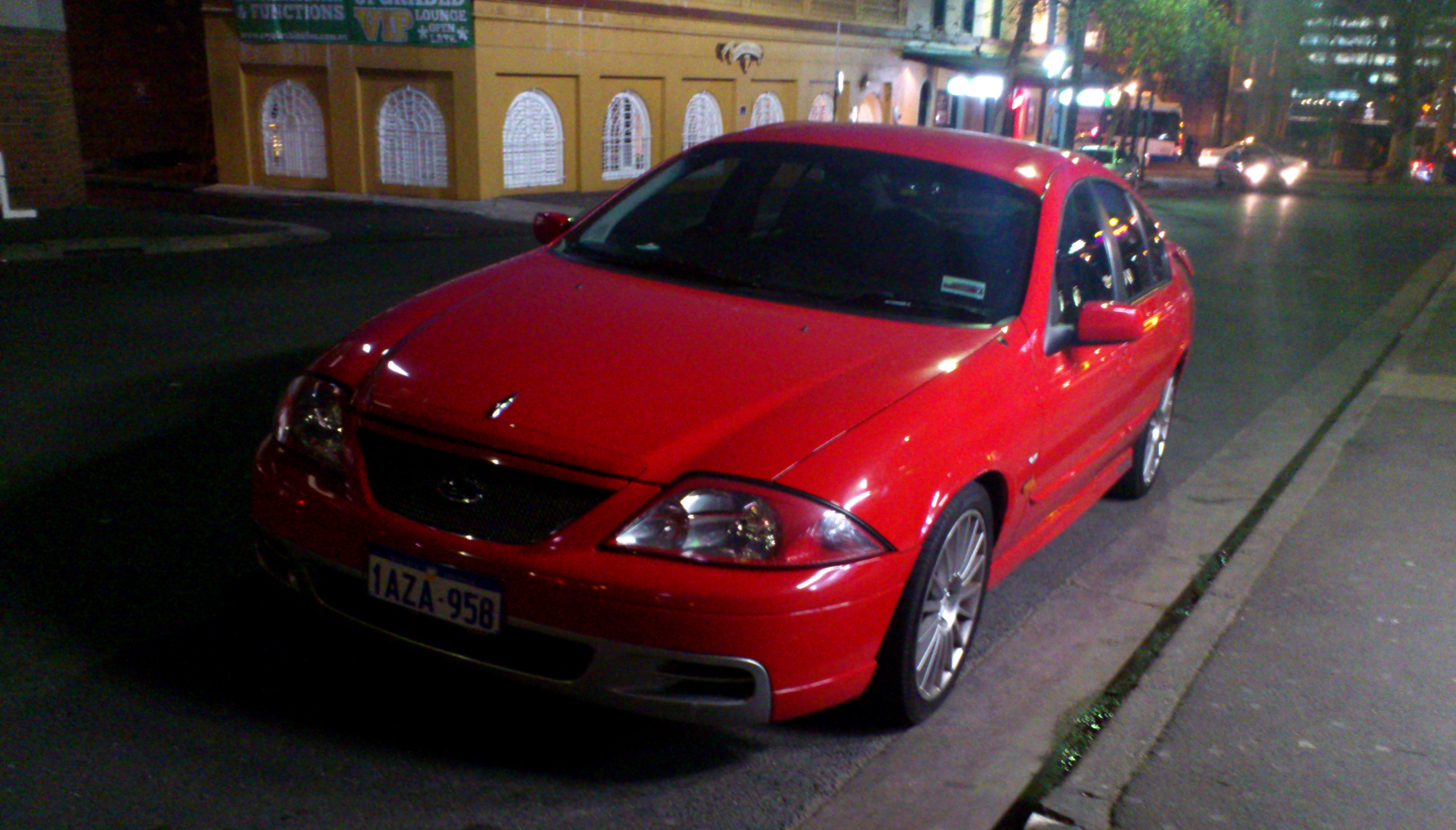
T2 TE50

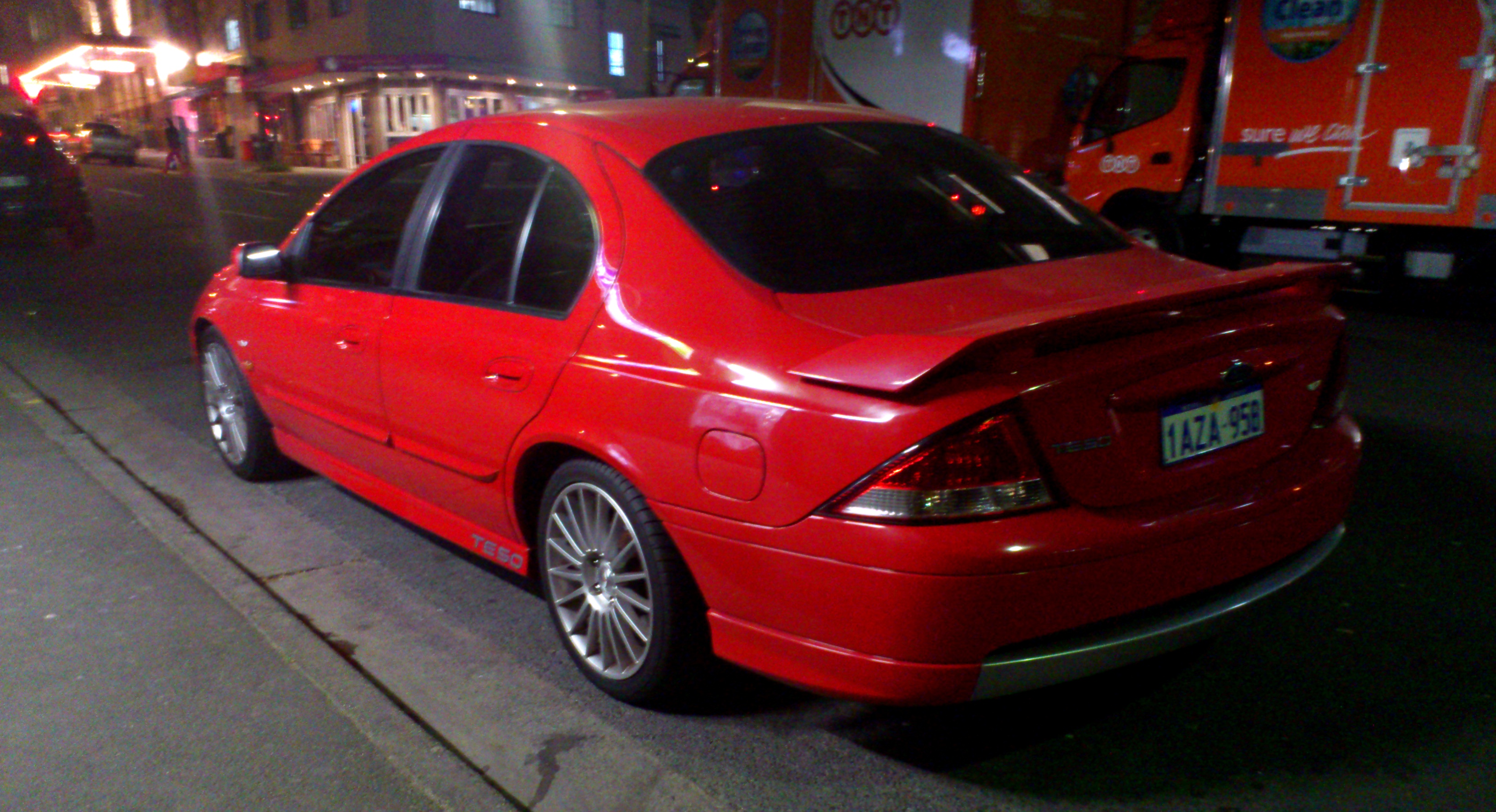
T2 TE50

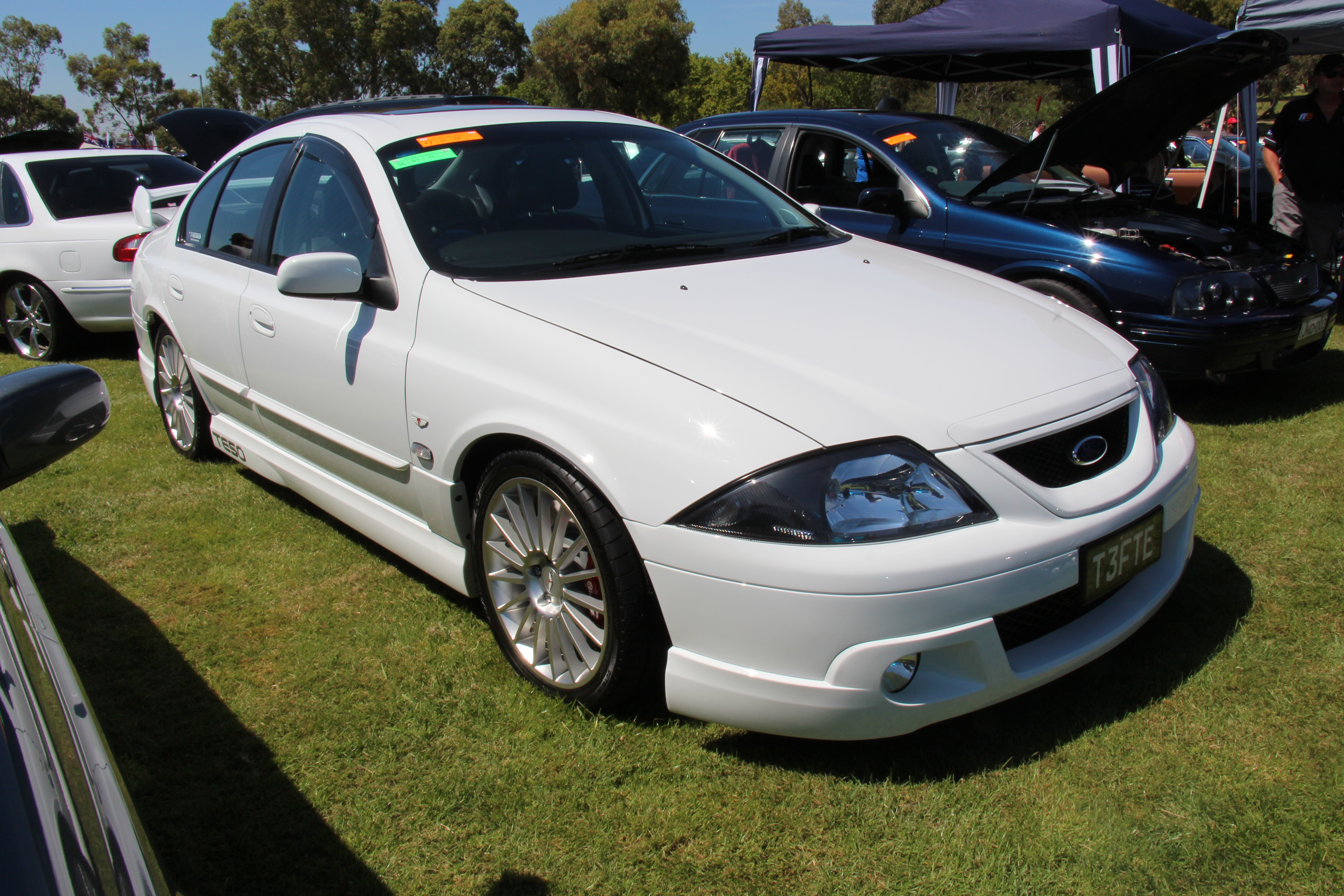
T3 TE50

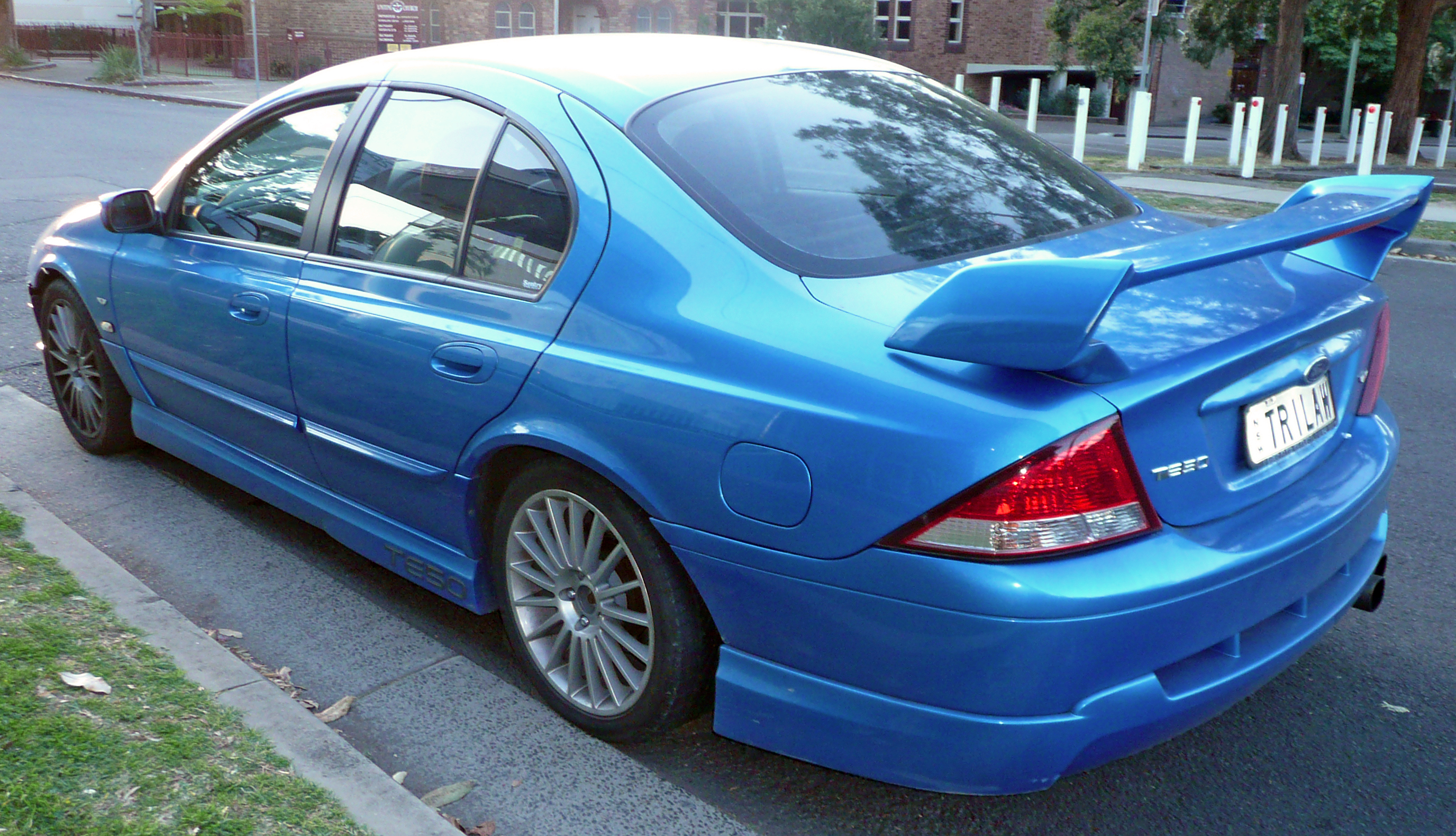
T3 TE50 (with Azzurro alloy wheels)

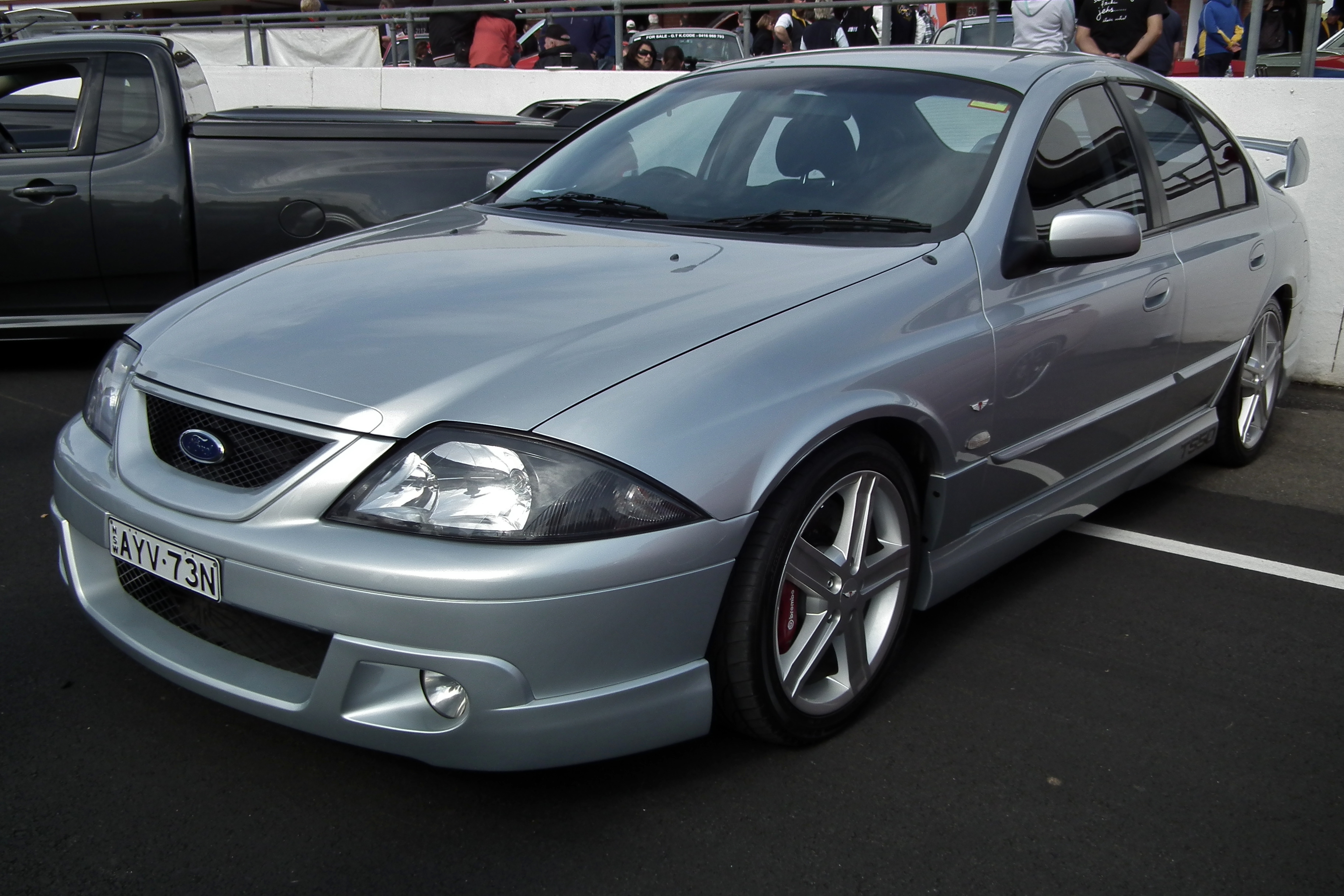
T3 TS50

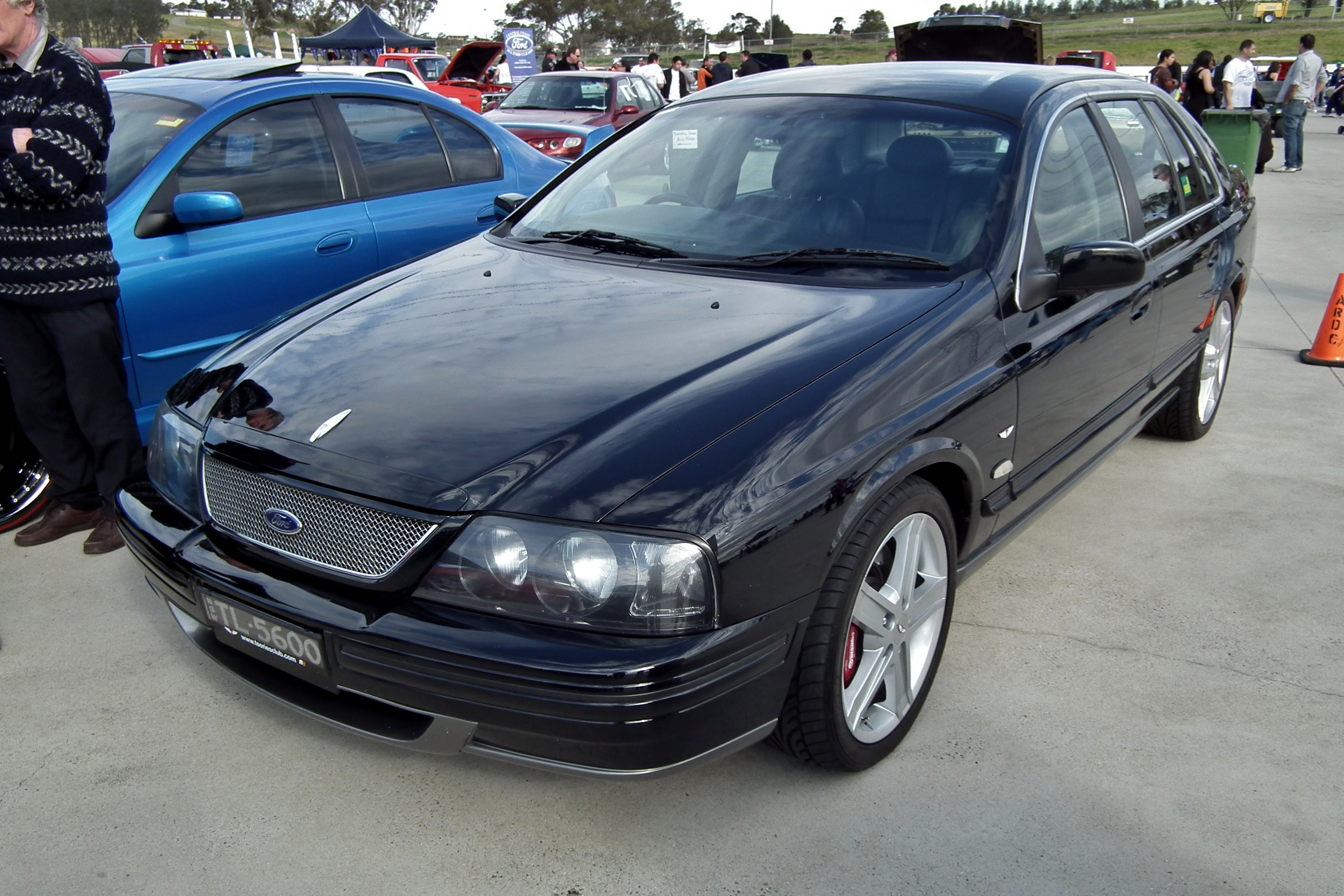
T3 TL50

== Special vehicles ==
=== Capri Clubsprint ===
In 1992, one of the first projects assigned to TVE was to improve the Australian built "SA30" Ford Capri. The resulting Capri Clubsprint was based on the Turbo XR2 version but with added suspension upgrades to improve handling, and a bespoke bodykit (making the car strictly a 2-seater) with larger 16-inch alloy wheels. In total, TVE built 200 units.

=== Fairlane by Tickford ===
In 1998, TVE made a number of improvements to the NL series Fairlane Ghia marketed the resulting car as the Fairlane By Tickford. Using the upgrades from the EL series Falcon GT "30th Anniversary" of 1997 and Ford Motorsport parts, the engine received different heads and an intake manifold resulting in a power output of 195 kW (261 hp), up from standard Fairlane's 165 kW (221 hp). The FBT also benefitted from the said GT's bigger brake package and an sportier interior. A total of 106 were produced, only available in Navy Blue or Regency Red. 1998 NL Fairlane by Tickford

This long wheelbase forerunner to the TL50 was a very special limited edition apart from its tiny 106 production run. This model was the first local ford to carry the new Tickford T-Series badges. It was effectively a long wheelbase version of the EL GT but there were key mechanical differences as it became the first local Ford to offer the US Explorer's revised Windsor V8 with the GT40P heads. It is sometimes known as the Fairlane 195.

The special engine in this model featured the GT40P heads, the revised Explorer upper and lower inlet manifolds, 65 mm throttle body, 70 mm airflow meter, Motorsport injectors and special extractors. Torque was lifted to 410 Nm, a welcome boost for a model that was as spacious and luxuriously equipped as this one.

The exterior was dominated by a more purposeful mesh grille and the large flat-spoked 17 inch alloy wheels. Combined with its lower ride height, there was no mistaking it for an everyday Fairlane on VIP duty.

The GT theme extended to the interior which included sports-contoured front seats, leather and wood-rimmed Momo 4 spoke steering wheel and leather trim accents on doors, dash and centre console. Walnut inserts matching the Momo wheel were added to the door tops and T-bar surround while door handles were polished chrome. A premium 250 Watt 9 speaker audio system and alarm were also standard. This premium model came only in Navy Blue or Regency Red.

Engine: Fairlane 195 kW: Windsor 5-litre V8, OHV, electronic multi-point fuel injection, 9.00:1 compression, GT-40P Explorer heads, roller rockers, special camshaft, upgraded 65mm throttle body and engine management system, electronic ignition, low restriction extractor exhaust system, 195 kW at 4700 rpm, 410Nm at 3900 rpm (net)

Transmission: BTR M97LE, electronic 4 speed auto, GT Adaptive Shift Strategy, T-Bar shift. Ratios: 1st 2.39:1 - 2nd 1.45:1 - 3rd 1.00:1 - 4th - 0.68:1, Reverse 2.09:1 Rear axle: 3.45:1, LSD Suspension: Front: Independent, upper and lower wishbones with urethane inner bushes, unique coil spring/strut-type dampers, GT camber and castor kit and 28 mm anti-roll bar. Modified spindle to accommodate bigger brakes. Rear: Live axle, upper and lower longitudinal arms, transverse Watts linkage, unique variable-rate coil springs and dampers, 24 mm anti-roll bar, tuned urethane upper and lower trailing arm bushes, delete self-levelling. Brakes: Front ventilated 329mm discs, PBR twin piston Cobra calipers, rear solid 299 mm discs. ABS Wheels: 17" x 7.5" Speedline 6-spoke alloy Tyres: 225/45R17 Michelin Pilot SXGT

=== Cougar Eibach ===
In 1999, the Ford Cougar was imported to Australia to capitalise on the sports coupe market, since the departure of the Ford Probe. Sales, however, were low due to shrinking demand and lack of public awareness of the Cougar name. In August 2000, FTE released 100 units of the Cougar Eibach, which featured sportier suspension and a bodykit based on a US market item, but further modified by Tickford for the Australian market. This FTE model was discontinued in April 2001. The Cougar range was discontinued in March 2004.

=== Mustang SVT Cobra ===
In 2001, to combat the release of the third-generation Holden Monaro, TVE set out on a massive project to re-engineer the fourth-generation Mustang SVT Cobra for Australia. This involved substantial revisions to the body, electronics and drivetrain. More than 250 changes were made by the time a RHD conversion was finished. The process started on the assembly line in the US, where a windscreen that conformed to the Australia Design Rules (ADR) was fitted in addition to revised wiring for the seat electronics. Other parts – such as for the lights and exhaust – were swapped in favour of Japanese specification items given they required lesser revisions to meet the ADR. In total, 250 units were sold between 2001 and 2002.

One of the biggest challenges presented by this project was the floor pan, since in left hand drive, the driver had the most space available. The engine and gearbox offset had to be reversed with the use of Tickford engineered brackets, and unique floor pan sections, to achieve the necessary space for the driver in RHD. In addition, an all new dashboard and interior trimmings had to be installed. In effect, TVE re-manufactured the Mustang at a cost of A$4 million remaining the biggest ever project for Tickford in Australia.

Sales did not meet expectations, including due to a very high A$85,000 retail price.

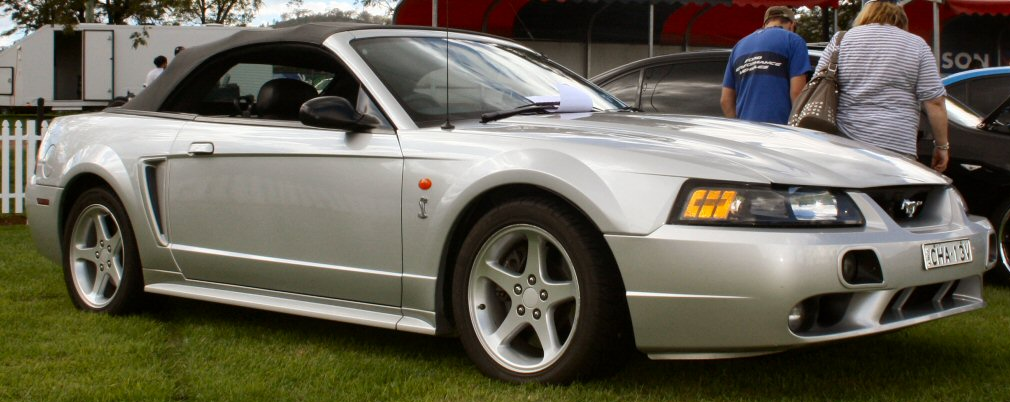
FTE Mustang Cobra

== Concept cars ==
TVE also developed a range of concept cars for a variety of automotive shows around Australia. These cars were developed not only to grab attention in favour of Ford products but also to display various technological features.

- Falcon XR8 Sequential sedan (EL-series): powered by a modified 5.0-Litre V8 engine producing over 200 kW (270 hp), its key feature was a Harrop-engineered and built sequential shift transmission; it also received a re-trimmed leather interior, upgraded brakes and suspension, 19-inch alloy wheels, twin bonnet air scoops and Mexican Fire paint that changed from gold to red depending on light conditions.
- Falcon Predator sedan (EL-series): based on a Falcon Futura sedan, it was powered by a supercharged LPG version of its 6-cylinder engine boosting output to 230 kW (308 hp); it also received a re-trimmed Momo-leather interior with upgraded sound system, upgraded brakes, 18-inch wheels and it was painted in Orange Copper.
- Mustang V10 convertible (4th generation): created in conjunction with Herrod Automotive in 2001 as a Ford Racing Australia exhibition car for use during V8 Supercar and other motorsport events around Australia, it had its standard 4.6-litre V8 replaced by a Ford Modular 6.8-Litre V10 engine from the American F truck series but fitted with a Sprintex supercharger.

== Motorsport ==
In 1999, Glenn Seton's V8 Supercar racing outfit was bought out by Ford and rebranded Ford Tickford Racing. It expanded to a 2 race car operation, with Neil Crompton the second driver. This marked the first time since 1973 that Ford officially backed a team into the Australian touring car championship. Eventually, Ford diverted attention to Gibson Motorsport, leaving Glenn Seton to run without factory backing, until his team was acquired by Prodrive at the end of 2002, to become Ford Performance Racing.

== See also ==
- Ford Performance Vehicles
- Tickford
- Special Vehicle Operations
