= Fault Tolerant Ethernet =

Networking technology

- Communication protocol
- Purpose: network protocol
- Developer: Honeywell
- Introduction: 2011; 15 years ago

Fault Tolerant Ethernet (FTE) is proprietary protocol created by Honeywell mainly for use its Experion PLS DCS.

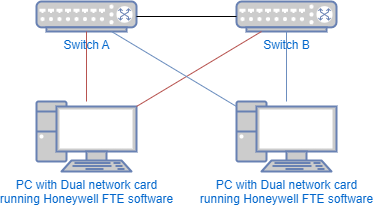

Designed to provide rapid network redundancy, on top of spanning tree protocol. Each node is connected twice to a single LAN through the dual network interface controllers. The driver and the FTE enabled components allow network communication to occur over an alternate path when the primary path fails.

Default time before failure is detected, is Diagnostic Interval (1000ms) multiplier with Disjoin Multiplier (3), for a 3000ms recovery time.

Similar to Switch Fault Tolerance (SFT) in windows and mode=1 (active-backup) in Linux.

== Supported hardware and software ==
- Windows 7/2003 or newer
- Control Firewall (CF9)
- C200/C200E Controller
- C300 Controller (PCNT01/PCNT02/PCNT05)
- CN100
- Series 8 Controller
- Control Network Module (CNM)
- EHPM/C300PM TPN Controllers
- Safety Manager / Safety Manager SC

== Technical overview ==
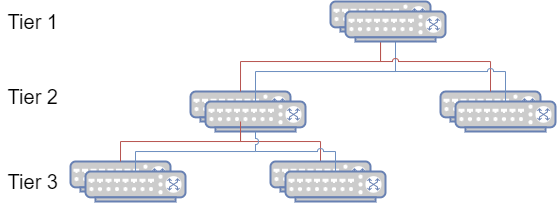

- Uses Multicast ( 234.5.6.7), for FTE community.
- Recommended maximum of 300 FTE nodes and 200 single connected Ethernet nodes (A machine with to network cards is considered as two separate single connected Ethernet nodes).
- Recommended to have separate broadcast/multicast domain, for different FTE communities.
- Recommended maximum of 3 tiers of switches.
- Default UDP Source Port: 47837
- Default UDP Destination Port : 51966
