= Format-transforming encryption =

In cryptography, format-transforming encryption (FTE) refers to encryption where the format of the input plaintext and output ciphertext are configurable. Descriptions of formats can vary, but are typically compact set descriptors, such as a regular expression.

Format-transforming encryption is closely related to, and a generalization of, format-preserving encryption.

== Applications of FTE ==
=== Restricted fields or formats ===
Similar to format-preserving encryption, FTE can be used to control the format of ciphertexts. The canonical example is a credit card number, such as 1234567812345670 (16 bytes long, digits only). However, FTE does not enforce that the input format must be the same as the output format.

=== Censorship circumvention ===
FTE is used by the Tor Project to circumvent deep packet inspection by pretending to be other protocols. The implementation is fteproxy; it was written by the authors who came up with the FTE concept.
