= Foundation For Technical Education =

- Founded: 2003
- Type: Education Foundation
- Location: Geneva, Switzerland

The Foundation for Technical Education (FTE) is a philanthropic organization based in Geneva, Switzerland.

== Overview ==
Francis Brochon, a French electronics engineer and entrepreneur, founded FTE in 2003.

FTE works with developing countries that are in need of technical training.

== The FTE Education Model ==
FTE has developed a 5-step education model emphasizing the development of employable skills needed for a successful career as a technician.

The five principles of the FTE Education Model are:

1. Learning-by-doing: Student-centred training using modern learning technologies
2. Best of both: Local teachers with international skills training
3. Filling a need: Alignment with labour market demands
4. Doers, not nerds: Business management and entrepreneurship skills training
5. Meritocracy wins: Merit-based scholarships for young men and women

== Projects ==
=== KIITEC ===
The Kilimanjaro International Institute for Telecommunications, Electronics and Computers (KIITEC) is the successful pilot education project introduced by FTE in 2004 that encompasses all five principles of the FTE Education Model.

Based in Arusha, Tanzania, KIITEC is a leading technical education centre supplying skilled and competent technicians to meet the needs of local industries. KIITEC is registered and accredited by the National Council for Technical Education. Successful graduates are awarded a 3-year National Technical Award Level Six (NTA-6) Diploma.

Today, FTE works in collaboration with its partner ADEI who oversees and executes the on the ground actions of KIITEC through volunteering initiatives.

=== Scaling Up ===
Negotiations are underway in Kenya, Zambia, Rwanda, Burundi and Uganda to work with existing technical education institutions.

The FTE Education Model relies on shared responsibilities based on international expertise but local ownership, entrusting the coordination and management to the local leadership team of the schools.

== International Partners and Sponsors ==
To date, partnerships have been fostered with:

- Aide Développement Education International (ADEI)
- Ingénieurs du Monde
- Powertechnics Ltd
- Schneider Electric Foundation
- Schneider Electric Teachers
