= Foundation of Technical Education =

The Foundation of Technical Education (FTE) is an Iraqi administrative organization belonging to the Ministry of Higher Education and Scientific Research. It is responsible for the Iraqi Technical Colleges and Institutes.
