= Utrechtse sneltram =

Rapid transit railway in Utrecht, Netherlands

Coordinates: 52.0092°N 5.0383°E

Utrechtse sneltram (U-OV)

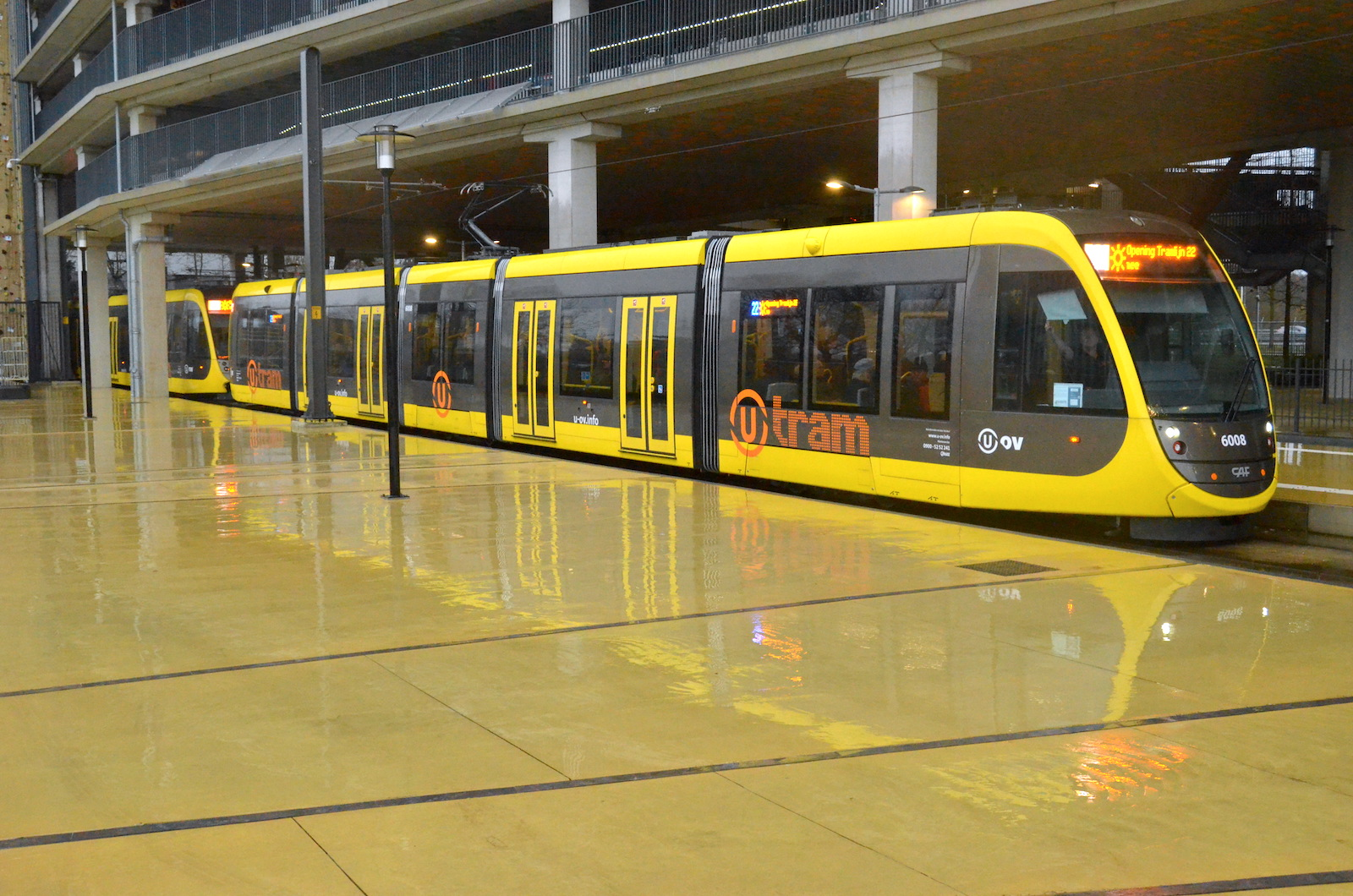
- CAF trams at P+R Science Park

Operation
- Locale: Utrecht, Netherlands
- Open: 17 December 1983; 42 years ago
- Lines: 3
- Operators: Westnederland (1983–1994); Midnet (1994–1999); Connexxion (1999–2013); Qbuzz (2013–2025); Transdev (2025–present)

Infrastructure
- Track gauge: 1,435 mm (4 ft 8 1/2 in) standard gauge
- Electrification: 750 V DC from overhead catenary

Statistics
Overview
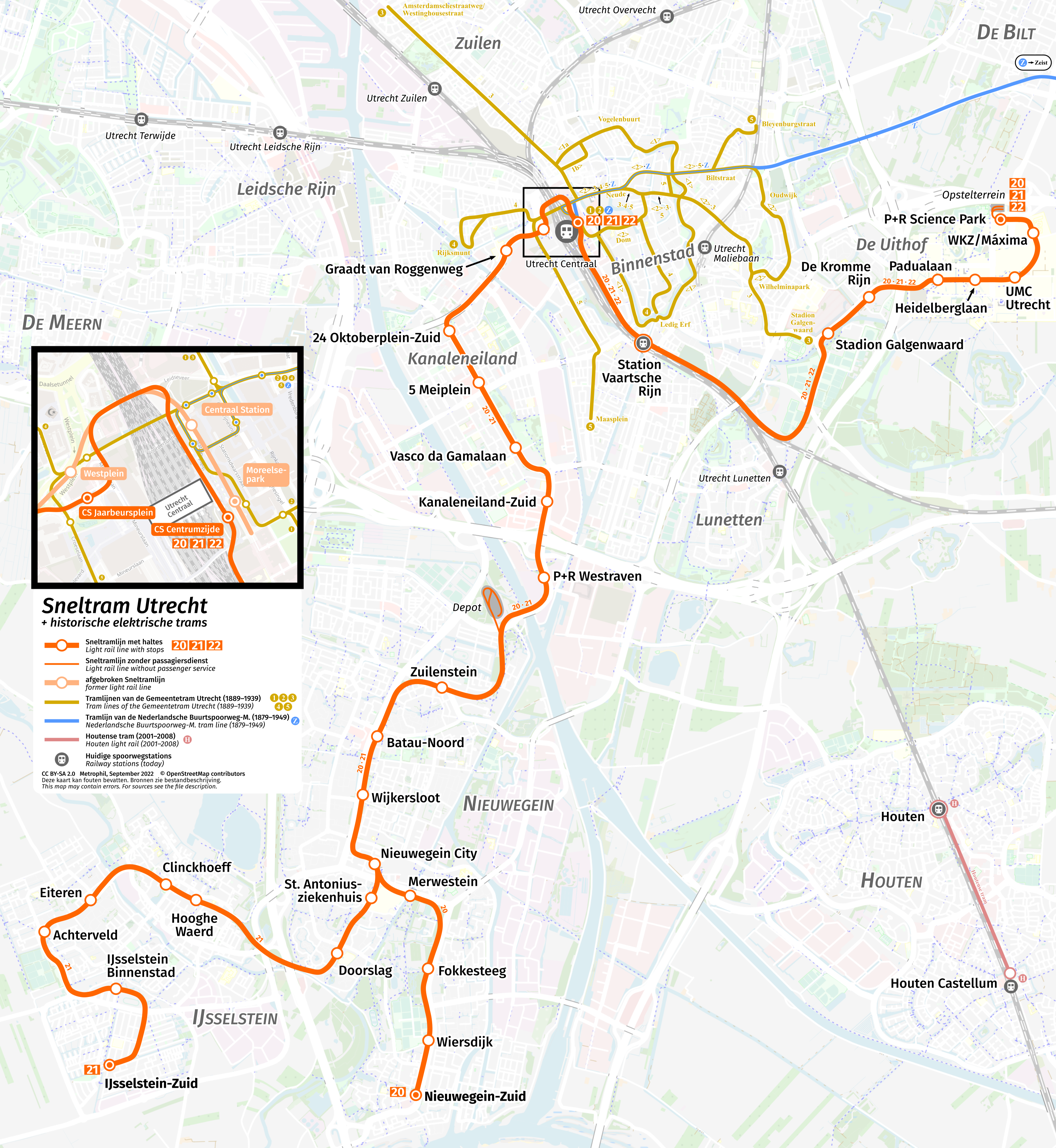

The Utrechtse sneltram (Dutch pronunciation: [ˈytrɛxtsə ˈsnɛltrɛm]; literally Utrecht fast tram), operating under the brand name U-OV, where "OV" is the Dutch abbreviation for openbaar vervoer (public transport), is a light rail system in the Dutch city of Utrecht. The system consists of three tram routes connecting Utrecht Centraal railway station with the residential areas of Lombok and Kanaleneiland and the suburbs Nieuwegein and IJsselstein to the southwest of the station, and with the Uithof district and Utrecht University to the southeast. The system has a total length of 18.3 km, and a rolling stock consisting of 54 trams. It carried over 9 million riders in 2023.

== Organisation ==
There are four entities associated with the sneltram.

Bestuur Regio Utrecht is the regional public transport authority in the Utrecht region. BRU does long- and short-term planning for public transport in the region working closely with municipalities and travellers' organisations.

Transdev Nederland Mobility Services N.V. has a concession to operate bus and tram vehicles in the Utrecht region under the brand name U-OV on behalf of its client Bestuur Regio Utrecht. The concession to Transdev began on 14 December 2025, and will last until 2035.

The province of Utrecht is the owner of the sneltram, and manages its assets through a provincial entity called Regiotram Utrecht.

Regiotram Utrecht is responsible for the management, maintenance and expansion of the entire tram system in and around the city of Utrecht. Regiotram Utrecht has approximately three dozen employees located at the Nieuwegein depot. The entity manages and maintains tram infrastructure such as trams, track, signaling, level crossings, stops and digital information panels for riders. It also deals with safety on the tram system.

== Lines ==
The Utrechtse sneltram travels via Utrecht Centraal station (abbreviated as Utrecht CS) between the Uithof district southeast of the station to Nieuwegein and IJsselstein southwest of the station.

The section of the sneltram running southwest of Utrecht CS is dubbed the SUNIJ line (SUNIJ-lijn – sneltram Utrecht-Nieuwegein/IJsselstein – lijn meaning "line") after the communities served. From Utrecht CS, the SUNIJ line runs to Stadscentrum in Nieuwegein where the line branches to separate termini, tram 20 to Nieuwegein-Zuid and tram 21 to IJsselstein-Zuid. The section running southeast of Utrecht CS is dubbed the Uithof line (Uithoflijn), and runs to P+R Science Park in the Uithof district. Tram routes 20, 21 and 22 all use the Uithof line.

At Utrecht CS, there are two tram stops: Jaarbeursplein on the west side of the station, and Centrumzijde ("downtown side") on its east side. Until 2 July 2022, no trams carried passengers between these two stops, and passengers had a 500-metre walk to transfer between the SUNIJ and Uithof lines at Utrecht CS. Today, on weekdays, it is possible to ride from Nieuwegein-Zuid and IJsselstein-Zuid to P+R Science Park without changing trams.

There are three tram routes:

- Tram 20: Nieuwegein-Zuid – Utrecht CS – P+R Science Park
- Tram 21: IJsselstein-Zuid – Utrecht CS – P+R Science Park
- Tram 22: Utrecht CS – P+R Science Park

On weekends and after 21:30 on weekdays, there is no service on the Uithof line; at which times, tram routes 20 and 21 would terminate at Utrecht CS Centrumzijde instead of P+R Science Park, and tram 22 would not run. Tram 22 started operation on 22 August 2022.

The sneltram operates largely off-street except for level crossings. Between the P+R Science Park and Padualaan stops in the Uithof as well as between the Centrumzijde and Jaarbeursplein stops at Utrecht Centraal, trams operate in a paved right-of-way shared with buses. Trams operate in dedicated centre-of-road reservation between Jaarbeursplein and the Vasco da Gamalaan stops. Around the Kanaleneiland-Zuid stop, trams operate between two parallel streets in a dedicated right-of-way.

== History ==
=== Earlier tram services ===
In Utrecht, there were earlier tram services that existed between 1879 and 1949, after which there was no tram service until the sneltram opened in 1983.

Tram service in Utrecht began in 1879 with a horse-drawn tram line running between Utrecht, De Bilt and Zeist. Between 1883 and 1929, steam and horse trams ran between Utrecht and the villages of Jutphaas and Vreeswijk, now part of Nieuwegein. The first electric trams ran in Utrecht in 1906, and later in 1909 from Utrecht to De Bilt and Zeist. In 1921 there were five tram lines. Tram lines connected the city center with suburbs such as Rivierenwijk, Wilhelminapark and Elinkwijk. With the increase in auto traffic and bus services, city tram service ended in 1938. After being interrupted during the Second World War, tram service to Zeist ended in May 1949.

=== Sneltram timeline ===
The sneltram light rail system was constructed during the late 1970s and early 1980s. There were two branches both opened on 17 December 1983. One branch ran between Moreelsepark (Utrecht city centre) to Nieuwegein-Zuid in the suburb of Nieuwegein as line 100. A second branch ran from Moreelsepark to Doorslag in Nieuwegein as line 101. The operator was Westnederland.

On 14 December 1985, line 101 was extended to the Achterveld stop in IJsselstein.

In 1994, Midnet took over operation of the sneltram from Westnederland, and lines 100 and 101 were renumbered as 60 and 61 respectively.

In 1999, Connexxion took over operation of the sneltram from Midnet.

On 2 July 2000, line 61 was extended from Achterveld via Binnenstad (both in IJsselstein) to IJsselstein-Zuid.

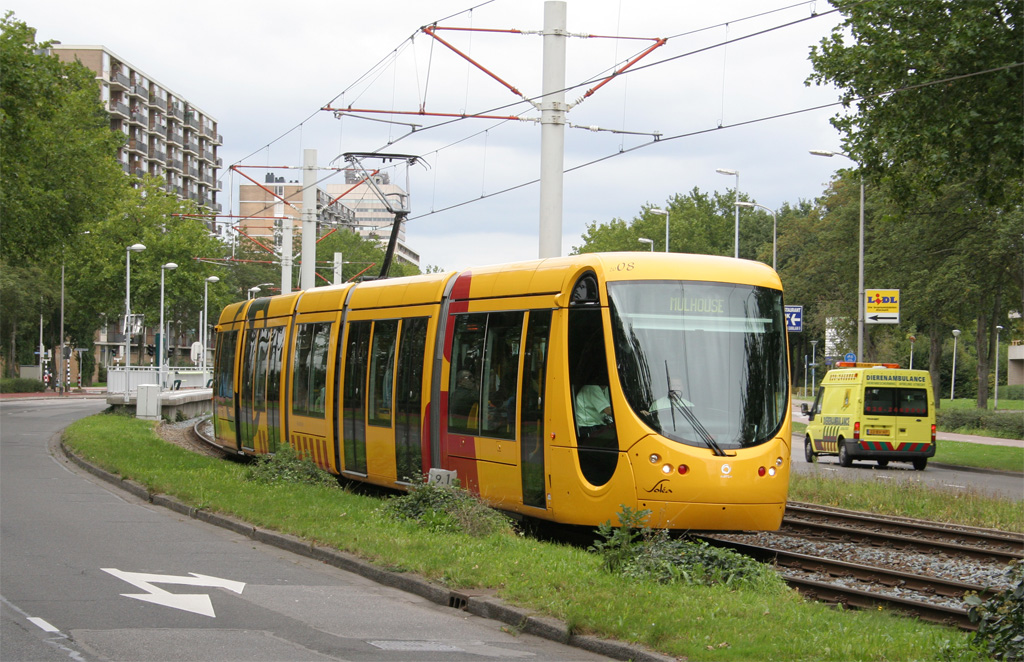
Citadis tram from Mulhouse on a demo run on the SUNIJ-lijn on 9 September 2007

In September 2007, Alstom Transport arranged the loan to Utrecht of a low-floor Citadis tram from Mulhouse. The tram made demo runs between 7 and 13 September. On 9 September, a car-free Sunday in Utrecht, the Mulhouse tram was put on public display. At the time, Utrecht was considering a replacement of its then 30-year-old tram fleet and the replacement of bus lanes with trams.

In 2009, the Moreelsepark stop was closed to accommodate the construction of a new public transit terminal. Until this time, Moreelsepark was the downtown terminal for the sneltram. With its closure, the stop Centraal Station became the new terminal.

On 13 December 2009, the spitstram (rush-hour tram) went into service as line 260 using trams purchased second hand from Vienna. It ran between Utrecht and Nieuwegein Zuid during the morning and afternoon peak periods.

In December 2011, Qbuzz took over operation of the sneltram from Connexxion.

In 2013, the stops Centraal Station and Westplein closed due to construction at Utrecht Centraal station. The stop Jaarbeursplein became the new temporary terminal.

On 11 July 2014, the Vienna trams were retired from service and sold to Kraków in Poland, thus ending line 260 spitstram service.

In 2015, the Province of Utrecht became the owner of the Utrechtse sneltram.

In December 2016, the first low-floor CAF-tram arrived in Utrecht at the tram depot.

On 18 March 2019, there was a shooting attack on a tram near the junction of 24 Oktoberplein.

On 28 November 2019, a new workshop building was officially opened at the depot (Tramremise Nieuwegein). It handles maintenance for low-floor trams as well as for the older high-floor trams.

On 14 December 2019, line 22 (dubbed Uithoflijn) opened from Utrecht Centraal to the Uithof district. It replaced bus line 12, in service since 1969, which used articulated buses that were 18 and 25 metres long, the latter length having two articulations. Upon opening of the line, the frequency was 10 trams per hour per direction. Service was weekdays only with no service after 22:00; this was the same hours of service as for bus line 12. Bus 28 serves the route when line 22 is not running. There was still a 500-metre walk at Utrecht Centraal for any passengers wanting to transfer between the SUNIJ and Uithof lines. At this time the Utrechtse sneltram had three lines:

Line	60	61	22
Length of line	13.3 km (8.3 mi)	17.7 km (11.0 mi)	7.5 km (4.7 mi)
Number of stops	15	19	9

Effective 2 March 2020, the frequency of line 22 was increased from 10 to 12 trams per hour per direction. By the beginning of February, the top day for ridership was 18,000. Regiotrams hoped to increase the frequency to 16 trams per hour per direction in December 2020.

Effective 20 March 2020, all tram service on line 22 was temporarily replaced by bus line 28 due to the COVID-19 pandemic. With the closure of the University of Utrecht and other institutions in Utrecht Science Park, line 22 ridership had fallen by over 90 percent. Also fewer tram drivers were available because many drivers were calling in sick. Trams on lines 60 and 61 continued to run but less frequently. On 1 April 2020, tram service was reintroduced on line 22 but only during rush hours. Also, double-articulated buses were put into service on bus line 28. These measures were to allow greater physical distancing among passengers which include health workers employed at Utrecht Science Park.

On 30 May 2020, the SUNIJ line south of P+R Westhaven was shut down in order to lower and extend station platforms to accommodate coupled pairs of low-floor CAF trams. High-floor trams continued to operate between P+R Westhaven and Jaarbeursplein until 4 July when that portion of the line also shut down. The last day of service for SIG trams was on 3 July, when the high-floor trams had their last runs after 37 years of service. From 4 July, the SUNIJ line was fully shut down for renovation.

On 3 January 2021, line 60 from Utrecht Centraal to Nieuwegein Zuid reopened using 7-section CAF trams. (Effective that same date, the tram stop "5 Meiplein" was renamed to "Winkelcentrum Kanaleneiland", with "winkelcentrum" meaning "shopping centre".) On 14 March 2021, line 61 went fully into service between Jaarbeursplein and IJsselstein-Zuid.

Images from Google Streetview
- Tram crossing at Laan van Maarschalkerweerd showing road signals

On 16 March 2021, a coupled pair of trams travelling north towards Stadion Galgenwaard station was struck and derailed by a van at a level crossing along the road Laan van Maarschalkerweerd. No serious injuries were reported, but both the road and tracks required an extended closure, and heavy damage was reported to the overhead wires in addition to damage to the derailed trams, one of which was sprawled across the road. Police allege that the van driver was under the influence and had run through a red light. Between March and September 2021, there have been three incidents of road users ignoring a red light at a tram crossing, which were not protected by crossing gates. In each case, the road vehicle struck the side of the tram between the operator cabin and the first wheel set, lifting the tram off the track during the collision. The three collisions damaged five trams in all, of which one from the incident at Laan van Maarschalkerweerd may be beyond repair. The province of Utrecht hopes to recover 5 million euros for the damage to trams and infrastructure from the motorists' insurance companies, since their clients were all at fault. The province has asked U-OV to lower the speed of trams at crossings from 40 km/h to 20 km/h. The province plans to spend 750,000 euros to improve safety at tram crossings, and to order five additional trams to create a reserve in its fleet.

Between 26 June 2021 and 6 September 2021, line 22 was replaced by buses in order to repave the combined tram/bus lanes near Science Park station. The pavement surface was crumbling posing hazards to vehicles. A new paving technique was used that re-attached the paving to the tram track using a special liquid substance.

Between 26 February and 8 July 2022, buses replaced trams to Nieuwegein and IJsselstein in order to relocate the Stadscentrum tram stop and realign the tracks. Upon reopening, the stop was renamed from Stadscentrum to Nieuwegein City.

Between March and April 2022, the level crossing at Symfonielaan near the Zuilenstein tram stop was closed in order to widen the bicycle paths crossing the tracks and to add crossing gates for extra protection. The crossing has the bicycle paths on both sides of the road; previously, the crossing was protected only by traffic lights. A fatal collision in 2020 between a tram and a scooter at the crossing was the reason for this improvement.

Starting 2 July 2022, passengers could ride trams between the Jaarbeursplein and Centrumzijde stops at Utrecht Centraal station thus eliminating a 500-metre walk for passengers transferring between the SUNIJ and Uithof lines. SUNIJ lines 60 and 61 became tram routes 20 and 21 respectively which continued onto P+R Science Park on weekdays.

By mid-November 2022, wheel-sound dampers had been installed on all trams to reduce squealing on curves. Twenty greasing installations were installed in IJsselstein, in Nieuwegein and at several places in the city of Utrecht. From 2023, the rails would also be ground so that tram wheels would optimally contact the rails. These efforts are to reduce noise and noise complaints.

In June 2024, the province of Utrecht announced that the concession to run trams and buses within the city of Utrecht and its immediate suburbs would be awarded to Transdev Nederland Mobility Services N.V., replacing Qbuzz beginning in December 2025. The Transdev concession would expire in 2035. Transdev would continue to operate under the U-OV brand name.

=== SUNIJ renovation (2020–2021) ===
Between 31 May and 4 July 2020, the SUNIJ line was shut down in stages in order to renovate the line. The main work was to lower and lengthen tram platforms to accommodate new low-floor CAF trams. The project also included upgrades to the line's infrastructure (signals and switches) and work to stabilize the tram roadbed. Tram service was replaced by buses.

Passenger service from Utrecht to Nieuwegein Zuid was originally to have resumed on 21 September, and to IJsselstein Zuid on 26 October. However, the Dutch rail safety authority ILT (Inspection Leefomgeving en Transport) blocked the opening declaring that the project was not a renovation but rather new construction, which required different documentation to proceed to opening. There was an extra delay in opening line 61 due to work to reinforce the tram roadbed near IJsselstein Zuid. The opening dates were then revised to January 2021 for line 60 to Nieuwegein Zuid and February 2021 for line 61 to IJsselstein Zuid.

From 10 November 2020, day time tests resumed running a coupled pair of CAF trams between Utrecht and Nieuwegein. (Previously, tests had been done at night in the summer of 2020.) Technical tests were carried out such items as for traffic signals and turnouts. At each tram stop, the exact position where a 75 m (246 feet), two-tram consist should stop was determined in order to reserve a boarding location for wheelchair users on the platform. During this test phase, trams operated below 40 km/h (25 mph). After ILT granted an operating permit, tram operators were trained and system testing conducted, timed against an operating schedule. Line 60 from Utrecht Centraal to Nieuwegein Zuid reopened on 3 January 2021 using 7-section CAF trams running 8 times per hour from Monday through Saturday. (The frequency would be reduced to 4 times per hour after line 61's reopening.)

Prior to the renovation, the Stadscentrum tram stop was located on the south side of the street Passage at the entrance to the Cityplaza shopping mall. After the line reopened on 3 January 2021, the stop had been temporarily relocated north of Passage between the streets Schouwstede and Hagestede. In future, the stop will be moved once again to its final location south of Passage at the street Weverstede.

On 16 January 2021, overnight testing began on line 61 to IJsselstein-Zuid. On 28 February 2021, line 61 went into operation; however, passengers were allowed to ride line 61 trams only between Jaarbeursplein and Stadscentrum (Nieuwegein) and had to continue further south by bus. Line 61 trams ran between Stadscentrum and IJsselstein-Zuid as test runs operating according to a schedule but without picking up passengers. On 14 March 2021, line 61 fully reopened for passenger service between Jaarbeursplein and IJsselstein-Zuid. To compensate riders for the late reopenings, U-OV offered the public free trips for two weeks on both lines 60 and 61.

On 22 October 2021, construction started to lengthen the platforms at the Jaarbeursplein tram stop in order to accommodate coupled trains with a length of 75 metres. After the platforms are lengthened, U-OV could start running trams with passengers in mid-2022 between Jaarbeursplein and Utrecht CS Centrumzijde. This would eliminate the 300-metre walk for passengers transferring between the SUNIJ and Uithof lines at Utrecht Centraal.

== Vehicles ==
=== High-floor trams ===
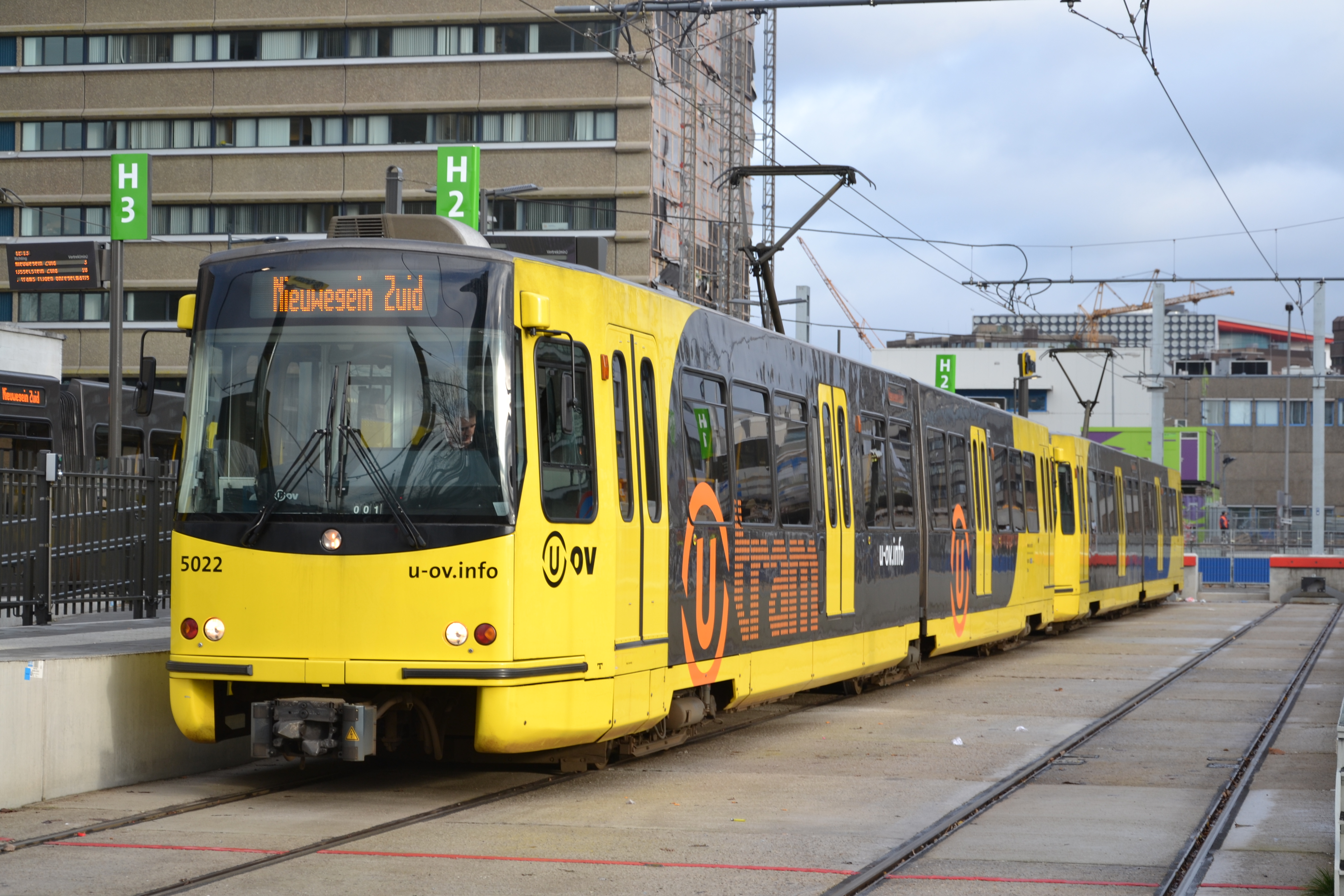
SIG high-floor tram

From 1983 to 2020, the SUNIJ-lijn used 27 single-articulated, high-floor trams built by Schweizerische Industrie Gesellschaft (SIG). These trams weighed 37.5 ton, were 30 metres (98 feet) long and were capable of a maximum speed of 80 km/h (50 mph). In 2012, the SIG-trams were renovated including bogies, air-conditioning, seats and repainting. The last run of the SIG trams was on 3 July 2020. On 4 July, the SUNIJ-lijn was fully shut down to renovate the line, and lower and lengthen its platforms to accommodate low-floor trams. The SIG-trams have been replaced by CAF low-floor trams.

After the closure of the SUNIJ line, all SIG trams but one were scrapped. On 30 November 2020, SIG-tram 5017 was shipped along with spare parts to the Nederlands Transport Museum in Nieuw-Vennep for preservation. The museum intends to operate the tram carrying riders to attractions within Park 21, an event park under development in Haarlemmermeer.

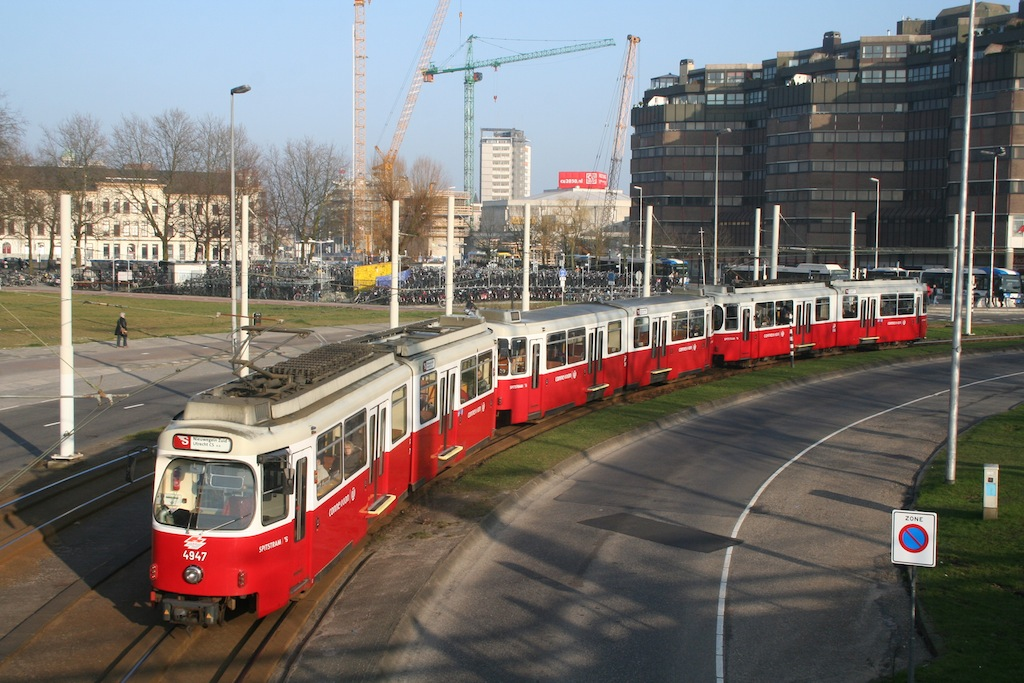
Vienna trams purchased second-hand

In 2008, Utrecht purchased trams built in the 1980s from Vienna at a cost of 837,000 euros. The Vienna trams (de Weense trams) were delivered to Utrecht in 2009. The trams required some adjustments before going into service. They received a new onboard computer and a mobile telephone to communicate with central dispatchers. Adjustments were required to tram doorways and the platform height. These trams were used only during rush hours at the busiest stops between Utrecht Centraal and Nieuwegein Stadscentrum. Special sign boards indicated to passengers where the Vienna trams stopped. When received, the trams had no noteworthy defects, and they had run well in Vienna. However, in Utrecht the Vienna trams had technical problems costing the operator 3.2 million euros in maintenance; they also caused extra wear to the rails. The rise in ridership expected in 2008 when the trams were purchased did not materialize. The trams were sold to Krakow, Poland and were disposed of by the summer of 2014.

=== Low-floor trams ===
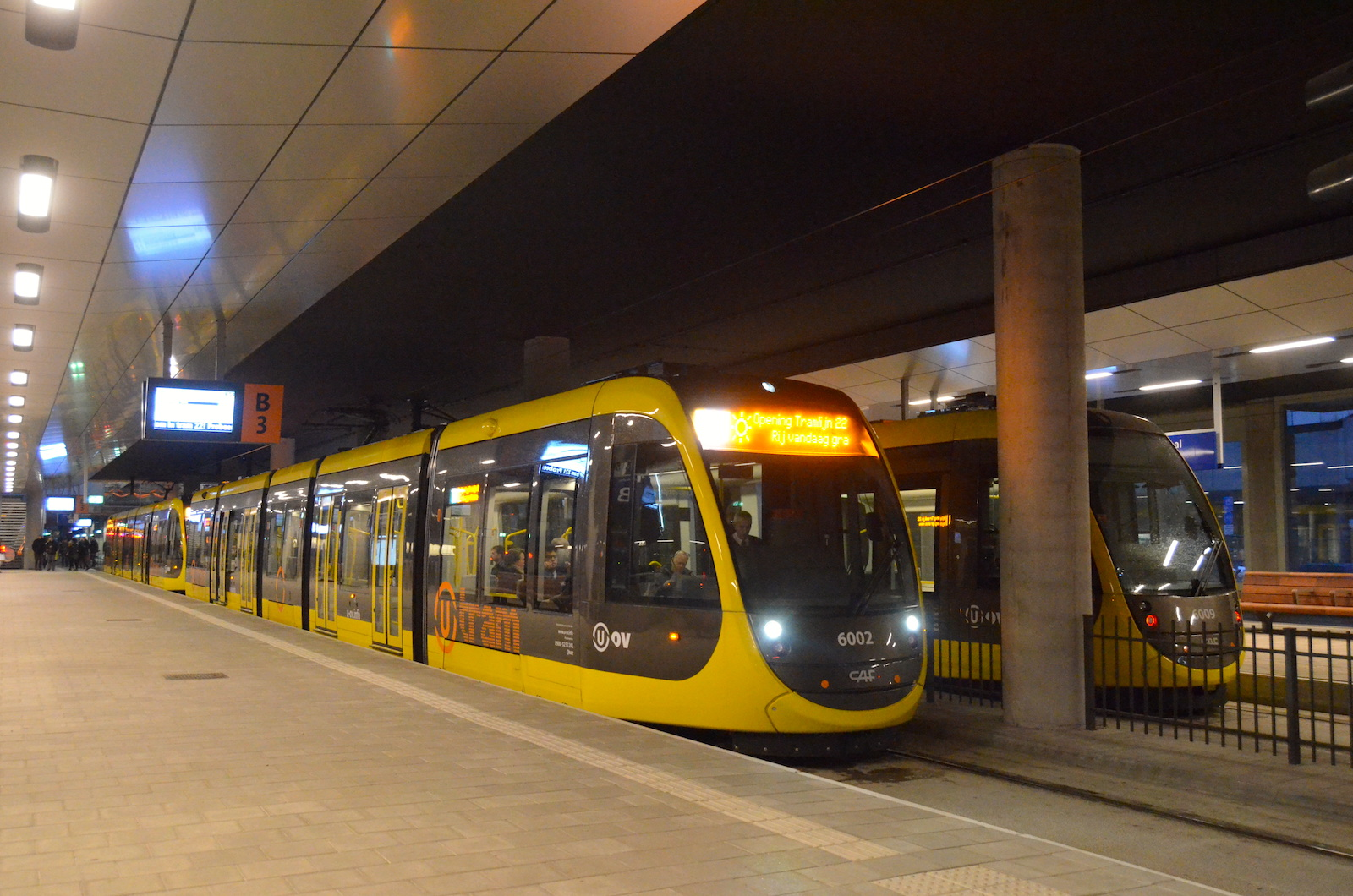
CAF trams at Utrecht CS Centrumzijde, terminal of the Uithoflijn

The new generation of trams are articulated, low-floor Urbos 100 trams built by Construcciones y Auxiliar de Ferrocarriles (CAF). Two versions were ordered: a shorter version with 5 articulated sections and a longer version with 7:

Characteristic	5-section	7-section
Articulated sections	5	7
Number ordered	27	22
Length	32.966 m (108 ft 1.9 in)	41.19 m (135 ft 2 in)
Width	2.65 m (8 ft 8 in)	
Passenger capacity	306	350
In service	December 2019	December 2020

In operation, two trams, one of each length, are coupled together yielding a train length of 75 metres (246 feet) and providing a capacity of about 490 passengers. As of December 2025, U-OV has 54 trams in total.

=== Storage and maintenance ===
The depot (Tramremise Nieuwegein) on the SUNIJ-lijn is the main storage and maintenance facility of the sneltram system, handling both low- and high-floor trams. The depot building houses:

- offices
- traffic control for trams and busses
- check-in area for tram operators
- workshops for the maintenance of trams
- service department to handle emergencies and breakdowns

There are 8 tracks through the workshop including one for the tram wash. Outside in the yard, there is space to store the fleet of trams. The roof of the workshop building has 810 solar panels able to produce 292 kilowatts of electricity.

Just beyond the P+R Science Park stop on the Uithoflijn, there are additional storage tracks.

== See also ==
- Amsteltram about the conversion of a high-floor sneltram line to low-floor trams in Amstelveen
- List of town tramway systems in the Netherlands
