= Nieuwegein-Zuid (tram stop) =

Tram stop in Nieuwegein, the Netherlands

Nieuwegein-Zuid is a tram stop of the Utrecht sneltram network, located in the most southern part of Nieuwegein. The stop opened in 1983. Today it is the terminus of tram route 20 from Utrecht Central Station and P+R Science Park. It connects the Hoog-Zandveld neighbourhood of Nieuwegein with IJsselstein and Utrecht. It is located right next to a shopping center.

== Following route ==
- Tram 20 to the north: Nieuwegein City (tram stop), Utrecht Central Station, P+R Science Park (Uithof)
- Tram 20 to the south: terminus
