= Van Rijn =

Van Rijn is a Dutch toponymic surname meaning "from (the) Rhine river". Common spelling variations are Van Rhijn and the anglicized version Van Ryn. People with this surname include:

Van Rijn

- Anna van Rijn (ca.1512–1607), Dutch philanthropist
- Rembrandt van Rijn (1606–1669), Dutch painter and etcher
- Titus van Rijn (1641–1668), single surviving child of Rembrandt and Saskia van Uylenburgh
- Guido van Rijn (born 1950), Dutch blues and gospel historian
- Martin van Rijn (born 1956), Dutch business leader and politician
- Michel van Rijn (1950–2024), Dutch art smuggler, trader and investigator
- Karen van Rijn (born 1960s), Dutch cricketer
- Wilma van Rijn née van Hofwegen (born 1971), Dutch freestyle swimmer
- Rolf van Rijn (born 1972), Dutch basketball player

Van Reijn

- Theo van Reijn (1884–1954), Dutch sculptor

Van Rhijn

- Johannes Jacobus van Rhijn (1742–1808), Old Catholic Archbishop of Utrecht
- Pieter Johannes van Rhijn (1886–1960), Dutch astronomer
  - 2203 van Rhijn (asteroid) and Van Rhijn (crater) named after him
- Albertus Johannes Roux van Rhijn (1890–1971), South African politician and diplomat
- Aart van Rhijn (1892–1986), Dutch government minister and state secretary
- Willem van Rhijn (1903–1979), Dutch modern pentathlete
- Piet van Rhijn (1931–1999), Dutch footballer
- Lia van Rhijn (born 1953), Dutch ceramist and sculptor
- Marlou van Rhijn (born 1991), Dutch Paralympic sprint runner
- Ricardo van Rhijn (born 1991), Dutch footballer

Van Rhyn

- Ernst van Rhyn (born 1997), South African rugby player

Van Ryn

- John Van Ryn (1905–1999), American tennis player
- Marjorie Van Ryn née Gladman (1908–1999), American tennis player
- Ben Van Ryn (born 1971), American baseball player
- Mike Van Ryn (born 1979), Canadian ice hockey player
- Laura Van Ryn (1984–2006), American car crash victim with mistaken identity

== Fictional characters ==
- Nicholas van Rijn (2376 to c. 2500 AD), main character in Poul Anderson's science fiction novels
- The van Rhijn family is one of the leading families in HBO’s period drama The Gilded Age.

== See also ==
- Van der Ryn, surname of same origin
- Vanryn, extraterrestrials from the planet Ryn in the science fiction novel The Haunted Stars
- Anna van Rijn College, Dutch secondary school named after Anna van Rijn (1512–1607)
- Van Ryn & DeGelleke, American architectural firm co-founded by Henry J. Van Ryn (1864–1951)
