= Nieuwegein City (tram stop) =

Tram stop in Nieuwegein, the Netherlands

Coordinates: 52.0289°N 5.0792°E

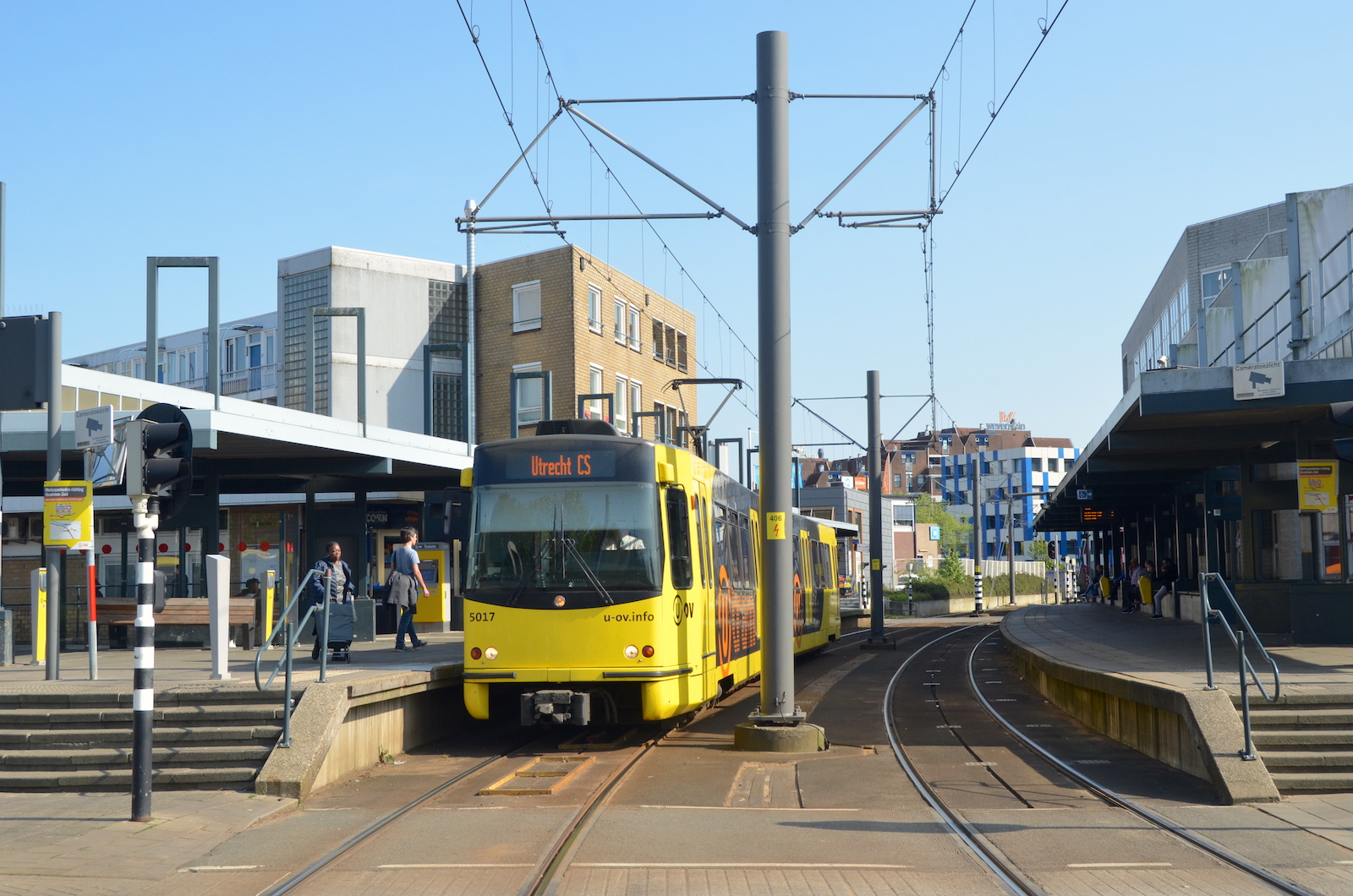
High-platform tram at the first Stadscentrum stop, decommissioned in 2020

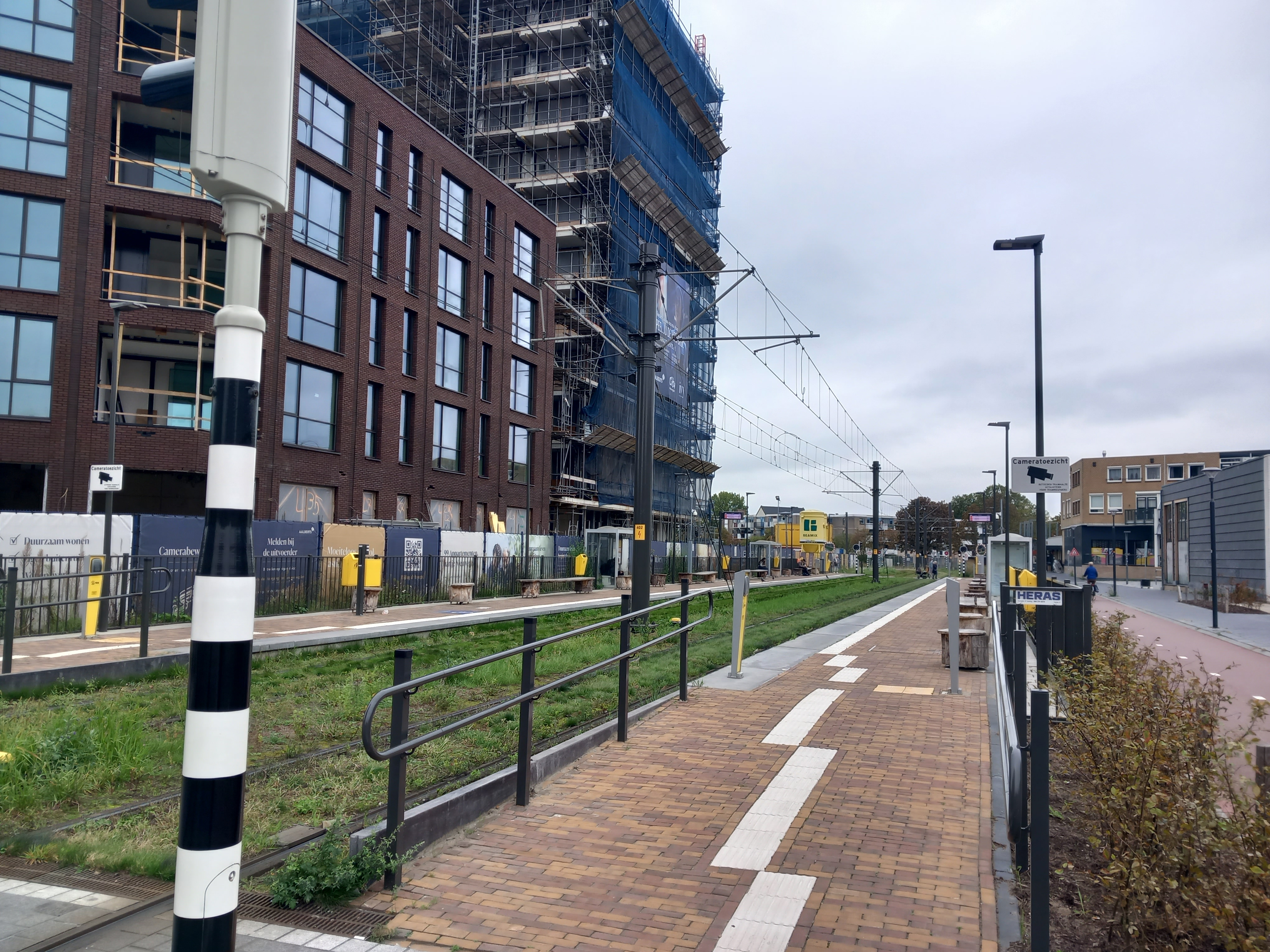
Nieuwegein-City stop in 2023

Nieuwegein City (formerly Stadscentrum) is a tram stop of the Utrecht sneltram network, located beside the Nieuwegein Cityplaza shopping mall in Nieuwegein. It is along the SUNIJ (sneltram Utrecht-Nieuwegein-IJsselstein) line which runs south from the Jaarbeursplein and Centrumzijde stops at Utrecht Centraal railway station. South of the Nieuwegein City stop is the main junction of the sneltram network where southbound trams from Utrecht branch to either IJsselstein-Zuid and Nieuwegein-Zuid, tram routes 20 and 21 respectively. (Prior to July 2022, tram routes 60 and 61 served the stop. But these routes were renumbered to 20 and 21 respectively with the introduction of through-routing over the Uithof line to P+R Science Park eliminating a change in trams at Utrecht Centraal station.)

With the exception of the tram stops at Utrecht Centraal, Nieuwegein City is the busiest tram stop on the Utrecht tram system. In 2018, the daily tram ridership at the stop was 2,000 per day in addition to 1,400 bus riders. The hub is expected to serve 5,000 riders per day in future.

Until 30 May 2020, the Nieuwegein City stop (then Stadscentrum) had high platforms and was located on the north side of the street Passage at the entrance to the Cityplaza shopping mall. After that date, the line was then shut down to lower and lengthen the tram platforms along the SUNIJ line to accommodate new low-floor trams. The original high-platform Stadscentrum stop was decommissioned. After the line reopened on 3 January 2021, the tram stop had been temporarily relocated northwards parallel to the street Spoorstede between the streets Schouwstede and Hagestede. Between 26 February and 8 July 2022, the line to Nieuwegein and IJsselstein was again shut down (south of P+R Westraven) in order to relocate the Stadscentrum tram stop and realign the tracks. When the stop reopened on 9 July 2022, it was renamed from Stadscentrum to Nieuwegein City. The relocation of the tram stop was part of a larger redevelopment effort at City Nieuwegein. The buildings south-west of the tram tracks were demolished in order to construct 1600 new residences. The demolition allowed the tram tracks to be shifted in that direction.

Today, the location of the Nieuwegein City stop is between the streets Passage and Weverstede. The stop is wheelchair-accessible from both ends of each platform. Because of the presence of many pedestrians and cyclists near the stop, the maximum speed for trams going through this area is 20 km/h. Upon reopening on 9 July 2022, the new stop had temporary shelters on the platforms pending the erection of a permanent canopy. There is a bus terminal located at the north-east corner of the tram right-of-way and the street Schouwstede.

There is an emergency crossover to the north of the Nieuwegein City stop. This crossover will be available to turn back trams that arrive from Utrecht at the southbound platform.

In 2025, construction started on a new adjacent bus station with an expected completion in September 2026. It will be located at the south-west corner of the streets Schouwstede and Spoorstede. The bus station will have eight bus bays plus a drop-off platform for electric buses. A leaf-shaped, transparent canopy will cover the installation. The canopy will capture rain water for storage and use in nearby toilettes. The tram platforms will also receive a similar canopy.

== Routes ==
- Tram 20/21 to the north: Utrecht Central Station
- Tram 20 to the south: Nieuwegein-Zuid
- Tram 21 to the south: Binnenstad and IJsselstein-Zuid
