= Anna van Rijn =

Dutch philanthropist, c. 1550 – c. 1607

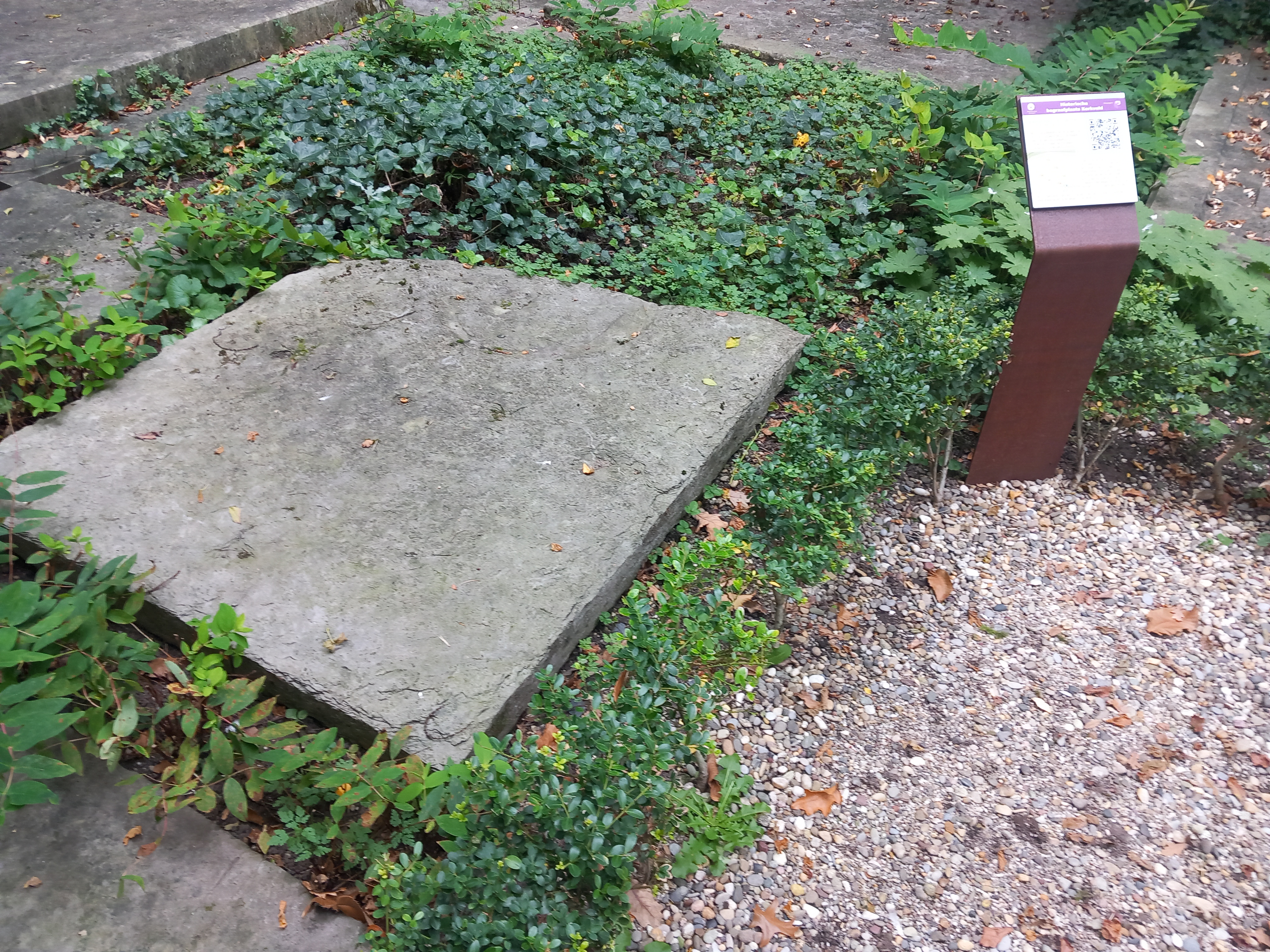
Family grave of the Van Rijn family at the Kerkveld cemetery in Nieuwegein.

Johanna van Rijn van Jutphaes, better known as Anna van Rijn (c. 1520 – c. 1607), was a Dutch philanthropist who founded a charity school and a village school.

She is listed in the 1001 Vrouwen uit de Nederlandse geschiedenis; 1001 biographies of famous women of the Netherlands.

== Activities ==
Anna van Rijn is known for her charitable work for the poor in Jutphaas. In 1595, she formalized a foundation that provided twelve poor individuals with six stuivers every Sunday, under the condition that they did not beg and prayed for the founder. After her death, two Catholic priests oversaw the continuation of this charity according to her instructions.

In 1603, Anna van Rijn had five one-room houses built for impoverished residents over the age of fifty in Jutphaas. These homes were known as 'Godskameren' (almshouses). In 1604, she arranged housing for a schoolmaster in one of these almshouses, enabling him to teach poor children. She paid the schoolmaster an annual salary of 25 guilders so that children from needy families in Jutphaas could receive free education. Children from wealthier families could also attend but were required to pay a small tuition fee: a few stuivers per month. Classes were held in a wooden shed next to the schoolmaster's house.

In her final will and testament (1607), Anna van Rijn reaffirmed her charitable initiatives. The distribution of money, clothing, and peat for fuel, the weekly payments to the twelve poor, and the maintenance of the almshouses were all detailed in this document.

== Legacy ==
In 1994, a secondary school in Nieuwegein was named after her: the Anna van Rijn College. Since then, the school has occasionally organized an "Anna van Rijn Lecture" in her honor.

The municipality of Nieuwegein also established an award in her name. The Anna van Rijn Medal is presented to individuals who have made extraordinary voluntary contributions in the social, cultural, religious, or sports sectors.
