= Anna van Rijn College =

Location
- Albatros; Nieuwegein; Netherlands

Information
- Type: Highschool
- Established: 1994
- Director: M. Nomes
- Gender: Coeducational
- Age: 12 to 18
- Website: www.annavanrijn.nl

Anna van Rijn College is a secondary school in the town of Nieuwegein. The school teaches all forms of Dutch secondary education. In November 2020, Mr M. Nomes was appointed as director.

The school is named after Anna van Rijn. She set up an almshouse and village school.
