= Van der Ryn =

Van der Ryn is a surname. Notable people with the surname include:

- Ethan Van der Ryn (born 1962), American sound editor
- Sim Van der Ryn (1935–2024), American architect, researcher, and educator

== See also ==
- Van Rijn, Dutch surname with the same origin
