= Jasper van Dijk =

Dutch politician (born 1971)

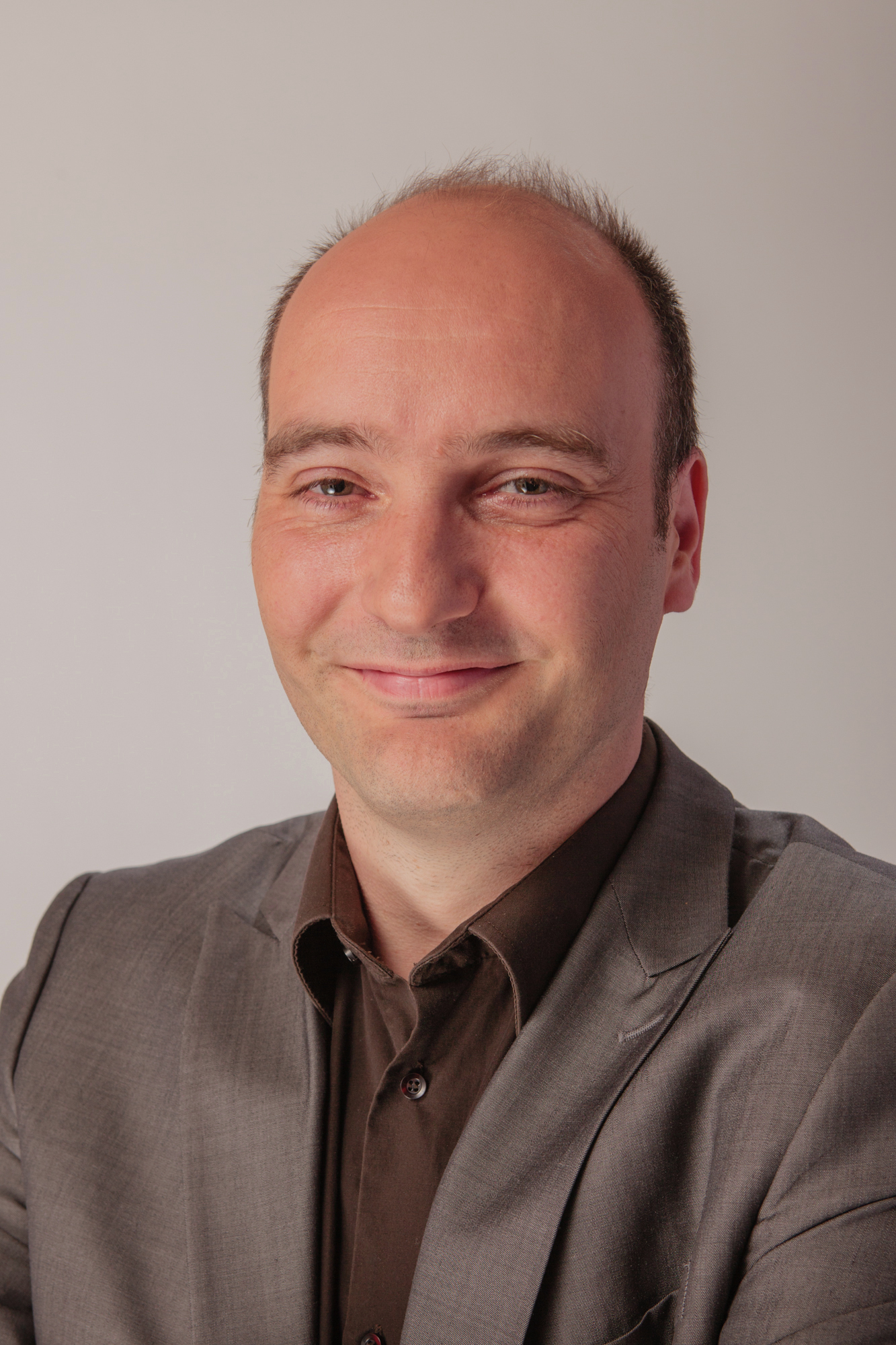

Member of the House of Representatives
- In office 30 November 2006 – 5 December 2023

Personal details
- Born: Jasper Jonathan van Dijk; 20 April 1971 (age 55) Jutphaas, Netherlands
- Party: Socialist Party
- Education: University of Amsterdam
- Occupation: Politician

Jasper Jonathan van Dijk (born 20 April 1971) is a Dutch politician and former civil servant. As a member of the Socialist Party (SP), from November 2006 to December 2023 he has served as a member of the House of Representatives. He focuses on matters of education and the Dutch defence.

From March to November 2006 he was briefly a member of the municipal council of Amsterdam. Van Dijk studied political science at the University of Amsterdam. In 1990 he lived for a year in the Israeli kibbutz of HaSolelim near Nazareth.

== Electoral history ==
Electoral history of Jasper van Dijk
Year	Body	Party	Pos.	Votes	Result		Ref.
Year	Body	Party	Pos.	Votes	Party seats	Individual	Ref.
2003	House of Representatives	Socialist Party	17	328	9	Lost	
2006	House of Representatives	Socialist Party	13	1,372	25	Won	
2010	House of Representatives	Socialist Party	9	1,785	15	Won	
2012	House of Representatives	Socialist Party	8	1,506	15	Won	
2017	House of Representatives	Socialist Party	14	1,343	14	Won	
2021	House of Representatives	Socialist Party	9	1,338	9	Won	
2023	House of Representatives	Socialist Party	9	1,641	5	Lost	
