= Mark Snoeren =

Member of the Dutch House of Representatives

Member of the House of Representatives
- In office 22 September 2020 – 30 March 2021
- Preceded by: Anne Mulder

Member of the Nieuwegein municipal council
- In office 11 March 2010 – 29 March 2022

Personal details
- Born: M.A.J. Snoeren; 25 August 1974 (age 52) Udenhout, Netherlands
- Party: People's Party for Freedom and Democracy
- Children: 2
- Education: The Hague University of Applied Sciences; Leiden University

Mark A.J. Snoeren (born 25 August 1974) is a Dutch politician, who served as a member of the House of Representatives between September 2020 and March 2021. He is a member of the People's Party for Freedom and Democracy (VVD). Snoeren has worked for the Royal Marechaussee, and he owns a business in Nieuwegein. He also held a seat in that town's municipal council for twelve years.

== Early life and non-political career ==
He was born in 1974 in the North Brabant village Udenhout. He followed training to become a non-commissioned officer of the Royal Marechaussee and later served as a commissioned officer. He is still a Marechaussee reserve officer. Snoeren subsequently worked as a manager at the municipal government of Lingewaard, as a safety program manager at Nederlandse Spoorwegen, and as a strategic advisor at TenneT, a transition system operator. While being employed, he studied public management at The Hague University of Applied Sciences and earned a Master of Public Administration degree from Leiden University.

In September 2017, Snoeren took over the dry ski slope Skipiste Nieuwegein. When somebody set fire to the ski slope's restaurant at night one year later, Snoeren managed to extinguish it, limiting the damage.

== Politics ==
Snoeren entered Nieuwegein politics in March 2010 when he became a member of its municipal council after the municipal elections. His party received a plurality of the seats. After his second term began in 2014, he became the VVD's party leader in the Nieuwegein council. He was re-elected in 2018 as his party's lijsttrekker. In the next election in 2022, Snoeren was one of the VVD's lijstduwers. He became a member of the Order of Orange-Nassau upon his farewell from the council on 29 March 2022.

=== House of Representatives (2020–2021) ===
Snoeren was placed 51st on the VVD's party list during the 2017 general election. He was not elected, as his party received 33 seats and his 1,906 votes were not enough to meet the preferential vote threshold. He had also been on the VVD's party list in 2012 (place 66).

When MP Anne Mulder vacated his seat in 2020 in order to become an alderman in The Hague, Snoeren succeeded him because of his position on the 2017 party list. He was sworn into office on 22 September. He remained a member of the Nieuwegein municipal council with public order, safety, international policy, and governmental renewal as specialties, but he left from his position as party leader two days later. Snoeren was on the parliamentary Committees for Defence and for the Interior. Within his party, he was the spokesperson on lower governments and veterans' policy.

He decided not to run for re-election in March 2021, as he wanted to focus on his business. His term ended on 31 March.

== Personal life ==
While an MP, Snoeren lived in the Utrecht town Nieuwegein with his wife and two daughters.
