= Vreeswijk =

District in Nieuwegijn, Netherlands, former municipality

Coordinates: 52°00′N 5°06′E

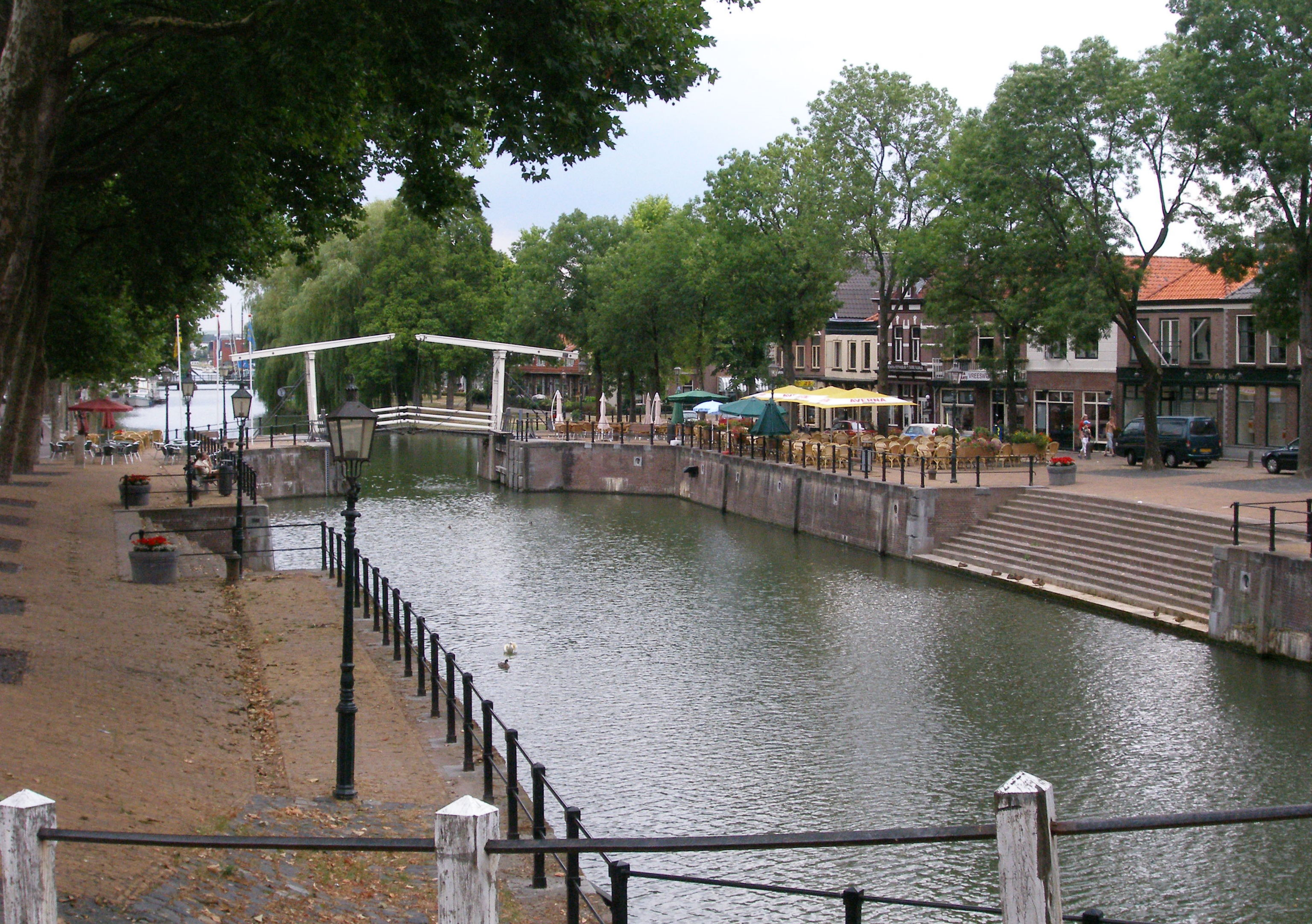
The old sluice

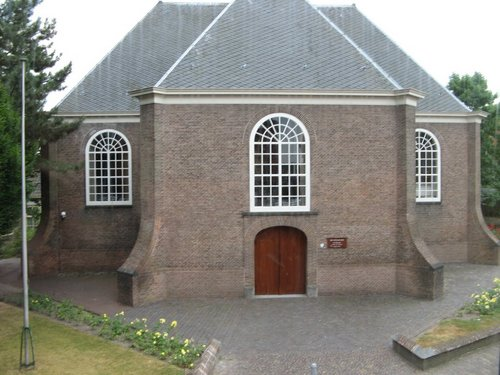
Church in the Molenstraat

Vreeswijk is a former village and municipality in the Dutch province of Utrecht. The municipality merged with Jutphaas in 1971, and is now the southern half of the town of Nieuwegein. The former village was located on the Lek River, near where it is crossed by the Merwede Canal.

== Name ==
The name Vreeswijk is documented in an 11th-century text as Fresionovvic ('Fresion wic'). Other medieval spellings are Vresewijk, Vresewike, Vrieswijc, and Vreeswijck. The place name is combination of Fresia meaning 'Frisian' and wic meaning 'farmstead or settlement', thus settlement of Frisians.

== History ==
The old village centre on the locks has been preserved reasonably well. This lock is said to be the oldest example of a pound lock in Europe. This was the key innovation which gave rise to the modern canal, by virtue of having two gates, although it was a larger basin capable of holding a number of ships at once. The Lek River was normally at a slightly higher level than the canal leading to Utrecht and in times of flood was very much higher, so that it would not be possible to let boats enter or leave without flooding the surrounding land. The additional gate limited the amount of water that needed to be let in, so that only the basin needed to be raised.

== See also ==
- Fresvik, Norway
- Freswick, Scotland
- Friezenwijk (Heukelum), the Netherlands
