= Utrecht Science Park =

Campus in the Netherlands

Coordinates: 52°05′11″N 5°10′21″E

Utrecht Science Park (also known as De Uithof) is a neighbourhood in Utrecht and the largest science park in the Netherlands. It is located to the east of the city. It is the largest campus of Utrecht University. Apart from the faculties of Law, Humanities and University College Utrecht, most of the university buildings are located in Utrecht Science Park. It is also a main location of the HU University of Applied Sciences Utrecht and the University Medical Center Utrecht, and houses the main university library, student housing and botanical gardens.

== History ==
The Dutch government purchased a plot of land of approximately 300 hectares for Utrecht University in 1958. The area was named "De Uithof", after a local farm. The first building, currently known as the Marinus Ruppert Building, opened in 1961.

The city council decided to officially rename De Uithof to "Utrecht Science Park" in 2018.

== Transportation ==
On 14 December 2019, the Uithoflijn line 22 of the Utrecht sneltram (light rail) system opened, connecting Utrecht Centraal railway station to De Uithof. It replaced bus line 12 which used bi-articulated buses. The Uithoflijn has 5 tram stops in De Uithof: Padualaan, Heidelberglaan, UMC, WKZ / Máxima and the tram terminal P+R Science Park.

The tram stop P+R Science Park has a large park-and-ride facility, designed by KCAP, construction of which began in August 2011.

== Buildings in De Uithof ==
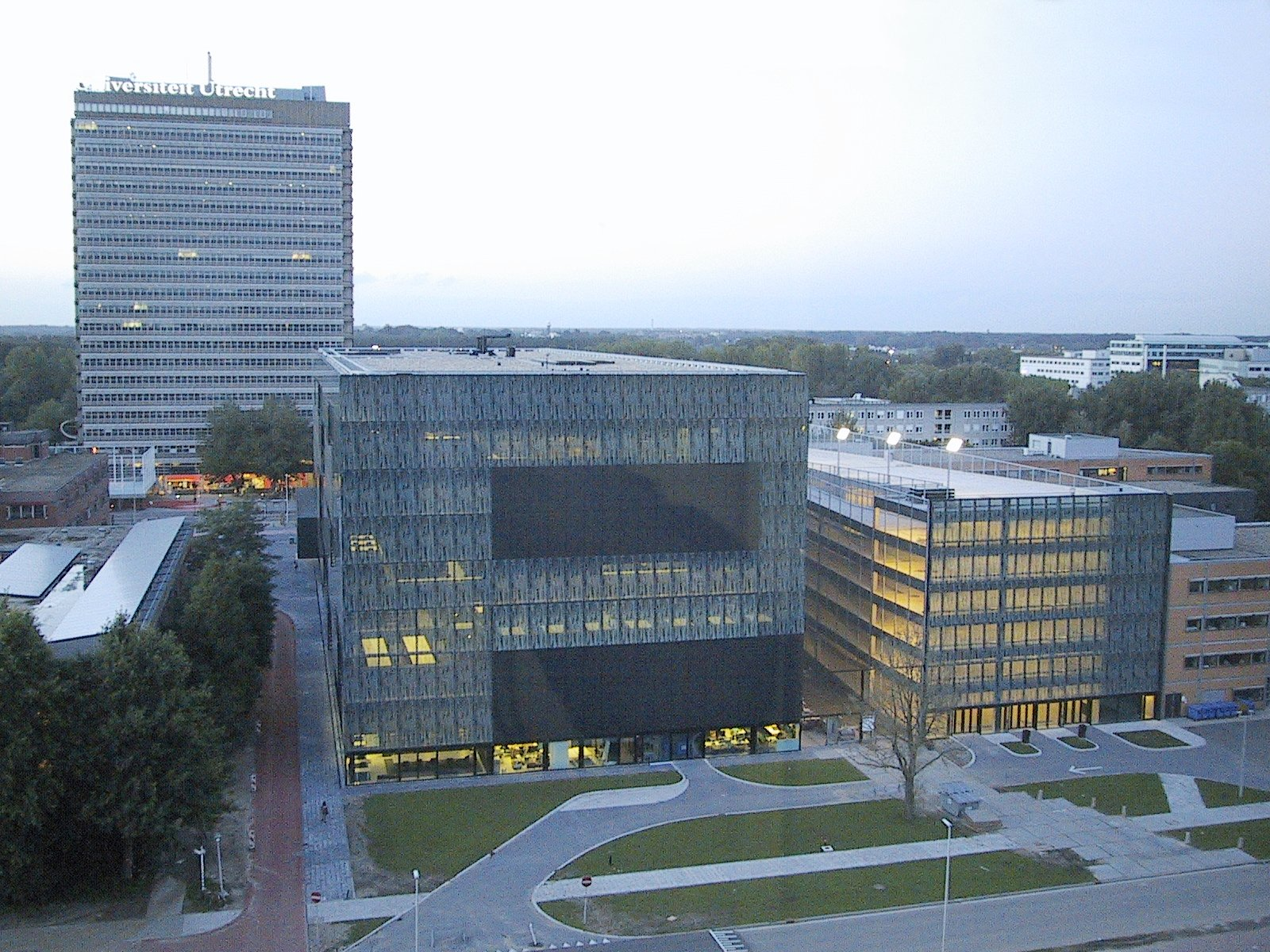
Uithof center

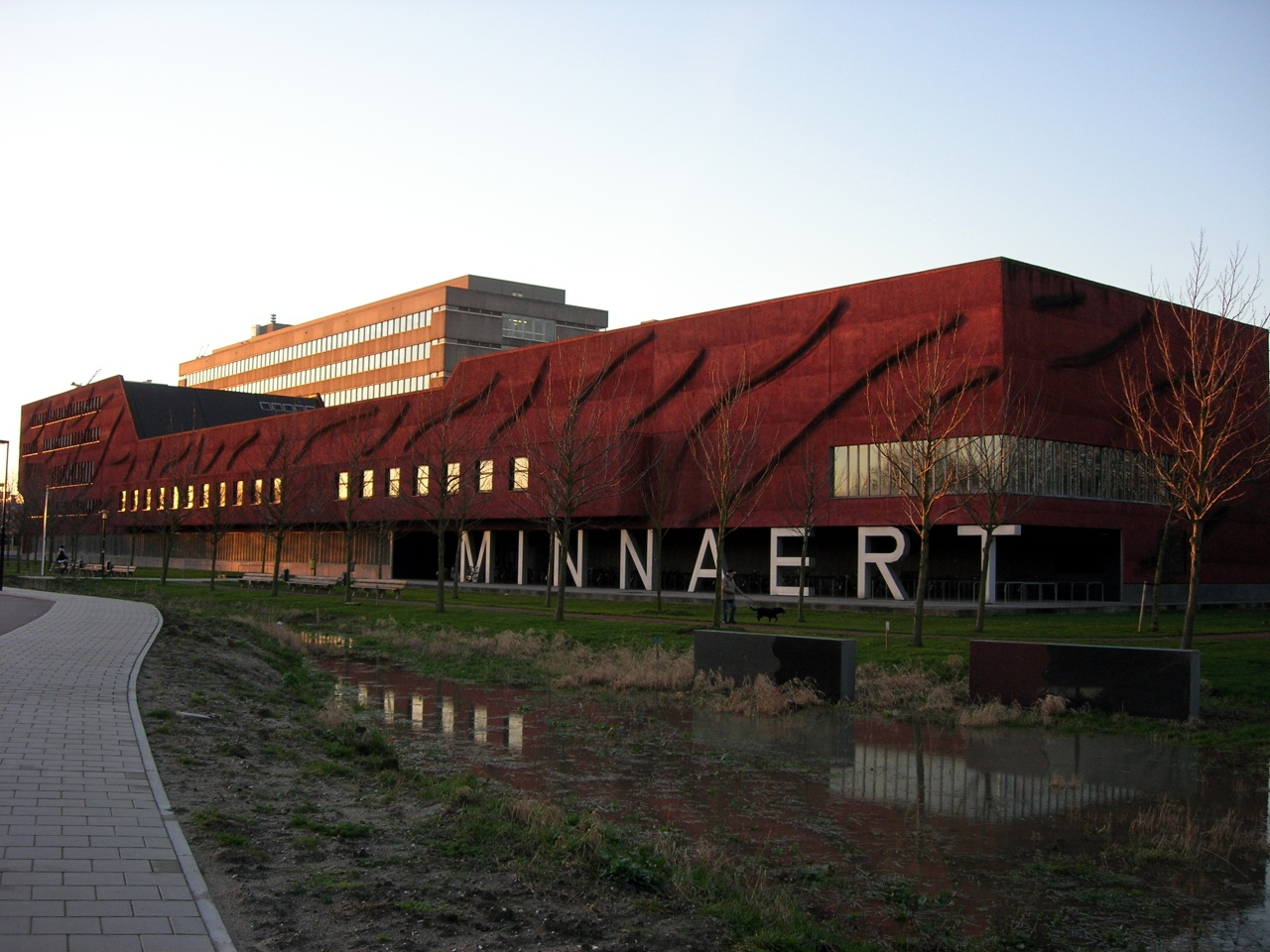
Minnaert building

Some of the buildings on De Uithof have an unusual architecture, and some have won prizes for their architecture. The Educatorium, designed by Rem Koolhaas (1997), contains a glass-bottomed walking bridge and circular walls. The Minnaertgebouw used to contain a large basin that was used to collect rain water, and its outer wall is supported by large characters, M, I, N, N, A, E, R, T. The Universiteitsbibliotheek (University Library), designed by Wiel Arets (2004), is known for its spacious interior and black exterior. All three of these buildings are featured in the book 1001 Buildings You Must See Before You Die.

=== University buildings ===
This is a partial list of buildings at the Utrecht Science Park. The official names of all of the buildings are found here. Many of the buildings are named after scientists that worked in a field which is similar to the specialization of the occupants of the building. The Dutch word "gebouw" means "building".

- Aardwetenschappengebouw (Earth Sciences Building) - geoscience
- Bestuursgebouw – board, management and administration of Utrecht University
- Buys Ballotgebouw (BBG), named after meteorologist C. H. D. Buys Ballot - computer science, experimental physics
- Caroline Bleekergebouw, named after physicist and instrument maker Caroline Bleeker - workshop for scientific instruments
- David de Wiedgebouw, named after pharmacologist David de Wied - pharmacology
- Educatorium - lecture halls
- Hans Freudenthalgebouw, named after mathematician Hans Freudenthal - mathematics
- Hijmans van den Berghgebouw, named after physician Abraham Albert Hijmans van den Bergh – (bio)medical education
- Kruytgebouw (formerly known as Trans-3), named after chemist Hugo R. Kruyt - chemistry, business startups
- Leonard S. Ornsteinlaboratorium, named after physicist Leonard Ornstein - experimental physics
- Marinus Ruppertgebouw (formerly known as Trans-1), named after pedagogue Marinus Ruppert, who started the development of buildings on De Uithof - lecture and workshop halls, computer hall
- Martinus J. Langeveldgebouw (formerly known as Centrumgebouw Zuid), named after Martinus J. Langeveld, Faculty of Social Sciences founder - social science
- Minnaertgebouw, named after astronomer Marcel Minnaert - computer science, physics, geoscience, student services
- Nicolaas Bloembergengebouw, named after physicist Nicolaas Bloembergen – science, NMR spectroscopy
- Robert J. Van de Graafflaboratorium, named after physicist and instrument maker Robert J. Van de Graaff - particle accelerator for physics
- Sjoerd Groenmangebouw (formerly known as Centrumgebouw Noord), named after sociologist Sjoerd Groenman - social science, student services
- Stratenum, named after physician W. van Straaten – medical education
- Universiteitsbibliotheek Uithof - Main library
- Victor J. Koningsbergergebouw, named after biologist Victor Jacob Koningsberger - medicine, geoscience, other science
- Willem C. van Unnikgebouw (formerly known as Trans-2), named after bible scholar Willem C. van Unnik - social science

=== Student housing ===
There are five housing locations with a total of around 3000 rooms, with more under development:

- Cambridgelaan, built in 1998. 1002 rooms.
- De Bisschoppen (the Bishops), built in 2006. 552 rooms.
- Casa Confetti, built in 2008. 377 rooms.
- Johanna, built in 2015. 655 rooms.
- Campus USP 030, built in 2020. 400 rooms.

=== Convenient facilities ===
- SPAR
- Olympos
