= Nieuwegein =

- Municipality
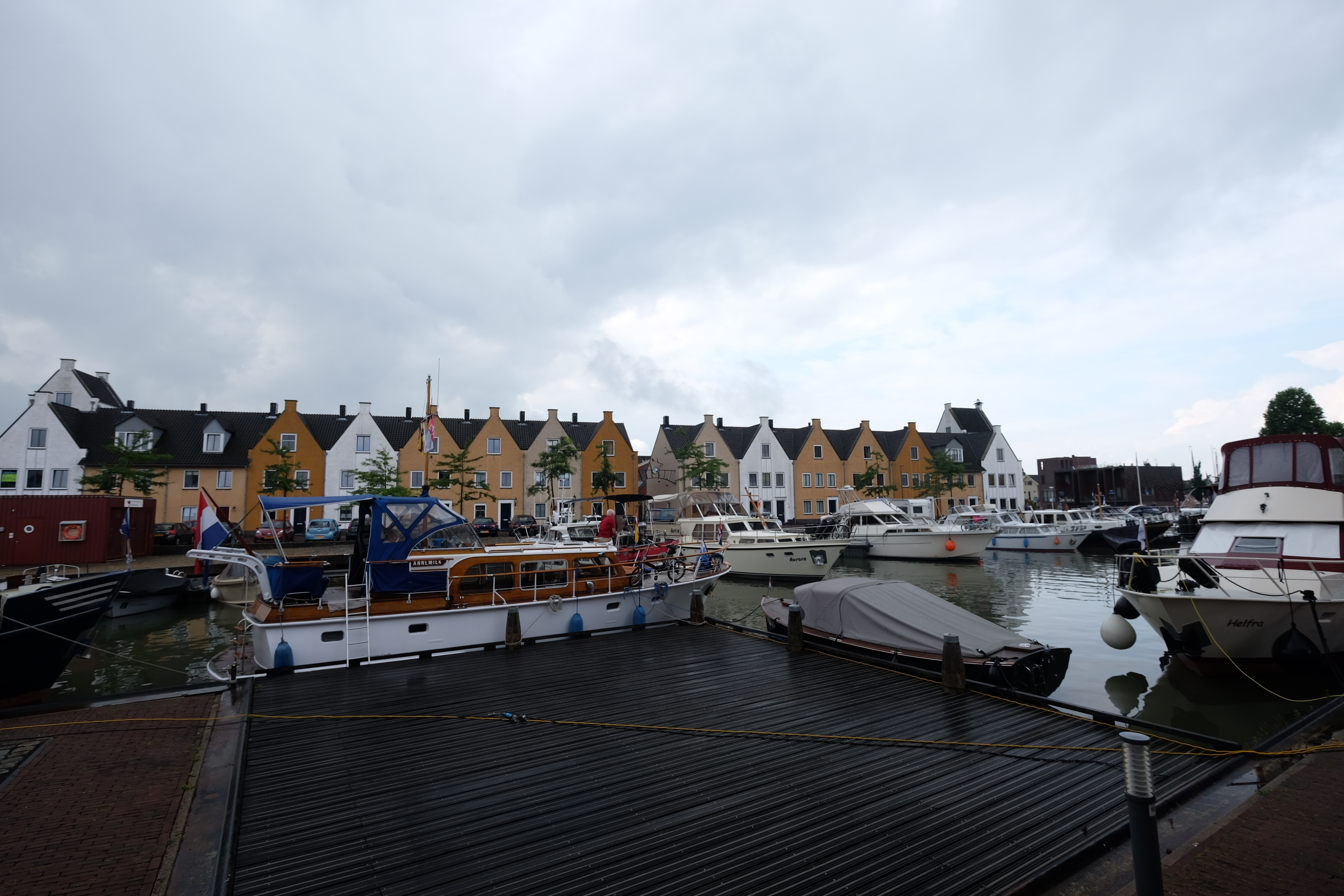
- Canal through Nieuwegein

- Flag Coat of arms

- Location in Utrecht
- Coordinates: 52°2′N 5°5′E
- Country: Netherlands
- Province: Utrecht
- Established: 1 July 1971

Government
  - Body: Municipal council
  - Mayor: Marijke van Beukering (D66)

Area
  - Total: 25.65 km^{2} (9.90 sq mi)
  - Land: 23.51 km^{2} (9.08 sq mi)
  - Water: 2.14 km^{2} (0.83 sq mi)
- Elevation: 1 m (3.3 ft)

Population (January 2021)
  - Total: 63,866
  - Density: 2,717/km^{2} (7,040/sq mi)
- Demonym: Nieuwegeiner
- Time zone: UTC+1 (CET)
  - Summer (DST): UTC+2 (CEST)
- Postcode: 3430–3439
- Area code: 030
- Website: www.nieuwegein.nl
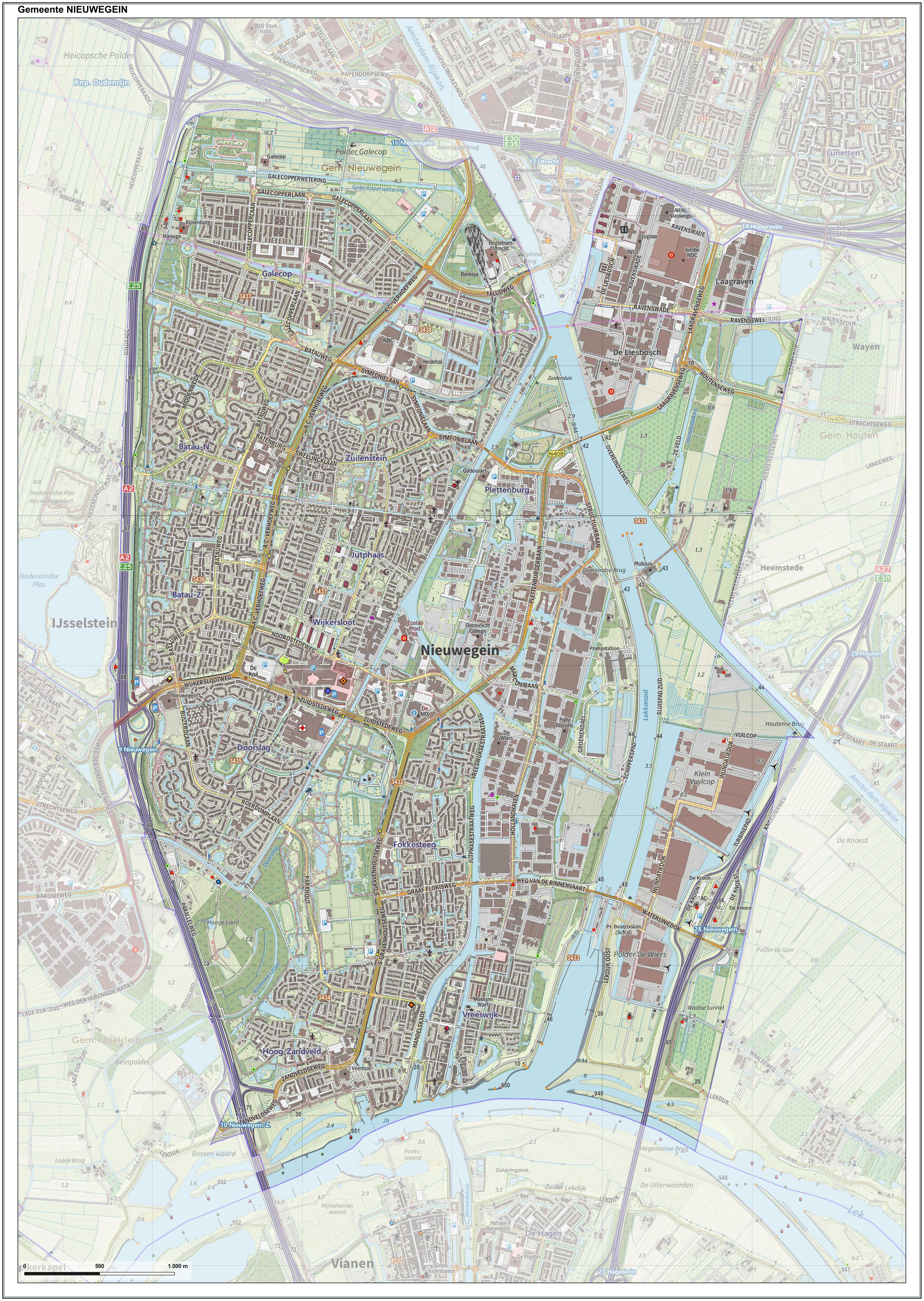
- Map of Nieuwegein, 2017.

Nieuwegein (Dutch pronunciation: [ˌniu.əˈɣɛin]) is a municipality and city in the Dutch province of Utrecht. It is bordered on the north by the city of Utrecht, the provincial capital. It is separated from Vianen to the south by the river Lek and borders on IJsselstein in the southwest and Houten in the east. Nieuwegein had 64,606 inhabitants as of 1 December 2021.

Several national sports federations are housed in Nieuwegein, including the NeVoBo (volleyball), KNZB (swimming), NBb (basketball) and KNCB (cricket).

There are three main secondary schools in the city, including the Anna van Rijn College, Oosterlicht College and the Cals College.

== History ==
Nieuwegein was founded on 1 July 1971 as a planned city, following the merger of the former municipalities of Jutphaas and Vreeswijk. The new town was built for the expanding population of the city of Utrecht, and grew rapidly during the decades following its foundation.

In the area between Jutphaas and Vreeswijk there used to be a settlement named Geyne (Gein). This settlement received city rights in 1295 but was destroyed in 1333, in a war between the Bishop of Utrecht and the Count of Holland. Today only Oudegein House remains from that time. After the boards of Vreeswijk and Jutphaas had debated for some time about the name of the new municipality, they decided to name it after this old settlement - Nieuwegein meaning 'New Gein'.

== Population ==
=== Demographics ===
As of 2016, 50.7% of the population consider themselves religious. The largest denomination are Catholics, which are 27.5% of the population, followed by various Protestant denominations (23.8%), and Islam (5.3%). 14.3% of the Nieuwegein population attends religious service regularly.

=== Social characteristics & issues ===
As of 2017, Nieuwegein has a poverty rate of 4.7% compared to the 5.7% national average.

== Transportation ==
Nieuwegein is surrounded by three motorways (Dutch: autosnelweg), the A2 to the west, the A12 to the north and the A27 to the east.

Nieuwegein is connected to Utrecht and IJsselstein by the Sneltram (light rail) line. There is a pedestrian ferry across the river Lek to Vianen. Three canals flow through Nieuwegein: the Amsterdam-Rhine Canal, the Lek River and the Merwede Canal.

== Buildings ==
In Nieuwegein, there is a mandi (Mandaean temple) called Vereniging Mandi van de Mandeeërs Gemeenschap in Nederland.

== Twin towns ==
- Puławy, Lublin Voivodeship, Poland, was a twin town of Nieuwegein from 1994 to 2020. In July 2020, after Puławy installed a gay-free zone, Nieuwegein ended the partnership.
- Rundu, Kavango East Region, Namibia, was a twin town of Nieuwegein from 1994 to 2021. Because of the state of gay rights in Namibia, the city council decided to end the partnership.

== Notable people ==
- Piet Schrijvers (1946 in Jutphaas – 2022) a Dutch football manager and goalkeeper with 563 club caps
- Veronique Renard (born 1965 in Jutphaas) an author and visual artist
- Jasper van Dijk (born 1971 in Jutphaas) a politician
- Mark Snoeren (born 1974) a politician
- Nine Kooiman (born 1980) a politician and former social worker
- Finne Jager (born 1984) stage name Phynn, a trance and techno DJ and producer
- Manuel "Grubby" Schenkhuizen (born 1986) a professional eSports player
- Sari van Veenendaal (born 1990) a football goalkeeper with Atlético Madrid Femenino, captains the Dutch national team
- Robin de Kruijf (born 1991) a Dutch volleyball player, competed at the 2016 Summer Olympics

== Gallery ==
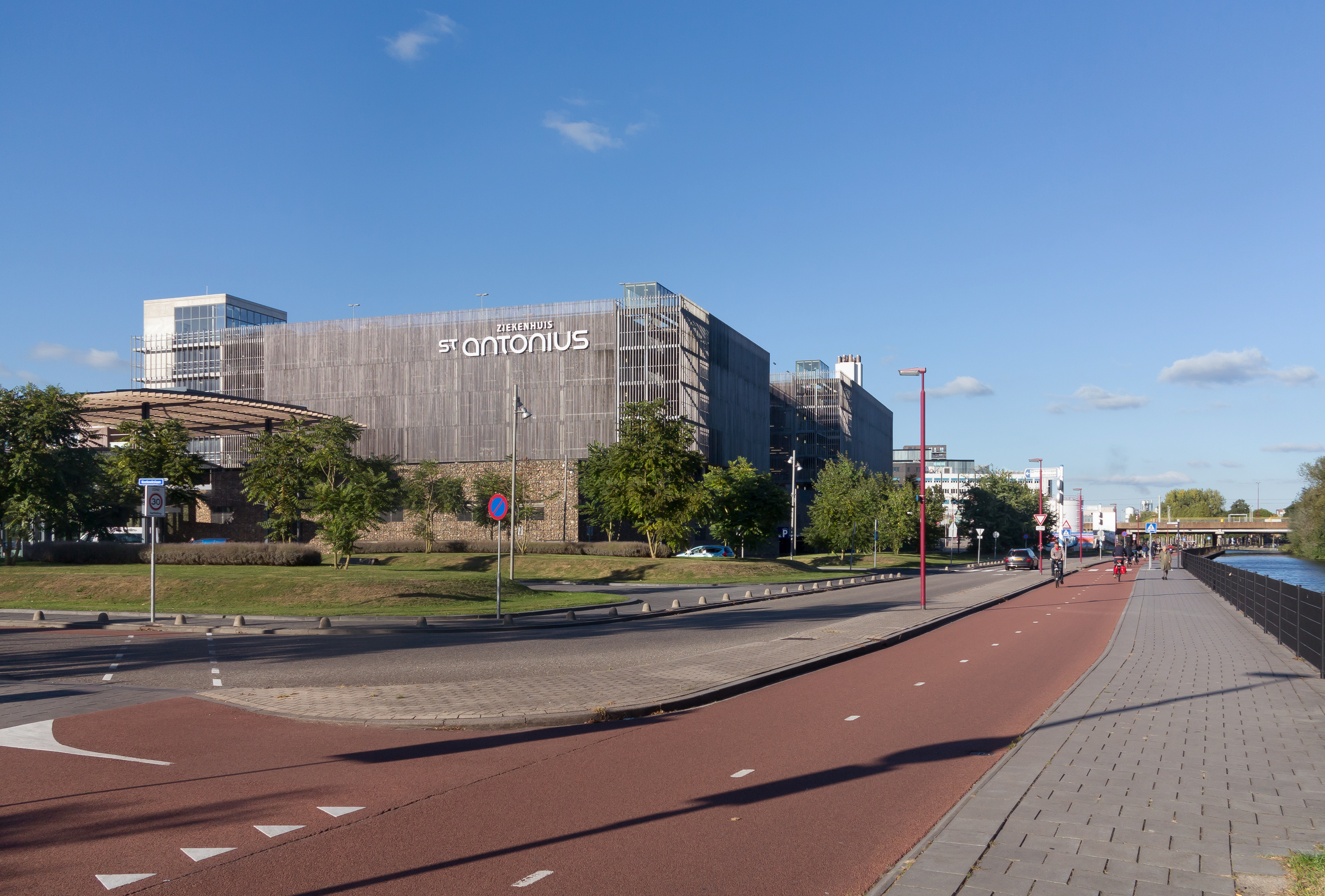
Nieuwegein, hospital

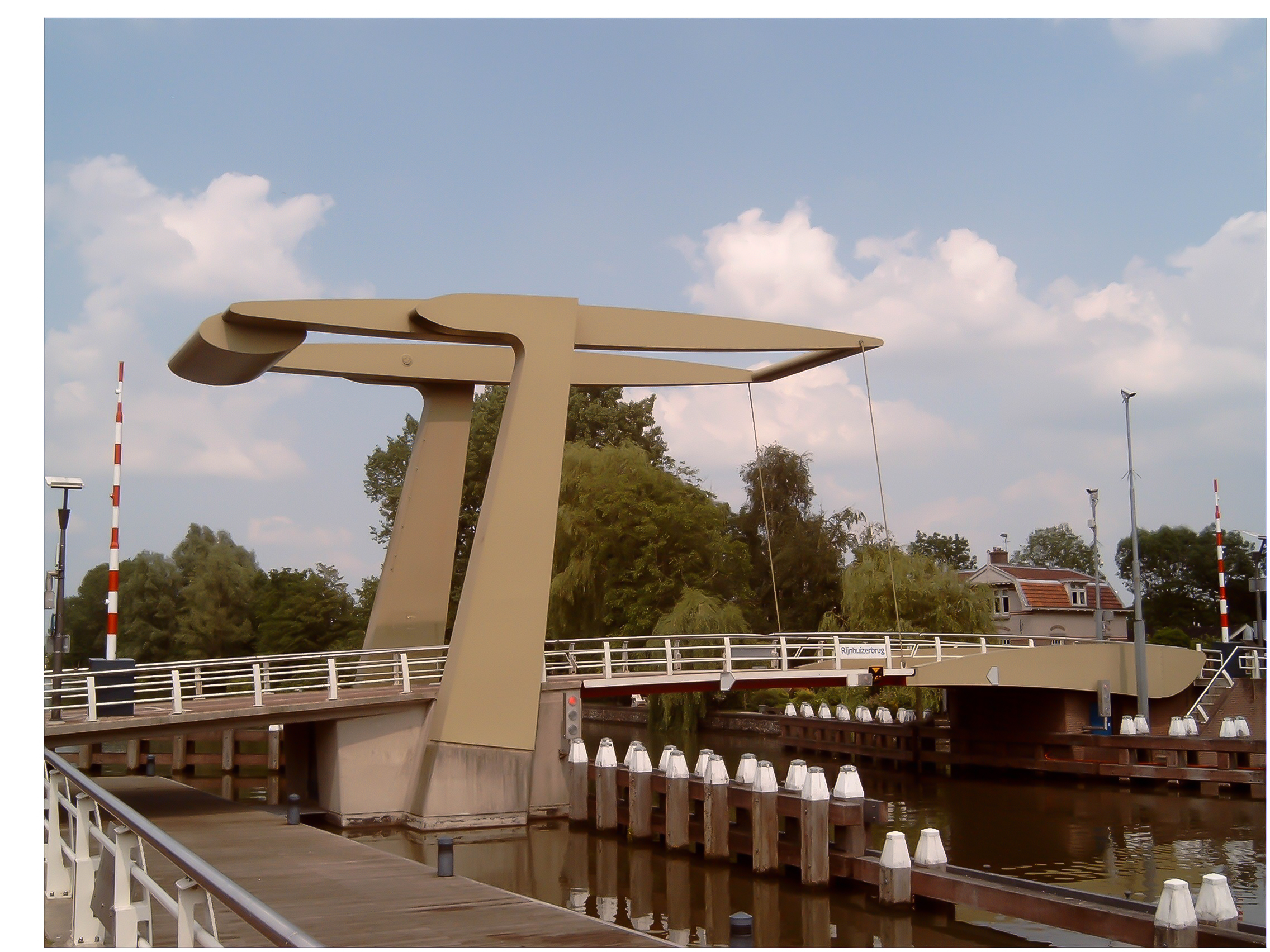
Nieuwegein, drawbridge

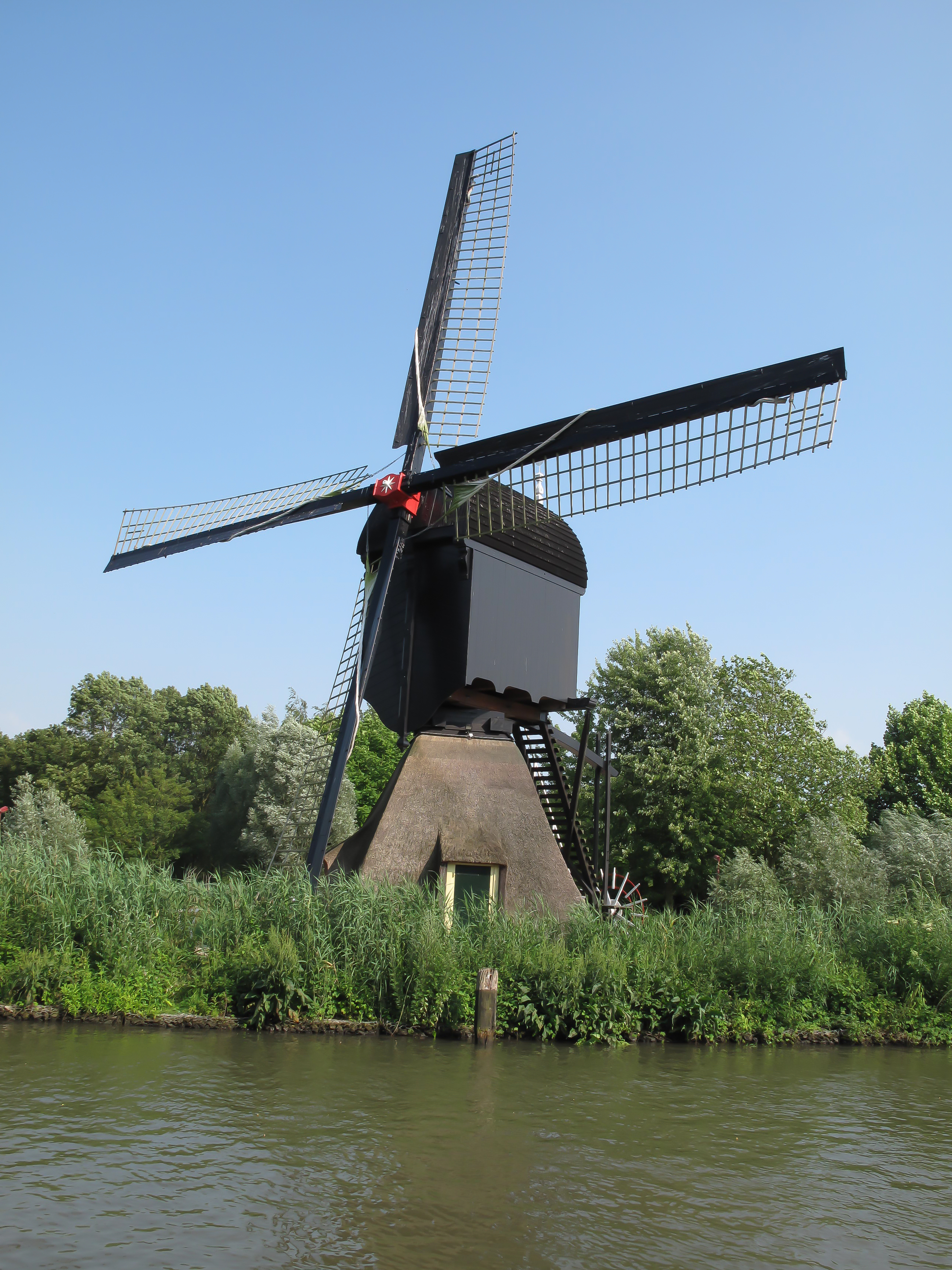
Nieuwegein, windmill

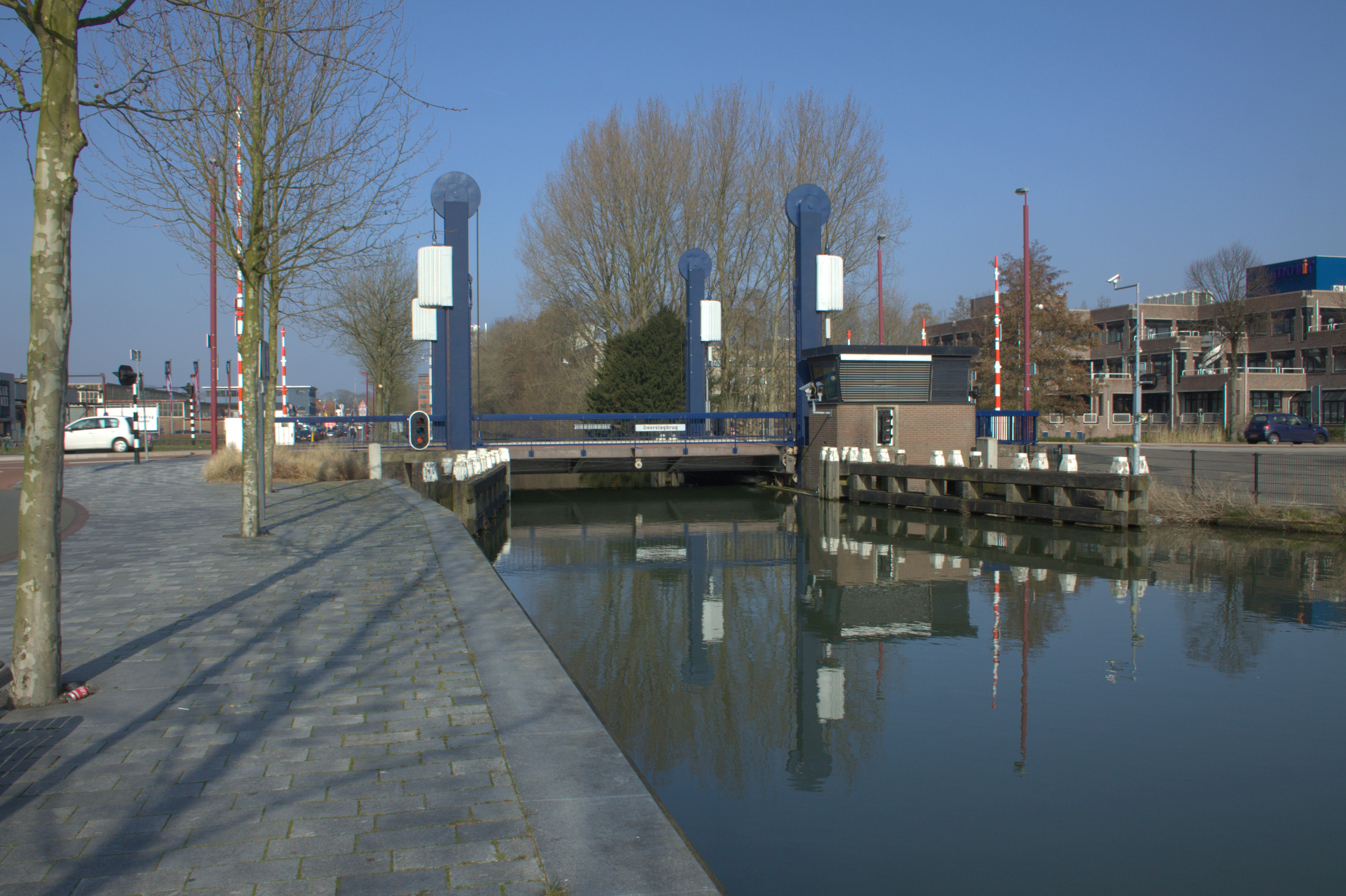
De Liesbosbrug in Nieuwegein

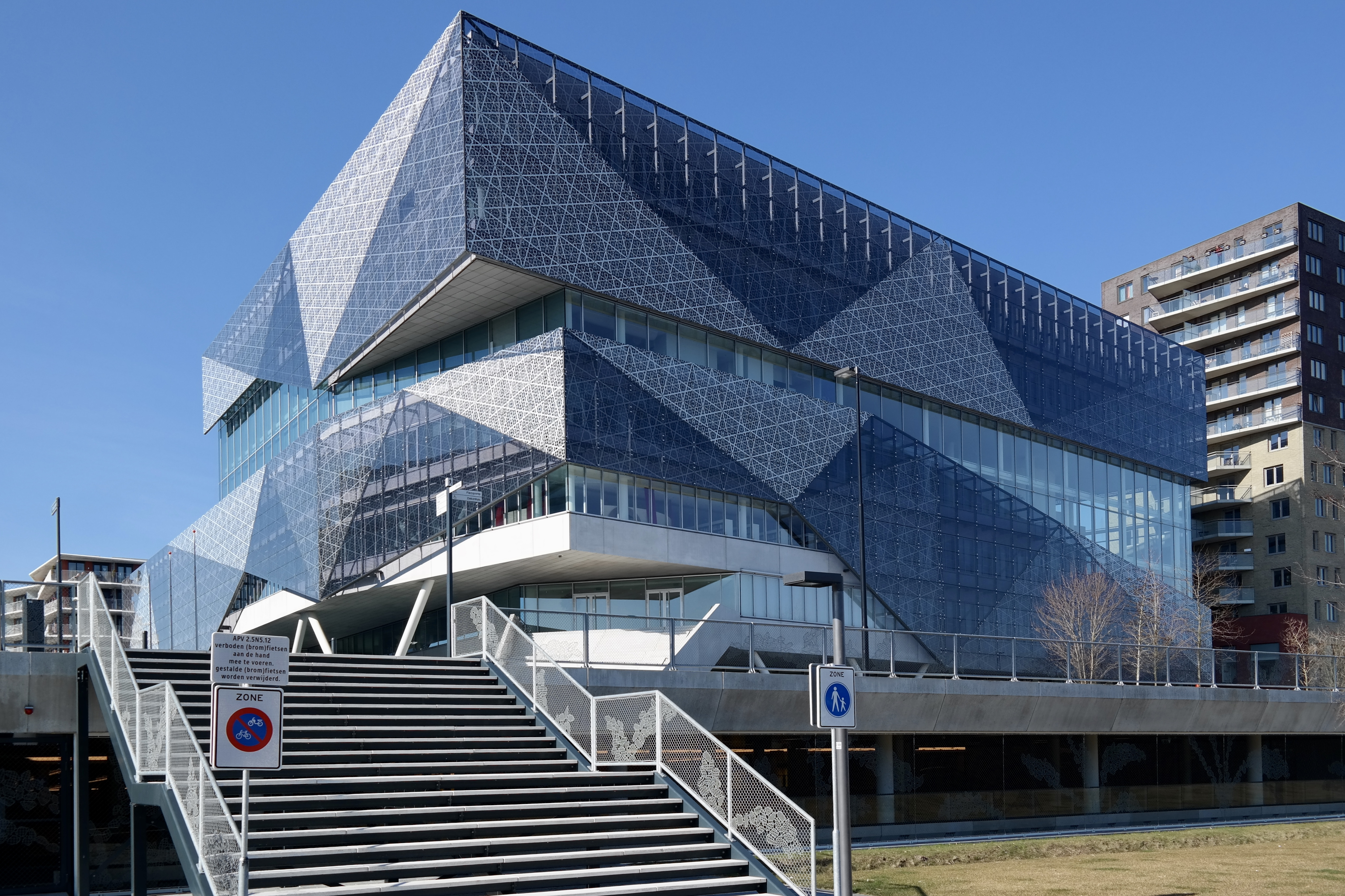
The modern city hall dsigned by Danish architectural firm 3XN

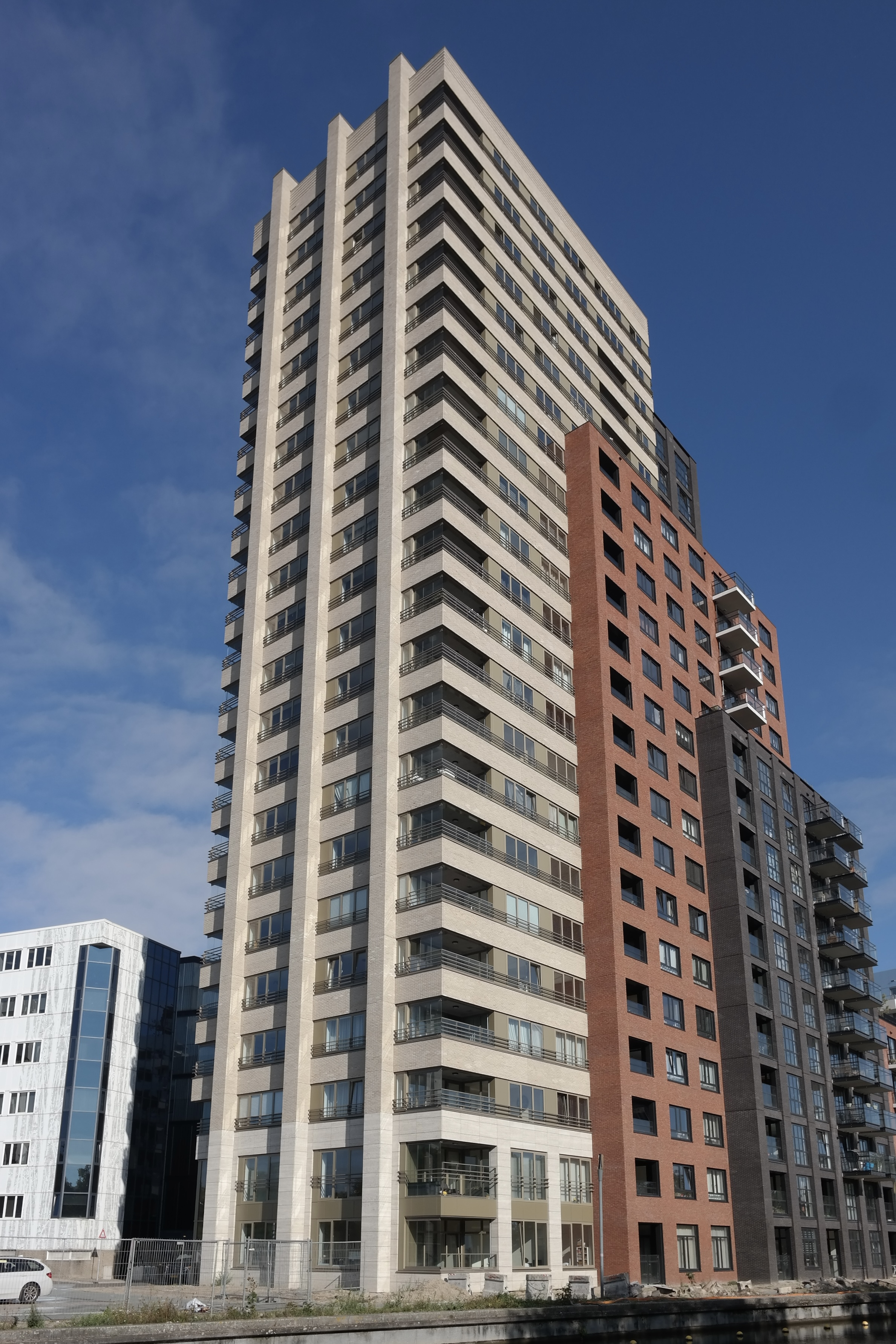
Vancouver, Nieuwegein's tallest building since 2025
