= Jutphaas =

- Former municipality
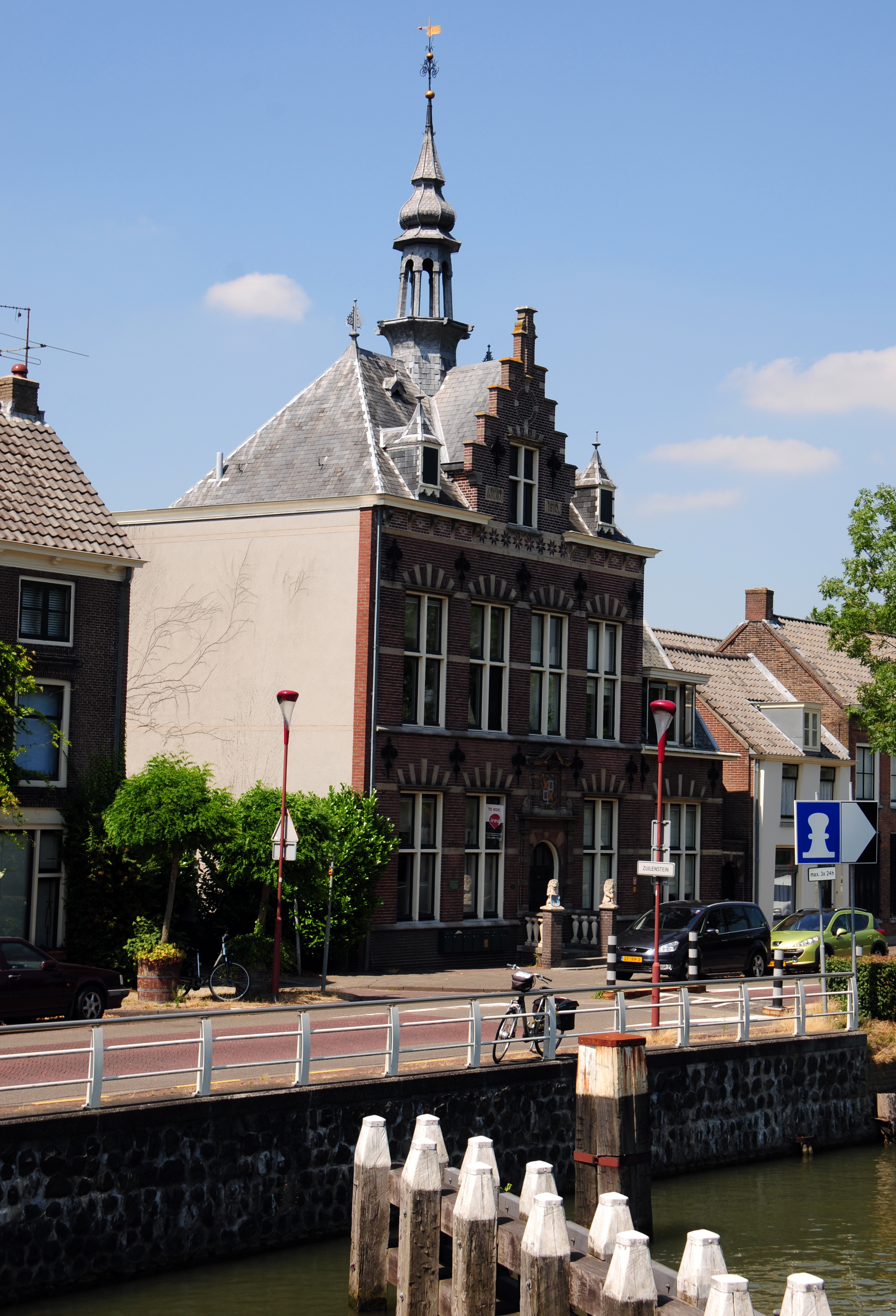
- Former town hall of Jutphaas

- Flag Coat of arms
- Interactive map of Jutphaas
- Coordinates: 52°2′16″N 5°5′38″E
- Country: Netherlands
- Province: Utrecht
- Municipality: Nieuwegein

Jutphaas is a former village and municipality in the province of Utrecht in the Netherlands. The municipality merged with Vreeswijk in 1971, and is now the northern half of the town of Nieuwegein.

The former village was located on the Merwedekanaal, and some of the buildings can still be found there, surrounded by the suburbs of Nieuwegein.
