= List of twin towns and sister cities in Germany =

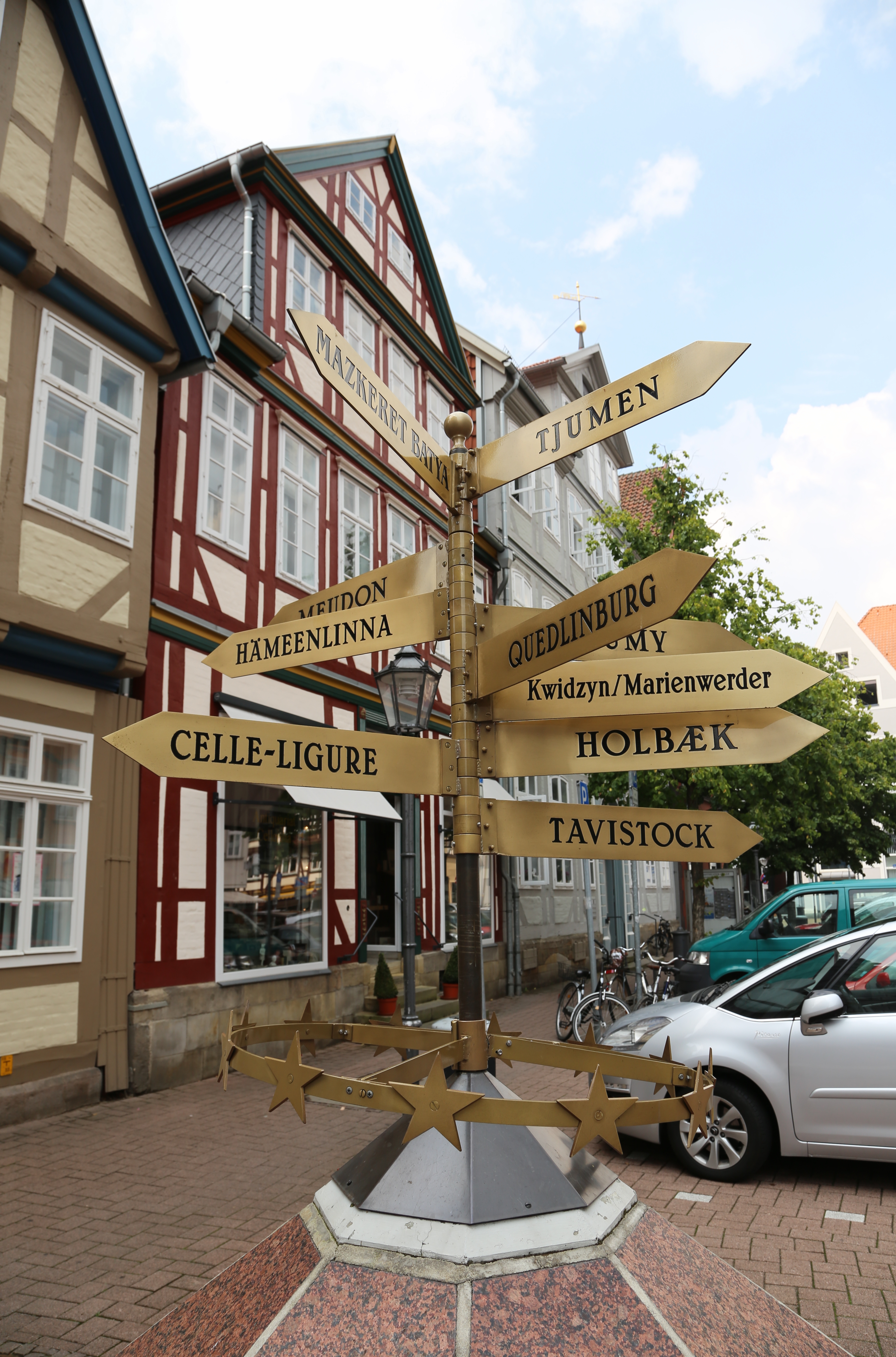
Signpost of twin towns in Celle

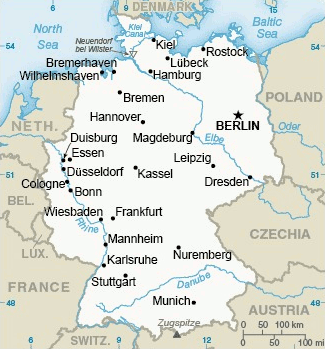
Map of Germany

This is a list of municipalities in Germany which have standing links to local communities in other countries, or in other parts of Germany (mostly across the former inner German border), known as "town twinning" (usually in Europe) or "sister cities" (usually in the rest of the world).

== A ==
Aachen

- Arlington County, United States
- Cape Town, South Africa
- Chernihiv, Ukraine
- Halifax, England, United Kingdom
- Montebourg, France
- Naumburg, Germany
- Ningbo, China
- Reims, France
- Sarıyer, Turkey
- Toledo, Spain

Aalen

- Antakya, Turkey
- Cervia, Italy
- Christchurch, England, United Kingdom
- Saint-Lô, France
- Tatabánya, Hungary

Achim

- Cēsis, Latvia
- Nowa Sól, Poland

Ahaus

- Argentré-du-Plessis, France

Ahlen

- Differdange, Luxembourg
- Penzberg, Germany
- Teltow, Germany
- Tempelhof-Schöneberg (Berlin), Germany

Ahrensburg

- Esplugues de Llobregat, Spain
- Feldkirchen in Kärnten, Austria
- Ludwigslust, Germany
- Viljandi, Estonia

Aichach

- Brixlegg, Austria
- Gödöllő, Hungary
- Schifferstadt, Germany

Albstadt

- Chambéry, France

Alsdorf

- Brunssum, Netherlands
- Hennigsdorf, Germany
- Saint-Brieuc, France

Altena

- Blackburn, England, United Kingdom
- Péronne, France
- Pinsk, Belarus

Altenburg

- Offenburg, Germany
- Olten, Switzerland
- Zlín, Czech Republic

Altötting

- Loreto, Italy
- Mariazell, Austria
- Ourém, Portugal

Amberg

- Bad Bergzabern, Germany
- Bystrzyca Kłodzka, Poland
- Desenzano del Garda, Italy
- Périgueux, France
- Trikala, Greece
- Ústí nad Orlicí, Czech Republic

Andernach

- Dimona, Israel
- Ekeren (Antwerp), Belgium
- Farnham, England, United Kingdom
- Saint-Amand-les-Eaux, France
- Stockerau, Austria
- Zella-Mehlis, Germany

Annaberg-Buchholz

- Chomutov, Czech Republic
- Paide, Estonia
- Weiden in der Oberpfalz, Germany

Ansbach

- Anglet, France
- Bay City, United States
- Fermo, Italy
- Jingjiang, China

Apolda

- Mark, Sweden
- Rapid City, United States
- San Miniato, Italy
- Seclin, France

Arnsberg

- Alba Iulia, Romania
- Bexley, England, United Kingdom
- Caltagirone, Italy
- Deventer, Netherlands
- Olesno, Poland

Arnstadt

- Le Bouscat, France
- Dubí, Czech Republic
- Gurk, Austria
- Kassel, Germany

Aschaffenburg

- Miskolc, Hungary
- Perth, Scotland, United Kingdom
- Saint-Germain-en-Laye, France

Aschersleben

- Kerava, Finland
- Peine, Germany
- Trenčianske Teplice, Slovakia

Attendorn

- Rawicz, Poland

Aue-Bad Schlema

- Guingamp, France
- Kadaň, Czech Republic
- Solingen, Germany

Augsburg

- Amagasaki, Japan
- Bourges, France
- Dayton, United States
- Inverness, Scotland, United Kingdom
- Jinan, China
- Liberec, Czech Republic
- Nagahama, Japan

Aurich

- Appingedam, Netherlands

== B ==
=== Ba ===
Backnang

- Annonay, France
- Bácsalmás, Hungary
- Chelmsford, England, United Kingdom

Bad Gandersheim

- Rotselaar, Belgium
- Skegness, England, United Kingdom

Bad Hersfeld

- Bad Salzungen, Germany
- L'Haÿ-les-Roses, France
- Šumperk, Czech Republic

Bad Homburg vor der Höhe

- Cabourg, France
- Chur, Switzerland
- Dubrovnik, Croatia
- Exeter, England, United Kingdom
- Mariánské Lázně, Czech Republic
- Mayrhofen, Austria
- Mondorf-les-Bains, Luxembourg
- Petergof, Russia
- Terracina, Italy

Bad Honnef

- Berck, France
- Cadenabbia (Griante), Italy
- Ludvika, Sweden
- Wittichenau, Germany

Bad Kissingen

- Eisenstadt, Austria
- Massa, Italy
- Vernon, France

Bad Kötzting is a member of the Douzelage, a town twinning association of towns across the European Union.

- Agros, Cyprus
- Altea, Spain
- Asikkala, Finland
- Bellagio, Italy
- Bundoran, Ireland
- Chojna, Poland
- Granville, France
- Holstebro, Denmark
- Houffalize, Belgium
- Judenburg, Austria
- Kőszeg, Hungary
- Marsaskala, Malta
- Meerssen, Netherlands
- Niederanven, Luxembourg
- Oxelösund, Sweden
- Preveza, Greece
- Rokiškis, Lithuania
- Rovinj, Croatia
- Sesimbra, Portugal
- Sherborne, England, United Kingdom
- Sigulda, Latvia
- Siret, Romania
- Škofja Loka, Slovenia
- Sušice, Czech Republic
- Tryavna, Bulgaria
- Türi, Estonia
- Zvolen, Slovakia

Bad Kreuznach

- Bourg-en-Bresse, France
- Neuruppin, Germany

Bad Langensalza

- Oostkamp, Belgium
- Bad Nauheim, Germany

Bad Nauheim

- Bad Langensalza, Germany
- Buxton, England, United Kingdom
- Chaumont, France
- Oostkamp, Belgium

Bad Neuenahr-Ahrweiler

- Brasschaat, Belgium

Bad Oeynhausen

- Fismes, France
- Inowrocław, Poland

Bad Oldesloe

- Be'er Ya'akov, Israel
- Jifna, Palestine
- Kołobrzeg, Poland
- Olivet, France

Bad Rappenau

- Contrexéville, France
- Llandrindod Wells, Wales, United Kingdom

Bad Salzuflen

- Luckenwalde, Germany
- Millau, France

Bad Salzungen

- Bad Hersfeld, Germany
- Ishøj, Denmark
- Mezőkövesd, Hungary
- Strakonice, Czech Republic

Bad Segeberg

- Kiryat Motzkin, Israel
- Riihimäki, Finland
- Teterow, Germany
- Võru, Estonia
- Złocieniec, Poland

Bad Soden

- Franklin, United States
- Františkovy Lázně, Czech Republic
- Kitzbühel, Austria
- Rueil-Malmaison, France
- Yōrō, Japan

Bad Vilbel

- Brotterode-Trusetal, Germany
- Glossop, England, United Kingdom
- Moulins, France

Bad Wurzach

- Luxeuil-les-Bains, France
- Popielów, Poland
- St Helier, Jersey
- Wallingford, England, United Kingdom

Bad Zwischenahn

- Centerville, United States
- Gołuchów, Poland
- Izegem, Belgium

Baden-Baden

- Karlovy Vary, Czech Republic
- Menton, France
- Moncalieri, Italy
- Sochi, Russia
- Yalta, Ukraine

Baesweiler

- Montesson, France

Balingen

- Royan, France

Bamberg

- Bedford, England, United Kingdom
- Esztergom, Hungary
- Feldkirchen in Kärnten, Austria
- Prague 1 (Prague), Czech Republic
- Rodez, France
- Villach, Austria

Barsinghausen

- Brzeg Dolny, Poland
- Kovel, Ukraine
- Mont-Saint-Aignan, France
- Wurzen, Germany

Baunatal

- San Sebastián de los Reyes, Spain
- Sangerhausen, Germany
- Vire-Normandie, France
- Vrchlabí, Czech Republic

Bautzen

- Dreux, France
- Heidelberg, Germany
- Jablonec nad Nisou, Czech Republic
- Jelenia Góra, Poland
- Worms, Germany

Bayreuth

- Annecy, France
- Prague 6 (Prague), Czech Republic
- Rudolstadt, Germany
- La Spezia, Italy
- Tekirdağ, Turkey

=== Be ===
Beckum

- La Celle-Saint-Cloud, France
- Grodków, Poland
- Heringsdorf, Germany

Bensheim

- Amersham, England, United Kingdom
- Beaune, France
- Hostinné, Czech Republic
- Kłodzko, Poland
- Mohács, Hungary
- Riva del Garda, Italy

Bergheim

- Andenne, Belgium
- Chauny, France

Bergisch Gladbach

- Beit Jala, Palestine
- Bourgoin-Jallieu, France
- Bucha, Ukraine
- Ganei Tikva, Israel
- Joinville-le-Pont, France
- Limassol, Cyprus
- Luton, England, United Kingdom
- Marijampolė, Lithuania
- Pszczyna, Poland
- Runnymede, England, United Kingdom
- Velsen, Netherlands

Bergkamen

- Gennevilliers, France
- Hettstedt, Germany
- Silifke, Turkey
- Wieliczka, Poland

Berlin

- Beijing, China
- Brussels, Belgium
- Budapest, Hungary
- Buenos Aires, Argentina
- Istanbul, Turkey
- Jakarta, Indonesia
- Kyiv, Ukraine
- London, England, United Kingdom
- Los Angeles, United States
- Madrid, Spain
- Mexico City, Mexico
- Prague, Czech Republic
- Tashkent, Uzbekistan
- Tel Aviv, Israel
- Tokyo, Japan
- Warsaw, Poland
- Windhoek, Namibia

Berlin – Charlottenburg-Wilmersdorf

- Apeldoorn, Netherlands
- Bad Iburg, Germany
- Belváros-Lipótváros (Budapest), Hungary
- Forchheim (district), Germany
- Gagny, France
- Gladsaxe, Denmark
- Karmiel, Israel
- Kulmbach (district), Germany
- Lewisham, England, United Kingdom
- Linz, Austria
- Mannheim, Germany
- Marburg-Biedenkopf (district), Germany
- Międzyrzecz, Poland
- Minden, Germany
- Or Yehuda, Israel
- Pechersk (Kyiv), Ukraine
- Rheingau-Taunus (district), Germany
- Split, Croatia
- Sutton, England, United Kingdom
- Trento, Italy
- Waldeck-Frankenberg (district), Germany

Berlin – Friedrichshain-Kreuzberg

- Al-Malikiyah, Syria
- Bergstraße (district), Germany
- Ingelheim am Rhein, Germany
- Kadıköy, Turkey
- Kiryat Yam, Israel
- Limburg-Weilburg (district), Germany
- Porta Westfalica, Germany
- San Rafael del Sur, Nicaragua
- Szczecin, Poland
- Wiesbaden, Germany

Berlin – Lichtenberg

- Białołęka (Warsaw), Poland
- Hajnówka County, Poland
- Hoàn Kiếm (Hanoi), Vietnam
- Jurbarkas, Lithuania
- Kaliningrad Oblast, Russia
- KaMubukwana (Maputo), Mozambique
- Margareten (Vienna), Austria

Berlin – Marzahn-Hellersdorf

- Budapest XV (Budapest), Hungary
- Halton, England, United Kingdom
- Hoàng Mai (Hanoi), Vietnam
- Kastrychnitski (Minsk), Belarus
- Lauingen, Germany
- Tychy, Poland

Berlin – Mitte

- Beyoğlu, Turkey
- Bottrop, Germany
- Central AO (Moscow), Russia
- Chaoyang (Beijing), China
- Frogn, Norway
- Higashiōsaka, Japan
- Holon, Israel
- Kassel, Germany
- Petrogradsky (Saint Petersburg), Russia
- Schwalm-Eder (district), Germany
- Shinjuku (Tokyo), Japan
- Tourcoing, France
- Tsuwano, Japan

Berlin – Neukölln

- Anderlecht, Belgium
- Bat Yam, Israel
- Boulogne-Billancourt, France
- Çiğli, Turkey
- Cologne, Germany
- Hammersmith and Fulham, England, United Kingdom
- Leonberg, Germany
- Marino, Italy
- Pavlovsk, Russia
- Prague 5 (Prague), Czech Republic
- Pushkin, Russia
- Ústí nad Orlicí, Czech Republic
- Wetzlar, Germany
- Zaanstad, Netherlands

Berlin – Pankow

- Ashkelon, Israel
- Kołobrzeg, Poland
- Rivne, Ukraine

Berlin – Reinickendorf

- Antony, France
- Bad Steben, Germany
- Blomberg, Germany
- Greenwich, England, United Kingdom
- Kiryat Ata, Israel
- Melle, Germany
- Vogelsberg (district), Germany

Berlin – Spandau

- Ashdod, Israel
- Asnières-sur-Seine, France
- İznik, Turkey
- Luton, England, United Kingdom
- Nauen, Germany
- Siegen, Germany
- Siegen-Wittgenstein (district), Germany

Berlin – Steglitz-Zehlendorf

- Brøndby, Denmark
- Cassino, Italy
- Hagen, Germany
- Industrialnyi (Kharkiv), Ukraine
- Kazimierz Dolny, Poland
- Kiryat Bialik, Israel
- Königs Wusterhausen, Germany
- Lüchow-Dannenberg (district), Germany
- Nałęczów, Poland
- Nentershausen, Germany
- Poniatowa, Poland
- Rendsburg-Eckernförde (district), Germany
- Ronneby, Sweden
- Sderot, Israel
- Sochos, Greece
- Songpa (Seoul), South Korea
- Szilvásvárad, Hungary
- Westerwald (district), Germany
- Zugló (Budapest), Hungary

Berlin – Tempelhof-Schöneberg

- Ahlen, Germany
- Amstelveen, Netherlands
- Bad Kreuznach (district), Germany
- Barnet, England, United Kingdom
- Charenton-le-Pont, France
- Koszalin, Poland
- Levallois-Perret, France
- Mezitli, Turkey
- Nahariya, Israel
- Paderborn (district), Germany
- Penzberg, Germany
- Teltow-Fläming (district), Germany
- Werra-Meißner (district), Germany
- Wuppertal, Germany

Berlin – Treptow-Köpenick

- Albinea, Italy
- Cajamarca, Peru
- Cologne, Germany
- East Norriton Township, United States
- Izola, Slovenia
- Mokotów (Warsaw), Poland
- Mürzzuschlag, Austria
- Odernheim, Germany
- Olomouc, Czech Republic
- Subotica, Serbia
- Tepebaşı, Turkey
- Veszprém County, Hungary

Bernau bei Berlin

- Champigny-sur-Marne, France
- Meckenheim, Germany
- Skwierzyna, Poland

Bernburg

- Anderson, United States
- Chomutov, Czech Republic
- Fourmies, France
- Rheine, Germany
- Tarnowskie Góry, Poland

=== Bi–Bo ===
Biberach an der Riss

- Asti, Italy
- Świdnica, Poland
- Telavi, Georgia
- Tendring, England, United Kingdom
- Valence, France

Bielefeld

- Concarneau, France
- Estelí, Nicaragua
- Nahariya, Israel
- Rochdale, England, United Kingdom
- Rzeszów, Poland
- Veliky Novgorod, Russia

Bietigheim-Bissingen

- Kusatsu, Japan
- Overland Park, United States
- Sucy-en-Brie, France
- Surrey Heath, England, United Kingdom
- Szekszárd, Hungary

Bingen am Rhein

- Anamur, Turkey
- Hitchin, England, United Kingdom
- Kutná Hora, Czech Republic
- Nuits-Saint-Georges, France
- Prizren, Kosovo
- Venarey-les-Laumes, France

Bitterfeld-Wolfen

- Dzerzhinsk, Russia
- Kamienna Góra, Poland
- Marl, Germany
- Vierzon, France
- Villefontaine, France
- Witten, Germany

Blankenfelde-Mahlow

- Bad Ems, Germany
- Kretinga, Lithuania
- Tószeg, Hungary

Blieskastel

- Castellabate, Italy
- Le Creusot, France

Böblingen

- Alba, Italy
- Bergama, Turkey
- Glenrothes, Scotland, United Kingdom
- Krems an der Donau, Austria
- Pontoise, France
- Sittard-Geleen, Netherlands
- Sömmerda, Germany

Bocholt

- Aurillac, France
- Bocholt, Belgium
- Rossendale, England, United Kingdom

Bochum

- Białystok, Poland
- Donetsk, Ukraine
- Nordhausen, Germany
- Oviedo, Spain
- Sheffield, England, United Kingdom
- Tsukuba, Japan

Bonn

- Bukhara, Uzbekistan
- Cape Coast, Ghana
- Chengdu, China
- Minsk, Belarus
- La Paz, Bolivia
- Potsdam, Germany
- Tel Aviv, Israel
- Ulaanbaatar, Mongolia

Bonn – Bad Godesberg

- Frascati, Italy
- Kortrijk, Belgium
- Saint-Cloud, France
- Windsor and Maidenhead, England, United Kingdom

Bonn – Beuel

- Mirecourt, France

Bonn – Bonn

- Budafok-Tétény (Budapest), Hungary
- Oxford, England, United Kingdom

Bonn – Hardtberg

- Villemomble, France

Borken

- Albertslund, Denmark
- Bolków, Poland
- Grabow, Germany
- Říčany, Czech Republic
- Whitstable, England, United Kingdom

Bornheim

- Bornem, Belgium
- Mittweida, Germany
- Zawiercie, Poland

Bottrop

- Blackpool, England, United Kingdom
- Gliwice, Poland
- Merseburg, Germany
- Mitte (Berlin), Germany
- Tourcoing, France
- Veszprém, Hungary

=== Br–Bu ===
Bramsche

- Biskupiec, Poland
- Harfleur, France
- Ra'anana, Israel
- Todmorden, England, United Kingdom

Brandenburg an der Havel

- Ballerup, Denmark
- Ivry-sur-Seine, France
- Kaiserslautern, Germany
- Magnitogorsk, Russia

Braunschweig

- Bandung, Indonesia
- Bath, England, United Kingdom
- Kazan, Russia
- Kiryat Tiv'on, Israel
- Magdeburg, Germany
- Nîmes, France
- Omaha, United States
- Sousse, Tunisia
- Zhuhai, China

Bremen

- Bratislava, Slovakia
- Corinto, Nicaragua
- Dalian, China
- Durban, South Africa
- Gdańsk, Poland
- Haifa, Israel
- İzmir, Turkey
- Riga, Latvia
- Rostock, Germany

Bremerhaven

- Cherbourg-en-Cotentin, France
- Frederikshavn, Denmark
- Kaliningrad, Russia
- North East Lincolnshire, England, United Kingdom
- Pori, Finland
- Szczecin, Poland

Bretten

- Condeixa-a-Nova, Portugal
- Hemer, Germany
- Hidas, Hungary
- Longjumeau, France
- Nemesnádudvar, Hungary
- Neuflize, France
- Pontypool, Wales, United Kingdom
- Valserhône, France
- Wittenberg, Germany

Brilon

- Buckow, Germany
- Hesdin, France
- Heusden-Zolder, Belgium
- Thurso, Scotland, United Kingdom

Bruchsal

- Cwmbran, Wales, United Kingdom
- Gornja Radgona, Slovenia
- Sainte-Marie-aux-Mines, France
- Sainte-Menehould, France
- Volterra, Italy

Brühl

- Chalcis, Greece
- Kaş, Turkey
- Kunice, Poland
- Royal Leamington Spa, England, United Kingdom
- Sceaux, France
- Weißwasser, Germany

Buchholz in der Nordheide

- Canteleu, France
- Järvenpää, Finland
- Wołów, Poland

Büdingen

- Bruntál, Czech Republic
- Gistel, Belgium
- Herzberg, Germany
- Loudéac, France
- Sebeș, Romania
- Tinley Park, United States

Bühl

- Călărași District, Moldova
- Mattsee, Austria
- Mommenheim, France
- Schkeuditz, Germany
- Vilafranca del Penedès, Spain
- Villefranche-sur-Saône, France

Bünde

- Jakobstad, Finland
- Leisnig, Germany

Büren

- Charenton-le-Pont, France
- Ignalina, Lithuania
- Kortemark, Belgium
- Mittersill, Austria

Burg

- Afantou, Greece
- Gummersbach, Germany
- La Roche-sur-Yon, France
- Tira, Israel

Burgdorf

- Burgdorf, Switzerland
- Calbe, Germany

Butzbach

- Collecchio, Italy
- Eilenburg, Germany
- Saint-Cyr-l'École, France

Buxtehude

- Blagnac, France
- Ribnitz-Damgarten, Germany

== C ==
Castrop-Rauxel

- Kuopio, Finland
- Nowa Ruda, Poland
- Trikala, Greece
- Vincennes, France
- Wakefield, England, United Kingdom
- Zehdenick, Germany
- Zonguldak, Turkey

Celle

- Celle Ligure, Italy
- Hämeenlinna, Finland
- Holbæk, Denmark
- Kwidzyn, Poland
- Meudon, France
- Mazkeret Batya, Israel
- Sumy, Ukraine
- Tavistock, England, United Kingdom
- Tulsa, United States
- Tyumen, Russia

Chemnitz

- Akron, United States
- Arras, France
- Düsseldorf, Germany
- Ljubljana, Slovenia
- Łódź, Poland
- Manchester, England, United Kingdom
- Mulhouse, France
- Taiyuan, China
- Tampere, Finland
- Timbuktu, Mali
- Ústí nad Labem, Czech Republic
- Volgograd, Russia

Cloppenburg

- Bernay, France

Coburg

- Cobourg, Canada
- Gais, Italy
- Isle of Wight, England, United Kingdom
- Niort, France
- Oudenaarde, Belgium
- Toledo, United States

Coesfeld

- De Bilt, Netherlands
- Plerguer, France

Cologne

- Barcelona, Spain
- Beijing, China
- Bethlehem, Palestine
- Cluj-Napoca, Romania
- Corinto, Nicaragua
- Cork, Ireland
- Dnipro, Ukraine
- Esch-sur-Alzette, Luxembourg
- Indianapolis, United States
- Istanbul, Turkey
- Katowice, Poland
- Kyoto, Japan
- Liège, Belgium
- Lille, France
- Liverpool, England, United Kingdom
- Neukölln (Berlin), Germany
- El Realejo, Nicaragua
- Rio de Janeiro, Brazil
- Rotterdam, Netherlands
- Tel Aviv, Israel
- Thessaloniki, Greece
- Treptow-Köpenick (Berlin), Germany
- Tunis, Tunisia
- Turin, Italy
- Turku, Finland
- Volgograd, Russia

Coswig

- Lovosice, Czech Republic
- Ravensburg, Germany

Cottbus

- Gelsenkirchen, Germany
- Grosseto, Italy
- Košice, Slovakia
- Lipetsk, Russia
- Montreuil, France
- Nuneaton and Bedworth, England, United Kingdom
- Saarbrücken, Germany
- Targovishte, Bulgaria
- Zielona Góra, Poland

Crailsheim

- Biłgoraj, Poland
- Jurbarkas, Lithuania
- Pamiers, France
- Worthington, United States

Crimmitschau

- Bystřice nad Pernštejnem, Czech Republic
- Wiehl, Germany

Cuxhaven

- Binz, Germany
- Hafnarfjörður, Iceland
- Penzance, England, United Kingdom
- Sassnitz, Germany
- Vannes, France

== D ==
Dachau

- Fondi, Italy
- Klagenfurt, Austria

Darmstadt

- Alkmaar, Netherlands
- Brescia, Italy
- Bursa, Turkey
- Chesterfield, England, United Kingdom
- Freiberg, Germany
- Graz, Austria
- Gstaad (Saanen), Switzerland
- Gyönk, Hungary
- Liepāja, Latvia
- Logroño, Spain
- Płock, Poland
- San Antonio, United States
- Szeged, Hungary
- Trondheim, Norway
- Troyes, France
- Uzhhorod, Ukraine

Datteln

- Cannock Chase, England, United Kingdom
- Genthin, Germany

Deggendorf

- Neusiedl am See, Austria
- Písek, Czech Republic

Delbrück

- Budakeszi, Hungary
- Quérénaing, France
- Zossen, Germany

Delitzsch

- Friedrichshafen, Germany
- Monheim am Rhein, Germany
- Ostrów Wielkopolski, Poland

Delmenhorst

- Allonnes, France
- Borisoglebsk, Russia
- Eberswalde, Germany
- Kolding, Denmark
- Lublin, Poland

Dessau-Roßlau

- Argenteuil, France
- Gliwice, Poland
- Ibbenbüren, Germany
- Klagenfurt, Austria
- Ludwigshafen, Germany
- Roudnice nad Labem, Czech Republic
- Vilnius District Municipality, Lithuania

Detmold

- Hasselt, Belgium
- Oraiokastro, Greece
- Saint-Omer, France
- Savonlinna, Finland
- Zeitz, Germany

Dieburg

- Aubergenville, France
- Mladá Boleslav, Czech Republic
- Reinsdorf, Germany

Dillenburg

- Breda, Netherlands
- Diest, Belgium
- Hereford, England, United Kingdom
- Orange, France

Dinslaken

- Agen, France
- Arad, Israel

Dietzenbach

- Kastsyukovichy, Belarus
- Kunming, China
- Masaya, Nicaragua
- Neuhaus am Rennweg, Germany
- Oconomowoc, United States
- Rakovník, Czech Republic
- Vélizy-Villacoublay, France

Ditzingen

- Gyula, Hungary
- Rillieux-la-Pape, France

Döbeln

- Givors, France
- Heidenheim an der Brenz, Germany
- Unna, Germany
- Vyškov, Czech Republic

Donaueschingen

- Kaminoyama, Japan
- Saverne, France
- Vác, Hungary

Dormagen

- Kiryat Ono, Israel
- Saint-André-lez-Lille, France
- Toro, Spain

Dorsten

- Antrim and Newtownabbey, Northern Ireland, United Kingdom
- Crawley, England, United Kingdom
- Dormans, France
- Ernée, France
- Hainichen, Germany
- Hod HaSharon, Israel
- Rybnik, Poland
- Waslala, Nicaragua

Dortmund

- Amiens, France
- Buffalo, United States
- Kumasi, Ghana
- Leeds, England, United Kingdom
- Netanya, Israel
- Novi Sad, Serbia
- Rostov-on-Don, Russia
- Trabzon, Turkey
- Xi'an, China
- Zhytomyr, Ukraine
- Zwickau, Germany

Dreieich

- Joinville, France
- Lansingerland, Netherlands
- Oisterwijk, Netherlands
- La Porte-du-Der, France
- Stafford, England, United Kingdom

Dresden

- Brazzaville, Congo
- Columbus, United States
- Coventry, England, United Kingdom
- Florence, Italy
- Hamburg, Germany
- Hangzhou, China
- Ostrava, Czech Republic
- Rotterdam, Netherlands
- Saint Petersburg, Russia
- Salzburg, Austria
- Skopje, North Macedonia
- Strasbourg, France
- Wrocław, Poland

Duisburg

- Calais, France
- Fort Lauderdale, United States
- Gaziantep, Turkey
- Lomé, Togo
- Perm, Russia
- Portsmouth, England, United Kingdom
- San Pedro Sula, Honduras
- Vilnius, Lithuania
- Wuhan, China

Dülmen

- Charleville-Mézières, France

Düren

- Altmünster, Austria
- Cormeilles, France
- Gradačac, Bosnia and Herzegovina
- Jinhua, China
- Karadeniz Ereğli, Turkey
- Stryi, Ukraine
- Valenciennes, France

Düsseldorf

- Chemnitz, Germany
- Chernivtsi, Ukraine
- Chiba Prefecture, Japan
- Chongqing, China
- Haifa, Israel
- Palermo, Italy
- Reading, England, United Kingdom
- Warsaw, Poland

== E ==
Eberswalde

- Delmenhorst, Germany
- Gorzów Wielkopolski, Poland
- Herlev, Denmark

Eckernförde

- Bützow, Germany
- Hässleholm, Sweden
- Tanga, Tanzania

Ehingen

- Esztergom, Hungary

Einbeck

- Artern, Germany
- Keene, United States
- Paczków, Poland
- Thiais, France
- Wieselburg, Austria

Eisenach

- Marburg, Germany
- Mogilev, Belarus
- Sárospatak, Hungary
- Sedan, France
- Skanderborg, Denmark
- Waverly, United States

Eisenhüttenstadt

- Dimitrovgrad, Bulgaria
- Drancy, France
- Głogów, Poland
- Saarlouis, Germany

Eisleben

- Herne, Germany
- Memmingen, Germany
- Raismes, France
- Weinheim, Germany

Elmshorn

- Raisio, Finland
- Stargard, Poland
- Tarascon, France
- Wittenberge, Germany

Emden

- Arkhangelsk, Russia
- Haugesund, Norway

Emmendingen

- Newark-on-Trent, England, United Kingdom
- Sandomierz, Poland
- Six-Fours-les-Plages, France

Emmerich am Rhein

- King's Lynn, England, United Kingdom
- Šilutė, Lithuania

Emsdetten

- Chojnice, Poland
- Hengelo, Netherlands

Ennepetal

- Vilvoorde, Belgium

Erding

- Bastia, France

Erftstadt

- Jelenia Góra, Poland
- Viry-Châtillon, France
- Wokingham, England, United Kingdom

Erfurt

- Győr, Hungary
- Haifa, Israel
- Kalisz, Poland
- Kati, Mali
- Lille, France
- Lovech, Bulgaria
- Mainz, Germany
- San Miguel de Tucumán, Argentina
- Shawnee, United States
- Vilnius, Lithuania
- Xuzhou, China

Erkelenz

- Bad Windsheim, Germany
- Saint-James, France

Erkrath

- West Lancashire, England, United Kingdom

Erlangen

- Beşiktaş, Turkey
- Bolzano, Italy
- Eskilstuna, Sweden
- Jena, Germany
- Rennes, France
- Riverside, United States
- San Carlos, Nicaragua
- Stoke-on-Trent, England, United Kingdom
- Umhausen, Austria
- Vladimir, Russia

Eschweiler

- Reigate and Banstead, England, United Kingdom
- Sulzbach-Rosenberg, Germany
- Wattrelos, France

Espelkamp

- Angermünde, Germany
- Borås, Sweden
- Nagykőrös, Hungary
- Torgelow, Germany

Essen

- Changzhou, China
- Grenoble, France
- Nizhny Novgorod, Russia
- Sunderland, England, United Kingdom
- Tampere, Finland
- Tel Aviv, Israel
- Zabrze, Poland

Esslingen am Neckar

- Coimbatore, India
- Eger, Hungary
- Kamianets-Podilskyi, Ukraine
- Maladzyechna, Belarus
- Neath Port Talbot, Wales, United Kingdom
- Norrköping, Sweden
- Piotrków Trybunalski, Poland
- Schiedam, Netherlands
- Sheboygan, United States
- Udine, Italy
- Velenje, Slovenia
- Vienne, France

Ettlingen

- Clevedon, England, United Kingdom
- Épernay, France
- Gatchina, Russia
- Löbau, Germany
- Menfi, Italy
- Middelkerke, Belgium

Euskirchen

- Basingstoke and Deane, England, United Kingdom
- Charleville-Mézières, France

Eutin

- Guldborgsund, Denmark
- Lawrence, United States
- Putbus, Germany

== F ==
Fellbach

- Erba, Italy
- Meissen, Germany
- Pécs, Hungary
- Tain-l'Hermitage, France
- Tournon-sur-Rhône, France

Filderstadt

- Dombasle-sur-Meurthe, France
- Oschatz, Germany
- Poltava, Ukraine
- Selby, England, United Kingdom
- La Souterraine, France

Flensburg

- Carlisle, England, United Kingdom
- Neubrandenburg, Germany
- Słupsk, Poland

Forchheim

- Broumov, Czech Republic
- Gherla, Romania
- Le Perreux-sur-Marne, France
- Pößneck, Germany
- Roppen, Austria
- Rovereto, Italy

Frankenthal

- Colombes, France
- Rosolini, Italy
- Sopot, Poland
- Strausberg, Germany

Frankfurt am Main

- Birmingham, England, United Kingdom
- Budapest, Hungary
- Deuil-la-Barre, France
- Dubai, United Arab Emirates
- Eskişehir, Turkey
- Granada, Nicaragua
- Guangzhou, China
- Kraków, Poland
- Leipzig, Germany
- Lyon, France
- Milan, Italy
- Philadelphia, United States
- Prague, Czech Republic
- Tel Aviv, Israel
- Toronto, Canada

Frankfurt an der Oder

- Gorzów Wielkopolski, Poland
- Heilbronn, Germany
- Kadima-Zoran, Israel
- Nîmes, France
- Słubice, Poland
- Vantaa, Finland
- Vitebsk, Belarus
- Vratsa, Bulgaria
- Yuma, United States

Frechen

- Kapfenberg, Austria

Freiberg

- Clausthal-Zellerfeld, Germany
- Darmstadt, Germany
- Delft, Netherlands
- Gentilly, France
- Ness Ziona, Israel
- Příbram, Czech Republic
- Wałbrzych, Poland

Freiburg im Breisgau

- Besançon, France
- Granada, Spain
- Guildford, England, United Kingdom
- Innsbruck, Austria
- Isfahan, Iran
- Lviv, Ukraine
- Madison, United States
- Matsuyama, Japan
- Padua, Italy
- Suwon, South Korea
- Tel Aviv, Israel
- Wiwilí de Jinotega, Nicaragua

Freising

- Arpajon, France
- Innichen, Italy
- Maria Wörth, Austria
- Obervellach, Austria
- Škofja Loka, Slovenia
- Waidhofen an der Ybbs, Austria

Freudenstadt

- Courbevoie, France
- Männedorf, Switzerland
- Sandanski, Bulgaria

Friedberg, Bavaria

- Bressuire, France
- Chippenham, England, United Kingdom
- Friedberg, Austria
- La Crosse, United States
- Völs am Schlern, Italy

Friedberg, Hesse

- Entroncamento, Portugal
- Magreglio, Italy
- Villiers-sur-Marne, France

Friedrichsdorf

- Bad Wimsbach-Neydharting, Austria
- Chesham, England, United Kingdom
- Houilles, France

Friedrichshafen

- Delitzsch, Germany
- Imperia, Italy
- Peoria, United States
- Polotsk, Belarus
- Saint-Dié-des-Vosges, France
- Sarajevo, Bosnia and Herzegovina

Fulda

- Arles, France
- Como, Italy
- Dokkum (Noardeast-Fryslân), Netherlands
- Litoměřice, Czech Republic
- Sergiyev Posad, Russia
- Wilmington, United States

Fürstenfeldbruck

- Almuñécar, Spain
- Cerveteri, Italy
- Livry-Gargan, France
- Wichita Falls, United States
- Zadar, Croatia

Fürstenwalde

- Choszczno, Poland
- Reinheim, Germany
- Sulechów, Poland

Fürth

- Limoges, France
- Marmaris, Turkey
- Paisley, Scotland, United Kingdom
- Xylokastro, Greece

== G ==
=== Ga–Ge ===
Gaggenau

- Annemasse, France
- Sieradz, Poland

Ganderkesee

- Montval-sur-Loir, France
- Pułtusk, Poland

Garbsen

- Bassetlaw, England, United Kingdom
- Farmers Branch, United States
- Hérouville-Saint-Clair, France
- Schönebeck, Germany
- Września, Poland

Gardelegen

- Darłowo, Poland
- Gifhorn, Germany
- Waltrop, Germany

Garmisch-Partenkirchen

- Aspen, United States
- Chamonix-Mont-Blanc, France
- Lahti, Finland

Geesthacht

- Kuldīga, Latvia
- Midden-Groningen, Netherlands
- Plaisir, France

Geestland

- Tozeur, Tunisia

Geilenkirchen

- Quimperlé, France

Geldern

- Bree, Belgium
- Fürstenberg, Germany

Gelsenkirchen

- Büyükçekmece, Turkey
- Cottbus, Germany
- Newcastle upon Tyne, England, United Kingdom
- Olsztyn, Poland
- Shakhty, Russia
- Zenica, Bosnia and Herzegovina

Georgsmarienhütte

- Emmen, Netherlands
- Kłodzko (rural gmina), Poland
- Ramat HaSharon, Israel

Gera

- Arnhem, Netherlands
- Fort Wayne, United States
- Goražde, Bosnia and Herzegovina
- Kuopio, Finland
- Pskov, Russia
- Rostov-on-Don, Russia
- Saint-Denis, France
- Skierniewice, Poland
- Sliven, Bulgaria
- Timișoara, Romania

Geretsried

- Chamalières, France

Germering

- Balatonfüred, Hungary
- Domont, France

Gevelsberg

- Butera, Italy
- Szprotawa, Poland
- Vendôme, France

=== Gi–Gu ===
Giessen

- Ferrara, Italy
- Gödöllő, Hungary
- Hradec Králové, Czech Republic
- Netanya, Israel
- San Juan del Sur, Nicaragua
- Waterloo, United States
- Winchester, England, United Kingdom
- Wenzhou, China

Gifhorn

- Dumfries, Scotland, United Kingdom
- Gardelegen, Germany
- Hallsberg, Sweden
- Korsun-Shevchenkivskyi, Ukraine
- Xanthi, Greece

Gladbeck

- Alanya, Turkey
- Enfield, England, United Kingdom
- Fushun, China
- Marcq-en-Barœul, France
- Schwechat, Austria
- Wodzisław Śląski, Poland

Glauchau

- Grenay, France
- Iserlohn, Germany
- Jibou, Romania
- Lynchburg, United States
- Vermelles, France
- Zgierz, Poland

Goch

- Andover, England, United Kingdom
- Meierijstad, Netherlands
- Nowy Tomyśl, Poland
- Redon, France

Göppingen

- Foggia, Italy
- Klosterneuburg, Austria
- Pessac, France
- Sonneberg, Germany

Görlitz

- Amiens, France
- Molfetta, Italy
- Nový Jičín, Czech Republic
- Wiesbaden, Germany
- Zgorzelec, Poland

Goslar

- Arcachon, France
- Beroun, Czech Republic
- Brzeg, Poland
- Forres, Scotland, United Kingdom
- Ra'anana, Israel
- Windsor and Maidenhead, England, United Kingdom

Gotha

- Adwa, Ethiopia
- Gastonia, United States
- Kielce, Poland
- Martin, Slovakia
- Romilly-sur-Seine, France
- Salzgitter, Germany

Göttingen

- Cheltenham, England, United Kingdom
- Pau, France
- Toruń, Poland
- Wittenberg, Germany

Greifswald

- Goleniów, Poland
- Hamar, Norway
- Kotka, Finland
- Lund, Sweden
- Newport News, United States
- Osnabrück, Germany
- Szczecin, Poland

Greven

- Montargis, France

Grevenbroich

- Celje, Slovenia
- Peel en Maas, Netherlands
- Saint-Chamond, France

Griesheim

- Bar-le-Duc, France
- Gyönk, Hungary
- Pontassieve, Italy

Grimma

- Bron, France
- Gezer, Israel
- Leduc, Canada
- Rüdesheim, Germany
- Weingarten, Germany

Gronau

- Bromsgrove, England, United Kingdom
- Epe, Netherlands
- Mezőberény, Hungary

Groß-Gerau

- Brignoles, France
- Bruneck, Italy
- Szamotuły, Poland
- Tielt, Belgium

Gummersbach

- Afantou, Greece
- Burg, Germany
- La Roche-sur-Yon, France

Güstrow

- Esbjerg, Denmark
- Gryfice, Poland
- Kronshagen, Germany
- Neuwied, Germany

Gütersloh

- Broxtowe, England, United Kingdom
- Châteauroux, France
- Falun, Sweden
- Grudziądz, Poland
- Rzhev, Russia

== H ==
=== Ha ===
Haan

- Bad Lauchstädt, Germany
- Berwick-upon-Tweed, England, United Kingdom
- Dobrodzień, Poland
- Eu, France

Hagen

- Bruck an der Mur, Austria
- Liévin, France
- Modi'in-Maccabim-Re'ut, Israel
- Montluçon, France
- Smolensk, Russia
- Steglitz-Zehlendorf (Berlin), Germany

Halberstadt

- Banská Bystrica, Slovakia
- Náchod, Czech Republic
- Villars, France
- Wolfsburg, Germany

Halle (Saale)

- Grenoble, France
- Gyumri, Armenia
- Jiaxing, China
- Karlsruhe, Germany
- Linz, Austria
- Oulu, Finland
- Savannah, United States
- Ufa, Russia

Haltern am See

- Roost-Warendin, France
- Sankt Veit an der Glan, Austria

Hamburg

- Chicago, United States
- Dar es Salaam, Tanzania
- Dresden, Germany
- León, Nicaragua
- Marseille, France
- Osaka, Japan
- Prague, Czech Republic
- Saint Petersburg, Russia
- Shanghai, China

Hamelin

- Kalwaria Zebrzydowska, Poland
- Quedlinburg, Germany
- Saint-Maur-des-Fossés, France
- Torbay, England, United Kingdom

Hamm

- Afyonkarahisar, Turkey
- Bradford, England, United Kingdom
- Chattanooga, United States
- Kalisz, Poland
- Mazatlán, Mexico
- Neufchâteau, France
- Oranienburg, Germany
- Santa Monica, United States
- Toul, France

Hanau

- Conflans-Sainte-Honorine, France
- Dartford, England, United Kingdom
- Francheville, France
- Nilüfer, Turkey
- Taizhou, China
- Tottori, Japan
- Yaroslavl, Russia

Hann. Münden

- Chełmno, Poland
- Holon, Israel
- Suresnes, France

Hanover

- Blantyre, Malawi
- Bristol, England, United Kingdom
- Hiroshima, Japan
- Leipzig, Germany
- Perpignan, France
- Poznań, Poland
- Rouen, France

Hattersheim am Main

- Mosonmagyaróvár, Hungary
- Santa Catarina, Cape Verde
- Sarcelles, France

=== He ===
Hechingen

- Hódmezővásárhely, Hungary
- Joué-lès-Tours, France

Heidelberg

- Bautzen, Germany
- Cambridge, England, United Kingdom
- Hangzhou, China
- Kumamoto, Japan
- Montpellier, France
- Odesa, Ukraine
- Palo Alto, United States
- Rehovot, Israel
- Simferopol, Ukraine

Heidenheim an der Brenz

- Clichy, France
- Döbeln, Germany
- Jihlava, Czech Republic
- Newport, Wales, United Kingdom
- Sankt Pölten, Austria
- Sisak, Croatia

Heilbronn

- Béziers, France
- Solothurn, Switzerland
- Stockport, England, United Kingdom
- Frankfurt an der Oder, Germany
- Słubice, Poland
- Novorossiysk, Russia

Heiligenhaus

- Basildon, England, United Kingdom
- Mansfield, England, United Kingdom
- Meaux, France
- Zwönitz, Germany

Heinsberg

- Ozimek, Poland

Helmstedt

- Albuquerque, United States
- Chard, England, United Kingdom
- Fiuggi, Italy
- Haldensleben, Germany
- Orăştie, Romania
- Svietlahorsk, Belarus
- Vitré, France

Hemer

- Beuvry, France
- Bretten, Germany
- Doberlug-Kirchhain, Germany
- Obervellach, Austria
- Shchyolkovo, Russia
- Steenwerck, France

Hemmingen

- Murowana Goślina, Poland
- South Lanarkshire, Scotland, United Kingdom
- Yvetot, France

Hennef (Sieg)

- Banbury, England, United Kingdom
- Foley, United States
- Nowy Dwór Gdański, Poland
- Le Pecq, France

Hennigsdorf

- Alsdorf, Germany
- Choisy-le-Roi, France
- Kralupy nad Vltavou, Czech Republic
- Środa Wielkopolska, Poland

Henstedt-Ulzburg

- Maurepas, France
- Usedom, Germany
- Waterlooville, England, United Kingdom
- Wierzchowo, Poland

Heppenheim

- Le Chesnay, France
- Kaltern an der Weinstraße, Italy
- West Bend, United States

Herborn

- Guntersdorf, Austria
- Iława, Poland
- Pertuis, France
- Post Falls, United States
- Schönbach, Austria

Herford

- Fredericia, Denmark
- Hinckley, England, United Kingdom

Herne

- Altagracia, Nicaragua
- Belgorod, Russia
- Beşiktaş, Turkey
- Eisleben, Germany
- Hénin-Beaumont, France
- Konin, Poland
- Luzhou, China
- Moyogalpa, Nicaragua
- Wakefield, England, United Kingdom

Herrenberg

- Fidenza, Italy
- Tarare, France

Herten

- Arras, France
- Doncaster, England, United Kingdom
- Schneeberg, Germany
- Szczytno, Poland

Herzogenrath

- Bistrița, Romania
- Plérin, France

=== Hi–Hu ===
Hilden

- Nové Město nad Metují, Czech Republic
- Warrington, England, United Kingdom

Hildesheim

- Angoulême, France
- Gelendzhik, Russia
- Minya, Egypt
- North Somerset, England, United Kingdom
- Pavia, Italy
- Weston-super-Mare, England, United Kingdom

Hof

- Cheb, Czech Republic
- Joensuu, Finland
- Ogden, United States
- Plauen, Germany
- Villeneuve-la-Garenne, France

Hofheim am Taunus

- Buccino, Italy
- Chinon, France
- Pruszcz Gdański, Poland
- Tiverton, England, United Kingdom

Hohen Neuendorf

- Bergerac, France
- Fürstenau, Germany
- Janów Podlaski, Poland
- Müllheim, Germany

Homburg

- Albano Laziale, Italy
- La Baule-Escoublac, France
- Ilmenau, Germany

Höxter

- Corbie, France
- Sudbury, England, United Kingdom

Hoyerswerda

- Dillingen, Germany
- Huittinen, Finland
- Środa Wielkopolska, Poland
- Zlatopil, Ukraine

Hückelhoven

- Breteuil, France
- Hartlepool, England, United Kingdom

Hürth

- Argelès-sur-Mer, France
- Burhaniye, Turkey
- Kabarnet, Kenya
- Nissewaard, Netherlands
- Skawina, Poland
- Thetford, England, United Kingdom

== I ==
Ibbenbüren

- Dessau-Roßlau, Germany
- Gourdon, France
- Hellendoorn, Netherlands
- Jastrzębie-Zdrój, Poland
- Prievidza, Slovakia

Idar-Oberstein

- Achicourt, France
- Margate, England, United Kingdom
- Les Mureaux, France
- Sosnowiec, Poland
- Turnov, Czech Republic

Idstein

- Lana, Italy
- Şile, Turkey
- Uglich, Russia
- Zwijndrecht, Belgium

Ilmenau

- Blue Ash, United States
- Homburg, Germany
- Târgu Mureș, Romania
- Wetzlar, Germany

Ingelheim am Rhein

- Autun, France
- Friedrichshain-Kreuzberg (Berlin), Germany
- Limbach-Oberfrohna, Germany
- Nysa, Poland
- San Pietro in Cariano, Italy
- Stevenage, England, United Kingdom

Ingolstadt

- Carrara, Italy
- Central AO (Moscow), Russia
- Foshan, China
- Grasse, France
- Győr, Hungary
- Kirkcaldy, Scotland, United Kingdom
- Kragujevac, Serbia
- Manisa, Turkey
- Murska Sobota, Slovenia
- Opole, Poland

Iserlohn

- Almelo, Netherlands
- Auchel, France
- Biel/Bienne, Switzerland
- Chorzów, Poland
- Glauchau, Germany
- Hall in Tirol, Austria
- Laventie, France
- Novocherkassk, Russia
- Nyíregyháza, Hungary

Isernhagen

- Épinay-sous-Sénart, France
- Peacehaven, England, United Kingdom
- Suchy Las, Poland
- Tamási, Hungary

Isny im Allgäu

- Andrychów, Poland
- Flawil, Switzerland
- Port-Jérôme-sur-Seine, France
- Sotkamo, Finland
- Street, England, United Kingdom

Itzehoe

- Cirencester, England, United Kingdom
- La Couronne, France
- Pasłęk, Poland

== J ==
Jena

- Aubervilliers, France
- Beit Jala, Palestine
- Berkeley, United States
- Erlangen, Germany
- Lugoj, Romania
- Porto, Portugal
- San Marcos, Nicaragua

Jüchen

- Leers, France

Jülich

- Haubourdin, France
- Taicang, China

== K ==
=== Ka–Ke ===
Kaarst

- La Madeleine, France
- Perleberg, Germany

Kaiserslautern

- Banja Luka, Bosnia and Herzegovina
- Brandenburg an der Havel, Germany
- Bunkyō (Tokyo), Japan
- Columbia, United States
- Davenport, United States
- Douzy, France
- Guimarães, Portugal
- Newham, England, United Kingdom
- Pleven, Bulgaria
- Saint-Quentin, France

Kaltenkirchen

- Aabenraa, Denmark
- Kalisz Pomorski, Poland
- Putlitz, Germany

Kamen

- Ängelholm, Sweden
- Bandırma, Turkey
- Beeskow, Germany
- Eilat, Israel
- Montreuil-Juigné, France
- Sulęcin, Poland
- Unkel, Germany

Kamp-Lintfort

- Edremit, Turkey
- Żory, Poland

Karben

- Krnov, Czech Republic
- Luisenthal, Germany
- Ramonville-Saint-Agne, France
- Saint-Égrève, France

Karlsruhe

- Halle, Germany
- Krasnodar, Russia
- Nancy, France
- Nottingham, England, United Kingdom
- Timișoara, Romania
- Vinnytsia, Ukraine

Kassel

- Arnstadt, Germany
- Florence, Italy
- Kocaeli, Turkey
- Mitte (Berlin), Germany
- Mulhouse, France
- Ramat Gan, Israel
- Rovaniemi, Finland
- Västerås, Sweden
- Yaroslavl, Russia

Kaufbeuren

- Ferrara, Italy
- Jablonec nad Nisou, Czech Republic
- Szombathely, Hungary

Kehl

- Montmorency, France

Kelkheim (Taunus)

- High Wycombe, England, United Kingdom
- Saint-Fons, France

Kempen

- East Cambridgeshire, England, United Kingdom
- Orsay, France
- Wambrechies, France
- Werdau, Germany

Kempten

- Bad Dürkheim, Germany
- Quiberon, France
- Sligo, Ireland
- Sopron, Hungary
- Trento, Italy

Kerpen

- Oświęcim, Poland
- St. Vith, Belgium

Kevelaer

- Bury St Edmunds, England, United Kingdom

=== Ki–Ku ===
Kiel

- Aarhus, Denmark
- Antakya, Turkey
- Brest, France
- Coventry, England, United Kingdom
- Gdynia, Poland
- Kaliningrad, Russia
- Moshi Rural District, Tanzania
- Samsun, Turkey
- San Francisco, United States
- Sovetsk, Russia
- Stralsund, Germany
- Tallinn, Estonia
- Vaasa, Finland

Kirchheim unter Teck

- Bački Petrovac, Serbia
- Kalocsa, Hungary
- Rambouillet, France

Kitzingen

- Montevarchi, Italy
- Prades, France
- Trzebnica, Poland

Kleve

- Ameland, Netherlands
- Dogbo-Tota, Benin
- Fitchburg, United States
- Ronse, Belgium
- Worcester, England, United Kingdom

Koblenz

- Austin, United States
- Haringey, England, United Kingdom
- Nevers, France
- Norwich, England, United Kingdom
- Novara, Italy
- Petah Tikva, Israel
- Uman, Ukraine
- Varaždin, Croatia

Königs Wusterhausen

- Germantown, United States
- Hückeswagen, Germany
- Příbram, Czech Republic
- Steglitz-Zehlendorf (Berlin), Germany

Königsbrunn

- Rab, Croatia

Königswinter

- Cleethorpes, England, United Kingdom
- Cognac, France

Konstanz

- Fontainebleau, France
- Lodi, Italy
- Richmond upon Thames, England, United Kingdom
- Suzhou, China
- Tábor, Czech Republic

Korbach

- Avranches, France
- Waltershausen, Germany
- Pyrzyce, Poland
- Vysoké Mýto, Czech Republic

Kornwestheim

- Eastleigh, England, United Kingdom
- Kimry, Russia
- Villeneuve-Saint-Georges, France
- Weißenfels, Germany

Korschenbroich

- Carbonne, France

Köthen (Anhalt)

- Siemianowice Śląskie, Poland
- Wattrelos, France

Krefeld

- Charlotte, United States
- Dunkirk, France
- Kayseri, Turkey
- Leicester, England, United Kingdom
- Leiden, Netherlands
- Oder-Spree (district), Germany
- Ulyanovsk, Russia
- Venlo, Netherlands

Kreuztal

- Ferndorf, Austria
- Nauen, Germany

Kronach

- Hennebont, France
- Kiskunhalas, Hungary
- Rhodt unter Rietburg, Germany

Kulmbach

- Bursa, Turkey
- Kilmarnock, Scotland, United Kingdom
- Lugo, Italy
- Rust, Austria
- Saalfeld, Germany

== L ==
=== La ===
Laatzen

- Le Grand-Quevilly, France
- Gubin, Poland
- Waidhofen an der Ybbs, Austria

Lage

- Horsham, England, United Kingdom
- Sankt Johann im Pongau, Austria

Lahr

- Alajuela, Costa Rica
- Belleville, Canada
- Dole, France

Lampertheim

- Adria, Italy
- Dieulouard, France
- Ermont, France
- Maldegem, Belgium
- Świdnica (rural gmina), Poland

Landau in der Pfalz

- Haguenau, France
- Ribeauvillé, France
- Ruhango, Rwanda

Landsberg am Lech

- Bushey, England, United Kingdom
- Hudson, United States
- Rocca di Papa, Italy
- Saint-Laurent-du-Var, France
- Siófok, Hungary
- Waldheim, Germany

Landshut

- Compiègne, France
- Elgin, Scotland, United Kingdom
- Ried im Innkreis, Austria
- Schio, Italy
- Sibiu, Romania

Langen (Hessen)

- Aranda de Duero, Spain
- Long Eaton, England, United Kingdom
- Romorantin-Lanthenay, France
- Tarsus, Turkey

Langenfeld

- Ennis, Ireland
- Gostynin, Poland
- Montale, Italy
- Senlis, France

Langenhagen

- Głogów, Poland
- Novo Mesto, Slovenia
- Southwark, England, United Kingdom
- Stadl-Paura, Austria
- Le Trait, France

Langerwehe

- Exmouth, England, United Kingdom

Lauf an der Pegnitz

- Brive-la-Gaillarde, France
- Drama, Greece
- Nyköping, Sweden
- Tirschenreuth, Germany

=== Le ===
Leer

- Elbląg, Poland
- Trowbridge, England, United Kingdom

Lehrte

- Mönsterås, Sweden
- Staßfurt, Germany
- Trzcianka, Poland
- Vanves, France
- Ypres, Belgium

Leichlingen (Rheinland)

- Funchal, Portugal
- Henley-on-Thames, England, United Kingdom
- Marly-le-Roi, France

Leimen

- Castanheira de Pera, Portugal
- Cernay-lès-Reims, France
- Kunín, Czech Republic
- Mafra, Portugal
- Tigy, France
- Tinqueux, France

Leinfelden-Echterdingen

- Manosque, France
- Poltava, Ukraine
- Voghera, Italy
- York, United States

Leipzig

- Addis Ababa, Ethiopia
- Birmingham, England, United Kingdom
- Bologna, Italy
- Brno, Czech Republic
- Frankfurt am Main, Germany
- Hanover, Germany
- Herzliya, Israel
- Ho Chi Minh City, Vietnam
- Houston, United States
- Kraków, Poland
- Kyiv, Ukraine
- Lyon, France
- Nanjing, China
- Thessaloniki, Greece
- Travnik, Bosnia and Herzegovina
- Yerevan, Armenia

Lemgo

- Beverley, England, United Kingdom
- Stendal, Germany
- Vandœuvre-lès-Nancy, France

Lennestadt

- Otwock, Poland

Leonberg

- Bad Lobenstein, Germany
- Belfort, France
- Neukölln (Berlin), Germany
- Rovinj, Croatia

Leverkusen

- Bracknell, England, United Kingdom
- Chinandega, Nicaragua
- Delphi, Greece
- Ljubljana, Slovenia
- Nikopol, Ukraine
- Nof HaGalil, Israel
- Oulu, Finland
- Racibórz, Poland
- Schwedt, Germany
- Villeneuve d'Ascq, France
- Wuxi, China

=== Li–Lu ===
Lichtenfels

- Ariccia, Italy
- Cournon-d'Auvergne, France
- Prestwick, Scotland, United Kingdom
- Vandalia, United States

Limburg an der Lahn

- Lichfield, England, United Kingdom
- Oudenburg, Belgium
- Sainte-Foy-lès-Lyon, France

Lingen (Ems)

- Bielawa, Poland
- Burton upon Trent, England, United Kingdom
- Elbeuf, France
- Marienberg, Germany
- Salt, Spain

Lippstadt

- Uden, Netherlands

Lohmar

- Eppendorf, Germany
- Frouard, France
- Pompey, France
- Vila Verde, Portugal
- Żarów, Poland

Lohne

- Międzylesie, Poland
- Rixheim, France

Löhne

- Columbus, United States
- Condega, Nicaragua
- Mielec, Poland
- Röbel, Germany
- Spittal an der Drau, Austria

Lörrach

- Chester, England, United Kingdom
- Meerane, Germany
- Senigallia, Italy
- Sens, France
- Village-Neuf, France

Lübbecke

- Bad Liebenwerda, Germany
- Bayeux, France
- Dorchester, England, United Kingdom
- Tiszakécske, Hungary

Lübbenau

- Halluin, France
- Kočevje, Slovenia
- Nowogród Bobrzański, Poland
- Oer-Erkenschwick, Germany
- Pniewy, Poland
- Świdnica, Poland

Lübeck

- Gotland, Sweden
- Klaipėda, Lithuania
- Kotka, Finland
- La Rochelle, France
- Wismar, Germany

Lüdenscheid

- Brighouse, England, United Kingdom
- Den Helder, Netherlands
- Leuven, Belgium
- Myślenice, Poland
- Romilly-sur-Seine, France
- Taganrog, Russia

Lüdinghausen

- Nysa, Poland
- Taverny, France

Ludwigsburg

- Bergamo, Italy
- Caerphilly, Wales, United Kingdom
- Montbéliard, France
- Nový Jičín, Czech Republic
- St. Charles, United States
- Yevpatoria, Ukraine

Ludwigshafen am Rhein

- Antwerp, Belgium
- Dessau-Roßlau, Germany
- Gaziantep, Turkey
- Havering, England, United Kingdom
- Lorient, France
- Pasadena, United States
- Sumgait, Azerbaijan
- Zviahel, Ukraine

Lüneburg

- Clamart, France
- Ivrea, Italy
- Naruto, Japan
- Scunthorpe, England, United Kingdom
- Tartu, Estonia
- Viborg, Denmark

Lünen

- Bartın, Turkey
- Demmin, Germany
- Kamień Pomorski, Poland
- Panevėžys, Lithuania
- Salford, England, United Kingdom
- Zwolle, Netherlands

== M ==
=== Ma ===
Magdeburg

- Braunschweig, Germany
- Harbin, China
- Le Havre, France
- Nashville, United States
- Radom, Poland
- Sarajevo, Bosnia and Herzegovina
- Zaporizhzhia, Ukraine

Maintal

- Esztergom, Hungary
- Katerini, Greece
- Luisant, France
- Moosburg, Austria

Mainz

- Dijon, France
- Erfurt, Germany
- Haifa, Israel
- Louisville, United States
- Odesa, Ukraine
- Valencia, Spain
- Watford, England, United Kingdom
- Zagreb, Croatia

Mainz – Finthen

- Rodeneck, Italy

Mainz – Laubenheim

- Longchamp, France

Mannheim

- Bydgoszcz, Poland
- Charlottenburg-Wilmersdorf (Berlin), Germany
- Chernivtsi, Ukraine
- Chișinău, Moldova
- Haifa, Israel
- Klaipėda, Lithuania
- Qingdao, China
- Riesa, Germany
- Swansea, Wales, United Kingdom
- Toulon, France
- Windsor, Canada
- Zhenjiang, China

Marburg

- Eisenach, Germany
- Maribor, Slovenia
- Northampton, England, United Kingdom
- Poitiers, France
- Sfax, Tunisia
- Sibiu, Romania

Marienberg

- Bad Marienberg, Germany
- Dorog, Hungary
- Lingen, Germany
- Most, Czech Republic

Markkleeberg

- Boville Ernica, Italy
- Neusäß, Germany
- Pierre-Bénite, France
- Zărnești, Romania

Marl

- Bitterfeld-Wolfen, Germany
- Creil, France
- Herzliya, Israel
- Krosno, Poland
- Kuşadası, Turkey
- Pendle, England, United Kingdom
- Zalaegerszeg, Hungary

Mayen

- Godalming, England, United Kingdom
- Joigny, France
- Uherské Hradiště, Czech Republic

=== Me ===
Meerbusch

- Fouesnant, France
- Shijōnawate, Japan

Meissen

- Arita, Japan
- Corfu, Greece
- Fellbach, Germany
- Legnica, Poland
- Litoměřice, Czech Republic
- Provo, United States
- Vitry-sur-Seine, France

Melle

- Bad Dürrenberg, Germany
- Cires-lès-Mello, France
- Eecke, France
- Eiken, Switzerland
- Eke (Nazareth), Belgium
- Ghent, Belgium
- Jēkabpils, Latvia
- Melle, Belgium
- Melle, France
- Niğde, Turkey
- Reinickendorf (Berlin), Germany
- Torzhok, Russia

Memmingen

- Auch, France
- Chernihiv, Ukraine
- Eisleben, Germany
- Glendale, United States
- Karataş, Turkey
- Kiryat Shmona, Israel
- Litzelsdorf, Austria
- Teramo, Italy
- Teramo Province, Italy

Menden

- Aire-sur-la-Lys, France
- Ardres, France
- Braine-l'Alleud, Belgium
- Eisenberg, Germany
- Flintshire, Wales, United Kingdom
- Lestrem, France
- Locon, France
- Marœuil, France
- Plungė, Lithuania

Meppen

- Ostrołęka, Poland

Merseburg

- Bottrop, Germany
- Châtillon, France
- Genzano di Roma, Italy

Merzig

- Luckau, Germany
- Saint-Médard-en-Jalles, France

Meschede

- Cousolre, France
- Le Puy-en-Velay, France

Mettmann

- Laval, France

=== Mi–Mu ===
Minden

- Changzhou, China
- Charlottenburg-Wilmersdorf (Berlin), Germany
- Gagny, France
- Gladsaxe, Denmark
- Grodno, Belarus
- Sutton, England, United Kingdom
- Tangermünde, Germany

Mittweida

- Bornheim, Germany
- Česká Lípa, Czech Republic
- Gabrovo, Bulgaria
- Viersen, Germany

Moers

- Bapaume, France
- Knowsley, England, United Kingdom
- Maisons-Alfort, France
- Ramla, Israel
- Seelow, Germany
- Stazzema, Italy
- La Trinidad, Nicaragua

Mönchengladbach

- Bradford, England, United Kingdom
- North Tyneside, England, United Kingdom
- Roermond, Netherlands
- Roubaix, France
- Thurrock, England, United Kingdom
- Verviers, Belgium

Monheim am Rhein

- Ataşehir, Turkey
- Bourg-la-Reine, France
- Delitzsch, Germany
- Malbork, Poland
- Tirat Carmel, Israel
- Wiener Neustadt, Austria

Mörfelden-Walldorf

- Torre Pellice, Italy
- Vitrolles, France
- Wageningen, Netherlands

Mosbach

- Budapest II (Budapest), Hungary
- Château-Thierry, France
- Finike, Turkey
- Lymington, England, United Kingdom
- Rosolina, Italy

Mühlacker

- Bassano del Grappa, Italy
- Schmölln, Germany

Mühlhausen

- Eschwege, Germany
- Kronstadt, Russia
- Münster, Germany
- Saxonburg, United States
- Tourcoing, France

Mühlheim am Main

- Saint-Priest, France

Mülheim an der Ruhr

- Beykoz, Turkey
- Darlington, England, United Kingdom
- Kfar Saba, Israel
- Kouvola, Finland
- Opole, Poland
- Tours, France

Munich

- Beersheba, Israel
- Bordeaux, France
- Cincinnati, United States
- Edinburgh, Scotland, United Kingdom
- Harare, Zimbabwe
- Kyiv, Ukraine
- Sapporo, Japan
- Verona, Italy

Münster

- Enschede, Netherlands
- Fresno, United States
- Kristiansand, Norway
- Lublin, Poland
- Monastir, Tunisia
- Mühlhausen, Germany
- Orléans, France
- Rishon LeZion, Israel
- Ryazan, Russia
- York, England, United Kingdom

== N ==
Naumburg (Saale)

- Aachen, Germany
- Armavir, Armenia
- Nidda, Germany
- Les Ulis, France

Neckarsulm

- Bordighera, Italy
- Budakeszi, Hungary
- Carmaux, France
- Grenchen, Switzerland
- Zschopau, Germany

Nettetal

- Ełk, Poland
- Fenland, England, United Kingdom
- Rives-en-Seine, France

Neubrandenburg

- Collegno, Italy
- Flensburg, Germany
- Gladsaxe, Denmark
- Koszalin, Poland
- Nazareth, Israel
- Nevers, France
- Petrozavodsk, Russia
- Villejuif, France
- Yangzhou, China

Neuburg an der Donau

- Jeseník, Czech Republic
- Sète, France
- Velká Kraš, Czech Republic
- Vidnava, Czech Republic

Neukirchen-Vluyn

- Buckingham, England, United Kingdom
- Mouvaux, France
- Ustroń, Poland

Neumarkt in der Oberpfalz

- Issoire, France
- Mistelbach, Austria

Neumünster

- Gravesham, England, United Kingdom
- Koszalin, Poland
- Parchim, Germany

Neunkirchen

- Lübben, Germany
- Mantes-la-Ville, France
- Wolsztyn, Poland

Neuruppin

- Babimost, Poland
- Bad Kreuznach, Germany
- Certaldo, Italy
- Nymburk, Czech Republic

Neuss

- Châlons-en-Champagne, France
- Nevşehir, Turkey
- Pskov, Russia
- Rijeka, Croatia
- Saint Paul, United States

Neustadt am Rübenberge

- La Ferté Macé, France

Neustadt an der Weinstraße

- Echt-Susteren, Netherlands
- Lincoln, England, United Kingdom
- Mâcon, France
- Manchester, United States
- Quanzhou, China
- Wernigerode, Germany
- Yenişehir, Turkey

Neuwied

- Bromley, England, United Kingdom
- Drom HaSharon, Israel
- Güstrow, Germany
- Suqian, China

Neu-Isenburg

- Andrézieux-Bouthéon, France
- Bad Vöslau, Austria
- Chiusi, Italy
- Dacorum, England, United Kingdom
- Veauche, France
- Weida, Germany

Neu-Ulm

- Bois-Colombes, France
- Meiningen, Germany
- New Ulm, United States
- Trissino, Italy

Niederkassel

- Limassol, Cyprus
- Premnitz, Germany

Nienburg

- Bartoszyce, Poland
- Las Cruces, United States
- Nienburg, Germany
- Vitebsk, Belarus

Nordenham

- Peterlee, England, United Kingdom
- Saint-Étienne-du-Rouvray, France
- Świnoujście, Poland

Norderstedt

- Kohtla-Järve, Estonia
- Maromme, France
- Oadby and Wigston, England, United Kingdom
- Zwijndrecht, Netherlands

Nordhausen

- Beit Shemesh, Israel
- Bochum, Germany
- Charleville-Mézières, France
- Ostrów Wielkopolski, Poland

Nordhorn

- Coevorden, Netherlands
- Malbork, Poland
- Montivilliers, France
- Reichenbach im Vogtland, Germany
- Rieti, Italy

Nördlingen

- Markham, Canada
- Olomouc, Czech Republic
- Riom, France
- Wagga Wagga, Australia

Northeim

- Cherbourg-en-Cotentin, France
- Gallneukirchen, Austria
- Prudnik, Poland

Nuremberg

- Antalya, Turkey
- Atlanta, United States
- Brașov, Romania
- Córdoba, Spain
- Glasgow, Scotland, United Kingdom
- Hadera, Israel
- Kavala, Greece
- Kharkiv, Ukraine
- Kraków, Poland
- Nice, France
- Prague, Czech Republic
- San Carlos, Nicaragua
- Shenzhen, China
- Skopje, North Macedonia

Nürtingen

- Oullins, France
- Rhondda Cynon Taf, Wales, United Kingdom
- Soroksár (Budapest), Hungary
- Zerbst, Germany

== O ==
Oberhausen

- Carbonia, Italy
- Freital, Germany
- Iglesias, Italy
- Mersin, Turkey
- Middlesbrough, England, United Kingdom
- Zaporizhzhia, Ukraine

Obertshausen

- Laakirchen, Austria
- Meiningen, Germany
- Sainte-Geneviève-des-Bois, France

Oberursel (Taunus)

- Épinay-sur-Seine, France
- Koggenland, Netherlands
- Lomonosov, Russia
- Rushmoor, England, United Kingdom

Oer-Erkenschwick

- Alanya, Turkey
- Halluin, France
- Kočevje, Slovenia
- Lübbenau, Germany
- North Tyneside, England, United Kingdom
- Pniewy, Poland

Offenbach am Main

- Esch-sur-Alzette, Luxembourg
- Kawagoe, Japan
- Mödling, Austria
- Nahariya, Israel
- Oryol, Russia
- Puteaux, France
- Rivas, Nicaragua
- Saint-Gilles, Belgium
- Tower Hamlets, England, United Kingdom
- Velletri, Italy
- Yangzhou, China
- Zemun (Belgrade), Serbia

Offenburg

- Altenburg, Germany
- Elstree and Borehamwood, England, United Kingdom
- Lons-le-Saunier, France
- Olsztyn, Poland
- Pietra Ligure, Italy
- Weiz, Austria

Öhringen

- Großenhain, Germany
- Kędzierzyn-Koźle, Poland
- Treffen am Ossiacher See, Austria

Olching

- Feurs, France
- Tuchola, Poland

Oldenburg

- Buffalo City, South Africa
- Cholet, France
- Groningen, Netherlands
- Høje-Taastrup, Denmark
- Kingston upon Thames, England, United Kingdom
- Makhachkala, Russia
- Mateh Asher, Israel
- Qingdao, China
- Rügen (district), Germany
- Xi'an, China

Oranienburg

- Bagnolet, France
- Hamm, Germany
- Mělník, Czech Republic
- Vught, Netherlands

Osnabrück

- Angers, France
- Çanakkale, Turkey
- Derby, England, United Kingdom
- Evansville, United States
- Gmünd in Kärnten, Austria
- Greifswald, Germany
- Gwangmyeong, South Korea
- Haarlem, Netherlands
- Hefei, China
- Tver, Russia
- Vila Real, Portugal

Osterode am Harz

- Armentières, France
- Ostróda, Poland

Ostfildern

- Bierawa, Poland
- Hohenems, Austria
- Mirandola, Italy
- Montluel, France
- Poltava, Ukraine
- Reinach, Switzerland

Ottobrunn

- Mandelieu-la-Napoule, France
- Margreid an der Weinstraße in Italy
- Nafplio, Greece

Overath

- Colne Valley, England, United Kingdom
- Pérenchies, France

== P ==
Paderborn

- Belleville, United States
- Bolton, England, United Kingdom
- Debrecen, Hungary
- Le Mans, France
- Pamplona, Spain
- Przemyśl, Poland
- Qingdao, China

Papenburg

- Pogranichny, Russia
- Rochefort, France

Passau

- Akita, Japan
- Cagnes-sur-Mer, France
- České Budějovice, Czech Republic
- Krems an der Donau, Austria
- Liuzhou, China
- Málaga, Spain
- Montecchio Maggiore, Italy
- Veszprém, Hungary

Peine

- Aschersleben, Germany
- Heywood, England, United Kingdom
- Tripoli, Greece

Pfinztal

- Rokycany, Czech Republic
- Vijfheerenlanden, Netherlands

Pforzheim

- Częstochowa, Poland
- Gernika-Lumo, Spain
- Győr-Moson-Sopron, Hungary
- Irkutsk, Russia
- Nevşehir, Turkey
- Osijek, Croatia
- Saint-Maur-des-Fossés, France
- Vicenza, Italy

Pfungstadt

- Bassetlaw, England, United Kingdom
- Figline e Incisa Valdarno, Italy
- Gradignan, France
- Hévíz, Hungary

Pinneberg

- Rockville, United States

Pirmasens

- Poissy, France

Pirna

- Baienfurt, Germany
- Bolesławiec, Poland
- Capannori, Italy
- Děčín, Czech Republic
- Longuyon, France
- Remscheid, Germany
- Varkaus, Finland

Plattling

- Scharnitz, Austria
- Selkirk, Scotland, United Kingdom

Plauen

- Aš, Czech Republic
- Cegléd, Hungary
- Hof, Germany
- Pabianice, Poland
- Šiauliai, Lithuania
- Siegen, Germany
- Steyr, Austria

Plettenberg

- Bludenz, Austria
- Schleusingen, Germany

Plochingen

- Landskrona, Sweden
- Oroszlány, Hungary
- Zwettl, Austria

Porta Westfalica

- Friedrichshain-Kreuzberg (Berlin), Germany
- Waterloo, United States

Potsdam

- Bobigny, France
- Bonn, Germany
- Ivano-Frankivsk, Ukraine
- Jyväskylä, Finland
- Lucerne, Switzerland
- Opole, Poland
- Perugia, Italy
- Sioux Falls, United States
- Versailles, France
- Zanzibar City, Tanzania

Prenzlau

- Barlinek, Poland
- Pokhvistnevo, Russia
- Uster, Switzerland
- Varėna, Lithuania

Puchheim

- Attnang-Puchheim, Austria
- Nagykanizsa, Hungary
- Salo, Finland
- Zalakaros, Hungary

Pulheim

- Fareham, England, United Kingdom
- Guidel, France

Püttlingen

- Ber, Mali
- Créhange, France
- Fresagrandinaria, Italy
- Nowa Sól, Poland
- Saint-Michel-sur-Orge, France
- Senftenberg, Germany
- Veszprém, Hungary
- Žamberk, Czech Republic

== Q ==
Quakenbrück

- Alençon, France
- Conway, United States
- Dobre Miasto, Poland
- Wesenberg, Germany

== R ==
=== Ra–Re ===
Radebeul

- Cananea, Mexico
- Obukhiv, Ukraine
- Sankt Ingbert, Germany
- Sierra Vista, United States

Radolfzell am Bodensee

- Amriswil, Switzerland
- Istres, France

Rastatt

- Fano, Italy
- Guarapuava, Brazil
- New Britain, United States
- Orange, France
- Ostrov, Czech Republic
- Woking, England, United Kingdom

Ratingen

- Beelitz, Germany
- Gagarin, Russia
- Huishan (Wuxi), China
- Kokkola, Finland
- Maubeuge, France
- Le Quesnoy, France
- Vermillion, United States

Ratzeburg

- Châtillon-sur-Seine, France
- Esbjerg, Denmark
- Esneux, Belgium
- Schönberg, Germany
- Sopot, Poland
- Strängnäs, Sweden
- Walcourt, Belgium

Ravensburg

- Brest, Belarus
- Coswig, Germany
- Mollet del Vallès, Spain
- Montélimar, France
- Rivoli, Italy
- Rhondda Cynon Taf, Wales, United Kingdom
- Varaždin, Croatia

Recklinghausen

- Acre, Israel
- Bytom, Poland
- Dordrecht, Netherlands
- Douai, France
- Preston, England, United Kingdom
- Schmalkalden, Germany

Regensburg

- Aberdeen, Scotland, United Kingdom
- Brixen, Italy
- Budavár (Budapest), Hungary
- Clermont-Ferrand, France
- Odesa, Ukraine
- Plzeň, Czech Republic
- Qingdao, China
- Tempe, United States

Reichenbach im Vogtland

- Althen-des-Paluds, France
- Jędrzejów, Poland
- Karlštejn, Czech Republic
- Ma'alot-Tarshiha, Israel
- Montecarlo, Italy
- Nordhorn, Germany
- Ročov, Czech Republic
- Waldenbuch, Germany

Reinbek

- Koło, Poland

Remscheid

- Ashington, England, United Kingdom
- Kırşehir, Turkey
- Newbiggin by the Sea, England, United Kingdom
- Pirna, Germany
- Prešov, Slovakia
- Quimper, France

Rendsburg

- Aalborg, Denmark
- Almere, Netherlands
- Haapsalu, Estonia
- Kristianstad, Sweden
- Lancaster, England, United Kingdom
- Racibórz County, Poland
- Rathenow, Germany
- Skien, Norway
- Vierzon, France

Reutlingen

- Aarau, Switzerland
- Bouaké, Ivory Coast
- Dushanbe, Tajikistan
- Ellesmere Port, England, United Kingdom
- Reading, United States
- Roanne, France
- Szolnok, Hungary

=== Rh–Ru ===
Rheda-Wiedenbrück

- Adjengré, Togo
- Aouda, Togo
- Oldenzaal, Netherlands
- Palamós, Spain

Rheinbach

- Deinze, Belgium
- Kamenický Šenov, Czech Republic
- Sevenoaks, England, United Kingdom
- Villeneuve-lès-Avignon, France

Rheinberg

- Hohenstein-Ernstthal, Germany
- Montreuil, France

Rheine

- Bernburg, Germany
- Borne, Netherlands
- Leiria, Portugal
- Trakai, Lithuania

Rheinfelden (Baden)

- Fécamp, France
- Mouscron, Belgium
- Neumarkt, Italy
- Vale of Glamorgan, Wales, United Kingdom

Riesa

- Głogów, Poland
- Lonato del Garda, Italy
- Mannheim, Germany
- Rotherham, England, United Kingdom
- Sandy, United States
- Villerupt, France
- Wuzhong (Suzhou), China

Rietberg

- Głogówek, Poland
- Ribérac, France

Rödermark

- Bodajk, Hungary
- Saalfelden am Steinernen Meer, Austria
- Tramin an der Weinstraße, Italy

Rodgau

- Donja Stubica, Croatia
- Hainburg an der Donau, Austria
- Nieuwpoort, Belgium
- Puiseaux, France

Rosenheim

- Briançon, France
- Ichikawa, Japan
- Lazise, Italy

Rösrath

- Chavenay, France
- Crespières, France
- Feucherolles, France
- Saint-Nom-la-Bretèche, France
- Veurne, Belgium

Rostock

- Aarhus, Denmark
- Antwerp, Belgium
- Bergen, Norway
- Bremen, Germany
- Dalian, China
- Dunkirk, France
- Gothenburg, Sweden
- Guldborgsund, Denmark
- Raleigh, United States
- Riga, Latvia
- Rijeka, Croatia
- Szczecin, Poland
- Turku, Finland
- Varna, Bulgaria

Roth

- Opava, Czech Republic
- Racibórz, Poland
- Regen, Germany
- Xinbei (Changzhou), China

Rothenburg ob der Tauber

- Athis-Mons, France
- Suzdal, Russia
- Telč, Czech Republic
- Montagnana, Italy
- Uchiko, Japan

Rottenburg am Neckar

- Ablis, France
- Gols, Austria
- Lion-sur-Mer, France
- Saint-Claude, France
- Yalova, Turkey

Rottweil

- L'Aquila, Italy
- Brugg, Switzerland
- Hyères, France
- Imst, Austria

Rüsselsheim am Main

- Évreux, France
- Kecskemét, Hungary
- Rugby, England, United Kingdom
- Varkaus, Finland

== S ==
=== Sa ===
Saalfeld

- Kulmbach, Germany
- Samaipata, Bolivia
- Sokolov, Czech Republic
- Stains, France
- Zalewo, Poland

Saarbrücken

- Cottbus, Germany
- Nantes, France
- Tbilisi, Georgia

Saarlouis

- Eisenhüttenstadt, Germany
- Matiguás, Nicaragua
- Saint-Nazaire, France

Salzgitter

- Créteil, France
- Gotha, Germany
- Imatra, Finland
- Stary Oskol, Russia
- Swindon, England, United Kingdom

Salzkotten

- Belleville, France
- Brüssow, Germany
- Bystřice pod Hostýnem, Czech Republic
- Cartigny-l'Épinay, France
- Cerisy-la-Forêt, France
- Seefeld in Tirol, Austria

Sangerhausen

- Baunatal, Germany
- Trnava, Slovakia
- Zabrze, Poland

Sankt Augustin

- Grantham, England, United Kingdom
- Mevaseret Zion, Israel
- Szentes, Hungary

Sankt Ingbert

- N'Diaganiao, Senegal
- Radebeul, Germany
- Saint-Herblain, France

Sankt Wendel

- Balbriggan, Ireland
- Rezé, France
- São Vendelino, Brazil

Sassnitz

- Cuxhaven, Germany
- Huai'an, China
- Kingisepp, Russia
- Klaipėda, Lithuania
- Port Washington, United States
- Trelleborg, Sweden

=== Sc ===
Schleswig

- Hillingdon, England, United Kingdom
- Mantes-la-Jolie, France
- Vejle, Denmark
- Waren, Germany

Schönebeck

- Garbsen, Germany
- Söke, Turkey
- Trakai, Lithuania

Schorndorf

- Bury, England, United Kingdom
- Dueville, Italy
- Errenteria, Spain
- Kahla, Germany
- Radenthein, Austria
- Tulle, France
- Tuscaloosa, United States

Schotten

- Arco, Italy
- Belœil, Belgium
- Crosne, France
- Maybole, Scotland, United Kingdom
- Rýmařov, Czech Republic

Schramberg

- Čakovec, Croatia
- Charleroi, Belgium
- Glashütte, Germany
- Hirson, France
- Lachen, Switzerland

Schwabach

- Kalabaka, Greece
- Kemer, Turkey
- Les Sables-d'Olonne, France

Schwäbisch Gmünd

- Antibes, France
- Barnsley, England, United Kingdom
- Bethlehem, United States
- Faenza, Italy
- Székesfehérvár, Hungary

Schwäbisch Hall

- Balıkesir, Turkey
- Épinal, France
- Lappeenranta, Finland
- Loughborough, England, United Kingdom
- Neustrelitz, Germany
- Zamość, Poland

Schwandorf

- Libourne, France
- Sokolov, Czech Republic

Schwedt

- Chojna, Poland
- Gryfino, Poland
- Koszalin, Poland
- Leverkusen, Germany
- Moryń, Poland
- Tuapse, Russia

Schweinfurt

- Châteaudun, France
- Lutsk, Ukraine
- North Lanarkshire, Scotland, United Kingdom
- Seinäjoki, Finland

Schwelm

- Saint-Germain-en-Laye, France

Schwerin

- Odense, Denmark
- Piła, Poland
- Reggio Emilia, Italy
- Tallinn, Estonia
- Vaasa, Finland
- Växjö, Sweden
- Wuppertal, Germany

Schwerte

- Allouagne, France
- Béthune, France
- Bruay-la-Buissière, France
- Cava de' Tirreni, Italy
- Hastings, England, United Kingdom
- Leppävirta, Finland
- Pyatigorsk, Russia
- Violaines, France

=== Se–Sp ===
Seelze

- Grand-Couronne, France
- Mosina, Poland
- Schkeuditz, Germany

Seesen

- Carpentras, France
- Montecorvino Rovella, Italy
- Thale, Germany
- Wantage, England, United Kingdom

Seevetal

- Decatur, United States

Senftenberg

- Fresagrandinaria, Italy
- Nowa Sól, Poland
- Püttlingen, Germany
- Saint-Michel-sur-Orge, France
- Senftenberg, Austria
- Veszprém, Hungary
- Žamberk, Czech Republic

Siegburg

- Bolesławiec, Poland
- Guarda, Portugal
- Nogent-sur-Marne, France
- Orestiada, Greece
- Selçuk, Turkey

Siegen

- Katwijk, Netherlands
- Leeds, England, United Kingdom
- Plauen, Germany
- Spandau (Berlin), Germany
- Ypres, Belgium
- Zakopane, Poland

Sindelfingen

- Chełm, Poland
- Corbeil-Essonnes, France
- Dronfield, England, United Kingdom
- East Samos, Greece
- Győr, Hungary
- Schaffhausen, Switzerland
- Sondrio, Italy
- Torgau, Germany

Singen

- Celje, Slovenia
- La Ciotat, France
- Kobeliaky, Ukraine
- Pomezia, Italy

Sinsheim

- Barcs, Hungary
- Longué-Jumelles, France

Soest

- Bangor, Wales, United Kingdom
- Gotland, Sweden
- Guérard, France
- Herzberg, Germany
- Kampen, Netherlands
- Sárospatak, Hungary
- Soest, Netherlands
- Strzelce Opolskie, Poland

Solingen

- Aue-Bad Schlema, Germany
- Blyth, England, United Kingdom
- Chalon-sur-Saône, France
- Gouda, Netherlands
- Jinotega, Nicaragua
- Ness Ziona, Israel
- Thiès, Senegal

Speyer

- Chartres, France
- Chichester, England, United Kingdom
- Gniezno, Poland
- Kursk, Russia
- Ningde, China
- Ravenna, Italy
- Yavne, Israel

Spremberg

- Grand Forks, Canada
- Szprotawa, Poland
- Zheleznogorsk, Russia

Springe

- Niort, France
- Waren, Germany

=== St–Su ===
Stade

- Giv'at Shmuel, Israel
- Gołdap, Poland
- Karlshamn, Sweden

Steinfurt

- Liedekerke, Belgium
- Neubukow, Germany
- Rijssen-Holten, Netherlands

Stendal

- Grenoble, France
- Lemgo, Germany
- Puławy, Poland
- Svitavy, Czech Republic

Stolberg (Rhineland)

- Faches-Thumesnil, France
- Stolberg (Südharz), Germany
- Valognes, France

Stralsund

- Huangshan, China
- Kiel, Germany
- Malmö, Sweden
- Pori, Finland
- Stargard, Poland
- Svendborg, Denmark
- Trelleborg, Sweden
- Ventspils, Latvia

Straubing

- Romans-sur-Isère, France
- Tuam, Ireland
- Wels, Austria

Strausberg

- Dębno, Poland
- Frankenthal, Germany
- Hamont-Achel, Belgium
- Terezín, Czech Republic

Stuhr

- Alcalá de Guadaíra, Spain
- Écommoy, France
- Ostrzeszów, Poland
- Sigulda, Latvia

Stuttgart

- Brno, Czech Republic
- Cairo, Egypt
- Cardiff, Wales, United Kingdom
- Łódź, Poland
- Menzel Bourguiba, Tunisia
- Mumbai, India
- Samara, Russia
- St Helens, England, United Kingdom
- St. Louis, United States
- Strasbourg, France

Suhl

- Bègles, France
- České Budějovice, Czech Republic
- Kaluga, Russia
- Lahti, Finland
- Leszno, Poland
- Smolyan, Bulgaria
- Würzburg, Germany

== T ==
Taunusstein

- Caldes de Montbui, Spain
- Herblay-sur-Seine, France
- Toro, Italy
- Wünschendorf/Elster, Germany
- Yeovil, England, United Kingdom

Teltow

- Ahlen, Germany
- Gonfreville-l'Orcher, France
- Rudong County, China
- Żagań, Poland

Tönisvorst

- Laakdal, Belgium
- Sées, France
- Staré Město, Czech Republic

Torgau

- Hämeenkyrö, Finland
- Sindelfingen, Germany
- Znojmo, Czech Republic

Traunstein

- Gap, France
- Haywards Heath, England, United Kingdom
- Pinerolo, Italy
- Wesseling, Germany

Treuchtlingen

- Bonyhád, Hungary
- Ponsacco, Italy

Trier

- Ascoli Piceno, Italy
- Fort Worth, United States
- 's-Hertogenbosch, Netherlands
- Gloucester, England, United Kingdom
- Metz, France
- Nagaoka, Japan
- Pula, Croatia
- Weimar, Germany
- Xiamen, China

Troisdorf

- Corfu, Greece
- Évry-Courcouronnes, France
- Genk, Belgium
- Heidenau, Germany
- Nantong, China
- Özdere (Menderes), Turkey
- Redcar and Cleveland, England, United Kingdom

Tübingen

- Aigle, Switzerland
- Aix-en-Provence, France
- Ann Arbor, United States
- Durham, England, United Kingdom
- Kilchberg, Switzerland
- Kingersheim, France
- Monthey, Switzerland
- Moshi, Tanzania
- Perugia, Italy
- Petrozavodsk, Russia
- Villa El Salvador, Peru

Tuttlingen

- Battaglia Terme, Italy
- Bex, Switzerland
- Bischofszell, Switzerland
- Draguignan, France
- Waidhofen an der Ybbs, Austria

== U ==
Übach-Palenberg

- Landgraaf, Netherlands
- Rosny-sous-Bois, France

Überlingen

- Bad Schandau, Germany
- Chantilly, France

Uelzen

- Barnstaple, England, United Kingdom
- Bois-Guillaume, France
- Kobryn, Belarus
- Tikaré, Burkina Faso

Unna

- Ajka, Hungary
- Döbeln, Germany
- Enkirch, Germany
- Palaiseau, France
- Pisa, Italy
- Waalwijk, Netherlands

Unterhaching

- Adeje, Spain
- Bischofshofen, Austria
- Le Vésinet, France
- Witney, England, United Kingdom
- Żywiec, Poland

Unterschleißheim

- Le Crès, France
- Zengőalja (microregion), Hungary

== V ==
Vaihingen an der Enz

- Kőszeg, Hungary

Vechta

- Le Cellier, France
- Jászberény, Hungary
- Saint-Pol-de-Léon, France

Velbert

- Châtellerault, France
- Corby, England, United Kingdom
- Igoumenitsa, Greece
- Podujevë, Kosovo

Verden an der Aller

- Bagrationovsk, Russia
- Bartoszyce County, Poland
- Górowo Iławeckie, Poland
- Górowo Iławeckie (rural gmina), Poland
- Havelberg, Germany
- Saumur, France
- Warwick, England, United Kingdom
- Zielona Góra, Poland

Viernheim

- Franconville, France
- Mława, Poland
- Potters Bar, England, United Kingdom
- Rovigo, Italy
- Silly, Burkina Faso

Viersen

- Calau, Germany
- Kaniv, Ukraine
- Lambersart, France
- Mittweida, Germany
- Pardesiya, Israel
- Peterborough, England, United Kingdom

Villingen-Schwenningen

- Friedrichsthal, Germany
- Pontarlier, France
- Savona, Italy
- Tula, Russia
- La Valette du Var, France
- Zittau, Germany

Voerde

- Alnwick, England, United Kingdom
- Handlová, Slovakia

Völklingen

- Ars-sur-Moselle, France
- Forbach, France
- Les Lilas, France

== W ==
=== Wa–We ===
Waiblingen

- Baja, Hungary
- Devizes, England, United Kingdom
- Jesi, Italy
- Mayenne, France
- Virginia Beach, United States

Waldkirch

- Charleroi, Belgium
- Chavanay, France
- Liestal, Switzerland
- Sélestat, France
- Worthing, England, United Kingdom

Walsrode

- Blainville-sur-Orne, France
- Gernrode (Quedlinburg), Germany
- Hibbing, United States
- Kępice, Poland
- Kovel, Ukraine
- Zaltbommel, Netherlands

Waltrop

- Cesson-Sévigné, France
- Gardelegen, Germany
- Görele, Turkey
- Herne Bay, England, United Kingdom
- San Miguelito, Nicaragua

Wangen im Allgäu

- La Garenne-Colombes, France
- Prato, Italy
- Wil, Switzerland

Waren (Müritz)

- Gorna Oryahovitsa, Bulgaria
- Magione, Italy
- Rokkasho, Japan
- Schleswig, Germany
- Springe, Germany
- Suwałki, Poland

Warendorf

- Barentin, France
- Pavilly, France
- Oleśnica, Poland
- Petersfield, England, United Kingdom

Wedel

- Caudry, France
- Makete, Tanzania
- Wolgast, Germany

Wedemark

- Roye, France

Weiden in der Oberpfalz

- Annaberg-Buchholz, Germany
- Issy-les-Moulineaux, France
- Macerata, Italy
- Mariánské Lázně, Czech Republic
- Weiden am See, Austria

Weil am Rhein

- Bognor Regis, England, United Kingdom
- Huningue, France
- Trebbin, Germany

Weilburg

- Colmar-Berg, Luxembourg
- Kežmarok, Slovakia
- Kızılcahamam, Turkey
- Privas, France
- Quattro Castella, Italy
- Zevenaar, Netherlands

Weimar

- Blois, France
- Hämeenlinna, Finland
- Siena, Italy
- Trier, Germany
- Zamość, Poland

Weingarten

- Brest, Belarus
- Bron, France
- Burgeis (Mals), Italy
- Grimma, Germany
- Mantua, Italy

Weinheim

- Anet, France
- Cavaillon, France
- Eisleben, Germany
- Imola, Italy
- Ramat Gan, Israel
- Varces-Allières-et-Risset, France

Weinstadt

- Międzychód, Poland
- Parthenay, France

Weißenfels

- Komárno, Slovakia
- Kornwestheim, Germany

Weiterstadt

- Bagno a Ripoli, Italy
- Kiens, Italy
- Verneuil-sur-Seine, France

Werl

- Halle, Belgium

Wermelskirchen

- Forst, Germany
- Loches, France

Werne

- Bailleul, France
- Kyritz, Germany
- Lytham St Annes, England, United Kingdom
- Poggibonsi, Italy
- Wałcz, Poland

Wernigerode

- Carpi, Italy
- Cisnădie, Romania
- Hội An, Vietnam
- Neustadt an der Weinstraße, Germany

Wertheim

- Csobánka, Hungary
- Godmanchester, England, United Kingdom
- Gubbio, Italy
- Huntingdon, England, United Kingdom
- Salon-de-Provence, France
- Szentendre, Hungary

Wesel

- Felixstowe, England, United Kingdom
- Hagerstown, United States
- Kętrzyn, Poland
- Salzwedel, Germany

Wesseling

- Leuna, Germany
- Pontivy, France
- Traunstein, Germany
- West Devon, England, United Kingdom

Wetzlar

- Avignon, France
- Colchester, England, United Kingdom
- Ilmenau, Germany
- Neukölln (Berlin), Germany
- Písek, Czech Republic
- Reith bei Kitzbühel, Austria
- Schladming, Austria
- Siena, Italy

Weyhe

- Cesvaine, Latvia
- Coulaines, France
- Ērgļi, Latvia
- Lubāna, Latvia
- Madona, Latvia
- Varakļāni, Latvia

=== Wi ===
Wiehl

- Bistrița, Romania
- Crimmitschau, Germany
- Hem, France
- Yokneam Illit, Israel

Wiesbaden

- Fatih, Turkey
- Fondettes, France
- Friedrichshain-Kreuzberg (Berlin), Germany
- Ghent, Belgium
- Görlitz, Germany
- Kfar Saba, Israel
- Klagenfurt, Austria
- Ljubljana, Slovenia
- Montreux, Switzerland
- Ocotal, Nicaragua
- Royal Tunbridge Wells, England, United Kingdom
- San Sebastián, Spain
- Wrocław, Poland

Wiesbaden – Biebrich

- Glarus, Switzerland

Wiesbaden – Bierstadt

- Terrasson-Lavilledieu, France
- Theux, Belgium

Wiesbaden – Mainz-Kostheim

- Sankt Veit an der Glan, Austria

Wiesloch

- Amarante, Portugal
- Fontenay-aux-Roses, France
- Sturgis, United States
- Ząbkowice Śląskie, Poland

Wilhelmshaven

- Bromberg, Austria
- Bydgoszcz, Poland
- Dunfermline, Scotland, United Kingdom
- Norfolk, United States
- Vichy, France

Willich

- Linselles, France
- Marugame, Japan
- Smiltene, Latvia
- Zogoré, Burkina Faso

Winnenden

- Albertville, France
- Santo Domingo de la Calzada, Spain

Winsen (Luhe)

- Drezdenko, Poland
- Fukui Prefecture, Japan
- Le Pont-de-Claix, France
- Pritzwalk, Germany

Wismar

- Aalborg, Denmark
- Calais, France
- Kalmar, Sweden
- Kemi, Finland
- Lübeck, Germany
- Pogradec, Albania

Witten

- Barking and Dagenham, England, United Kingdom
- Beauvais, France
- Bitterfeld-Wolfen, Germany
- Kursk, Russia
- Lev HaSharon, Israel
- Mallnitz, Austria
- Mekelle, Ethiopia
- San Carlos, Nicaragua
- Tczew, Poland

Wittenberg

- Békéscsaba, Hungary
- Beveren, Belgium
- Bretten, Germany
- Göttingen, Germany
- Haderslev, Denmark
- Mediaș, Romania
- Mogilev, Belarus
- Springfield, United States

=== Wo–Wu ===
Wolfenbüttel

- Blankenburg, Germany
- Kamienna Góra, Poland
- Kenosha, United States
- Satu Mare, Romania
- Sèvres, France

Wolfsburg

- Bielsko-Biała, Poland
- Halberstadt, Germany
- Jendouba, Tunisia
- Jiading (Shanghai), China
- Marignane, France
- Pesaro and Urbino, Italy
- Tolyatti, Russia

Worms

- Auxerre, France
- Bautzen, Germany
- Mobile, United States
- Ningde, China
- Parma, Italy
- St Albans, England, United Kingdom
- Tiberias, Israel

Worms – Pfeddersheim

- Nolay, France

Wunstorf

- Flers, France
- Wolmirstedt, Germany

Wuppertal

- Beersheba, Israel
- Košice, Slovakia
- Legnica, Poland
- Matagalpa, Nicaragua
- Saint-Étienne, France
- Schwerin, Germany
- South Tyneside, England, United Kingdom
- Tempelhof-Schöneberg (Berlin), Germany

Würselen

- Campagnatico, Italy
- Hildburghausen, Germany
- Morlaix, France
- Réo, Burkina Faso
- Ruichang, China

Würzburg

- Bray, Ireland
- Caen, France
- Dundee, Scotland, United Kingdom
- Mwanza, Tanzania
- Ōtsu, Japan
- Rochester, United States
- Salamanca, Spain
- Suhl, Germany
- Syracuse, Italy
- Trutnov, Czech Republic
- Umeå, Sweden
- Wicklow, Ireland

== X ==
Xanten

- Beit Sahour, Palestine
- Geel, Belgium
- Saintes, France
- Salisbury, England, United Kingdom

== Z ==
Zeitz

- Darkhan, Mongolia
- Detmold, Germany
- Kaliningrad, Russia
- Prescott, United States
- Tosu, Japan

Zeulenroda-Triebes

- Giengen, Germany
- Kostelec nad Orlicí, Czech Republic
- Neunkirchen am Sand, Germany
- Nýřany, Czech Republic
- Sainte-Florine, France
- Wies, Austria

Zirndorf

- Bourganeuf, France
- Koppl, Austria
- Wintersdorf (Meuselwitz), Germany

Zittau

- Bogatynia, Poland
- Hrádek nad Nisou, Czech Republic
- Liberec, Czech Republic
- Pistoia, Italy
- Portsmouth, United States
- Villingen-Schwenningen, Germany
- Zielona Góra, Poland

Zweibrücken

- Barrie, Canada
- Boulogne-sur-Mer, France
- Yorktown, United States

Zwickau

- Dortmund, Germany
- Jablonec nad Nisou, Czech Republic
- Volodymyr, Ukraine
- Yandu (Yancheng), China
- Zaanstad, Netherlands
