= Barga =

Barga may refer to:

== People ==
- Barga Mongols in the early 20th century

== Places ==
- Barga (department), Burkina Faso
- Barga, Tuscany, Italy

== Other ==
- Barga (kingdom), in ancient Syria
- Operation Barga
