= Kossouka (department) =

- Department
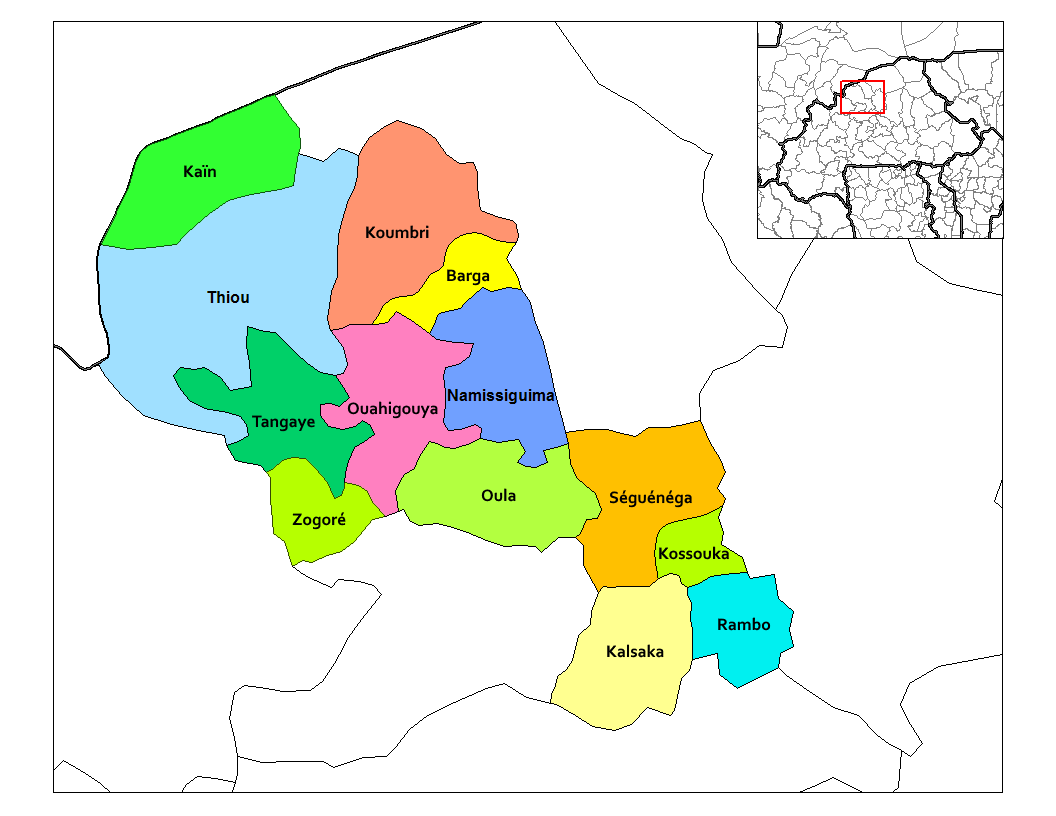
- Kossouka Department location in the province
- Country: Burkina Faso
- Region: Hauts-Bassins Region
- Province: Yatenga Province

Area
  - Total: 64.6 sq mi (167.4 km^{2})

Population (2019 census)
  - Total: 26,926
  - Density: 416.6/sq mi (160.8/km^{2})
- Time zone: UTC+0 (GMT 0)

Kossouka is a department or commune of Yatenga Province in Burkina Faso. It is located near the upper reaches of the White Volta River, on the border with Mali and north of the country's capital, Ouagadougou.

As of 2019, it had an estimated population of 26,900 inhabitants.
