= Willich =

- Town
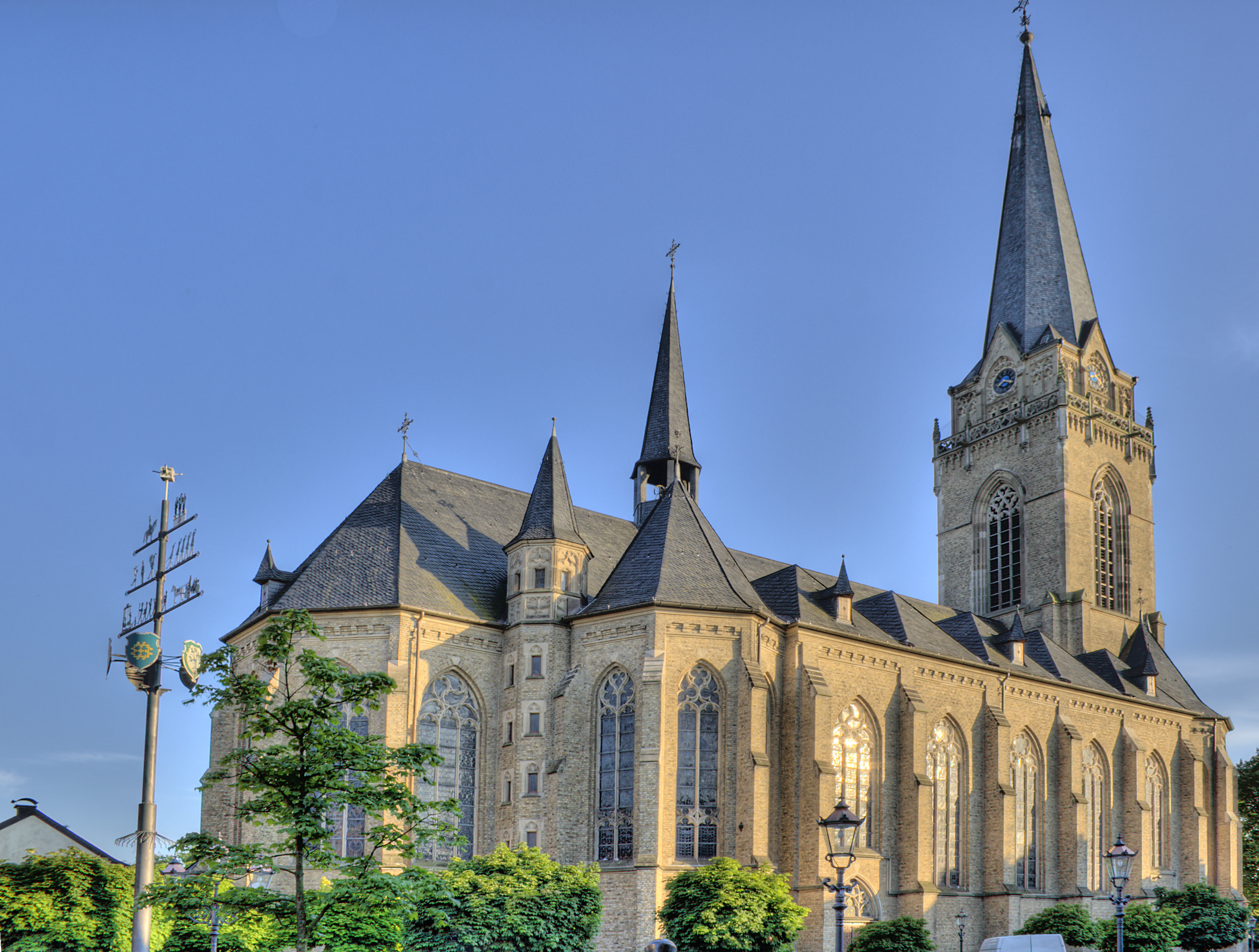
- Church of Saint Catherine

- Coat of arms

- Location of Willich within Viersen district
- Interactive map of Willich
- Location within Germany Location within North Rhine-Westphalia
- Coordinates: 51°15′47″N 6°32′57″E
- Country: Germany
- State: North Rhine-Westphalia
- Admin. region: Düsseldorf
- District: Viersen
- Subdivisions: 4

Government
  - Mayor (2020–25): Christian Pakusch (CDU)

Area
  - Total: 67.8 km^{2} (26.2 sq mi)
- Elevation: 40 m (130 ft)

Population (2025-12-31)
  - Total: 49,374
  - Density: 728/km^{2} (1,890/sq mi)
- Time zone: UTC+01:00 (CET)
  - Summer (DST): UTC+02:00 (CEST)
- Postal codes: 47877
- Dialling codes: 02154, 02156
- Vehicle registration: VIE
- Website: www.stadt-willich.de

Willich (German pronunciation: [ˈvɪlɪç]) is a town in the district of Viersen, in North Rhine-Westphalia, Germany. It is 20 km west of Düsseldorf, 14 km north of Mönchengladbach, 10 km south of Krefeld, about 30 kilometres east of the border with the Netherlands and 45 km east of Roermond.

== History ==
The city was founded in 1970 out of the formerly independent villages of Willich, Anrath, Schiefbahn and Neersen, although the villages are much older. Anrath was mentioned for the first time in 1010, Willich in 1245, Neersen in 1262 and Schiefbahn in 1420.

The villages belonged to the Electorate of Cologne until the French Revolutionary Wars: in 1794, French troops occupied the left bank of the Rhine; France annexed the territory later (1797/1801) and kept it until 1814. After the Battle of Waterloo (June 1815), the Congress of Vienna was held and the villages fell to the Kingdom of Prussia.

=== 1891–1945 ===
In 1891 a tornado devastated Anrath. The village was already impoverished by the decline of previously dominant domestic weaving and now the municipal administration of Anrath even considered a dissolution of the village. To improve the economic situation a royal prison was built. It was completed in 1905.

In 1908 Stahlwerk Becker (a steel mill) was built and up to its closing in 1932 (during the Great Depression) was one of the largest employers in Willich. After the Nazi seizure of power (30 January 1933), the steel mill got a new owner and was reopened in 1934. Military supplies (at first for the German rearmament and later for World War II) were manufactured there. The factory was finally closed in 1945 and the grounds were converted to a military base for the British Armed Forces.

During World War II, Willich suffered only minor damage to its infrastructure. During Operation Grenade on March 1, 1945, American forces which had entered Schiefbahn met a counterattack from a German Panzer unit. Heavy fighting erupted, with both sides suffering numerous casualties.

During the 19th century more than 100 Jews lived in the four villages. During the Third Reich, the Nazis deported 40 Jews – of whom 38 were ultimately murdered in the Nazi death camps.

=== British Army ===
The British Army of the Rhine had soldiers stationed in Willich for more than 40 years: 40 Army Engineer Support Regiment (40 AESR), which by the early 1980s was reduced down to 40 Army Engineer Support Group (40 AESG). Both units belonged to the Royal Engineers. In 1992 the camp was closed and the group disbanded. In July 2009 a reunion took place in the old camp. 141 attended the evening event. There was a reunion again in 2012 with over 200 joining in the complete weekend.

== Economy ==
Some international companies, especially from the Far East, have their European or German headquarters in Willich.

== Population ==
Historical population

Year	Pop.	±% p.a.
1965	34,344	—
1970	37,870	+1.97%
1975	38,958	+0.57%
1980	39,115	+0.08%
1985	39,890	+0.39%
1990	42,416	+1.24%
1995	45,932	+1.61%

Year	Pop.	±% p.a.
2000	50,300	+1.83%
2005	51,939	+0.64%
2010	51,949	+0.00%
2015	50,748	−0.47%
2020	50,283	−0.18%
2025	49,374	−0.36%

Source: Landesdatabank Nordrhein-Westfalen

== Transportation ==
=== Streets ===
There is an Interchange between Bundesautobahn 44 and Bundesautobahn 52 motorways within the municipal area of Willich. In the area there are five junctions.

=== Railway ===
The railway station in Anrath is on the railway between Duisburg and Mönchengladbach.

== Notable places ==
=== Schloss Neersen ===
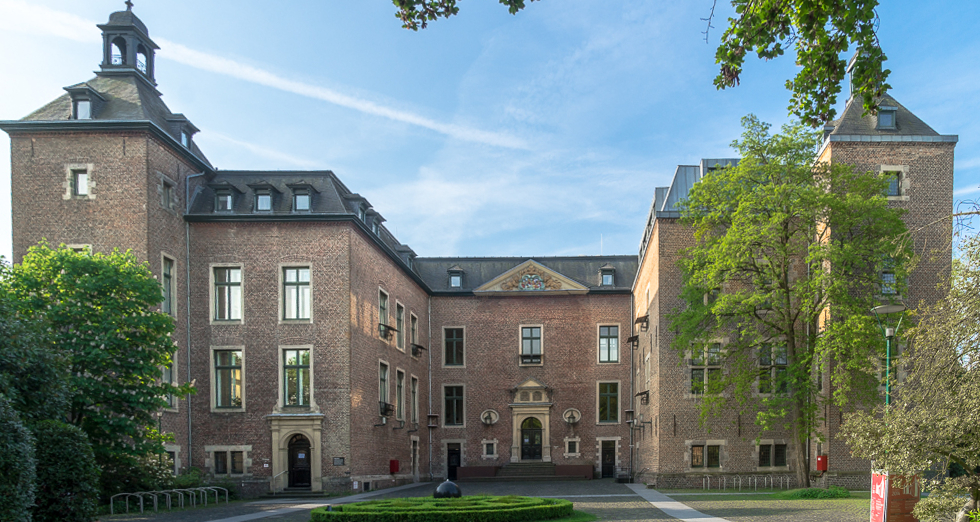
Schloss Neersen

The most famous building is Schloss Neersen. The castle goes back to the 13th century and was heavily rebuilt in the 17th century. It now houses many town council offices. An open-air summer theatre is held in the grounds.

=== Klein-Jerusalem chapel ===
A moderately well-known pilgrimage destination is the 17th century Klein-Jerusalem wayside chapel.

=== Anrath Prison ===
The former royal prison in Anrath is now a federal state prison named Justizvollzugsanstalt Willich.

== Twin towns – sister cities ==
Willich is twinned with:

- Linselles, France
- Marugame, Japan
- Smiltene, Latvia
- Zogoré, Burkina Faso
