= Kalsaka Department =

Coordinates: 13°10′51″N 1°58′46″W

Kalsaka
- Department
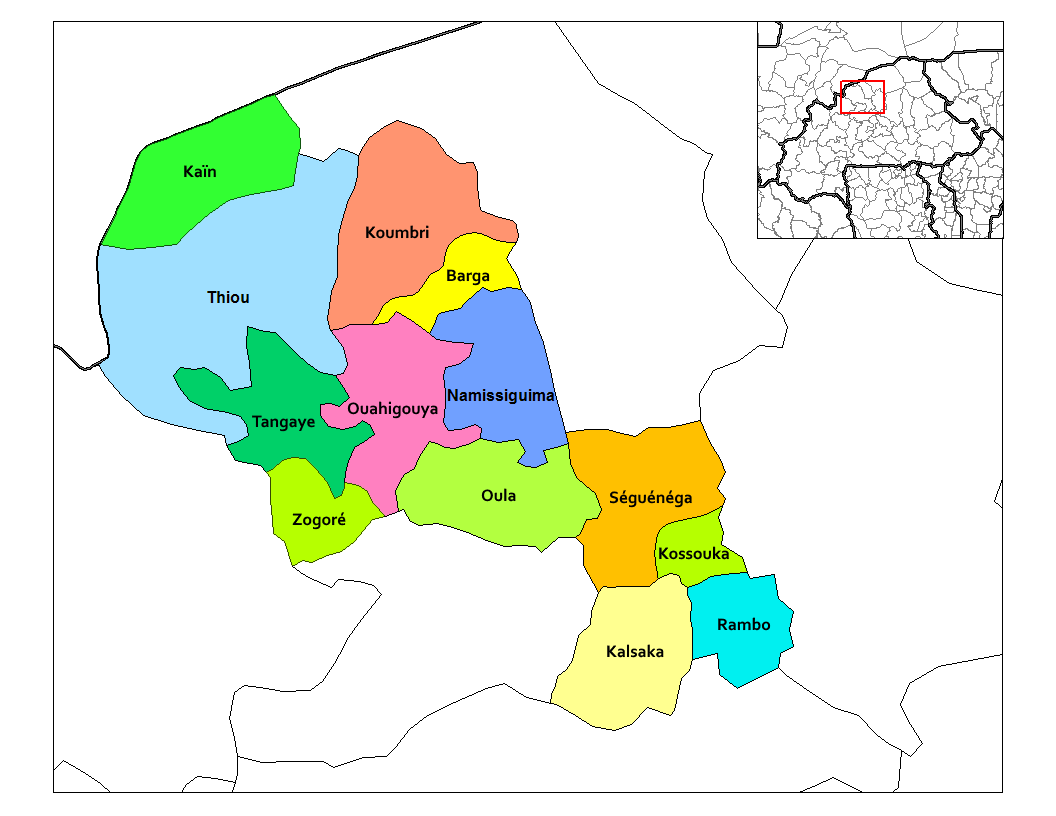
- Kalsaka Department location in the province
- Country: Burkina Faso
- Province: Yatenga Province

Area
  - Total: 226.0 sq mi (585.3 km^{2})

Population (2019 census)
  - Total: 78,184
  - Density: 346.0/sq mi (133.6/km^{2})
- Time zone: UTC+0 (GMT 0)

Kalsaka is a department or commune of Yatenga Province in northern Burkina Faso. Its capital lies at the town of Kalsaka.
