= Yatenga Province =

Coordinates: 13°35′N 2°25′W

Yatenga
- Province
- Location in Burkina Faso

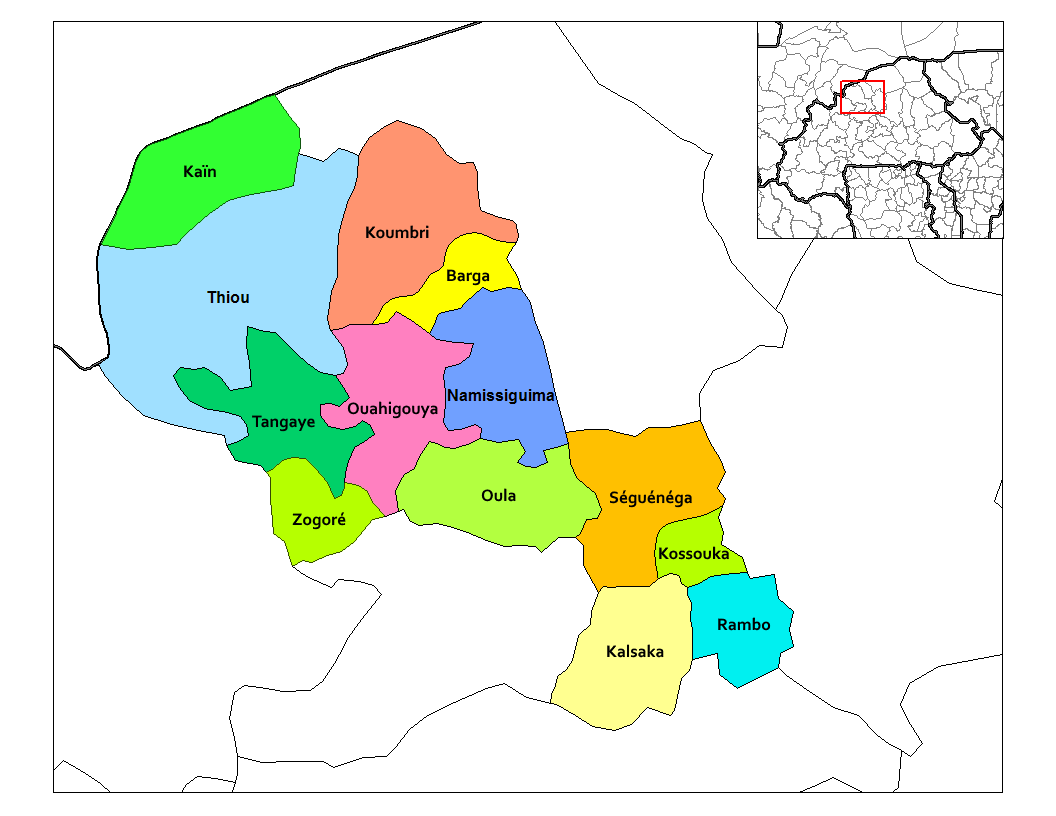
- Provincial map of its departments
- Country: Burkina Faso
- Region: Nord Region
- Capital: Ouahigouya

Area
  - Province: 6,987 km^{2} (2,698 sq mi)

Population (2019 census)
  - Province: 824,994
  - Density: 118.1/km^{2} (305.8/sq mi)
  - Urban: 124,587
- Time zone: UTC+0 (GMT 0)
- ISO 3166 code: BF-YAT

Yatenga is one of the provinces of Burkina Faso, located in the Nord Region of the country. In modern Yatenga, the most prominent city is Ouahigouya (also known as Waiguya). This city served as the capital of the kingdom of Yatenga, a powerful kingdom out of the many Mossi kingdoms, but its influence decreased in the century following French colonisation. The city is famed today for being home to the Naba's (traditional kings) compound and the tomb of Naba Kango.

== History ==
=== Kingdom of Yatenga ===
Yatenge was historically a powerful kingdom in the region. It was founded as a Mossi state along with Ouagadougou, Tenkodogo, and Gourma by invaders from neighbouring Ghana. Each of the Mossi states (including Yatenga) possessed a strong military that was able to repel attacks from hostile tribes and nations.

When the European powers began their scramble for territory in Africa in the 19th century, France brokered a deal making Yatenga a French protectorate. Following the annexation of the other Mossi states, the area was governed as Upper Volta until the nation's independence on August 5, 1960.

In the modern day, the Kingdom of Yatenga continues on as a traditional monarchy within Burkina Faso.

=== Modern history ===
On 5 September 2023, seventeen Burkinabé soldiers, thirty-six VDP militiamen, and several dozen Jama'at Nasr al-Islam wal Muslimin militants were killed during fighting in the Province.

== Education ==
In 2011 the province had 588 primary schools and 57 secondary schools.

== Healthcare ==
In 2011 the province had 60 health and social promotion centres (Centres de santé et de promotion sociale), 20 doctors and 207 nurses.

== Culture ==
The Yatenga region is renowned for its unique style of Mossi masks. They are tall, vertically oriented, and concave-faced. They are considered to be some of the best examples of Mossi art available today.

A prominent dance of the Yatenga region is the liwaga.

== Departments ==
Yatenga is divided into 13 departments:

- Barga Department
- Kaïn Department
- Kalsaka Department
- Koumbri Department
- Kossouka Department
- Namissiguima Department
- Ouahigouya Department
- Oula Department
- Rambo Department
- Séguénéga Department
- Tangaye Department
- Thiou Department
- Zogoré Department

== See also ==
- Rulers of the Mossi state of Yatenga
- Regions of Burkina Faso
- Provinces of Burkina Faso
- Departments of Burkina Faso
