= Thiou Department =

Coordinates: 13°48′N 2°40′W

Thiou
- Department
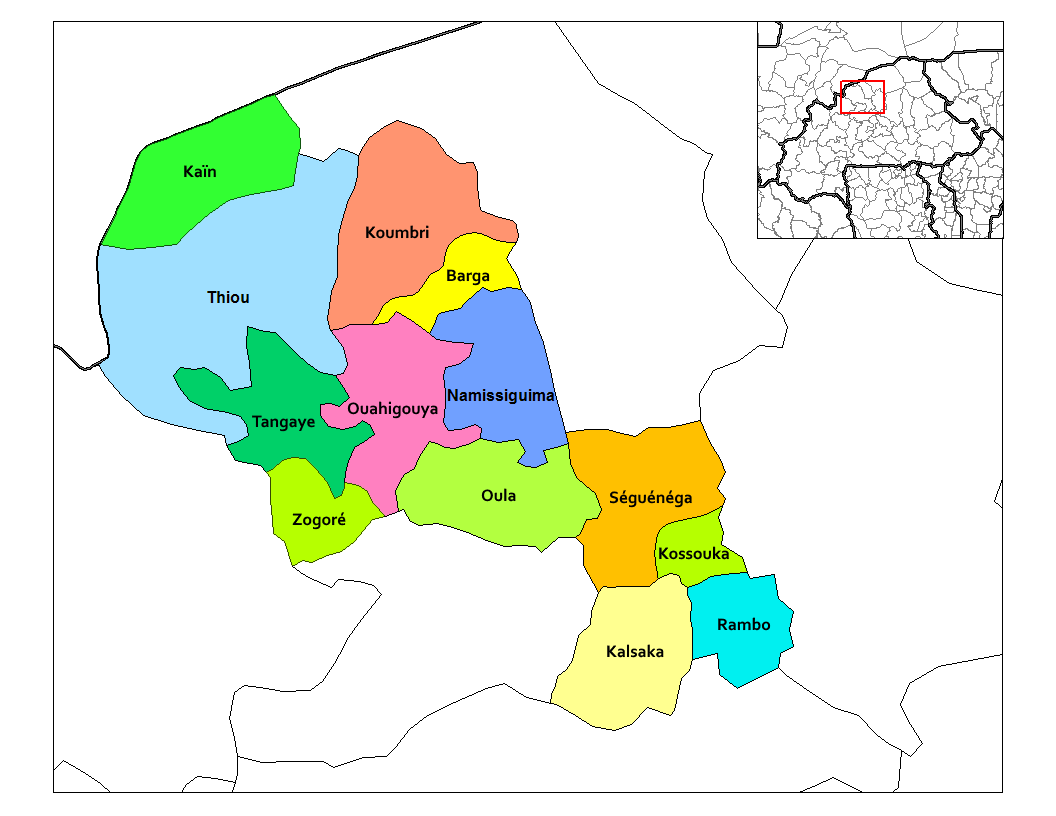
- Thiou Department location in the province
- Country: Burkina Faso
- Province: Yatenga Province

Area
  - Total: 462 sq mi (1,197 km^{2})

Population (2019 census)
  - Total: 66,589
- Time zone: UTC+0 (GMT 0)

Thiou is a department or commune of Yatenga Province in northern Burkina Faso. Its capital lies at the town of Thiou.
