= Oula Department =

Coordinates: 13.4833°N 2.3333°W

Oula
- Department
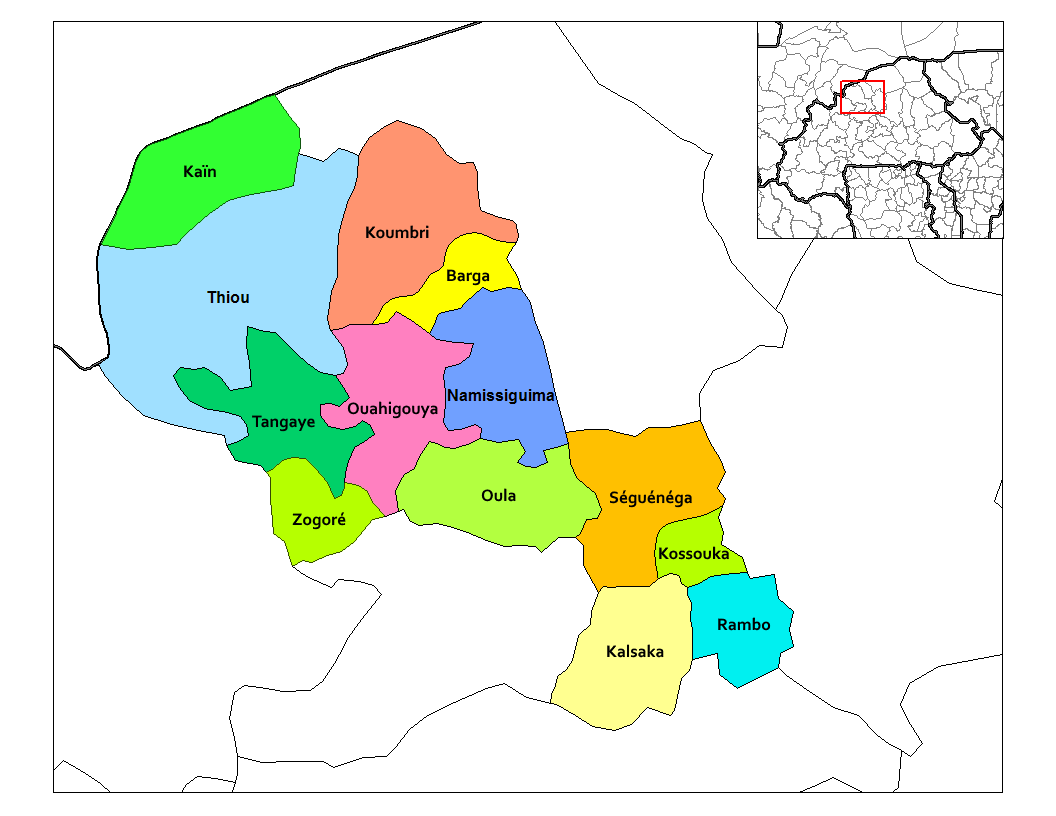
- Oula Department location in the province
- Country: Burkina Faso
- Province: Yatenga Province

Area
  - Total: 216.3 sq mi (560.2 km^{2})

Population (2019 census)
  - Total: 46,957
  - Density: 217.1/sq mi (83.82/km^{2})
- Time zone: UTC+0 (GMT 0)

Oula is a department or commune of Yatenga Province in northern Burkina Faso. Its capital lies at the town of Oula.
