= Tangaye Department =

Coordinates: 13.55°N 2.55°W

Tangaye
- Department
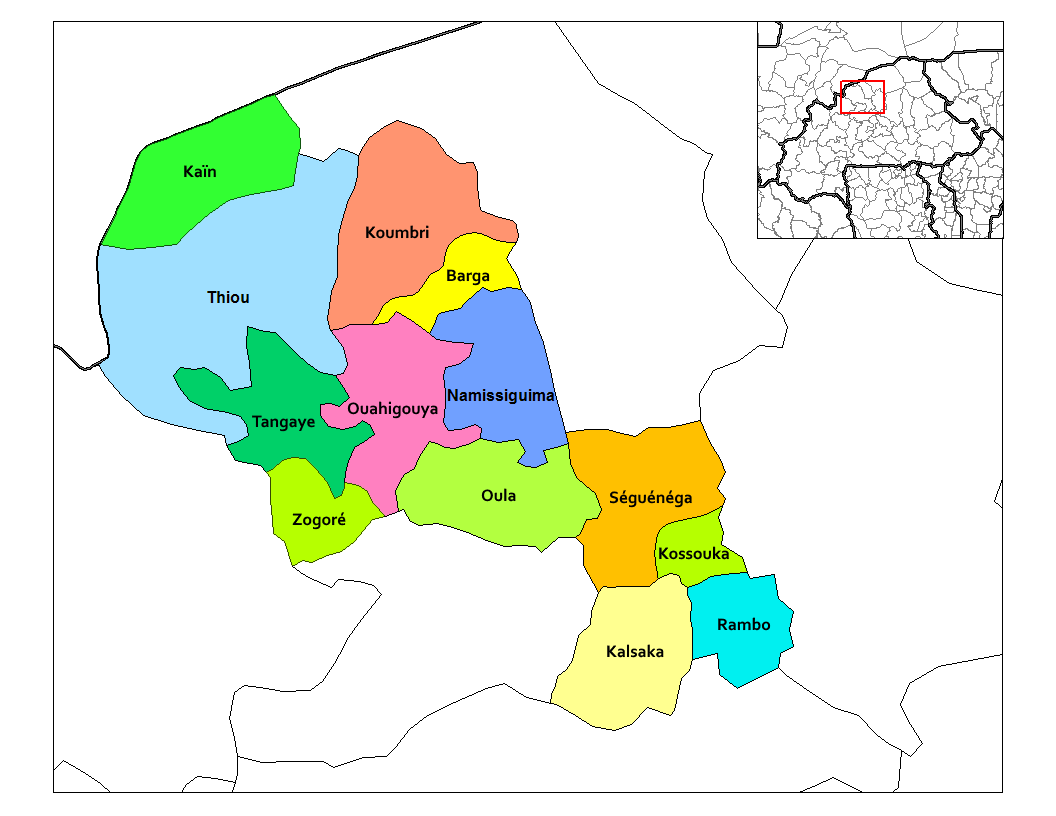
- Tangaye Department location in the province
- Country: Burkina Faso
- Province: Yatenga Province

Area
  - Total: 189.3 sq mi (490.4 km^{2})

Population (2019 census)
  - Total: 39,262
- Time zone: UTC+0 (GMT 0)

Tangaye is a department or commune of Yatenga Province in northern Burkina Faso. Its capital lies at the town of Tangaye.
