= Meuselwitz =

- Town
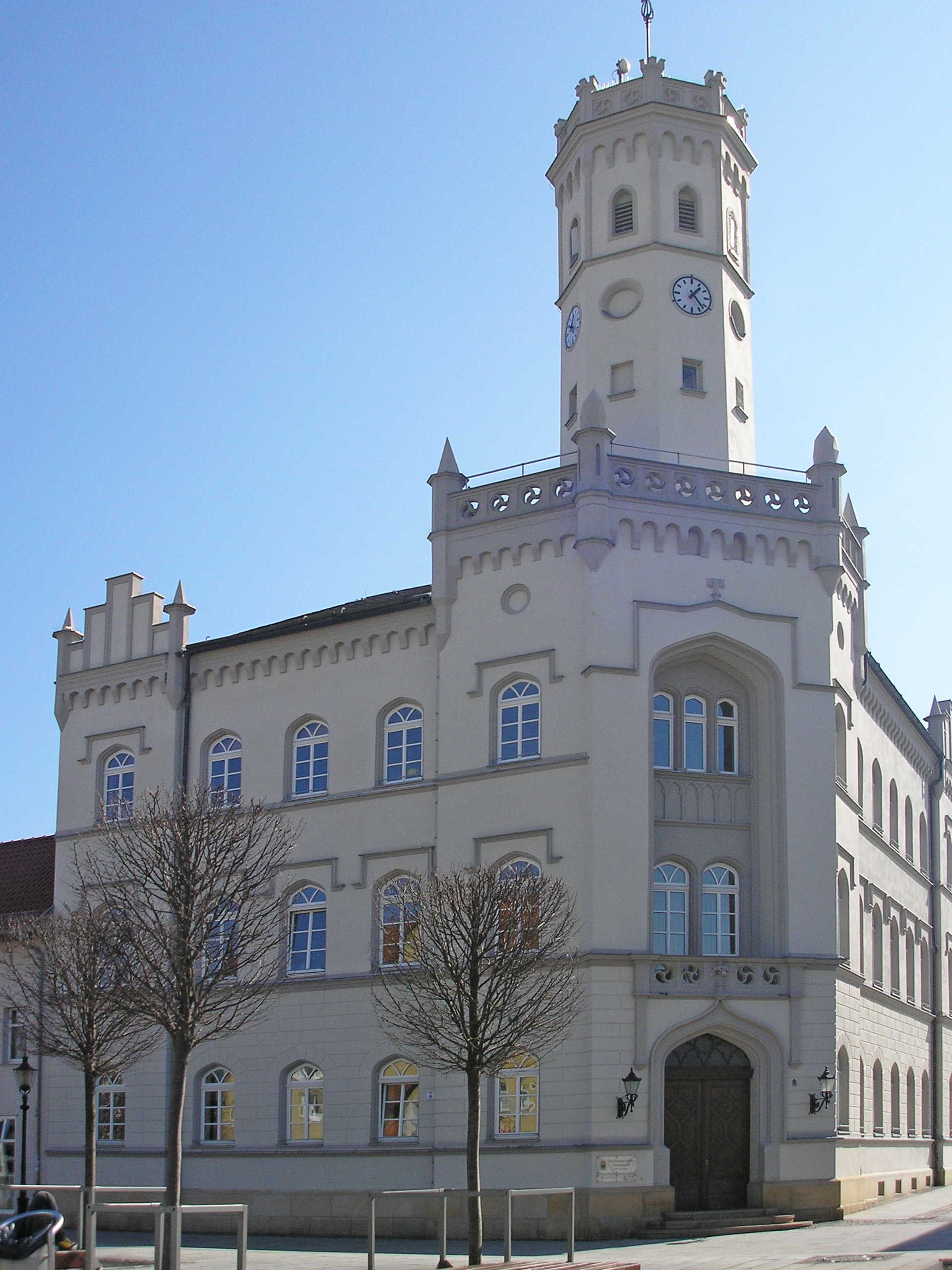
- Town hall

- Coat of arms

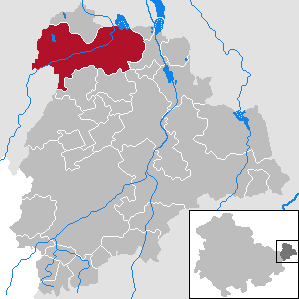
- Location of Meuselwitz within Altenburger Land district
- Interactive map of Meuselwitz
- Location within Germany Location within Thuringia
- Coordinates: 51°3′N 12°18′E
- Country: Germany
- State: Thuringia
- District: Altenburger Land

Government
  - Mayor (2021–27): Ronny Dathe

Area
  - Total: 53.66 km^{2} (20.72 sq mi)
- Elevation: 170 m (560 ft)

Population (2025-12-31)
  - Total: 10,148
  - Density: 189.1/km^{2} (489.8/sq mi)
- Time zone: UTC+01:00 (CET)
  - Summer (DST): UTC+02:00 (CEST)
- Postal codes: 04610
- Dialling codes: 03448
- Vehicle registration: ABG
- Website: www.meuselwitz.de

Meuselwitz (German pronunciation: [ˈmɔʏzlˌ̩vɪts]) is a town in the Altenburger Land district, in Thuringia, Germany. It is situated 12 km northwest of Altenburg and 11 km east of Zeitz.

== History ==
During World War II, a subcamp of the Buchenwald concentration camp operated here. It provided slave labour for HASAG, the third largest consumer of forced labour during the war. All satellites of Buchenwald were HASAG factories. The Meuselwitz plant used 1,666 prisoners, of which, 1,376 were women. The SS charged less for women; they had a higher mortality rate. Wintersdorf has been part of the town Meuselwitz since December 1, 2007.

== People ==
- Wolfgang Hilbig (1941-2007), German author and poet
