= Wintersdorf =

- Village of Meuselwitz
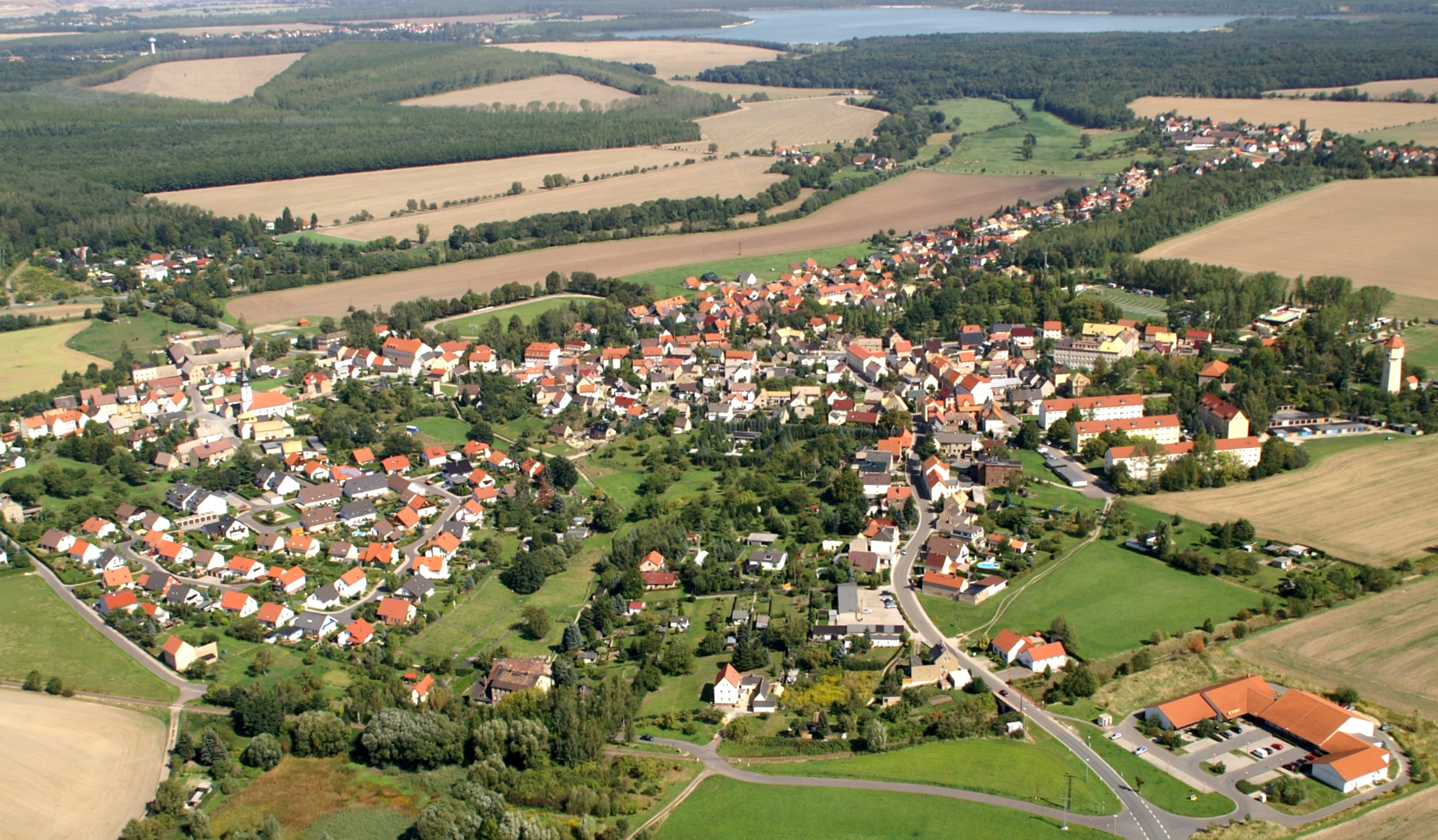
- Aerial view of Wintersdorf

- Coat of arms
- Interactive map of Wintersdorf
- Location within Germany Location within Thuringia
- Coordinates: 51°3′17″N 12°21′23″E
- Country: Germany
- State: Thuringia
- District: Altenburger Land
- Town: Meuselwitz

Area
  - Total: 30.87 km^{2} (11.92 sq mi)
- Elevation: 176 m (577 ft)

Population (2006-12-31)
  - Total: 2,873
  - Density: 93.07/km^{2} (241.0/sq mi)
- Time zone: UTC+01:00 (CET)
  - Summer (DST): UTC+02:00 (CEST)
- Postal codes: 04610
- Dialling codes: 03448
- Website: www.wintersdorf.de

Wintersdorf (German pronunciation: [ˈvɪntɐsˌdɔʁf]) is a former municipality in the district Altenburger Land, in Thuringia, Germany. Since 1 December 2007, it is part of the town Meuselwitz.
