= Barga (department) =

- Department
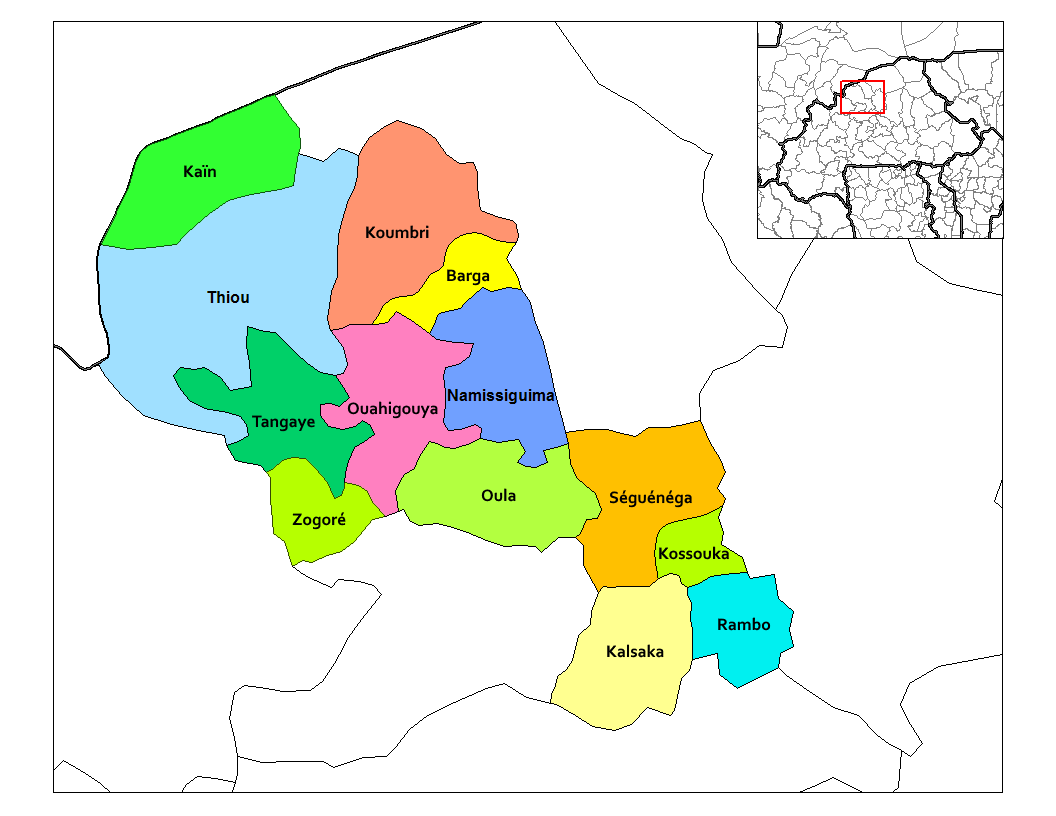
- Barga Department location in the province
- Country: Burkina Faso
- Region: Hauts-Bassins Region
- Province: Yatenga Province

Area
  - Total: 78.1 sq mi (202.4 km^{2})

Population (2019 census)
  - Total: 51,248
  - Density: 655.8/sq mi (253.2/km^{2})
- Time zone: UTC+0 (GMT 0)

Barga is a department or commune of Yatenga Province in Burkina Faso.
