= Zogoré Department =

Coordinates: 13°24′N 2°36′W

Zogoré
- Department
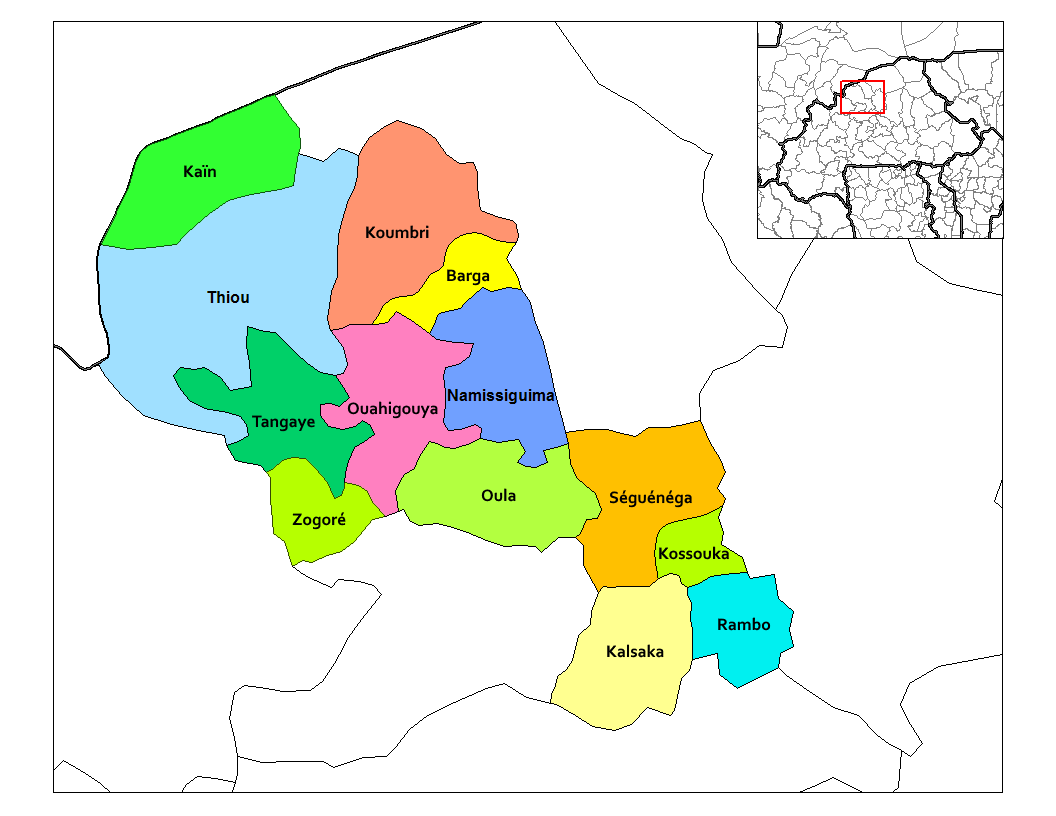
- Zogoré Department location in the province
- Country: Burkina Faso
- Province: Yatenga Province

Area
  - Total: 91.9 sq mi (238.0 km^{2})

Population (2019 census)
  - Total: 23,478
- Time zone: UTC+0 (GMT 0)

Zogoré is a department or commune of Yatenga Province in northern Burkina Faso. Its capital lies at the town of Zogoré.
