= Nürnberg Nordost station =

Railway station in Nuremberg, Germany

Nürnberg Nordost
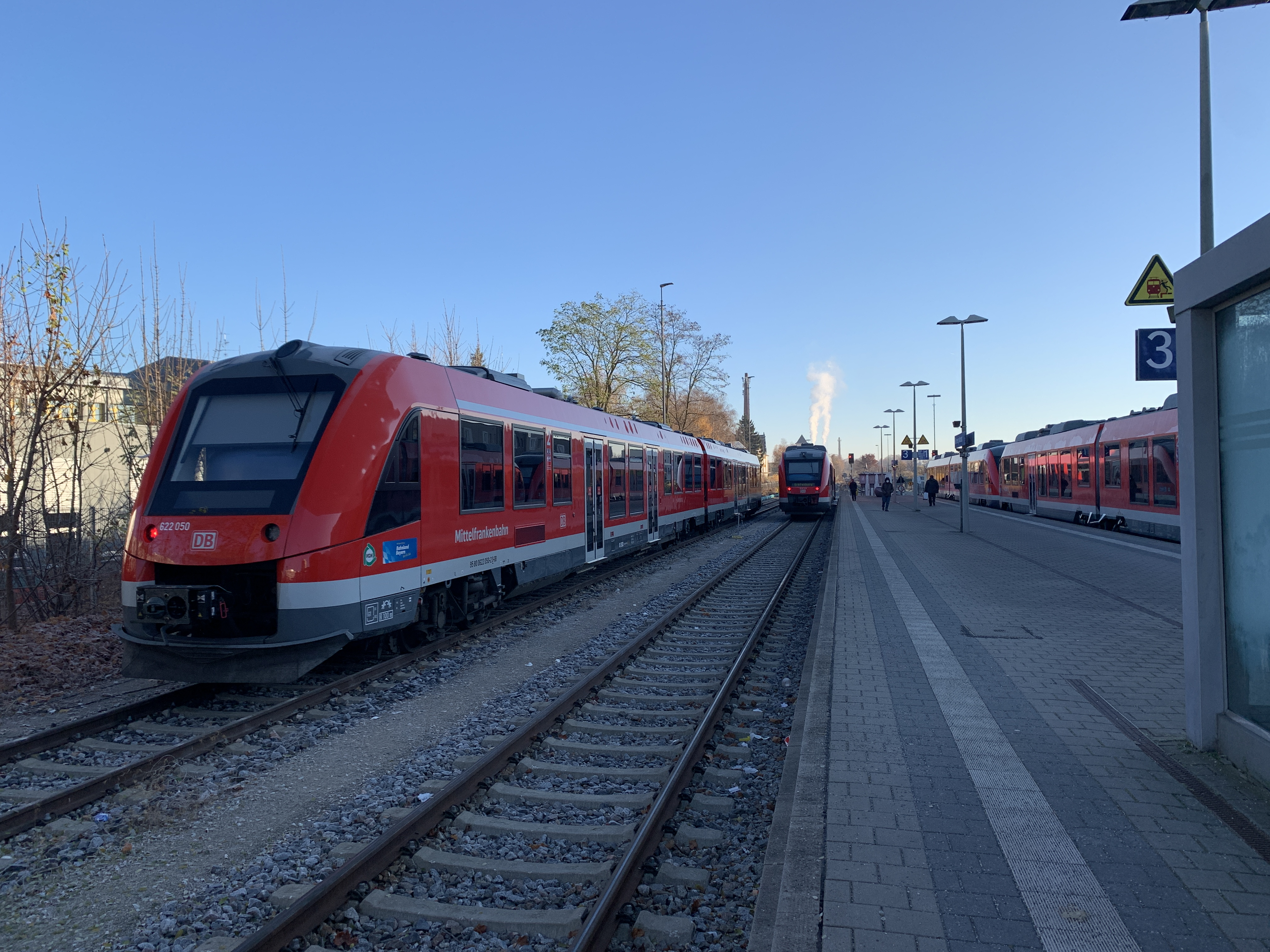
- 2021

General information
- Location: Am Nordostbahnhof 5; 90491 Nürnberg; Bavaria, Germany
- Elevation: 321 m (1,053 ft)
- Owner: DB Netz
- Operator: DB Station&Service
- Lines: Nuremberg Ring Railway; Gräfenberg Railway (KBS 861)
- Platforms: 1 island platform
- Tracks: 3
- Train operators: DB Regio Bayern

Other information
- Station code: 4594
- DS100 code: NNRO
- IBNR: 8004469
- Category: 6
- Fare zone: VGN: 100 and 200
- Website: www.bahnhof.de

History
- Opened: 1 July 1899; 127 years ago

Services
Preceding station	DB Regio Bayern	Following station
Terminus	RB 21	Heroldsberg towards Gräfenberg
Location

The station Nürnberg Nordost (translates from German as Nuremberg North East), colloquial form Nordostbahnhof, is a railway station in Nuremberg, Germany. It is a terminal station, providing a link to Gräfenberg, as the line to Gräfenberg has no connection to Nürnberg Hauptbahnhof, the city's main station.

The station has an interchange with the line of the Nuremberg U-Bahn.

== History ==
The station was built by the Royal Bavarian State Railways and opened on 1 July 1899 together with the Nuremberg Ring Railway section Nuremberg East-Nuremberg North. In the beginning it was only used for freight traffic, for which various loading tracks and a goods shed were built. Passenger traffic began with the opening of the Gräfenbergbahn on 1 February 1908, from which between 1911 and 1912 occasional journeys via the Nuremberg Ring Railway and the Nuremberg–Cheb railway to Nürnberg Hauptbahnhof were extended. With the exception of these connections, the station has since been operated as an island station for passenger transport, which was connected to Hauptbahnhof by tram until 1996 and by underground since then. In the 1990s, the loading of goods was abandoned, the tracks were gradually dismantled and the station building demolished. The last reconstruction took place with the refurbishment of the Gräfenbergbahn between July and September 1999. In addition to the construction of a new island platform and direct access to the Nordostbahnhof underground station, the overpass over the Äußere Bayreuther Straße (B 2) was renewed and a 208 m-long (682 ft) siding was built.

== Gallery ==
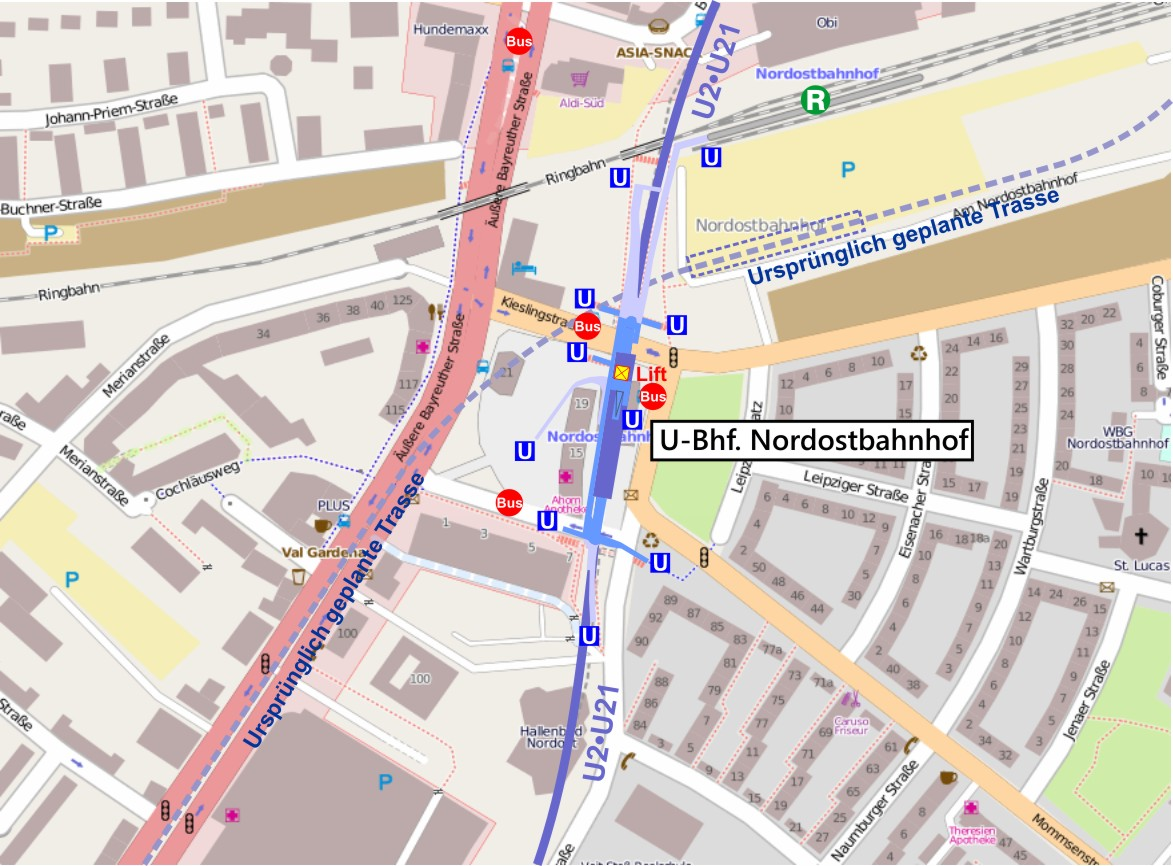
Location map of Nordostbahnhof

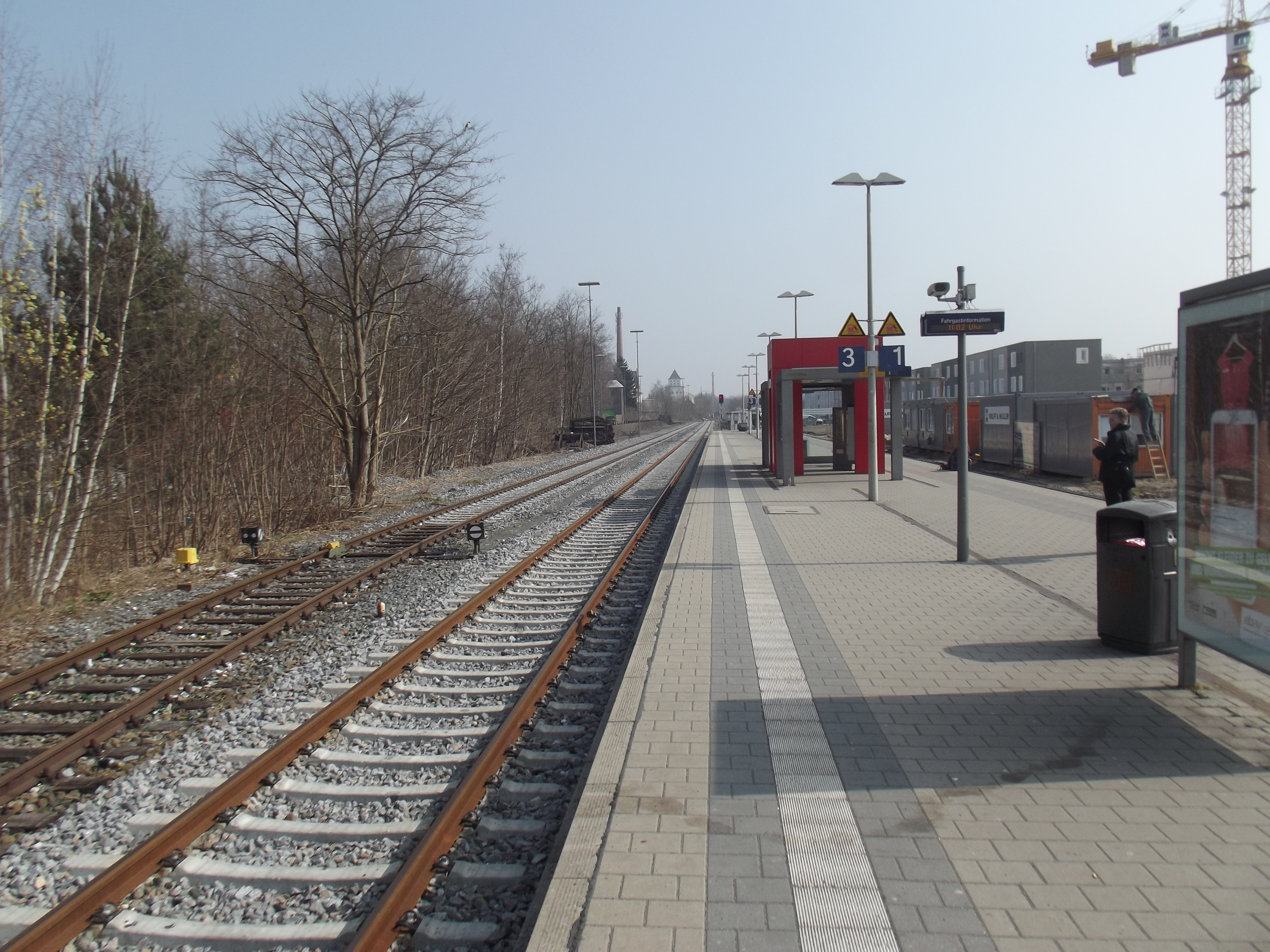
View from track 3 direction Gräfenberg

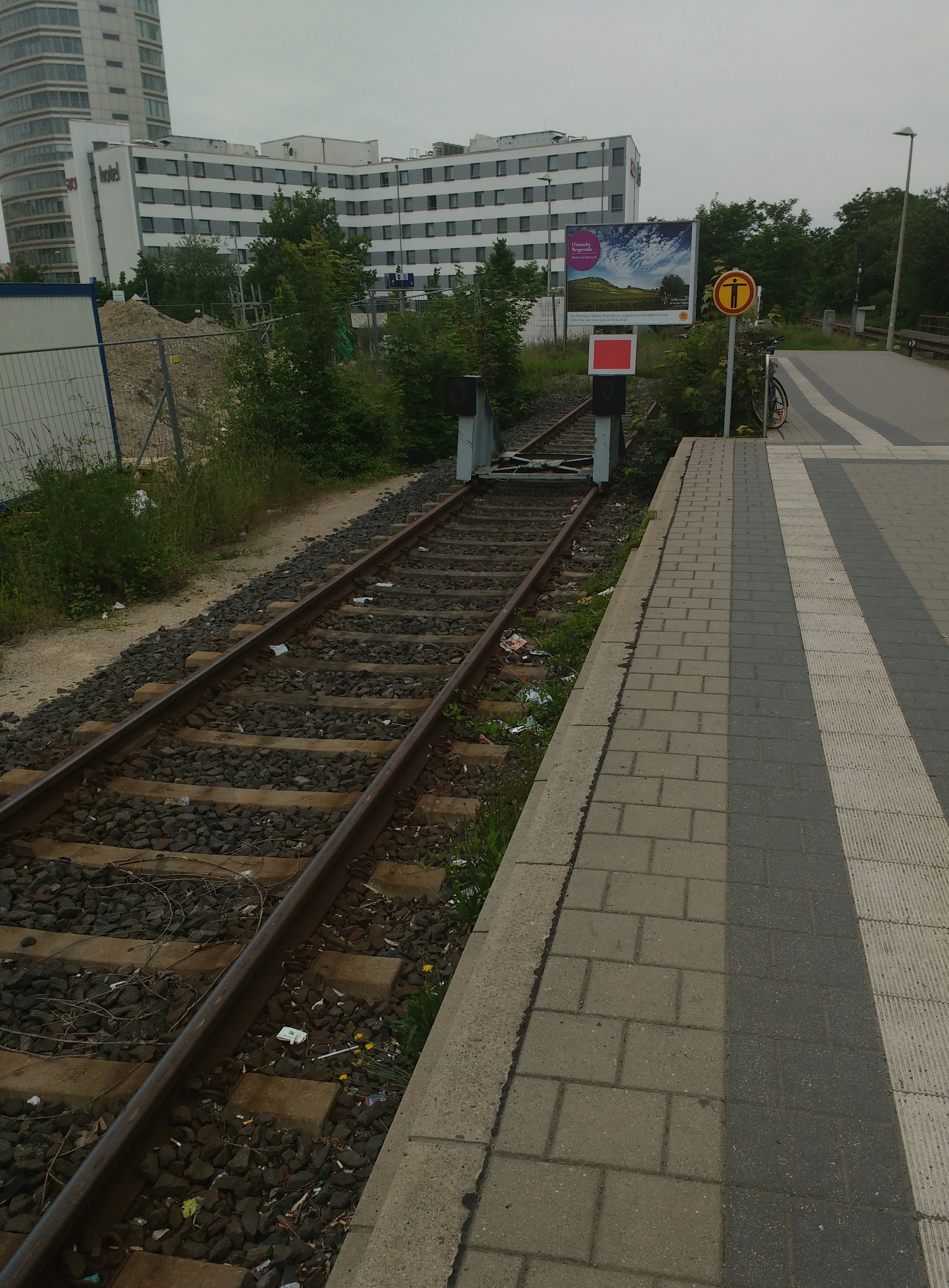
Track 1 with buffer

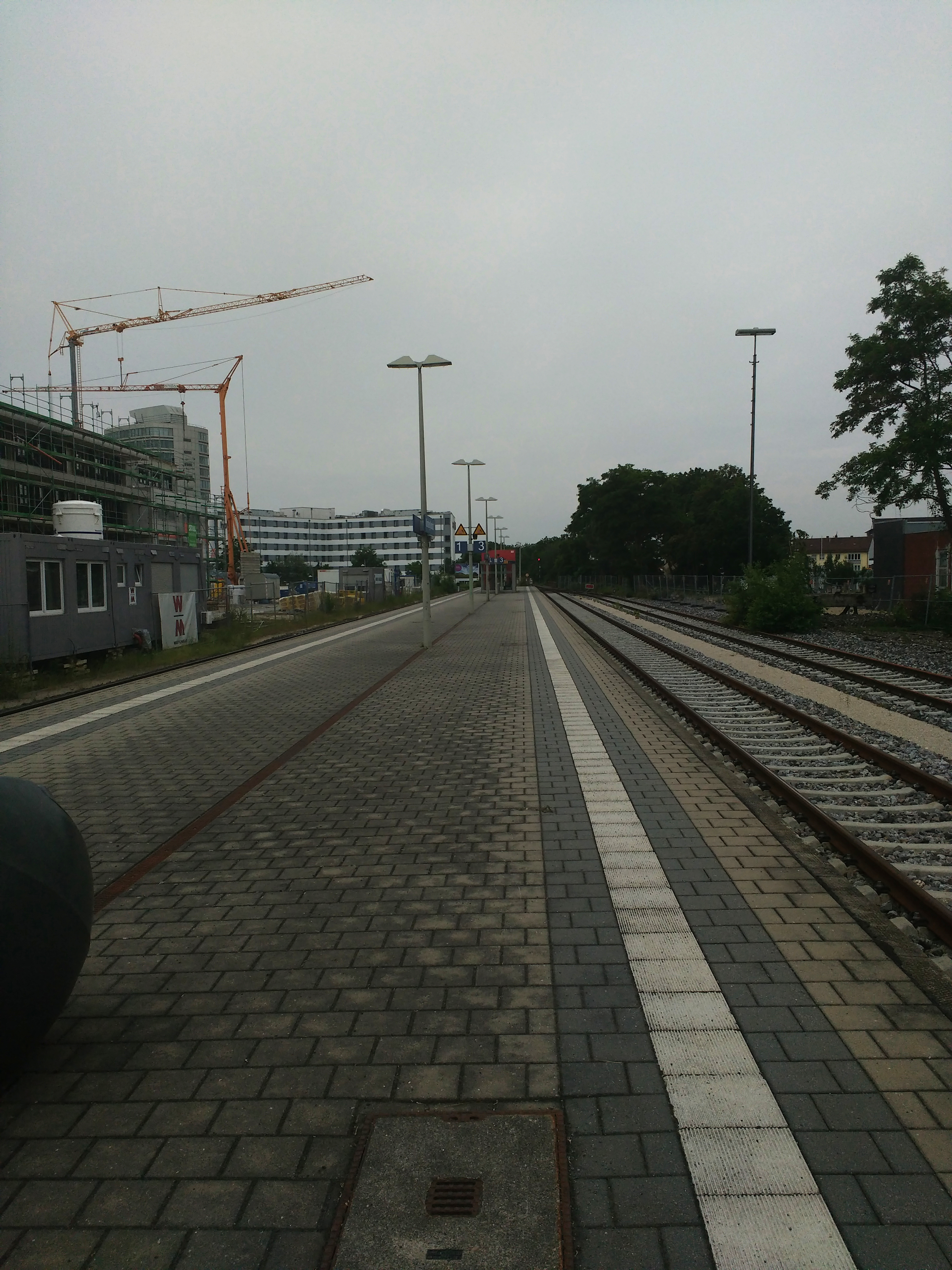
View from track 3 towards Leipziger Platz

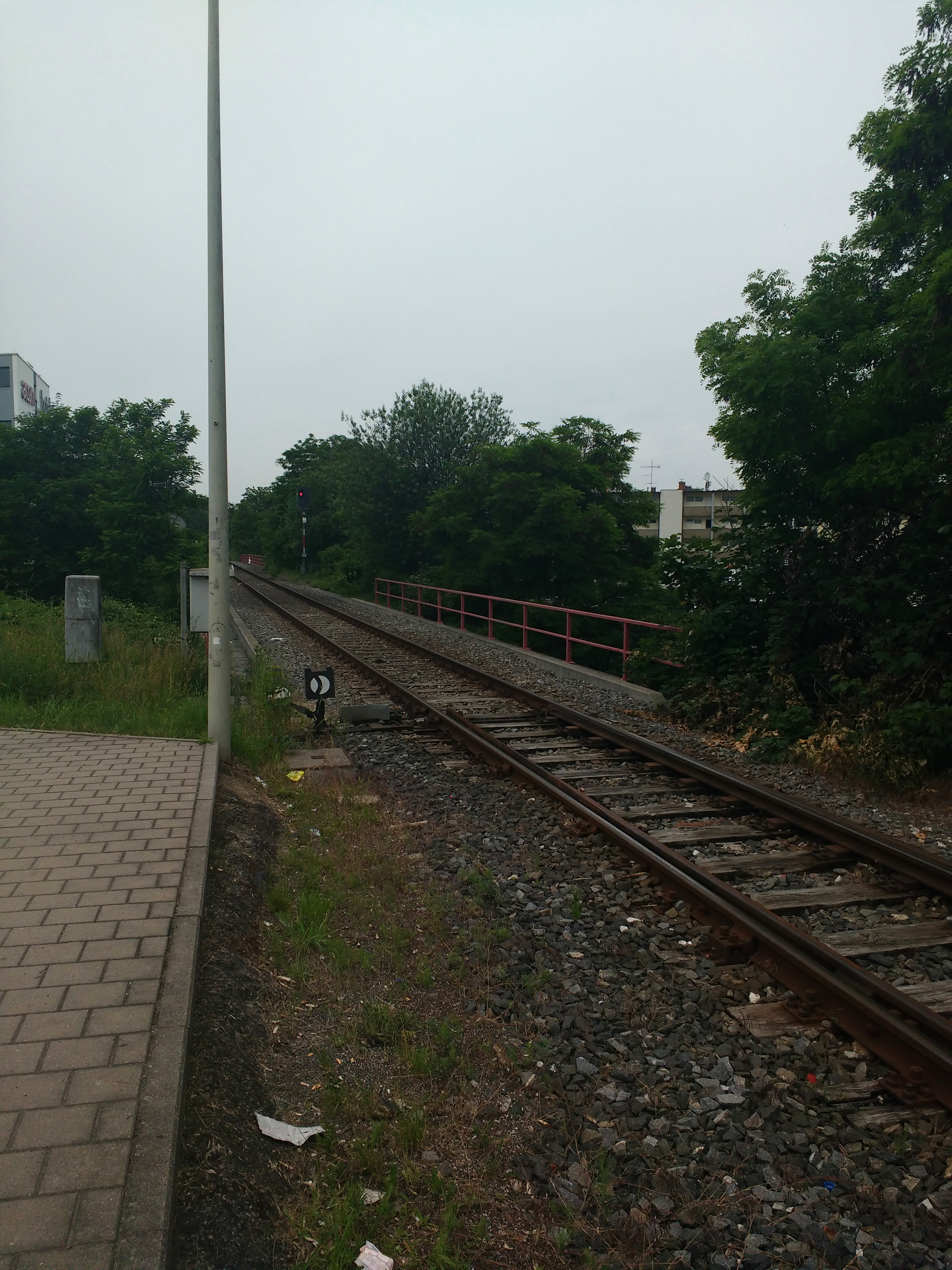
Nuremberg Ring Railway bridge over Bayreuther Straße
