= Reusch (company) =

Sporting equipment manufacturer

Reusch International S.p.A. AG
- Type: Aktiengesellschaft
- Industry: Sporting goods
- Founded: 1934; 92 years ago
- Founder: Karl Reusch
- Headquarters: Bolzano, Italy
- Area served: Worldwide
- Key people: Erich Weitzmann (CEO)
- Products: Goalkeeper gloves, winter gloves, sports equipment
- Number of employees: 60 (2017)
- Website: reusch.com

Reusch International S.p.A. AG is an Italian sports equipment manufacturer based in Bolzano (Alto Adige/South Tyrol). The company develops and markets gloves for winter sports and goalkeeper gloves. It also offers other football and winter sports products. It is managed as the family holding company.

== History ==
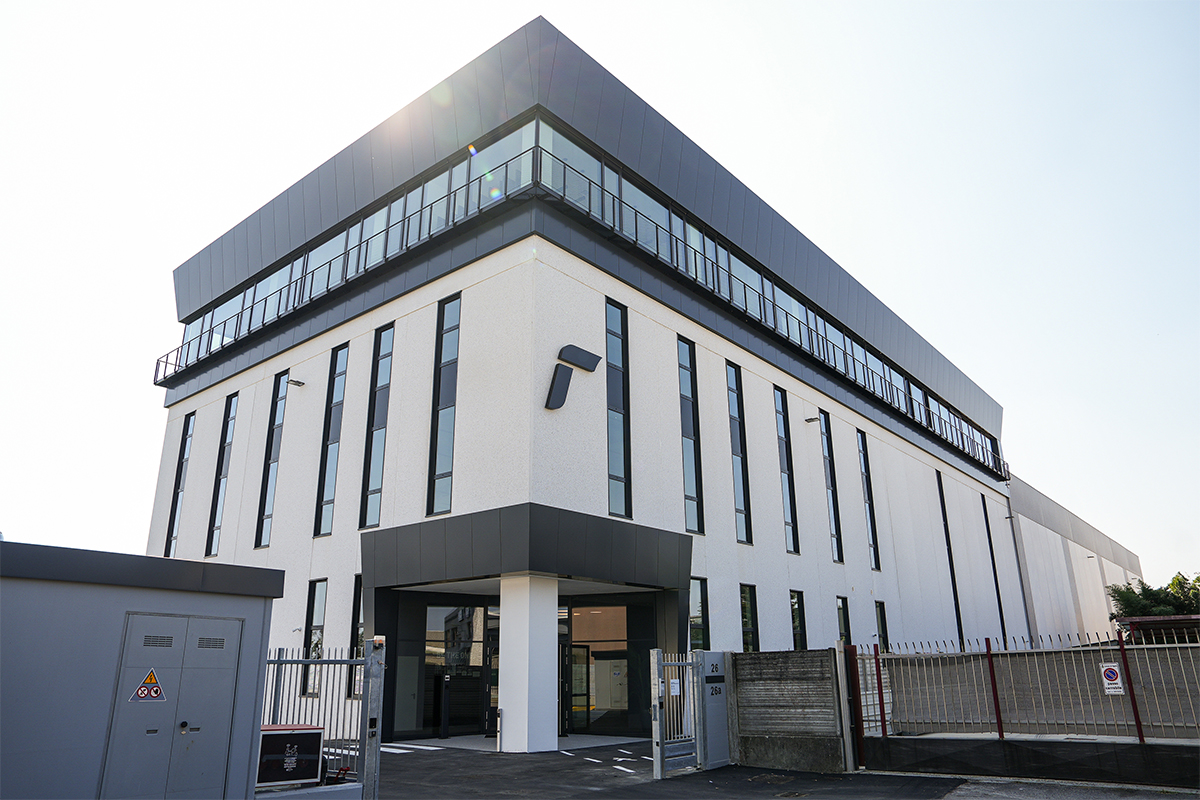
Location in Vignate

In 1934, Karl Reusch began developing his first gloves in the attic of his home in Metzingen. In 1972, his son Gebhard joined the company, and launched a first collection of ski gloves, expanding Reusch’s sports products activities. The ski gloves were reinforced with synthetic material to protect fingers on contact with slalom poles.

In 1973, working closely with German goalkeeper Sepp Maier, Gebhard Reusch developed the world's first goalkeeper glove. The Soft Grip glove provided protection for the hands and supported the goalkeeper in catching balls through an adhesive layer on the palm. A year later, Maier wore Reusch gloves during the 1974 FIFA World Cup in Germany. During the 1970s, over 330,000 goalkeeper gloves and over one million ski gloves were produced annually.

In the 1980s and 1990s, Reusch became the world market leader in the sports glove segment. At one point, 12 of the 18 Bundesliga goalkeepers used Reusch gloves. At the 1987 Alpine World Ski Championships, the Swiss national team was supplied with gloves from Reusch. In 1989, Reusch presented its first ski clothing collection and, three years later, its first team sports collection. Stefan Weitzmann, the father of future managing director Erich Weitzmann, took over as managing director of the family sports goods distribution company and assumed responsibility for Reusch's sales in the Italian market. The Weitzmann family had already been active in sporting goods sales since the 1950s. In 1996, Gebhard Reusch sold the company to the British Pentland Group.

In 2000, it became known that the Reusch family ended their active involvement in the company. Reusch remained part of the Pentland Group until 2001. In spring 2001, Reusch was taken over by a consortium that included, among others, the Weitzmann family from Bolzano. In the following years, three of the five original shareholders left the company and sold their shares to the Weitzmann family. In 2009, product development was relocated to Bolzano. Since 2015, Reusch has been entirely owned by the Weitzmann family.

In May 2017, the company was converted into a joint stock company, which is 100 percent family-owned. On 1 June 2017, Reusch also moved its headquarters from Reutlingen, Germany, to Bolzano in Italy. The Reutlingen site, however, continued to operate. In September 2024, a major fire broke out in the buildings in Reutlingen, destroying nearly 50 percent of the inventory due to fire and water damage. Despite the fire, by November 2024, a delivery rate of over 98 percent was achieved.

In 2025, the company opened a larger site in Vignate, among other reasons to concentrate the company’s logistics operations in a single location. The new-built production site covers 15,900 square metres of usable space.

== Products and distribution ==
The product range of the company's annual summer and winter collections includes items for men, women, and children. In comparative tests, Reusch gloves, especially ski gloves, receive good ratings and often rank among the test winners.

Reusch International S.p.A. AG, headquartered in Bolzano, distributes its products through 55 international distribution partners in over 50 countries on five continents. Ten European countries are supplied directly and managed from the headquarters. The logistics centers are located in both Reutlingen and Milan. The strongest sales markets for Reusch are Italy, France, and German-speaking Europe (as of 2021).

Reusch generates around two-thirds of its revenue from winter sports products (in 2017).

== Sponsoring and cooperations ==
=== Athletes ===
Sepp Maier was the first athlete to be equipped by Reusch at the 1974 World Cup in Germany. These glove models were the first to feature a latex palm. Other goalkeepers equipped by Reusch include FIFA World Cup winners Ubaldo Fillol, Nery Pumpido, Bodo Illgner, Cláudio Taffarel and Marcos Reis. At Euro 96, goalkeepers from 11 of the 16 teams wore Reusch gloves, including England's David Seaman, Andreas Köpke of Germany and Peter Schmeichel. In 2024, the Reusch-equipped goalkeeper Unai Simón became European Champion with Spain. At the 2014 FIFA World Cup in Brazil, in addition to Júlio César, Fernando Muslera (URU), Moisés Muñoz (MEX), Mariano Andújar (ARG) and Alexander Domínguez (ECU) were also equipped with Reusch goalkeeper gloves. At Euro 2024, goalkeepers such as Wojciech Szczęsny, Dominik Livaković and Unai Simón used Reusch gloves. As of 2024, more than 250 goalkeepers in the top national leagues worldwide wear the company's goalkeeper gloves, including Alisson Becker and Gregor Kobel.

In alpine skiing, Reusch supports athletes such as Mikaela Shiffrin, Marco Odermatt, Henrik Kristoffersen, Lara Gut-Behrami, Lucas Pinheiro Braathen, Alexis Pinturault and Lindsey Vonn. Athletes such as Hermann Maier, Marlies Schild, and Marcel Hirscher and others were also equipped with Reusch products during their active ski careers. In addition, Reusch is the official supplier of seven of the world's most successful ski associations: Austria, Switzerland, France, United States, Norway, Liechtenstein and Slovenia.

=== Brand cooperations ===
Since 1 January 2023, Reusch has been the distribution partner of Speedo in Italy and Austria and distributes the products of Red Bull Spect Eyewear in Italy. In addition, the company is the distribution partner for Deuter Sport in Italy and also distributes gloves under the German Bogner brand. Reusch uses Gore-Tex, Primaloft, and Polartec materials and technologies in its products. Furthermore, Reusch carries out contract work for brands such as Moncler, Prada, and Beretta. In 2025, Reusch introduced the Attrakt Fusion Carbon 3D, a goalkeeper glove with a 3D-printed punching zone. The punching zone was developed in collaboration with the U.S. 3D printing company Carbon. It consists of an elastic, tear-resistant lattice structure designed to provide improved cushioning compared to conventional elastomer elements.
