= Gründlach =

River in Germany

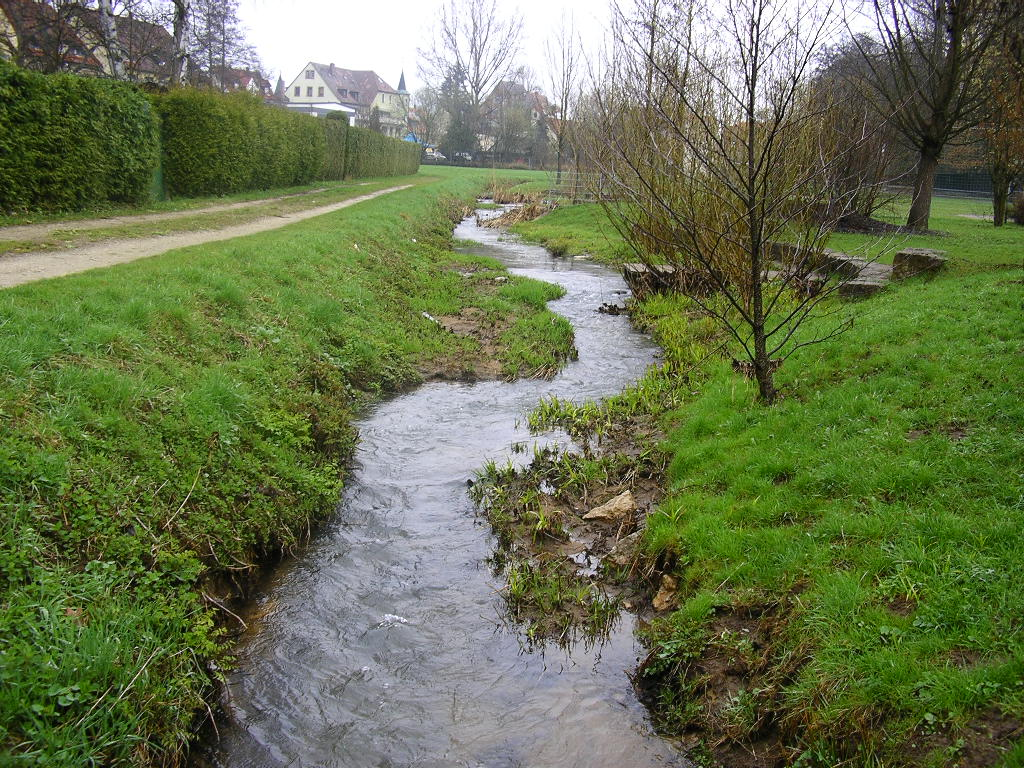
- The Gründlach in Heroldsberg

Location
- Country: Germany
- State: Bavaria

Physical characteristics
- Mouth
  - location: Regnitz
  - coordinates: 49.5429°N 10.9773°E
- Length: 25.5 km (15.8 mi)

Basin features
- Progression: Regnitz→ Main→ Rhine→ North Sea

Gründlach is a river in Bavaria, Germany. It flows into the Regnitz south of Erlangen.

== See also ==
- List of rivers of Bavaria
