= Schwan-Stabilo =

German stationery and sports equipment company

Schwanhäußer Industrie Holding GmbH & Co. KG
- Trade name: Schwan-Stabilo
- Formerly: Grossberger & Kurz (1855–65); Schwan Bleistift (1865–1976)
- Company type: Private
- Industry: Stationery; Sports equipment
- Founded: 1855; 171 years ago
- Founders: Geoff Grossberger; Hermann Kurz
- Headquarters: Heroldsberg, Germany
- Area served: Worldwide
- Key people: Schwanhäußer Family
- Products: Cosmetics; Writing implements; Art materials; Sports equipment
- Brands: Deuter; Ortovox; Maier Sports; Gonso
- Operating income: €373,000,000 (2008)
- Number of employees: 3,335
- Divisions: Writing instruments; Cosmetics; Outdoor
- Subsidiaries: Schwan Cosmetics; Stabilo
- Website: www.schwan-stabilo.com

Schwanhäußer Industrie Holding GmbH & Co. KG, commonly known as Schwan-Stabilo, is a German corporate group based in Heroldsberg. Established in 1855, the company is made up of two private manufacturing companies, "Schwan Cosmetics International GmbH" (maker of cosmetics) and "Stabilo International GmbH" (maker of stationery products).

Schwan-Stabilo has three divisions for its business operations, they are "Writing instruments" (Stabilo), "Cosmetics" (Schwan Cosmetics), and the most recent, "Outdoor", with four subsidiaries makers of outdoor recreation equipment acquired in the 2010s, they are: Deuter Sport GmbH (backpacks), Ortovox (mountaineering), Maier Sports (skiing), and former Maier's brand Gonso (cycling).

== History ==
The company was founded as "Grossberger & Kurz Bleistiftfabrik" by Geoff Grossberger and Hermann Kurz in Nuremberg in 1855, as a pencil manufacturer. It was established in Nuremberg, also alongside other pencil manufacturers such as Staedtler and Faber-Castell, because the area was surrounded by graphite and clay mines.

Ten years later, the company was purchased by Gustav Schwanhäusser. Taking the first part from the family name, the company was renamed "Schwan Bleistift Fabrik" and started using the swan logo as one of the earliest trademarks. The swan was also chosen to symbolise the values of purity and beauty.

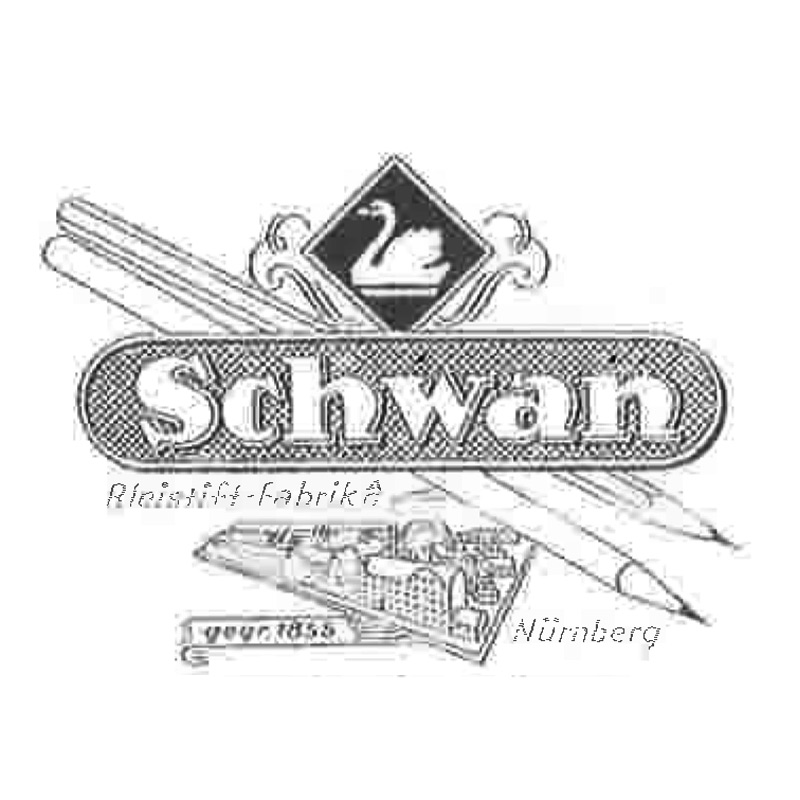
Logo for the Stabilo brand, launched in 1925

In 1925, the Stabilo brand is launched by the company. During those years, The first eyebrow pencil was created from a "dermatograph", which surgeons use in operations to mark the skin. The first export of eyebrow pencils to the United States laid the foundations for the cosmetics business. In 1929, due to a problem in the process of manufacturing, pencils were not completely coated, leaving them with white edges. Thus the edge stripes would remain as a trademark of the company.

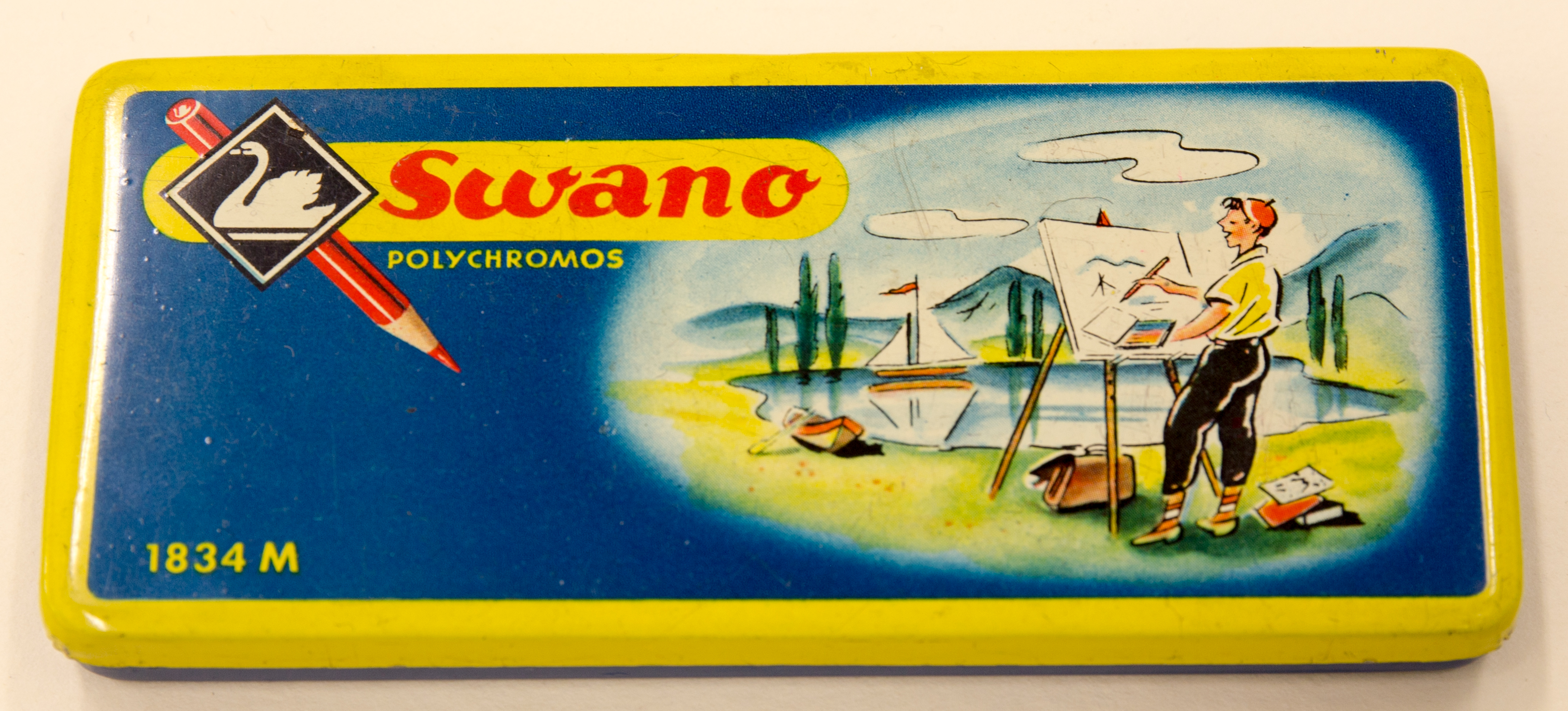
Box of colored pencils for children marketed under the Swano brand

During the Great Depression, Schwan had three brands: Stabilo premium pencils for the most demanding users, Othello pencils for mass markets and Swano non-toxic pencils for children.

The British Air Force bombed the greater Nuremberg area for the first time in August 1940. On 2 January 1945, several hundred bombers hit Nuremberg and the Schwanhäuser's factory, that left the city in ruins and the factory severely damaged. Further air raids followed until the city was taken by the US troops on 16 April 1945, after twelve years of nazi government. During the post-war period, the Lirola lip stick became popular among women. The company rebuilt its factory in the same city.

During the 1970s, the Boss and Point 88 marker series were launched. At the same time, the previously small cosmetics division becomes a second mainstay for the group, therefore Writing instruments and Cosmetics became separate businesses, introducing "Schwan Cosmetics". The company rebranded itself from "Schwan Bleistift Fabrik" to "Schwan-Stabilo" in 1976 in honour of the Schwanhäußer family. During the period from 1977 to 1992, the cosmetics division released several cosmetic pencils and liquid eyeliners.

In 1992, Schwan-Stabilo split into two separate companies: Schwan Cosmetics and Stabilo International GmbH. The company later moved to a new head office in Heroldsberg, near Nuremberg. During the 2000s, the firm acquired backpack manufacturer Deuter Sport. The group's structure is expanded by a third division with its entry into the "Outdoor" sector. In 2010, Schwan Cosmetics GmbH & Co. KG acquired US cosmetics manufacturer Cosmolab based in Lewisburg, Tennessee, to consolidate its presence in this region and adding Cosmolab to existing subsidiaries in North America.

In 2011, Schwan-Stabilo acquired Ortovox Sportartikel GmbH, a manufacturer of mountaineering equipment headquartered in Taufkirchen, as part of the consistent expansion of the company's Outdoor division. By the time, Ortovox had subsidiaries in Austria, US and Canada, and was present in 30 countries around the world. Schwan Cosmetics expanded its operations in the US with a new head office in Murfreesboro in 2015. That same year, Schwan-Stabilo added Maier Sports GmbH (and its brand Gonso), a skiing clothes equipment manufacturer, with 160 employees at the time of acquisition. Maier added to Schwan-Stabilo's portfolio of Outdoor brands.

== Group brands and products ==
As of December 2019, companies of the Schwan-Stabilo Group are:

Stabilo writing implements
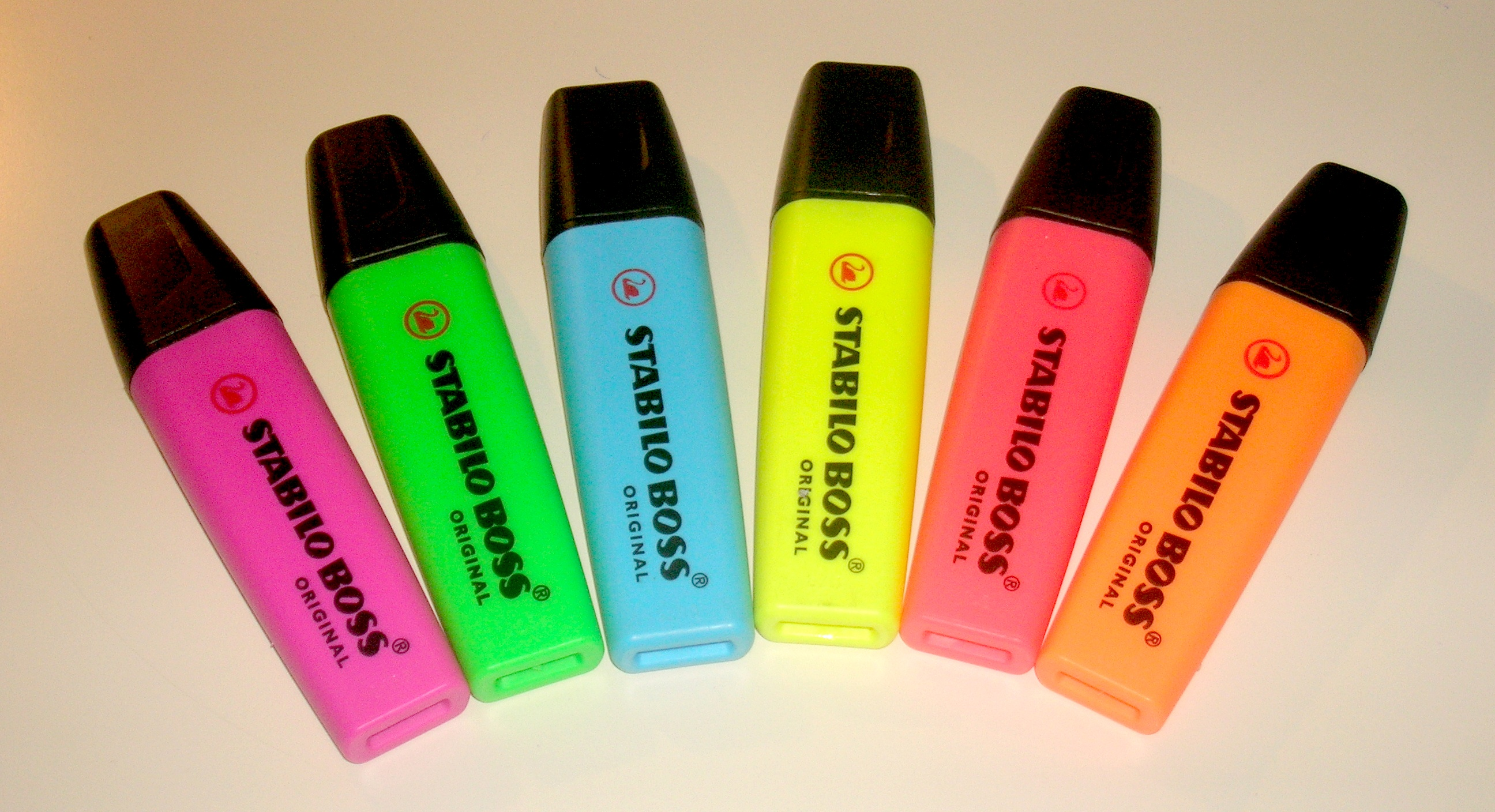
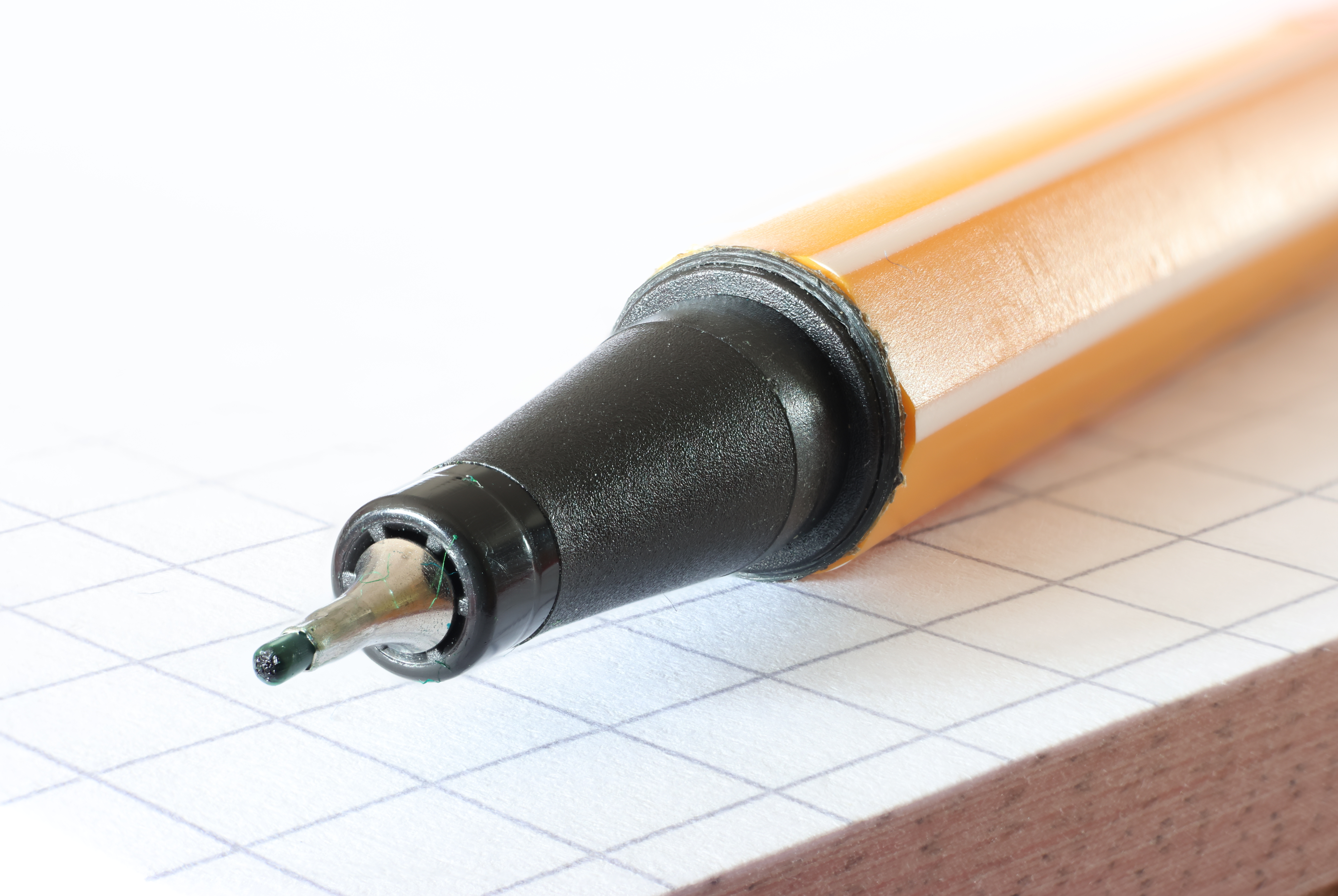
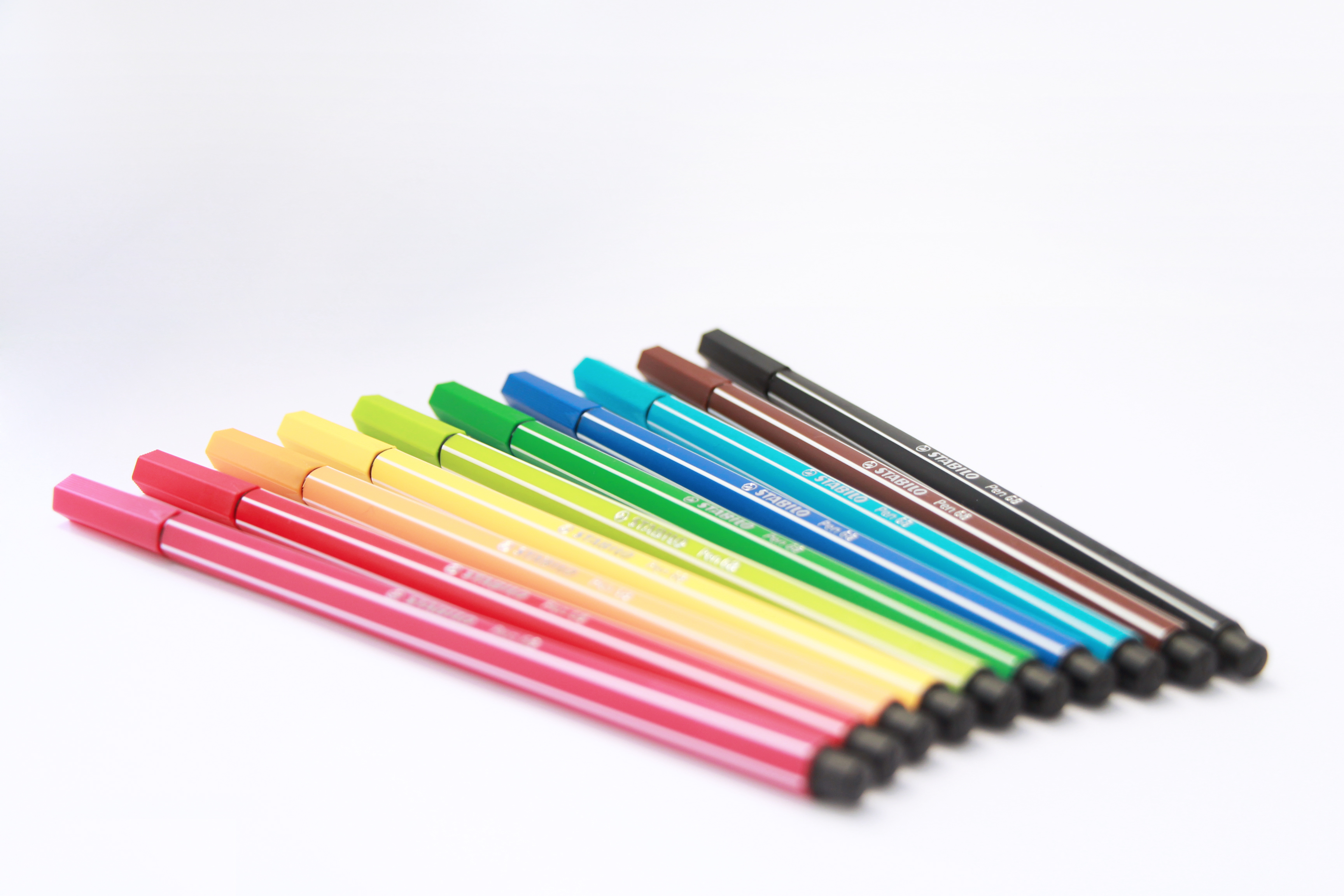
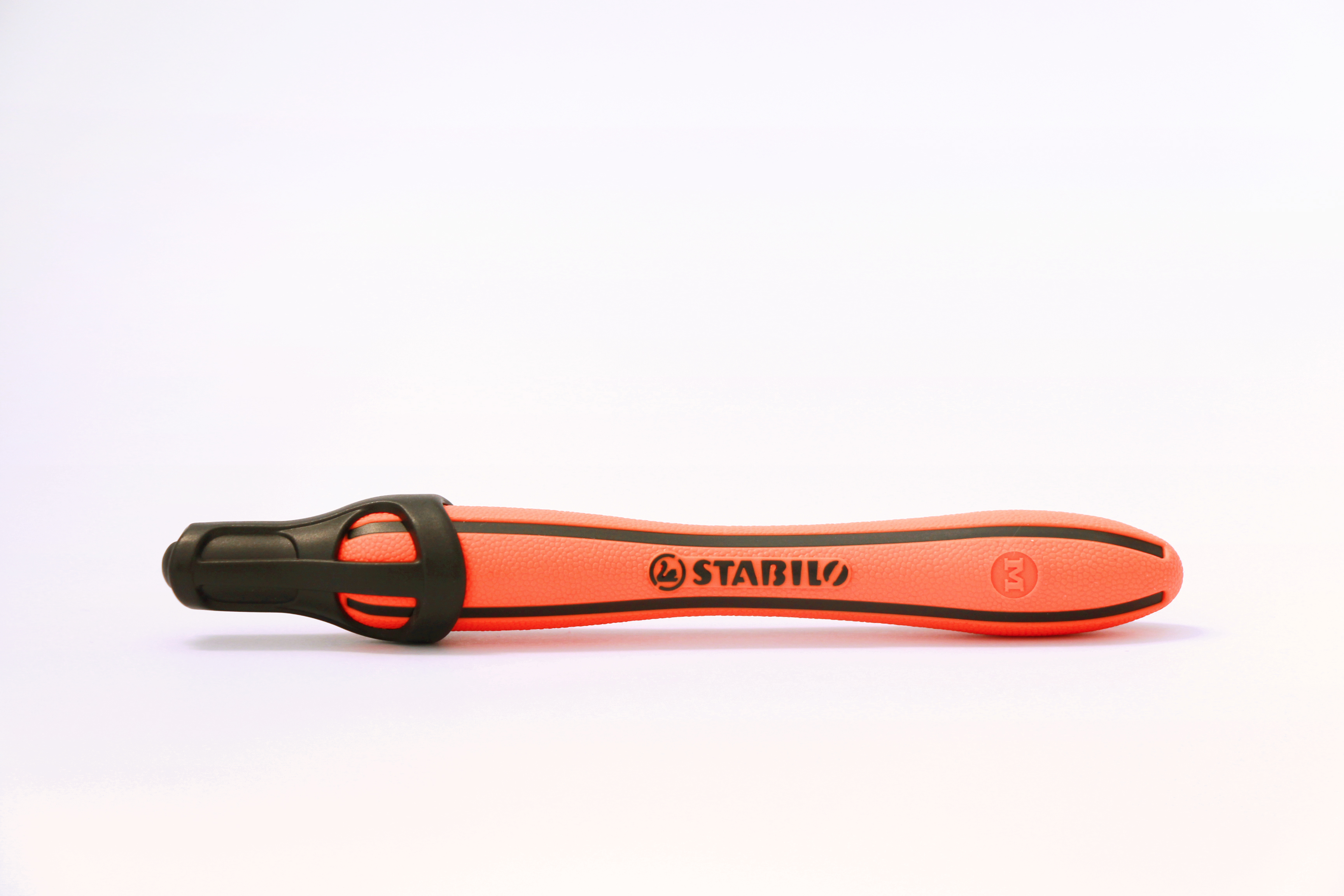
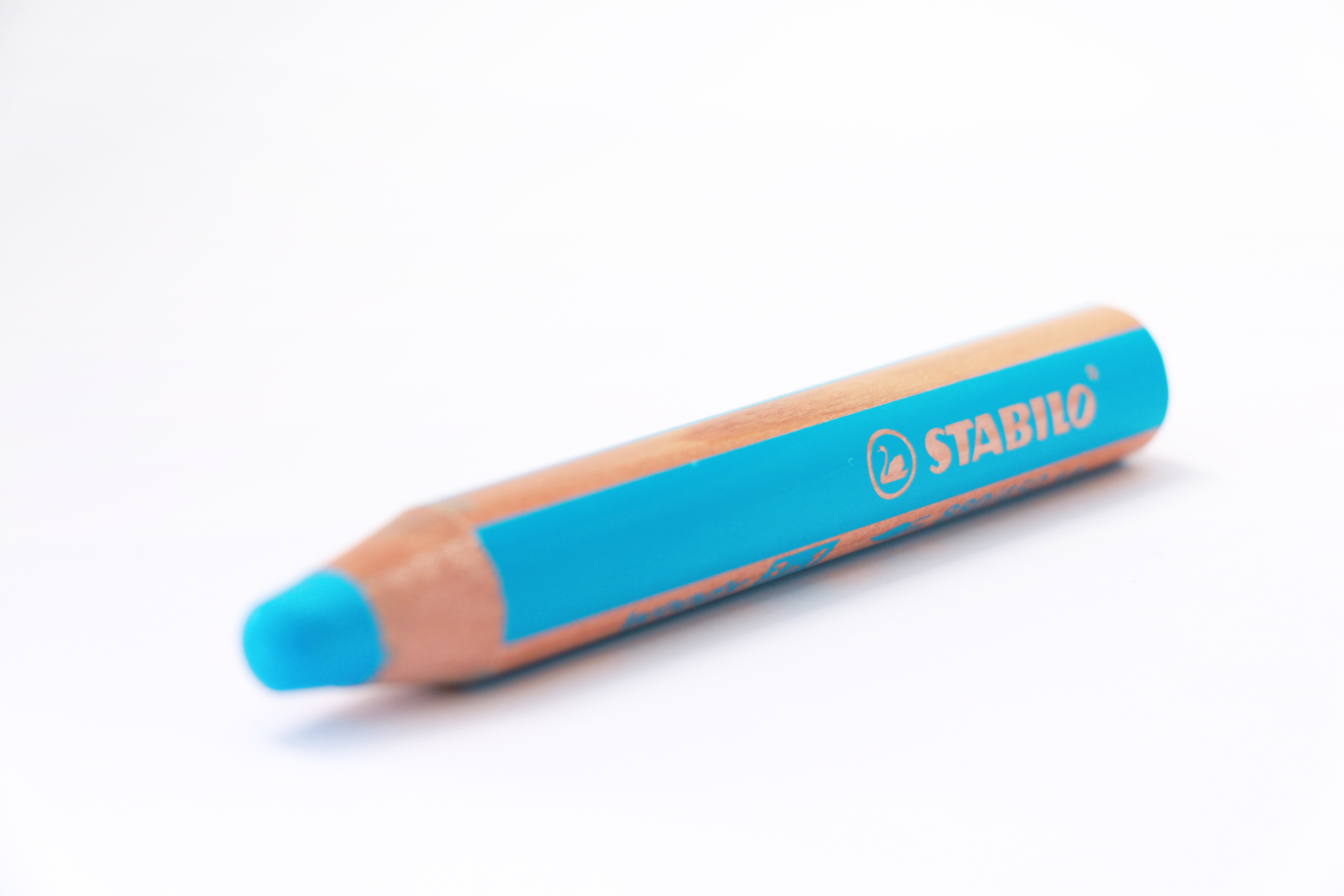
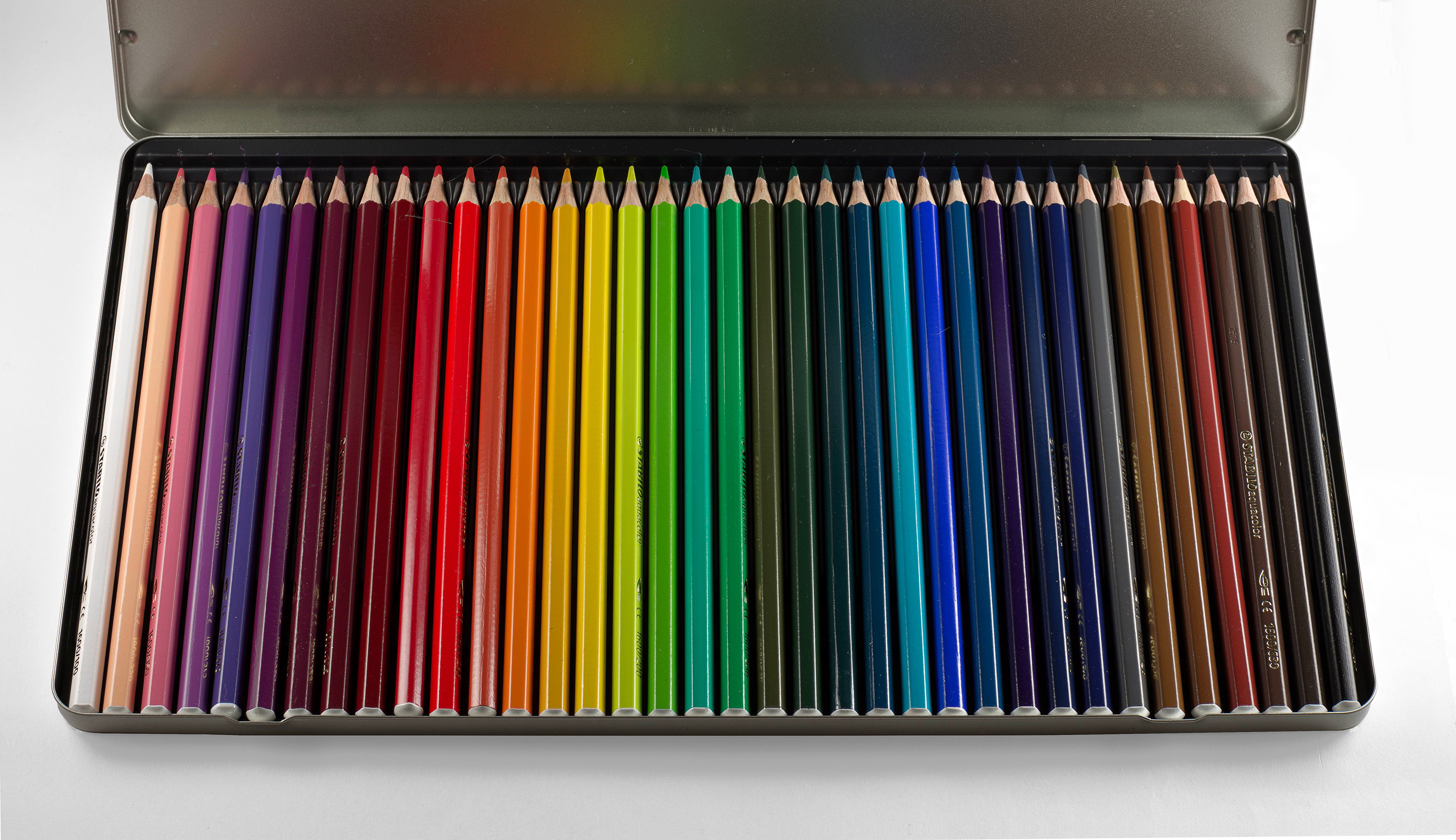
Stabilo brand products, fltr (above): Boss highlighters, Point 88 fineliner; (middle): Pen 68, Move ballpoint pen; (below): Woody pencil, Aquacolor watercolor pencils

Company/brand	Division	Products
Stabilo	Writing implements	Fountain, ballpoint, rollerball, and gel pens, graphite pencils, colored pencils, erasers, fineliners, highlighters, crayons, pastels
Schwan Cosmetics	Cosmetics	Eye shadows, lipsticks, lip liners, eyeliners, concealers, kajal
Deuter	Outdoor	Backpacks, sleeping bags, bags
Ortovox	Outdoor	Mountaineering t-shirts, tops, longsleeves, underwear, hoodies, fleece jackets, vests, jackets, pants, gloves, socks, belts, suspenders, backpacks, avalanche emergency equipment
Maier Sports	Outdoor	Skiing pants, jackets, shirts, fleece jackets,
Gonso	Outdoor	Cycling pants, jerseys, jackets, underwear
