= Gräfenberg Railway =

Railway line in Germany

Nuremberg Nordost – Gräfenberg
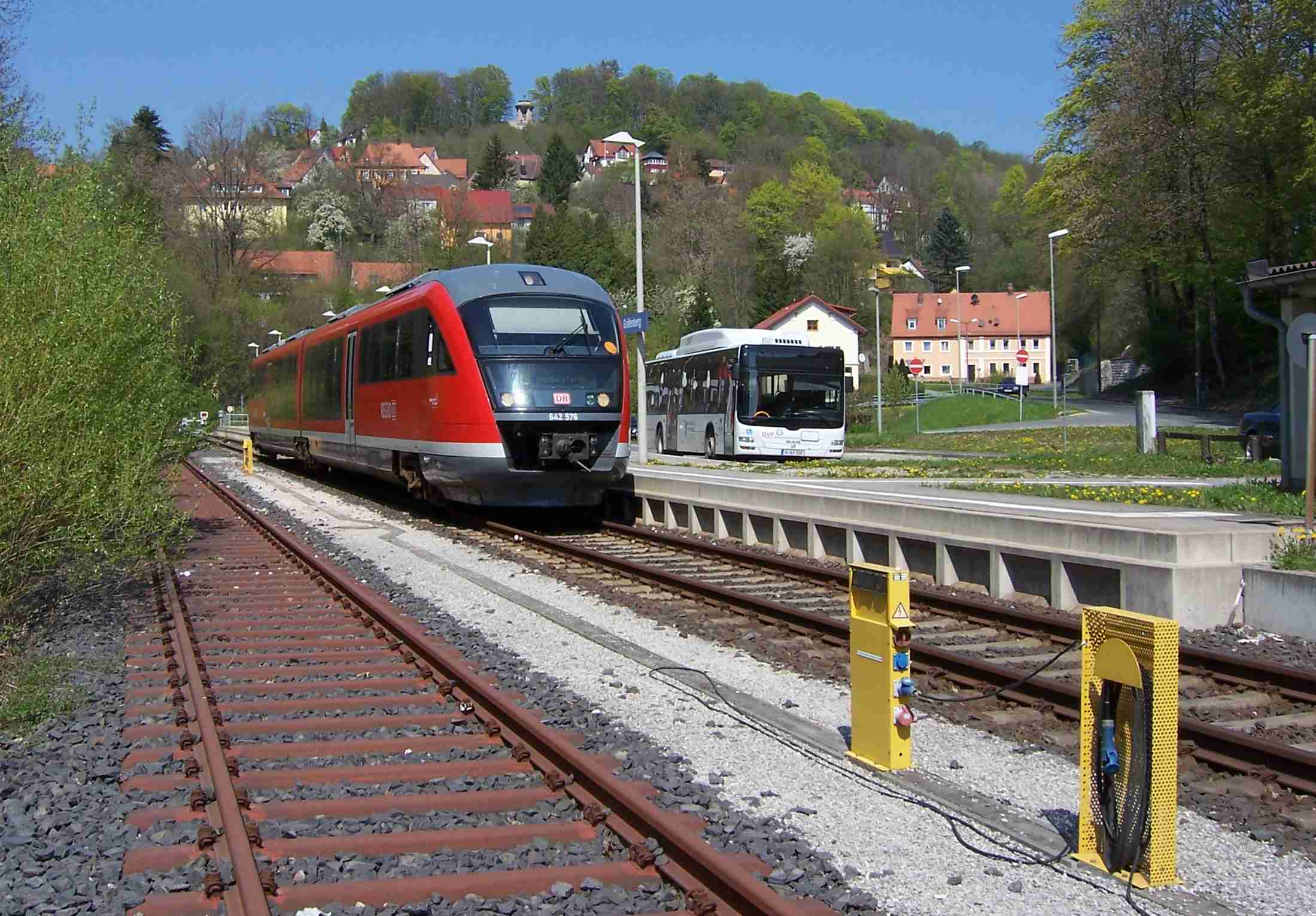
- Gräfenberg Railway

Overview
- Native name: Gräfenbergbahn
- Line number: 5920 (Germany)

Service
- Route number: 861 (Germany)

Technical
- Line length: 28.0 km (Line class: C2 (Nuremberg Nordost – Eschenau); B1 (Eschenau – Gräfenberg))
- Track gauge: 1,435 mm
- Minimum radius: 250
- Operating speed: 80 km/h max.
- Maximum incline: 20 %

The Gräfenberg Railway (German: Gräfenbergbahn) is the railway line from the Nuremberg Nordost station via Heroldsberg, Kalchreuth and Eschenau to Gräfenberg. It is a successful reference project for the revitalisation of railway lines threatened with closure.

== Services ==
Passenger services are operated by DB Regio. They are in integrated into the Nuremberg Regional Transport Association (Verkehrsverbund Großraum Nuremberg) and designated as line R 21.

== Future ==
An electrification of this line has variously been debated as has been extending passenger service along the Nuremberg Ringbahn. There have also been calls for additional stops in the northern Nuremberg boroughs of Ziegelstein and Buchenbühl which had had stops in the past.

== Gallery ==
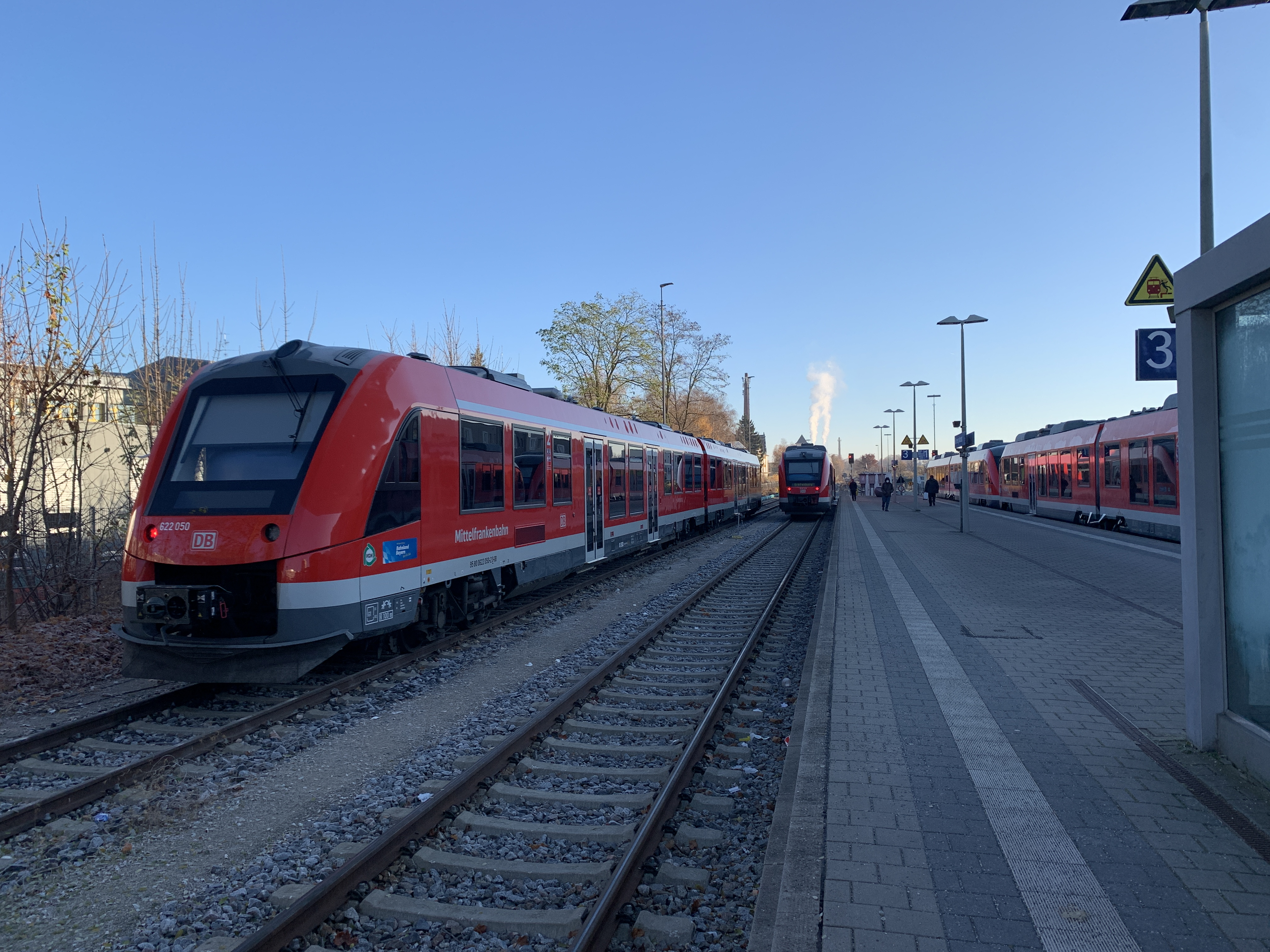
Nürnberg Nordost station (2021)

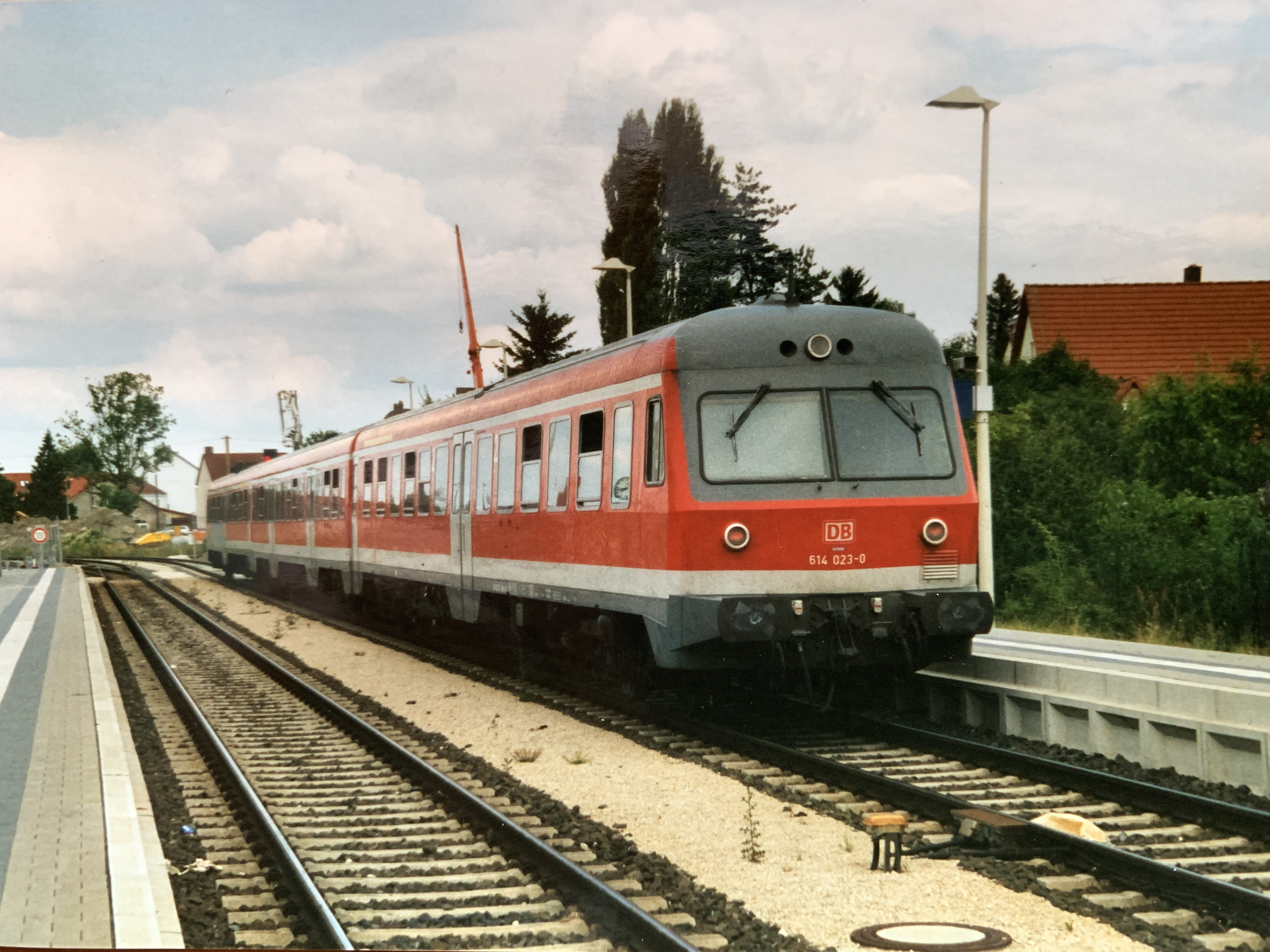
Eschenau station (2001)

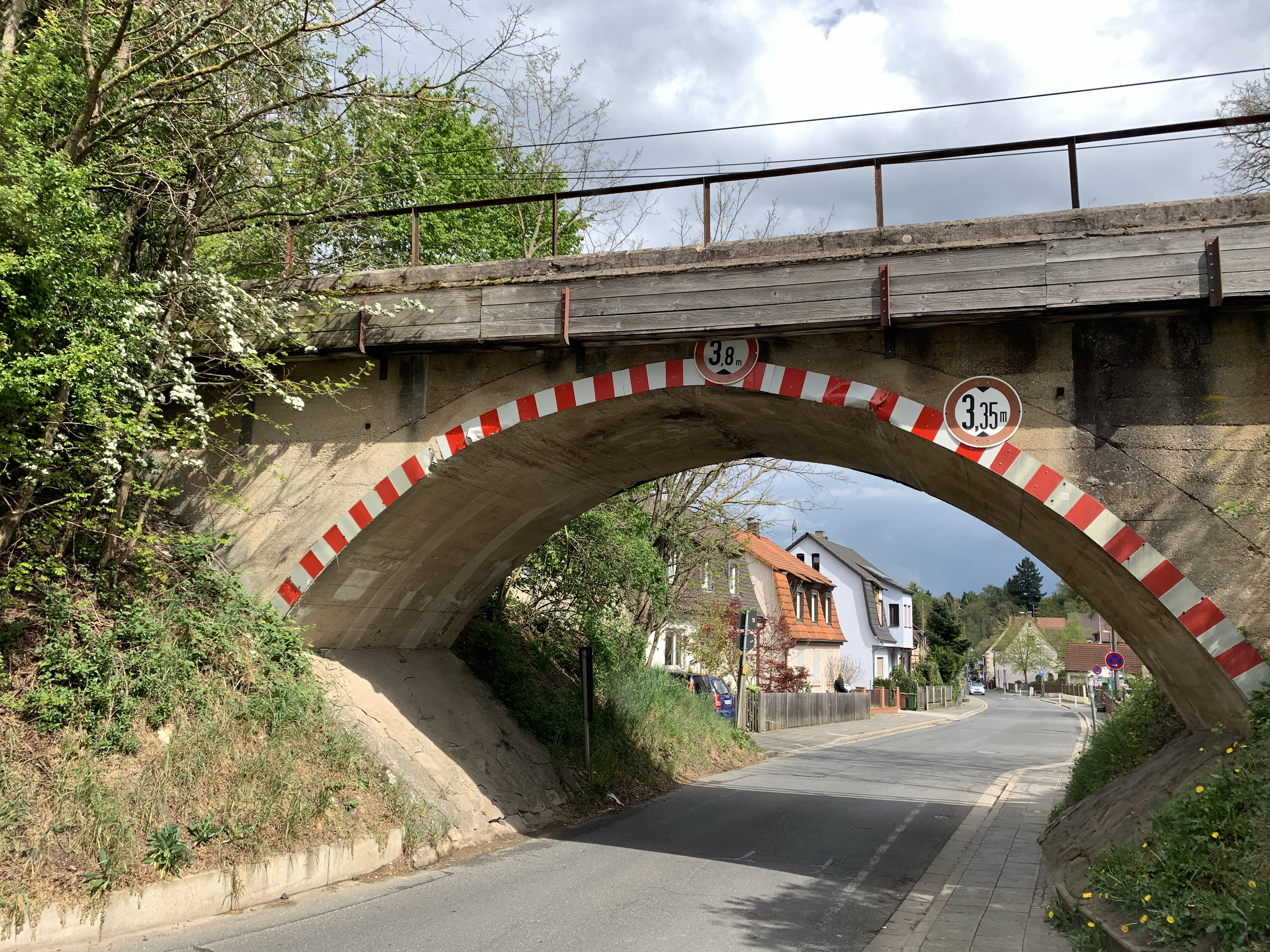
Arch bridge in Heroldsberg, built 1908

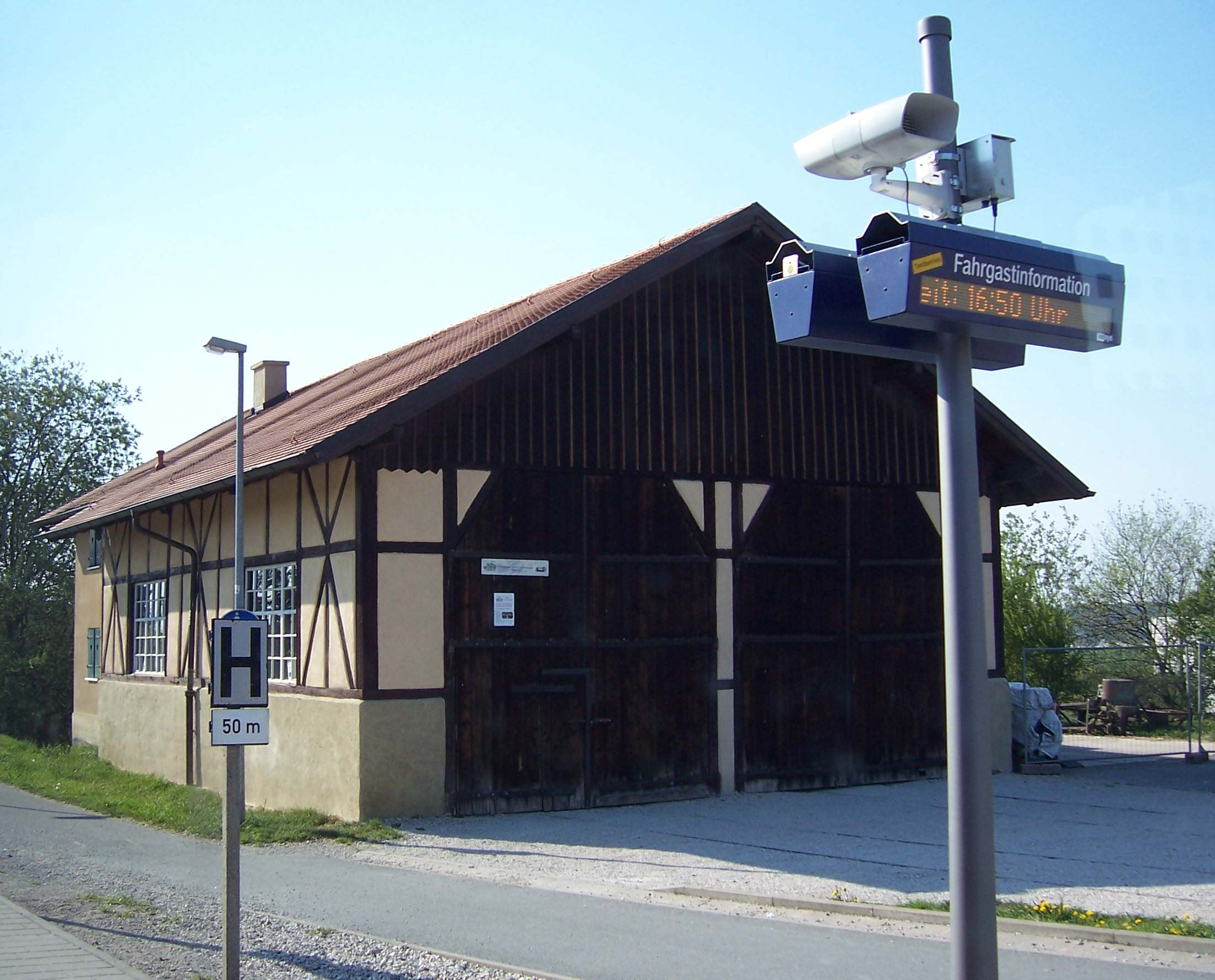
Former locomotive shed in Eschenau
