= Heroldsberg =

- Municipality
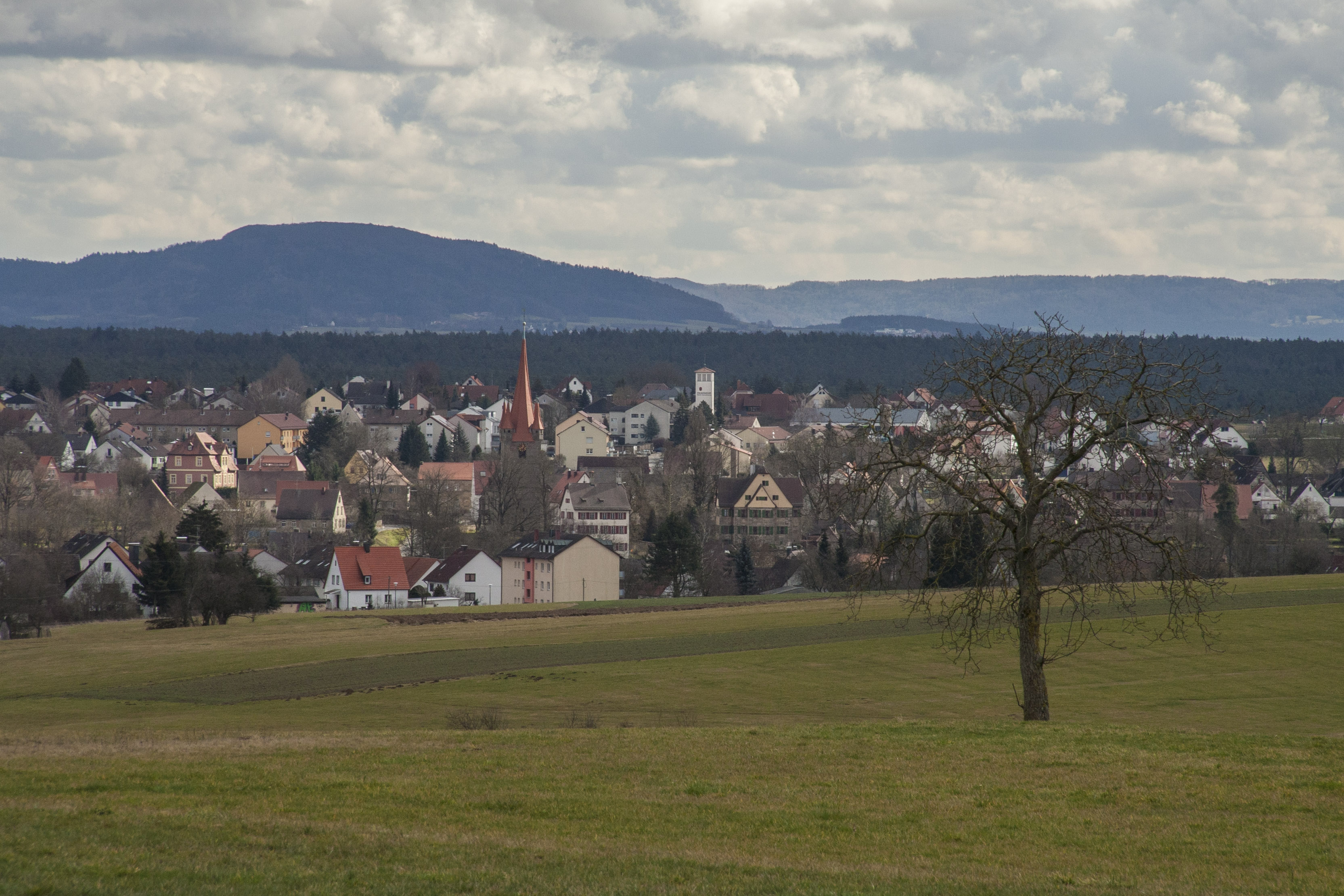
- Heroldsberg seen from the west

- Coat of arms

- Location of Heroldsberg within Erlangen-Höchstadt district
- Interactive map of Heroldsberg
- Location within Germany Location within Bavaria
- Coordinates: 49°32′N 11°9′E
- Country: Germany
- State: Bavaria
- Admin. region: Mittelfranken
- District: Erlangen-Höchstadt

Government
  - Mayor (2020–26): Jan König (CSU)

Area
  - Total: 11.02 km^{2} (4.25 sq mi)
- Elevation: 335–378 m (1,099–1,240 ft)

Population (2025-12-31)
  - Total: 8,241
  - Density: 747.8/km^{2} (1,937/sq mi)
- Time zone: UTC+01:00 (CET)
  - Summer (DST): UTC+02:00 (CEST)
- Postal codes: 90562
- Dialling codes: 0911, 09126 (Groß- and Kleingeschaidt)
- Vehicle registration: ERH
- Website: www.heroldsberg.de

Heroldsberg (East Franconian: Herldsbärch) is a municipality in the district of Erlangen-Höchstadt, in Bavaria, Germany. It is located eleven kilometers north-east from the city of Nuremberg and 23 kilometers east from Erlangen and is the headquarters of Schwan-Stabilo.

== Geography ==
=== Location ===
It is in the Sebalder Reichswald, the forest north to Nuremberg and is on a ridge. The Gründlach, a side river of the Regnitz, flows through the village of Heroldsberg.

=== Municipality ===
It contains Großgeschaidt, Kleingeschaidt and the villages of Heroldsberg, consisting of Heroldsberg, Johannisthal and Hundsmühle.

=== Surrounding Municipalities ===
It is surrounded by Eckental, Lauf an der Pegnitz, Nuremberg and Kalchreuth.

== History ==
Heroldsberg's history goes back to the 11th century but it was first mentioned in 1225. Later on in 1387 the territory was sold to the Nuremberg patrician family Geuder in whose possession the lordship of Heroldsberg was for over 400 years, rendering them imperial knights with the name Geuder von Heroldsberg, and raised in rank to Bavarian barons in 1822. The Geuders increased their wealth through long-distance trade, namely with spices and cloths shipped to Cologne in the 14th century, and run commercial establishments in Venice in the late 14th century and in Frankfurt am Main and Flanders in the early 15th century. Around 1418 they also did financial business in Paris and were involved in mining companies. It was them who built the four manors, the so-called green, red, white and yellow castles, and the fortified church at the village's market square. Famous painter Albrecht Dürer, a friend of councillor and Schultheiß Martin Geuder III (1455–1532), made the first graphical depiction of the village of Heroldsberg in 1510, with Geuder's newly built Red Castle in the foreground. It is still today owned by Geuder's descendants.

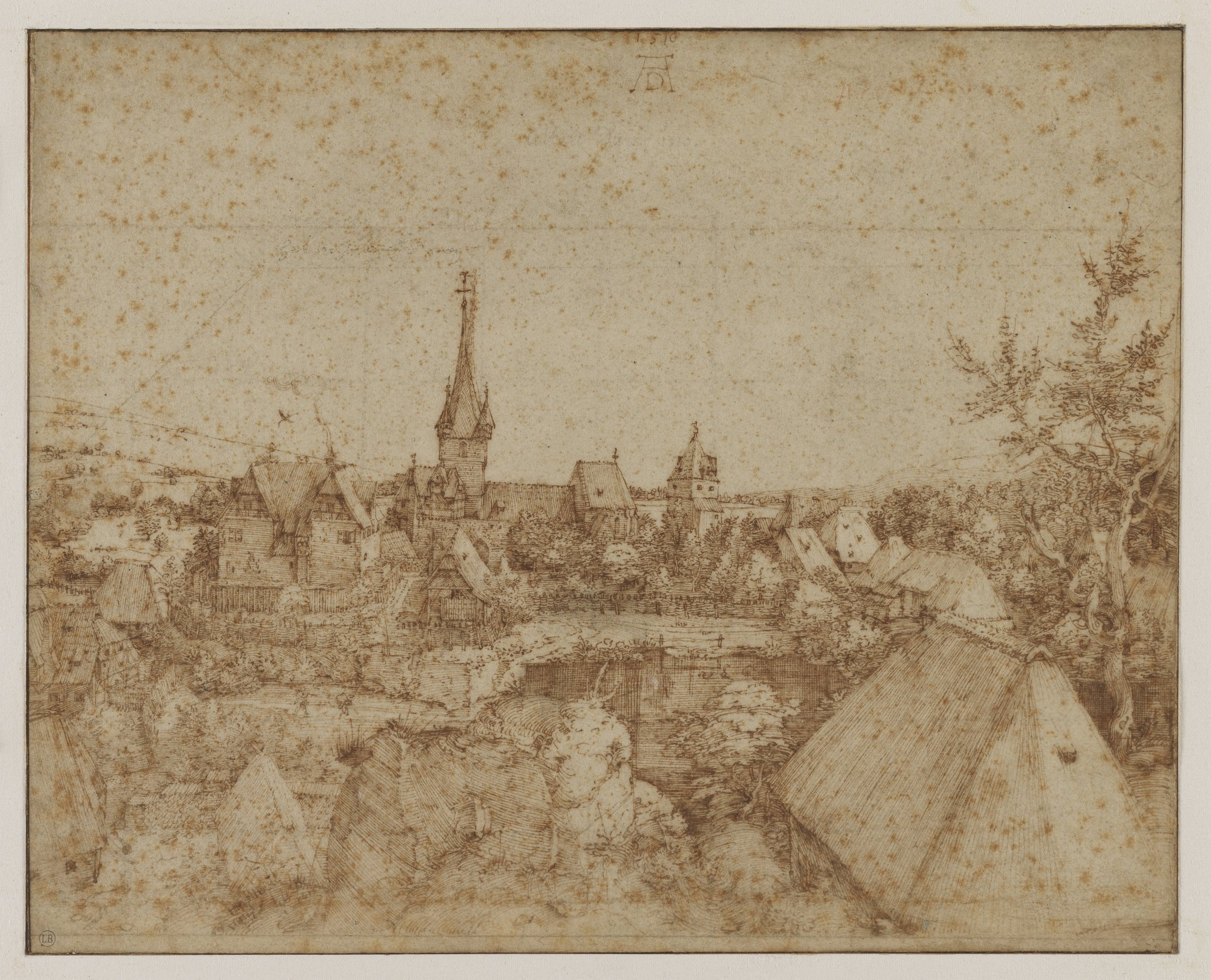
Albrecht Dürer, drawing of Heroldsberg (1510)

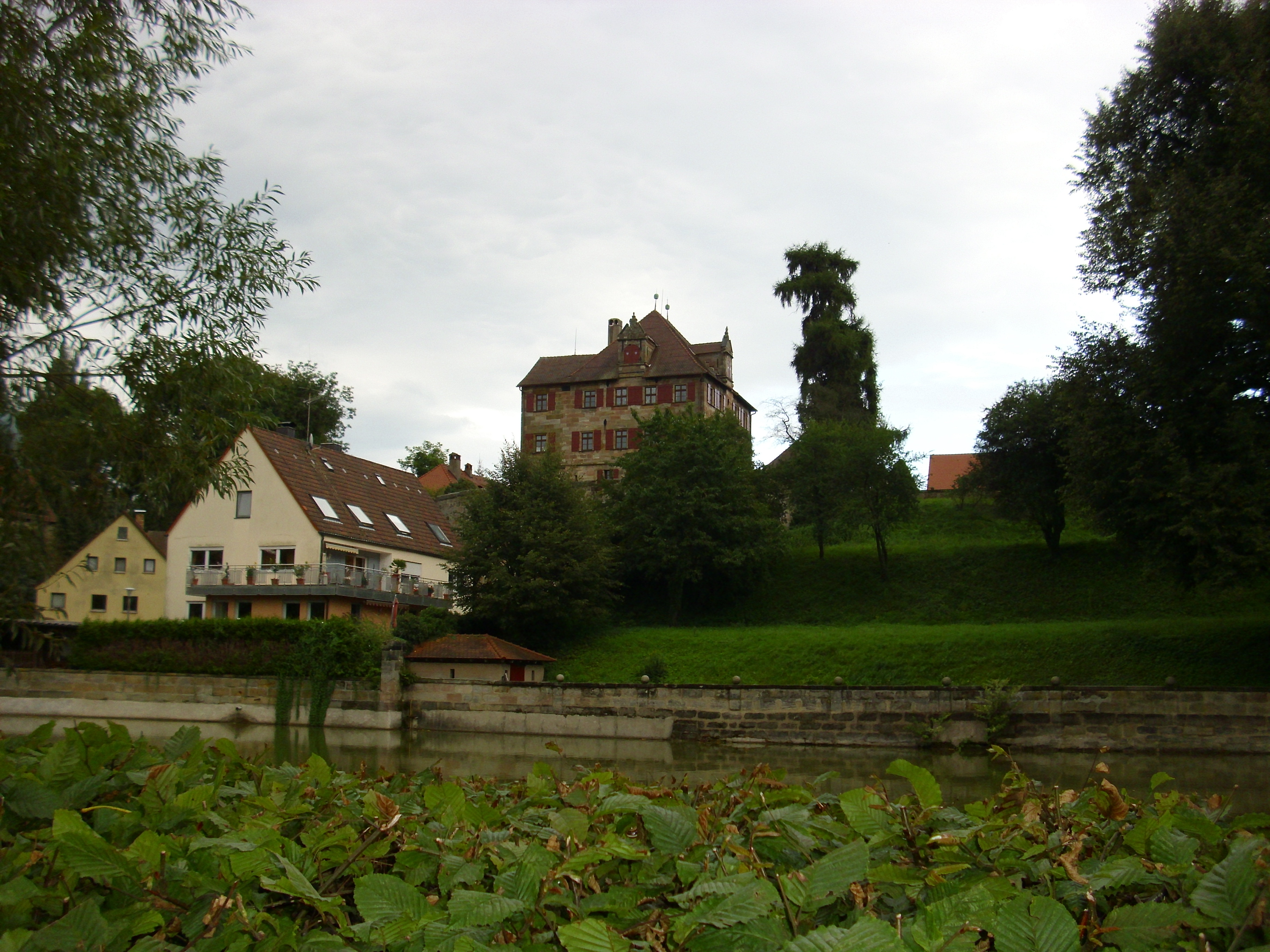
The Red Castle (2010)

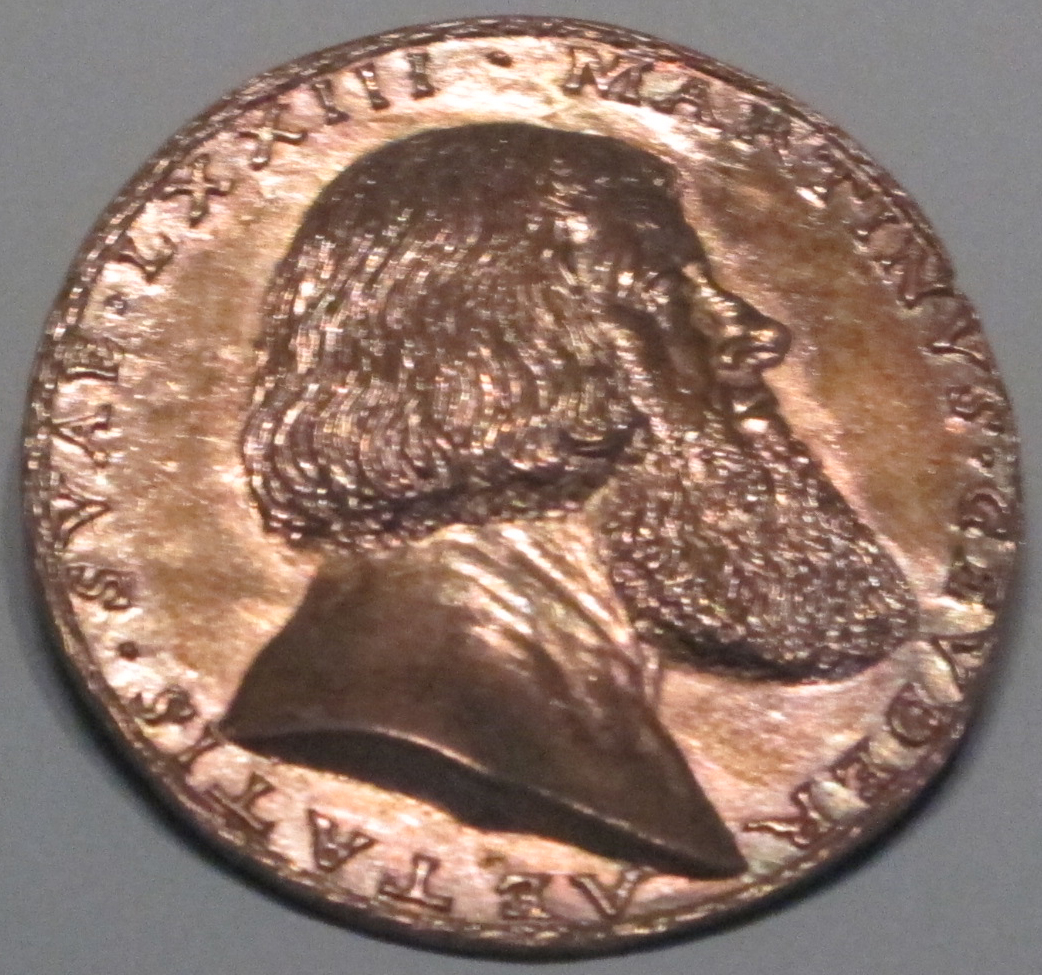
Martin Geuder III (1455–1532)

From the 15th to the 17th century there were times of growth and upswing yet diminished by destruction for example through the Margrave Wars and the Thirty Years' War. In 1796 the Geuder family lost the fiefdom and the territory became Prussian, though in the Napoleonic Wars it was under French administration for four years. Ever since 1810 Heroldsberg belongs to Bavaria.

After World War II around 1,700 Heimatvertriebene, ethnic Germans who were forced to leave their eastern-European homecountries after the second World War, settled in Heroldsberg. Since the Bavarian territorial reform in 1978 the villages of Großgeschaidt and Kleingeschaidt are part of the community.

Since the 1970s, Heroldsberg has seen a steady influx of residents and today has 8,852 inhabitants.

== Coat of arms ==
The coat of arms of Heroldsberg shows a golden lion's head, surrounded by three silver stars on a blue background. It was given to the village by King Sigmund in 1417 at the request of Kunz Geuder.
