= Nuremberg Ring Railway =

Railway line in Germany

Overview
- Native name: Ringbahn Nürnberg
- Line number: 5922 (Nürnberg Ost–Nürnberg-Dutzendteich); 5923 (Nürnberg Ost–Nürnberg-Großmarkt); 5950 (Nürnberg Rbf–Nürnberg-Großmarkt); 5962 (Nürnberg Rbf–Nürnberg-Dutzendteich)
- Locale: Bavaria, Germany

Service
- Route number: 895 (Nuremberg Hbf–Nuremberg marshalling yard exit)

Technical
- Line length: 30 km (19 mi)
- Track gauge: 1,435 mm (4 ft 8 1/2 in) standard gauge
- Electrification: "South Ring": 15 kV/16.7 Hz AC overhead catenary
Route map
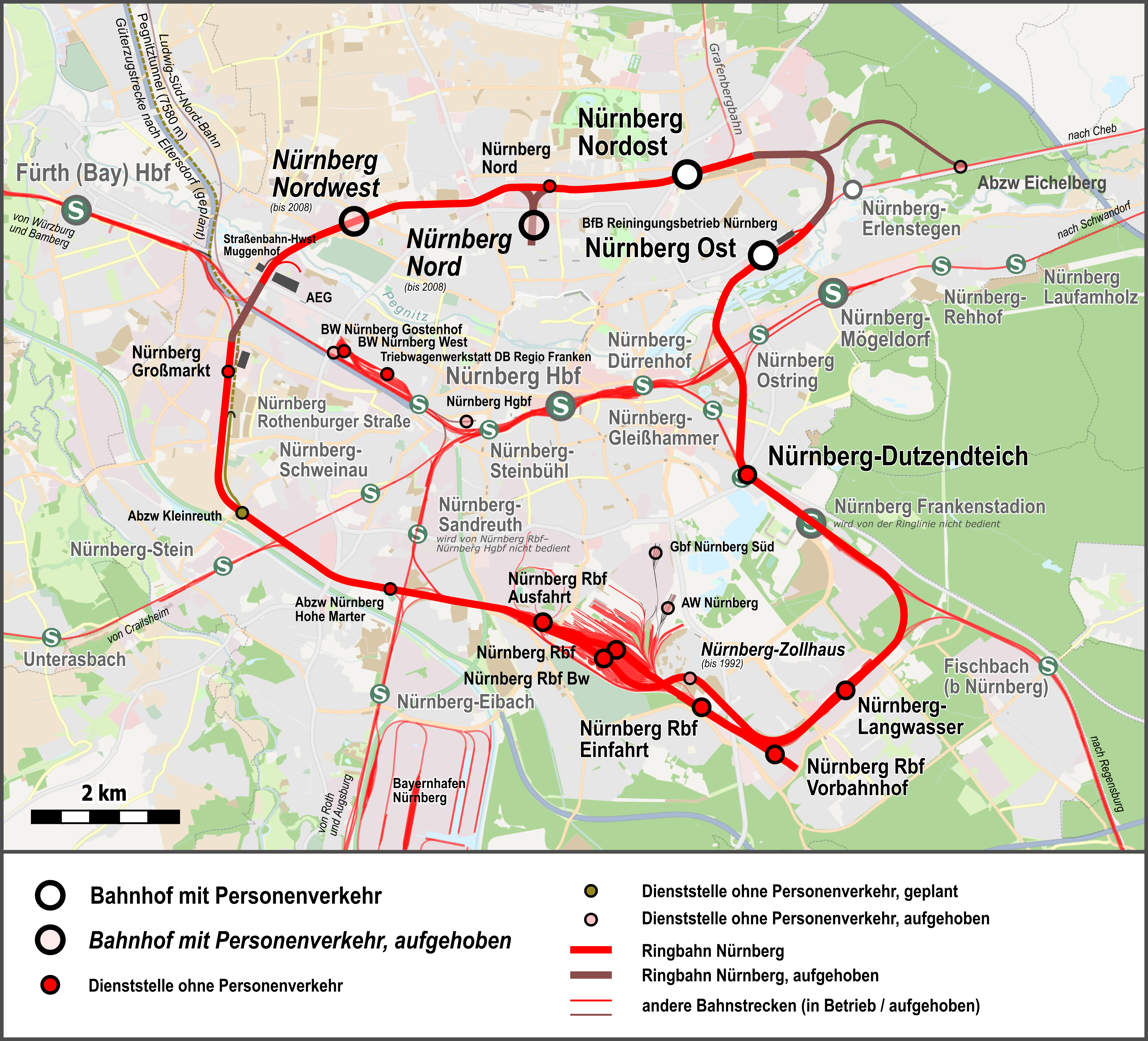

The Nuremberg Ring Railway is the ring railway for freight that runs at a distance of three to four kilometres (2 to 2 1/2 mi) from the center of Nuremberg in the German state of Bavaria.

== History ==
The first section ("south ring") was opened on 1 October 1898 and joined the lines from Crailsheim, from Augsburg and from Regensburg with the Rangierprovisorium (temporary marshalling yard) on the site of today's Nuremberg marshalling yard (Nürnberg Rbf).

Just a year later, on 1 July 1899, the first part of the "northern ring" from Nuremberg East (Nürnberg Ost) station (on the Nuremberg–Cheb railway) via Nuremberg Northeast (Nürnberg Nordost) station to Nuremberg North (Nürnberg Nord) station was put into operation. This was connected to the south ring on 1 May 1900 with the opening of the Dutzendteich–Mögeldorf/Ostbahnhof line.

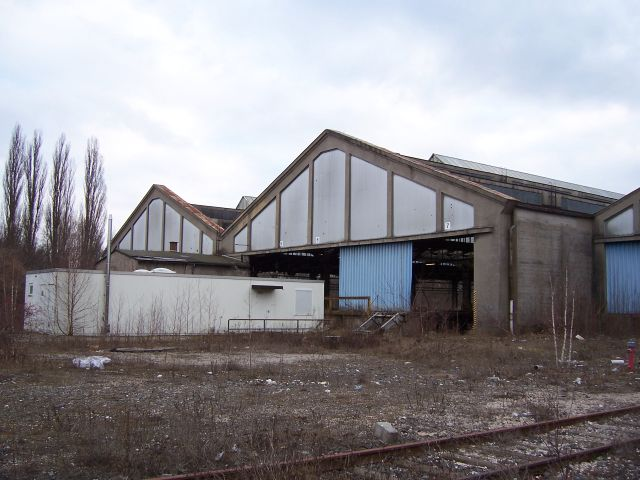
Current condition of the former Nuremberg South good yard

The "closing of the ring" finally took place in two stages: the extension from Nuremberg North to Nuremberg West was opened on 1 May 1905 and this was followed by the last section from Nuremberg Northwest (Nürnberg Nordwest) to Muggenhof junction and from there to Fürth (over the Nuremberg–Bamberg railway) and via Großreuth to the existing southern part of the Ring Railway on 1 October 1910. Thus, the 30-kilometre-long (19 mi) ring was completed.

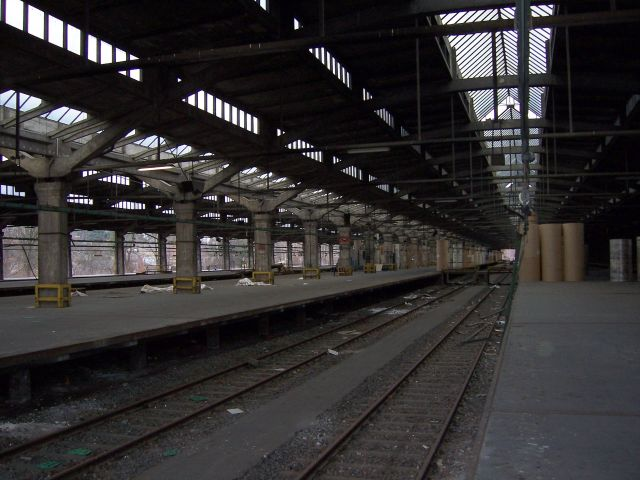
This hall was used for the display of rolling stock at the celebrations for the 125th and 150th anniversary of German railways

The southern part of the Ring Railway was duplicated in 1903. The section from Nürnberg Hauptbahnhof via Dutzendteich and the marshalling yard to the Nuremberg–Augsburg line was electrified in 1935. For the construction of the Nazi party rally grounds in the area between Luitpoldhain, Dutzendteich and Langwasser, the connection from the marshalling yard to the Nuremberg–Regensburg line was moved 1.6 kilometres (0.99 mi) to the southeast in 1938. The original line ran from the western end of the reception sidings in an arc north to Zollhaus and the area of the swimming stadium and an area currently used for allotments, where the tracks separate to run towards Nürnberg Hauptbahnhof or the Nuremberg–Regensburg line. The new line connects at the eastern end of the reception sidings, then turns left and runs straight through today's district of Langwasser (formerly Märzfeld north and the SA camp south of the line) and, after crossing Gleiwitzer Straße, branches to connect with the Nuremberg–Regensburg line. Zollhaus station was moved to the new line and a new station was built as Märzfeld (now Nürnberg-Langwasser), which was expected to serve arriving and departing crowds for the annual Nazi Party celebrations.

Between 1938 and 1939, the northern Ring Railway was upgraded. A new connection was built from Eichelsberg junction to the Nuremberg–Cheb line with Nürnberg Nordost station through the Sebalder Reichswald (St. Sebaldus Imperial Forest) north of Erlenstegen so that trains from Hersbruck could run directly on to the northern Ring Railway. Through tracks were built later in 1939 between Nürnberg Nordost and Nürnberg Nordwest stations to bypass Nürnberg Nord station. So by the beginning of the Second World War, a simple northern bypass of Nuremberg Hauptbahnhof was possible.

=== Passenger traffic on the Ring Railway ===
In the 1930s, there were plans for passenger traffic on the northern section of the Ring Railway, but these were thwarted by the Second World War. Only the section from Nürnberg Hauptbahnhof via Nuremberg East to Nuremberg Northeast had passenger services, but only in 1911 and 1912. Another service was established in 1904 for staff traffic between Nürnberg Hauptbahnhof and Nürnberg Rbf Ausfahrt (Nuremberg marshalling yard departure sidings) station. After the establishment of the Verkehrsverbund Großraum Nürnberg (Greater Nuremberg Transport Association) on 27 September 1987, this could be used by normal passengers, but in 1992 it returned to being a staff-only service.

== The Ring Railway today ==
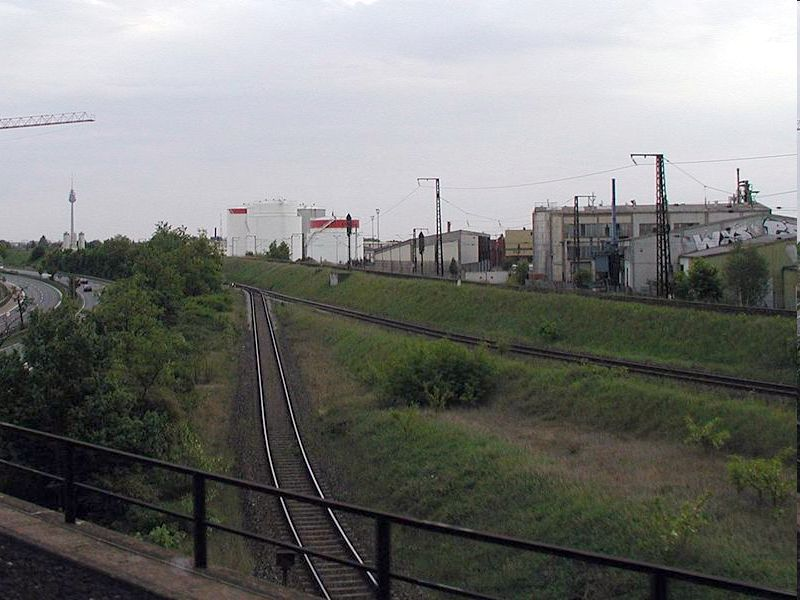
Ring Railway near Nürnberg-Doos

The southern (Fürth/Stein/Eibach–marshalling yard–Dutzendteich/Reichswald junction) section is now completely duplicated and electrified. It continues to be used by freight trains from Würzburg, Bamberg, Crailsheim, Augsburg and Regensburg coming to the yard. The northern part from Fürth to Nürnberg Nordost is single track and non-electrified. Trains only use it if the DMUs used on the Gräfenberg Railway (mostly Class 642—Siemens Desiro Classic; occasionally class 648—Alstom Coradia LINT 41) are reassigned or exchanged and special trains and locomotives of the Franconian Museum Railway are transferred from its operations workshop at Nürnberg Nordost. The freight yards on the northern ring were closed in the late 1990s and Nürnberg Nord had already been abandoned.

The Ring Railway was not spared from rationalisation, which started with the closure of the connection between the south and the north rings at Großmarkt junction with the construction of the Frankenschnellweg in the 1970s, leaving only a connection with the railway to Bamberg from Muggenhof junction, meaning that a complete passage of the Ring Railway required a reversal in Fürth. The connection through the Sebalder Reichswald from Nürnberg Nordost to Eichelsberg junction on the Nuremberg–Cheb line was closed in 1980 and later dismantled. This was followed on 31 May 1992 by the closure of the Nürnberg Ost–Nürnberg Nordost section.

On special occasions the Franconian Museum Railway offers special services on the Ring Railway.

The section of line between Nürnberg Nord and Muggenhof junction was thoroughly renovated between April and May 2011.

== Future ==
Passenger services on the northern section of the Ring Railway has been planned since the 1930s and is still under discussion. There is an option in the Nuremberg regional transport development plan that includes a connection from the Gräfenberg Railway via the Ring Railway to Fürth and from there to the Rangau Railway to Cadolzburg.

The planned Kleinreuth–Eltersdorf railway will create a new freight line from the Bamberg direction, which will connect with the Ring Railway at Kleinreuth bei Schweinau.

== Photographs of the Ring Railway ==
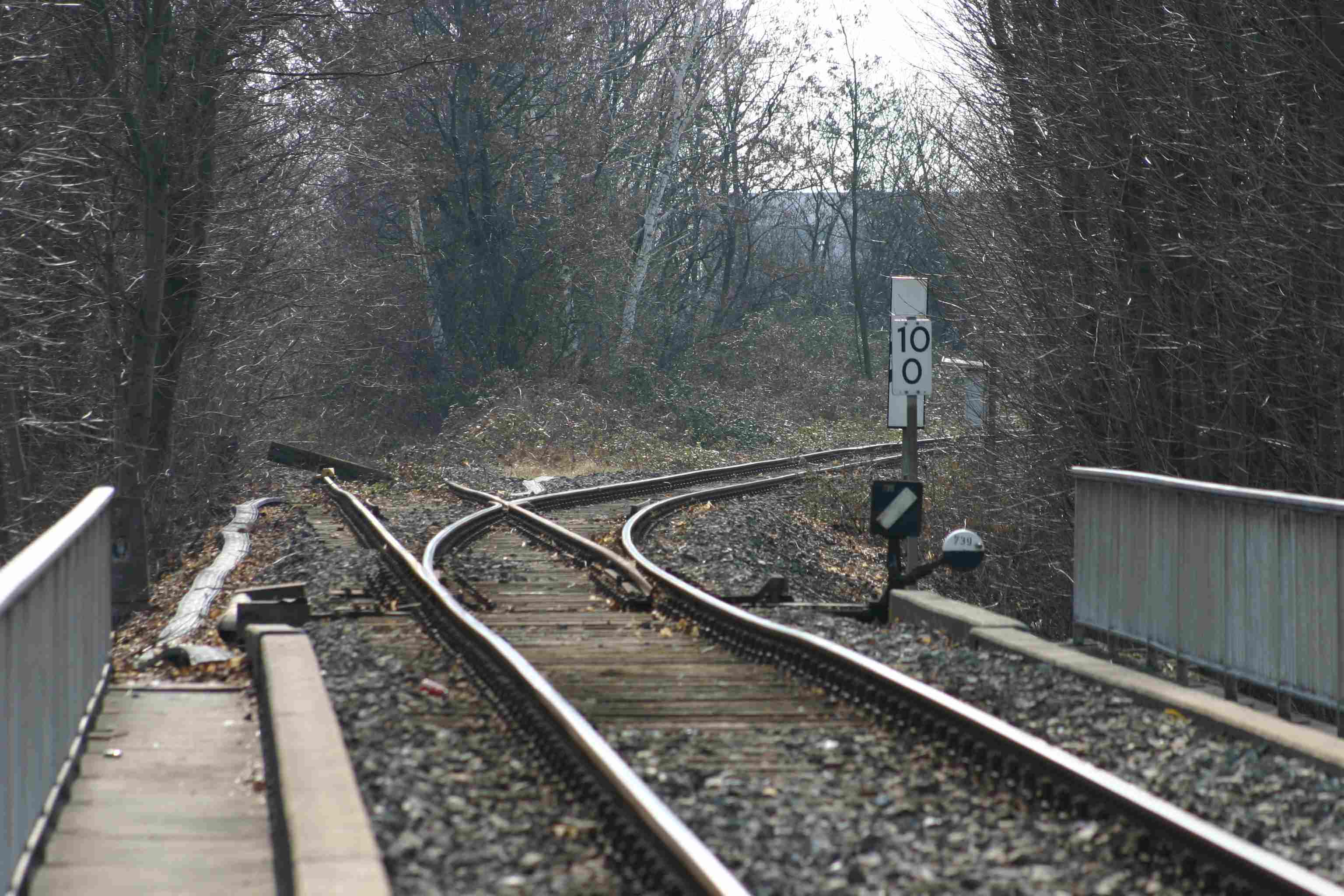
Muggenhof junction in 2005

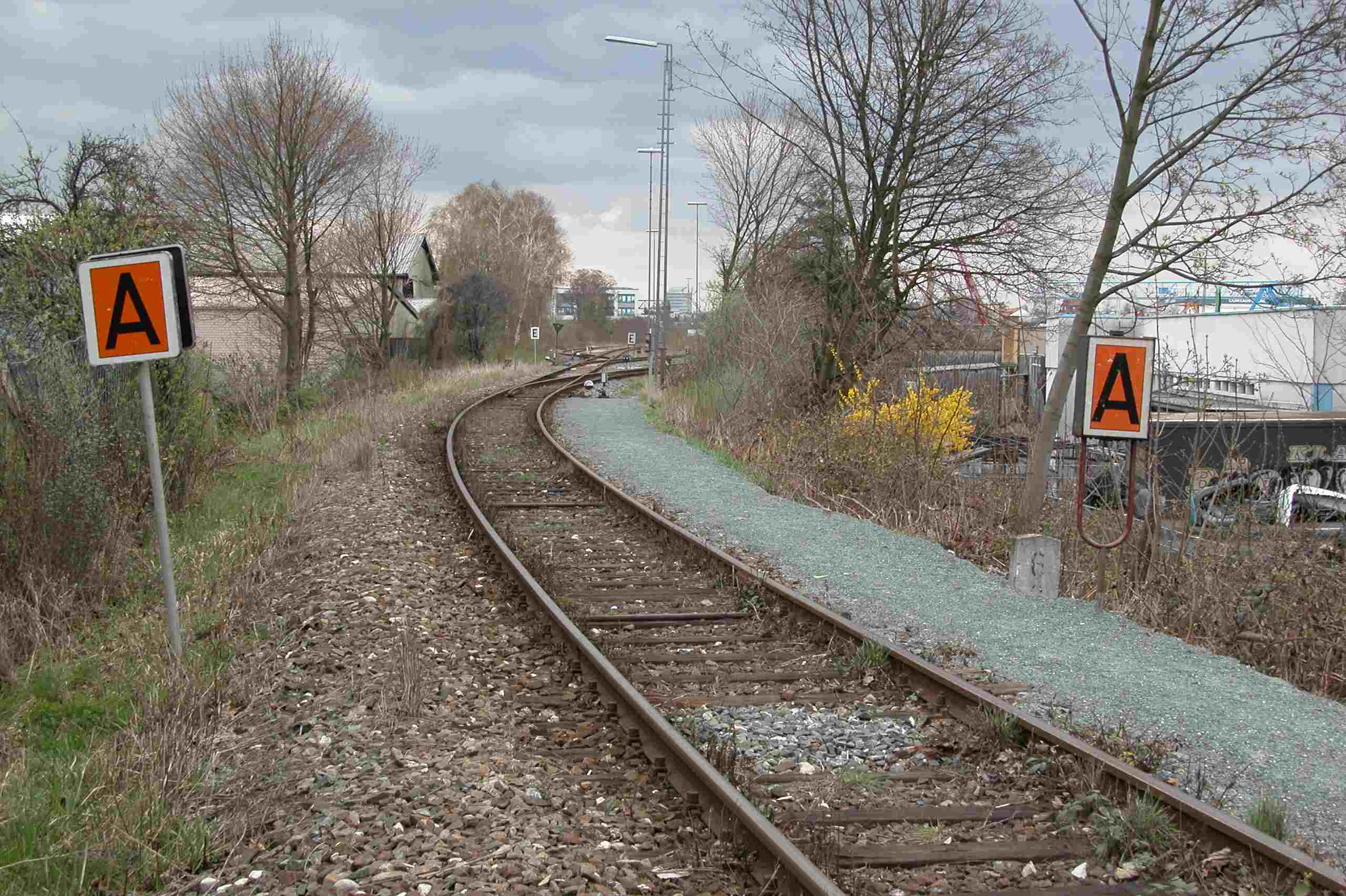
Entrance to Nuremberg North freight yard from the west in 2005

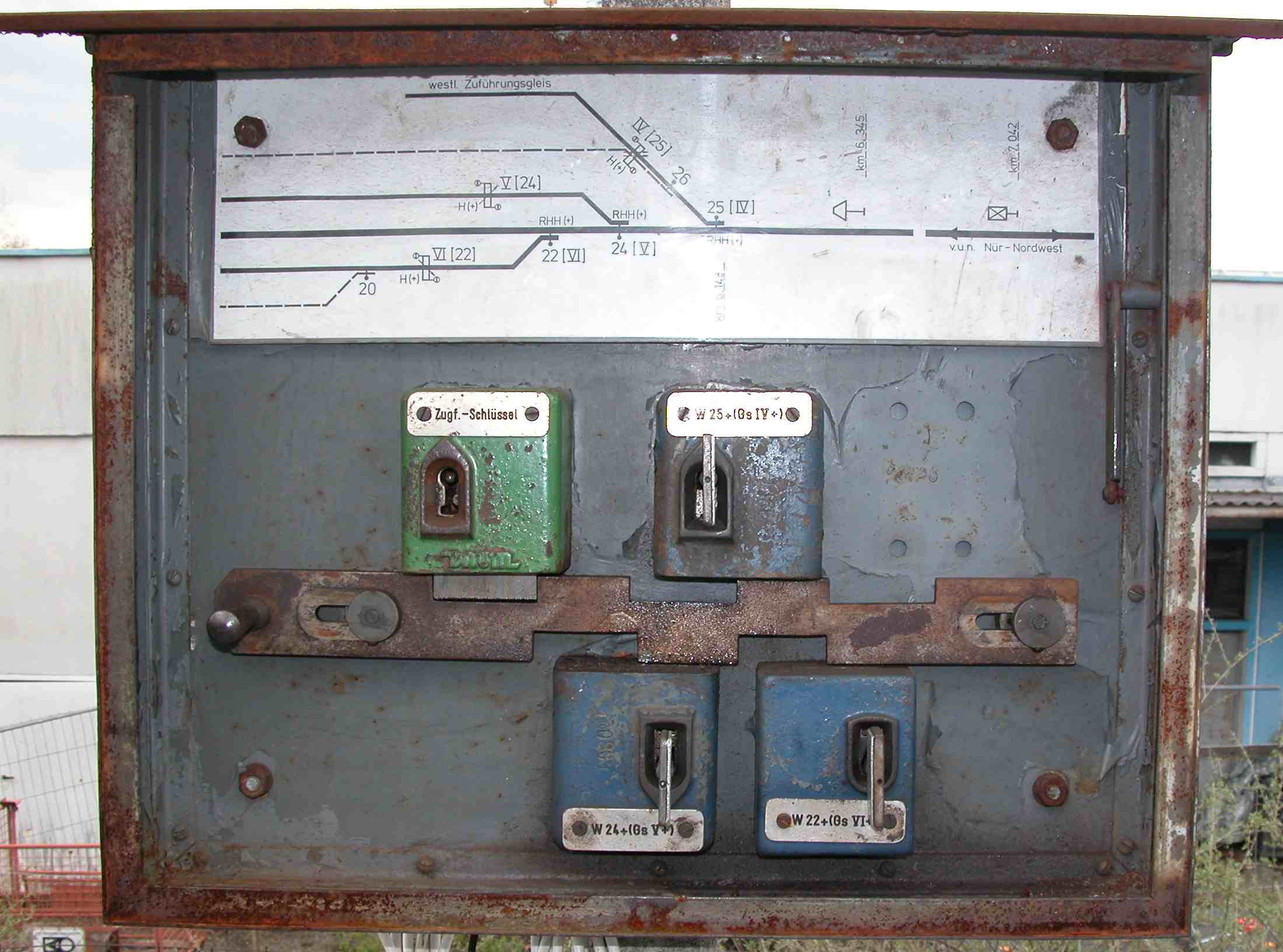
Safe-working key case at Nuremberg North in 2005

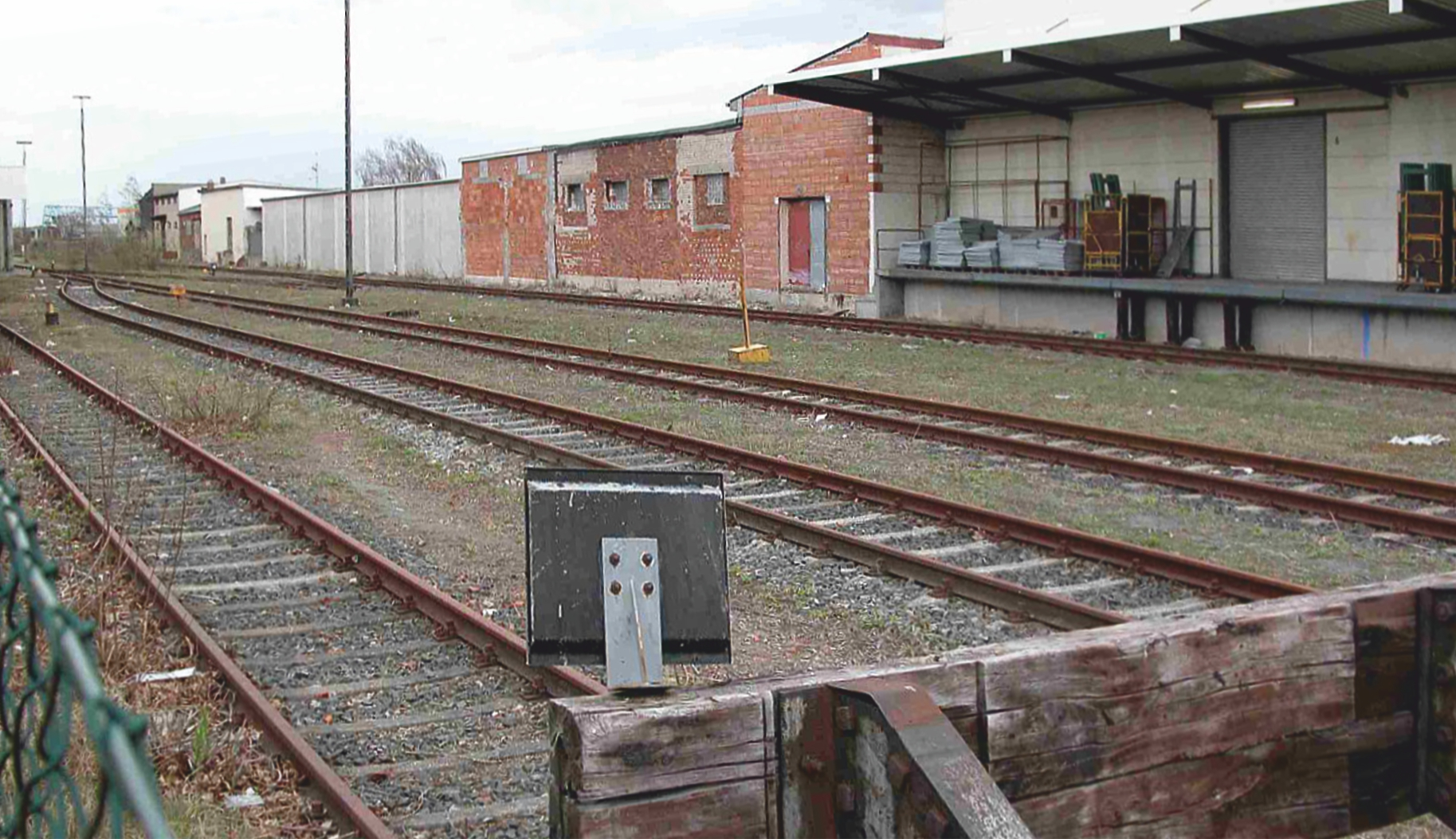
Nuremberg North freight yard in 2005

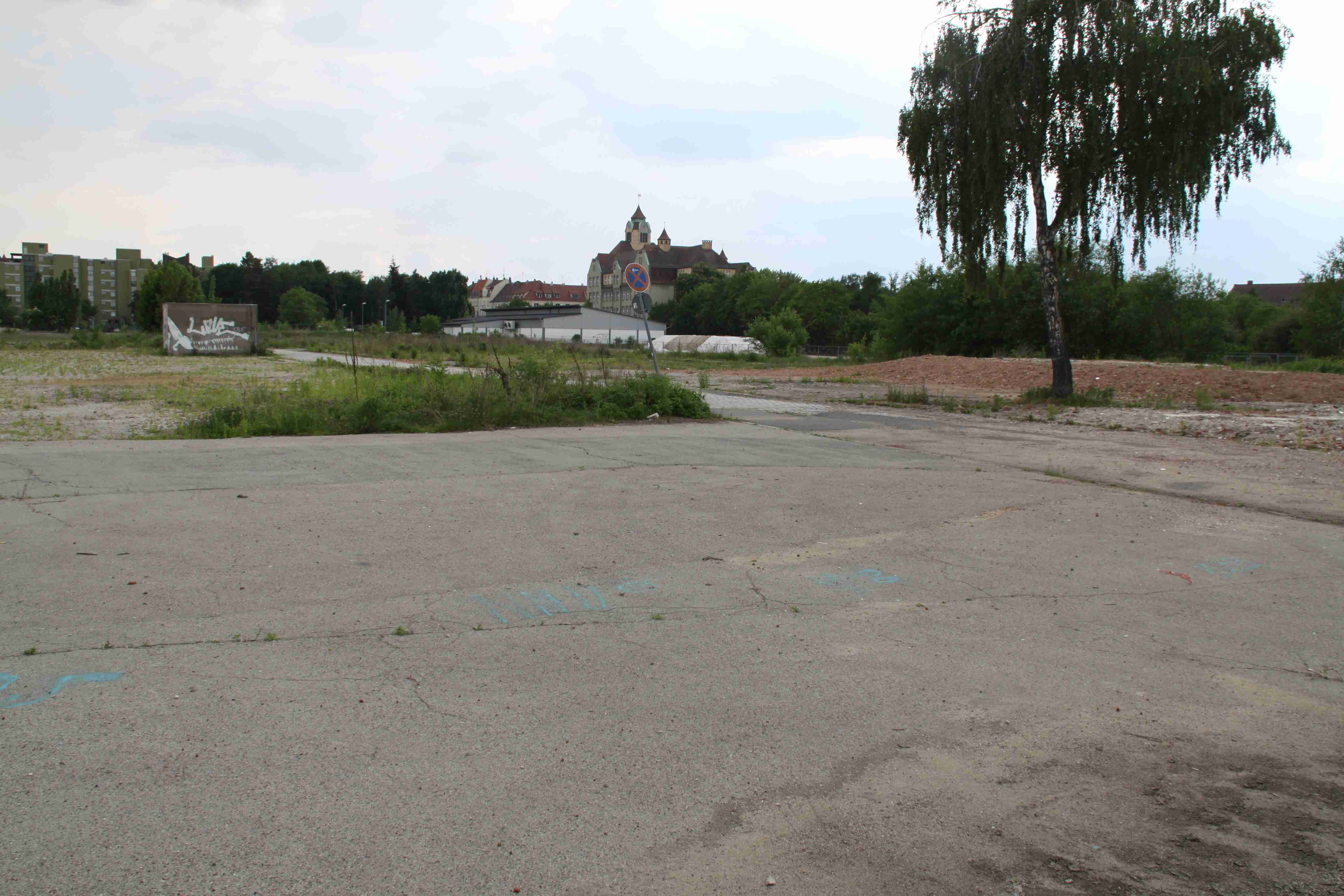
Precinct of former Nuremberg North freight yard in 2011

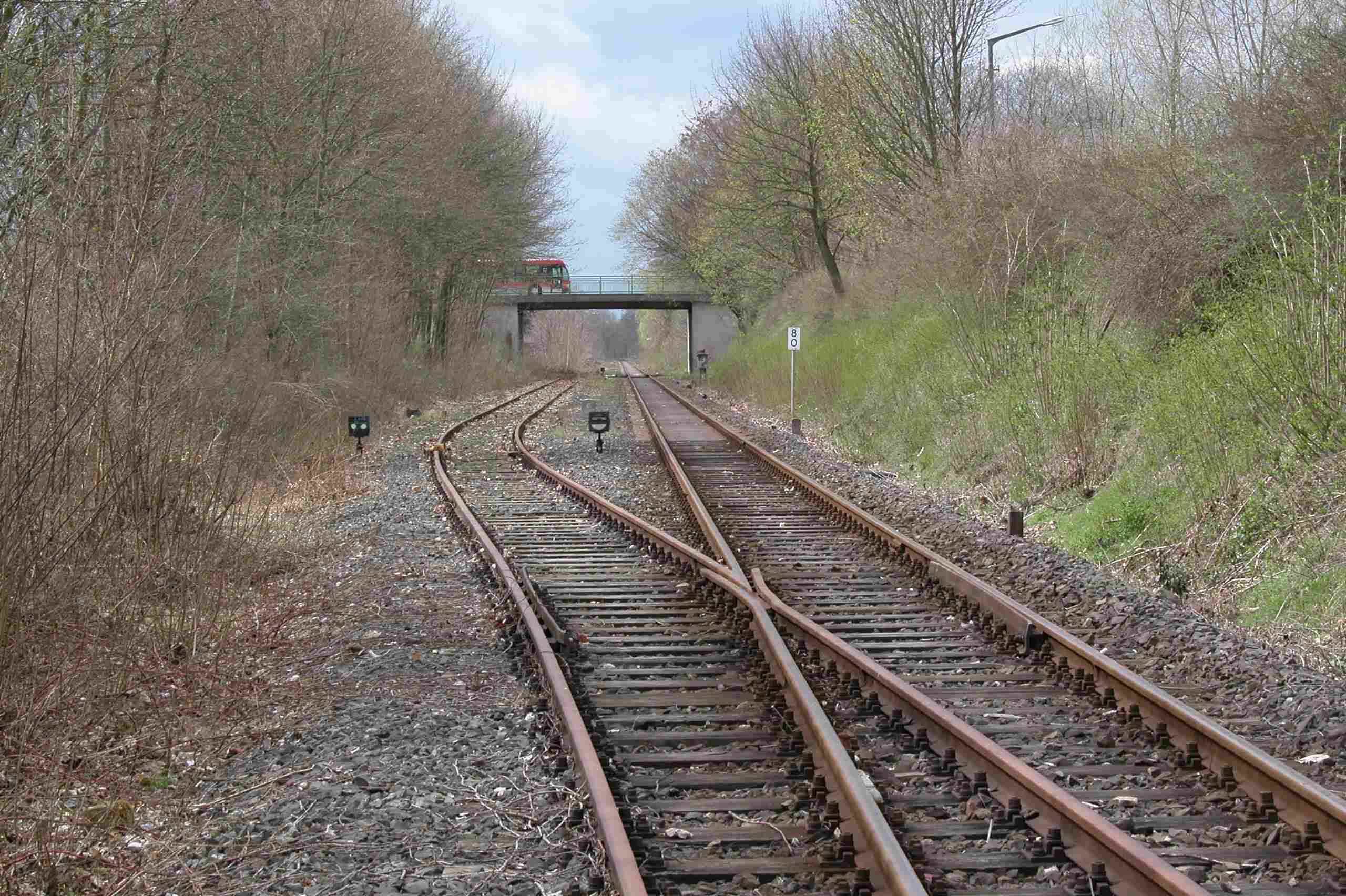
Northwest freight yard in 2005
