= Deuter Sport =

German sport equipment company

- Industry: Backpacks
- Founded: 1898; 128 years ago in Augsburg, Germany
- Founder: Hans Deuter
- Headquarters: Gersthofen, Germany
- Area served: Global
- Parent: Schwan-Stabilo
- Website: deuter.com

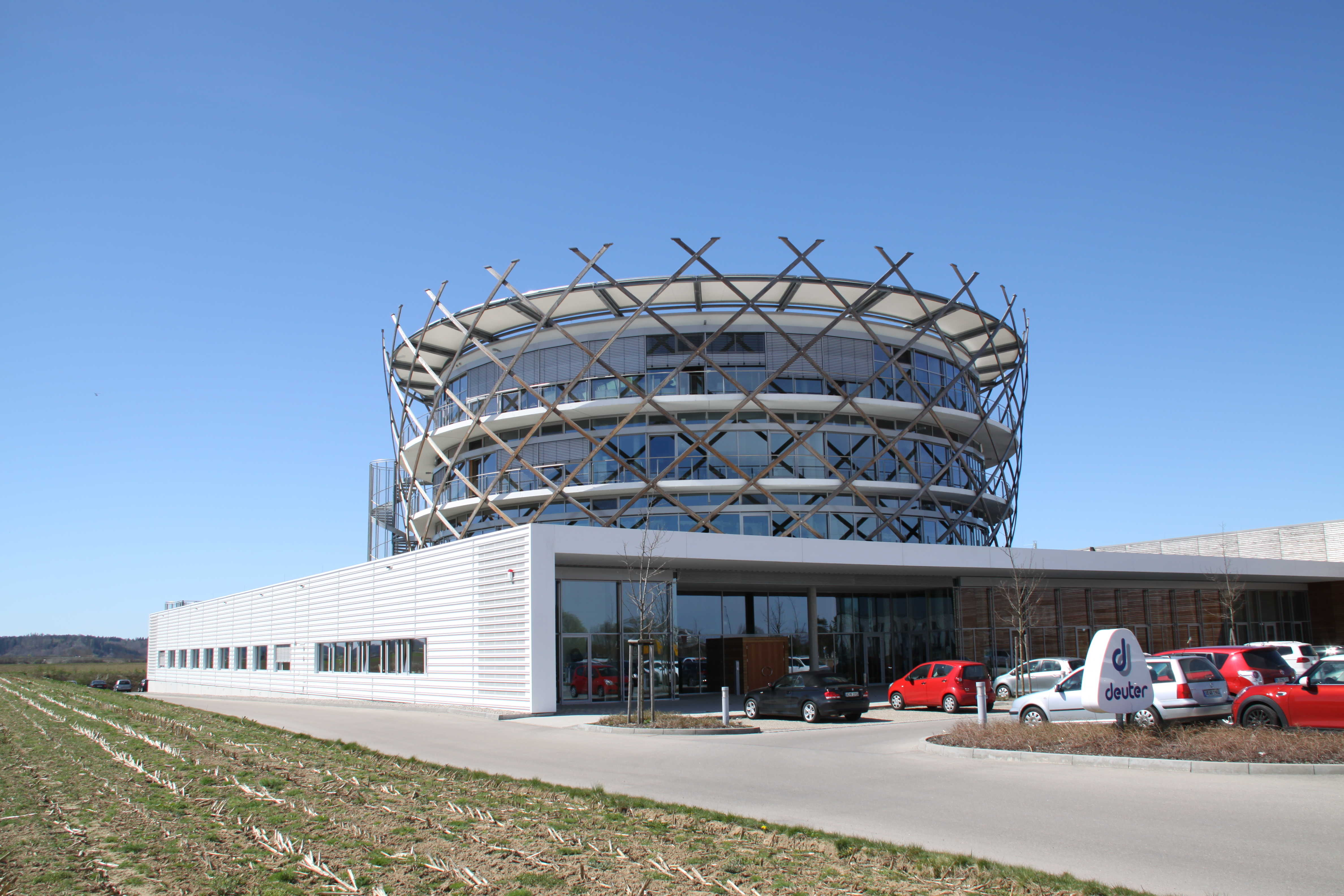
Gersthofen headquarters (2015)

Deuter (German: [ˈdɔʏtɐ]) (stylized as deuter) is a German brand of sport packs and bags, for hiking, trekking, snow sports and other uses. It was founded in 1898 in Augsburg.

== History ==
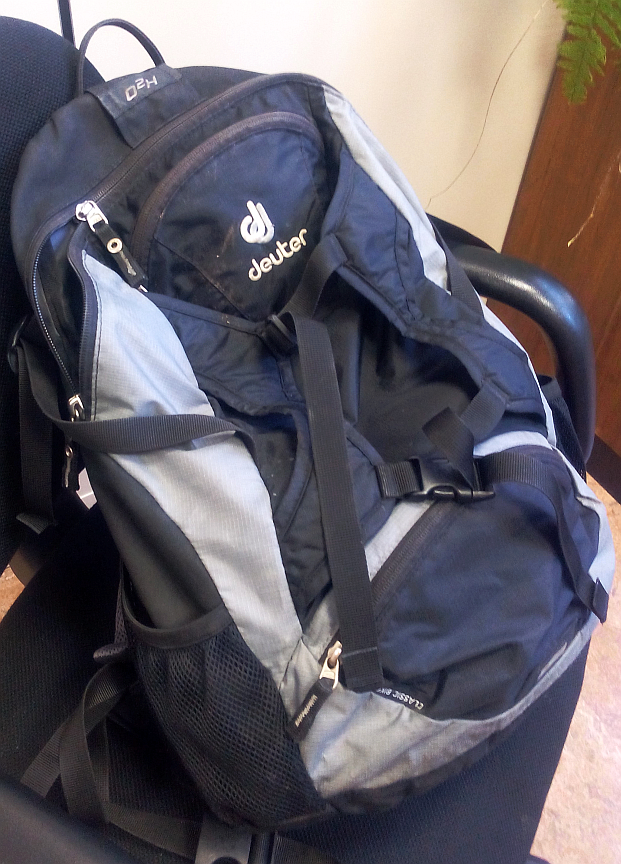
A Deuter Sport backpack

In 1898, Hans Deuter founded Deuter Sport. Starting in the 1900s, Deuter Sport provided the Bavarian Royal Mail with post sacks and mail bags. The company expanded in 1905 from producing linen weaving, sackcloth, freight, car and horse blankets to also include a department that offered tent rentals. In 1910, there was a high demand for products from the military. Deuter Sport began manufacturing satchels, backpacks, knapsacks, belts, mess tents and store tents for the military. Starting in 1919, Deuter Sport expanded once again and began manufacturing suitcases, backpacks, tents, and truck canopies. At this time, the needs of the tent rental section of the company exceeds its 10,000 sq meter space. According to estimates, 9 out of every 10 backpacks used to reach Everest were of the German brand. It is owned since 2006 by Schwan-Stabilo.

== Environmental efforts ==
Deuter Sport commits to be environmentally friendly. The Deuter Drecksack (rubbish bag) is a bag used to carry trash. The bag is very light and very easy to carry and is made out of recycled material. For every Drecksack sold, Deuter donates €1 to the Bergwaldoffensive, an association for the protection of the forests in the Bavarian alps. There have been approximately 23,000 Drecksacks sold to date.
