= Cadolzburg =

- Municipality
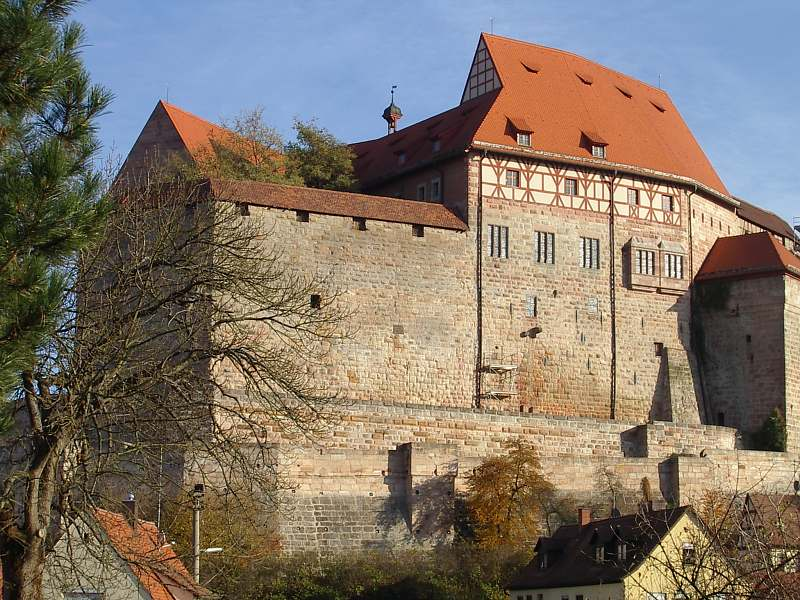
- Cadolzburg Castle (from 1260 seat of the Burgraves of Nuremberg)

- Coat of arms

- Location of Cadolzburg within Fürth district
- Interactive map of Cadolzburg
- Location within Germany Location within Bavaria
- Coordinates: 49°27′N 10°52′E
- Country: Germany
- State: Bavaria
- Admin. region: Mittelfranken
- District: Fürth
- Subdivisions: 16 districts

Government
  - Mayor (2024–30): Sarah Höfler (SPD/BfC)

Area
  - Total: 45.44 km^{2} (17.54 sq mi)
- Elevation: 352 m (1,155 ft)

Population (2025-12-31)
  - Total: 11,203
  - Density: 246.5/km^{2} (638.5/sq mi)
- Time zone: UTC+01:00 (CET)
  - Summer (DST): UTC+02:00 (CEST)
- Postal codes: 90556
- Dialling codes: 09103
- Vehicle registration: FÜ
- Website: www.cadolzburg.de

Cadolzburg (outdated also Kadolzburg German pronunciation: [ˈkadɔlt͡sˌbuɐg], colloquially pronounced "Kalschbu^{r}ch" [kalʃbuɐç] or "Sporch" [ʃbɔrχ] in the local dialect) is a municipality in the Middle Franconian district of Fürth, in Bavaria, Germany. It is situated 11 km (6.8 mi) west of Fürth. Its name derives from its central castle, first being mentioned in the year 1157.

== Geography ==
The topography varies significantly in its height.

=== Neighborhood ===
Neighboring Municipalities are: (beginning in the north then going clockwise)

- Veitsbronn
- Seukendorf
- Fürth
- Zirndorf
- Ammerndorf
- Großhabersdorf
- Langenzen

=== Districts ===
The municipality of Cadolzburg consists of the city itself and 15 farther districts:

- Ballersdorf
- Deberndorf
- Egersdorf
- Gonnersdorf
- Greimersdorf
- Pleikershof
- Roßendorf
- Rütteldorf
- Schwadermühle
- Seckendorf
- Steinbach
- Vogtsreichenbach
- Wachendorf
- Waldhaus
- Zautendorf

== History ==
=== Middle Ages ===
The place was first mentioned in 1157 when the reeve of Kadolzburg, Helmericus de Kadoldesburc, agreed on a territorial exchange between the diocese of Würzburg the Heilsbronn Abbey. So the name derives from Burg des Kadold meaning "Kadold's castle". If the castle had been built by Duke Kadold, who in the year 793 founded the Herrieden Abbey, it would be an early medieval citadel from the 8th century. More likely, however, seems that it was erected by the allodium of the Abenbergers. The earliest erected parts surviving until today were built around 1250 under the rule of the Hohenzollern, Conrad I. the Burgraves of Nuremberg and his son Fredrick III., as they took residence there. In the year 1397 Fredrick VI. was given all the land "under the mountains" (untergebirgisch) including the residence of Cadolzburg, but merely 20 years later he was gifted the Margraviate of Brandenburg and the title Elector of Brandenburg, his dynasty would later on become Emperors of Germany. Under the reign of his son Albrecht Achilles of Brandenburg Cadolzburg was used as a residence for hunting. In the 14th century the spelling "Cadelspurgk" became common and appeared in various documents form the free imperial city of Nuremberg. It formed part of the Margraviate of Ansbach and thus was part of the Franconian Circle since 1500.

=== Modern times ===
In the late 18th century there were about 120 households in Cadolzburg. The jurisdiction and municipal power were possessed by the brandenburg-ansbach Office Cadolzburg. The landowner was the Kastenamt Cadolzburg, consisting of the castle, a brewhouse, 2 smitheries, one bakery, 2 pubs, 105 houses, 2 halffarms, 1 brick production, and the parish of Cadolzburg (possessing two farms).

In the municipality edict of 1808 the tax district of Cadolzburg was established, the Municipaldistrict of Cadolzburg followed suit in 1810, being superimposable with the tax district. They were subjects in administration and jurisdiction to the Landgericht Cadolzburg and in financial administration to the Rentamt Cadolzburg (restyled Finanzamt Cadolzburg in 1920). It was classified as a Markt with a Magistrate of third class in 1818. Since 1862 Cadolzburg was administrated by the Bezirksamt Fürth (restyled Landkreis Fürth in 1938), but the jurisdiction was left to the Landgericht Cadolzburg until 1879, from 1880 to the first of March 1931 it was given to the Amtsgericht Cadolzburg and since then, the Amtsgericht Fürth is the ordinary court. The financial administration was taken over by the Finanzamt Fürth on 1 January 1929. In 1961 the municipality had an extension of 4,486 km^{2}.

=== Incorporations into the municipality ===
First of January 1972 most parts of the municipality of Deberndorf and on July first the former Municipality of Roßendorf were incorporated into Cadolzburg. 1. May 1978 Steinbach and the district of Seckendorf of the dissolved Municipality of Horbach followed.

In the year 2007 Cadolzburg celebrated its 850th anniversary.

=== Demographics ===
Municipality of Cadolzburg

Year	1987	2007	2008	2009	2010	2011	2012	2013	2014	2015	2016	2017
Inhabitants	8003	10130	10180	10224	10297	10323	10392	10470	10683	10741	10976	11073
Houses	2052							2824	2833	2854	2871	
Source												

City of Cadolzburg (=Municipality of Cadulzburg until the Reform)

Year	1818	1840	1852	1855	1861	1867	1871	1875	1880	1885	1890	1895	1900	1905	1910	1919	1925	1933	1939	1946	1950	1952	1961	1970	1987
Inhabitants	976	1298	1333	1342	1344	1345	1319	1285	1237	1227	1280	1417	1494	1584	1655	1747	1870	2025	2215	3160	3309	3296	3480	3811	4257
Houses	136	165					212			216			239				300				388		554		1059
Source																									

== Politics ==
=== Municipality Council ===
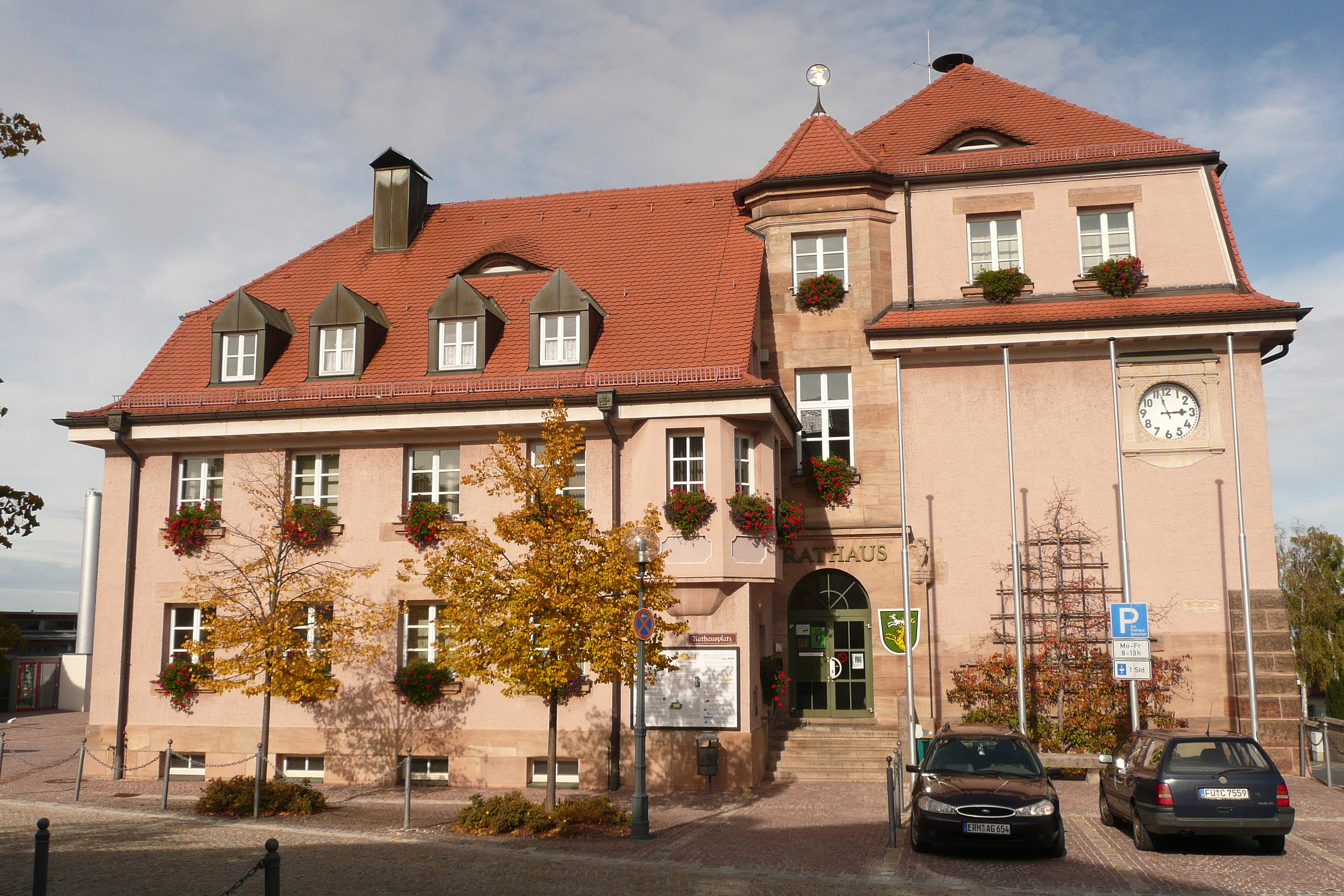
Town hall

Until 2002 the council had 20 members, since the communal elections in 2008 there are 24 members.

	CSU	SPD	Grüne	Independent	FW	Total
2002	8	8	1	2	1	20 seats
2008	12	6	1	4	1	24 seats
2014	11	6	2	3	2	24 seats

(Last updated: Communal elections on 16. March 2014)

=== Mayor ===
From 1978 to 2002 Claus Pierer (SPD) was mayor of the Cadolzburg, followed by Bernd Obst (CSU). On 2 March 2008 he was reelected with 79% of the votes against Hermann Zempel (SPD) with 21%. On 16. March 2014 Obst was elected for his third term with 76% of the votes, while his runup Diana Eichhorn (SPD) received 24%. He was re-elected in 2020. On 17 March 2024, Sarah Höfler (SPD/BfC) was elected mayor after Obst became Landrat of the district of Fürth. She received 56.9% of the votes.

=== Twin cities ===
- France: Le Palais-sur-Vienne
- Austria: Mauterndorf in Salzburg
- Italy: Ulten in South Tyrol

== Notable buildings ==
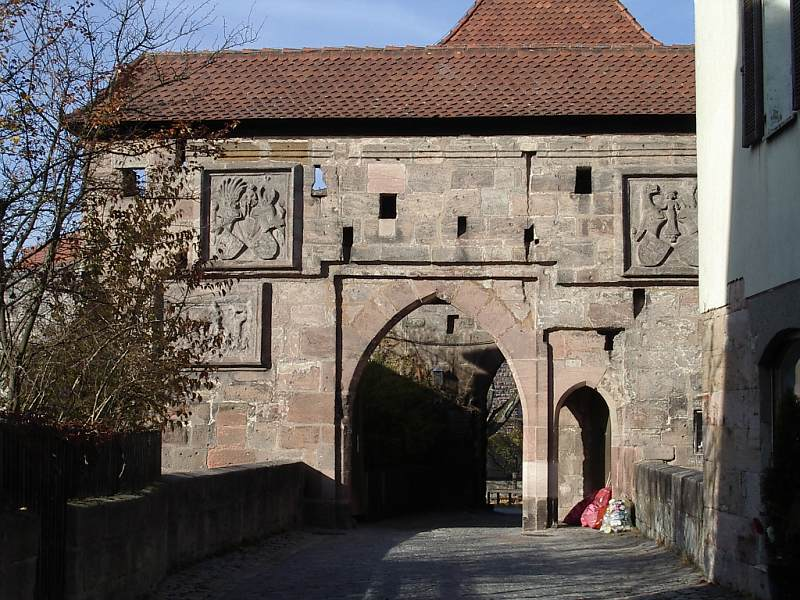
Castle gate with bridge

=== Castle ===
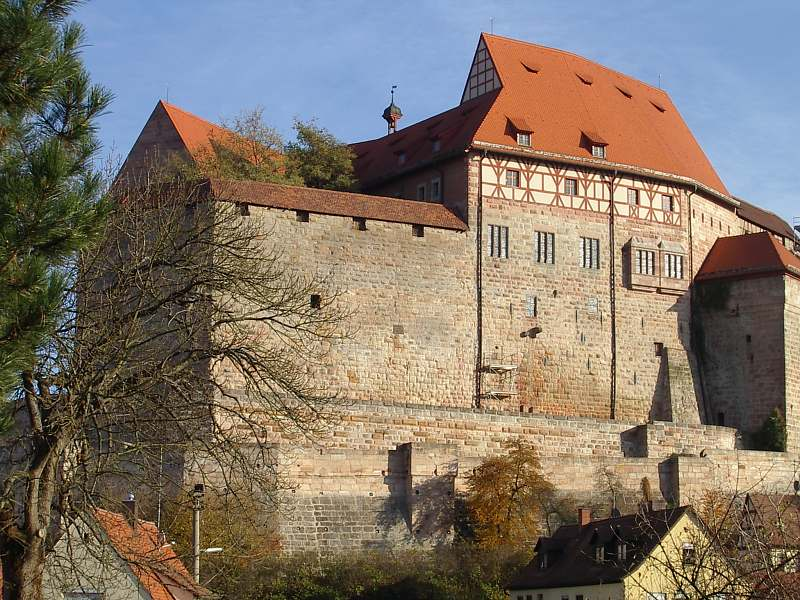
Castle form the west with walls in entire height

The building to be seen nowadays is from the 13th to 18th century, it used to be one of the residences of the Hohenzollern dynasty as burgraves of Nuremberg. Frederick I. of Brandenburg rebuilt it entirely, and later died there in 1440. For the church dedicated to St. Cecilia he donated the altar (1420/25), on which he is depicted together with his wife Elisabeth of Bavaria-Landshut in the middle part, right under the crucifixion scene. The side parts show St. Cecilia together with their groom, St. Valerian. The altar was gifted to Frederick III. on his request and moved to Berlin. The original is today in the Jagdschloss Grunewald, but the church displays a copy. The Castle was not damaged during the Thirty Years' War.

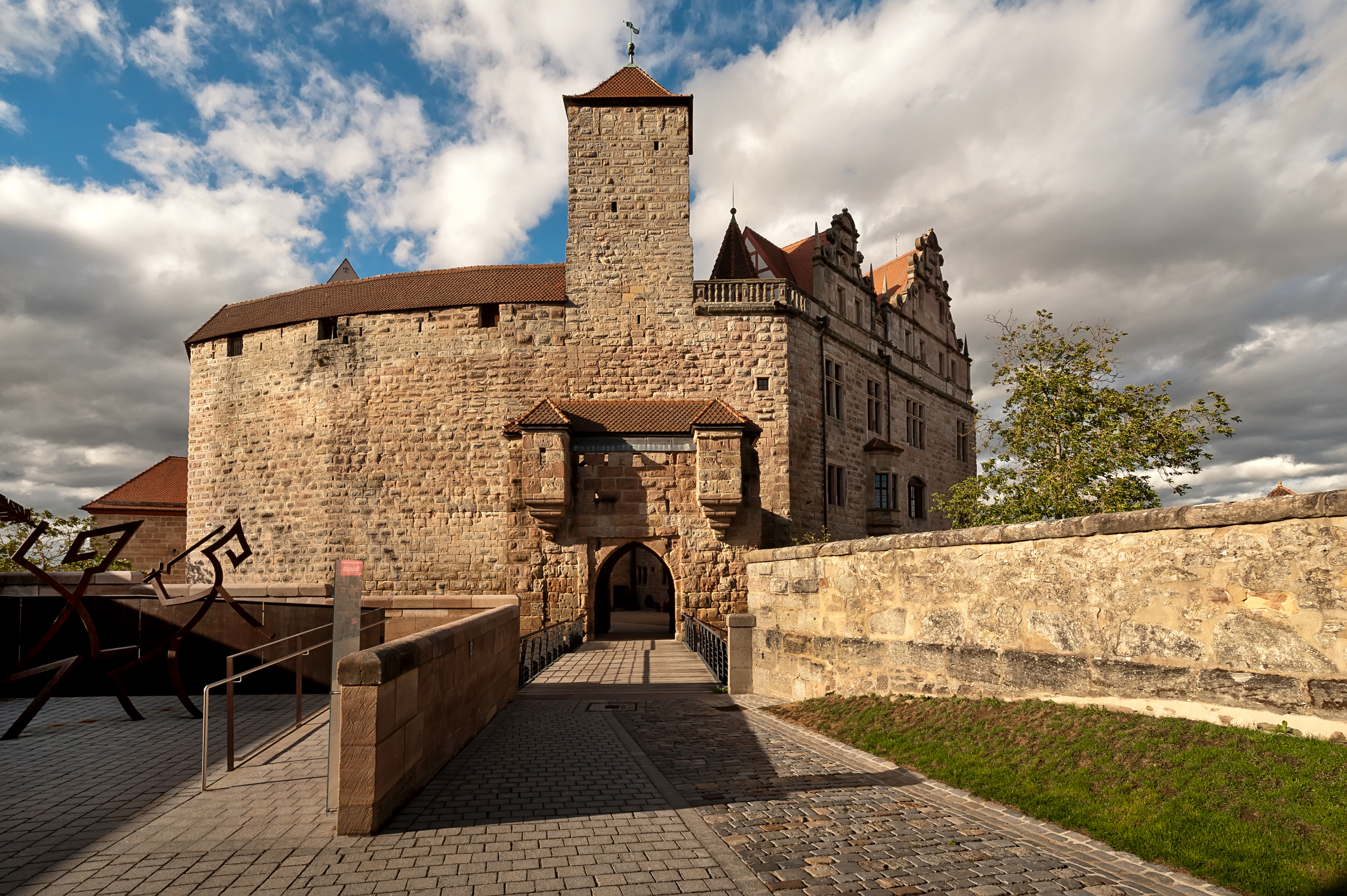
Castle garden

1933–1945 a part of the castle, the so-called Neues Schloss (New Palace) was used as a Gebietsführerschule by the Hitler Youth. At the end of the war the castle burned down and was left a ruin for various decades. Since 1979 the Bavarian Administration of State-Owned Palaces, Gardens and Lakes together with the Bauamt Nuremberg-Erlangen is responsible for the reconstruction and maintenance of the castle. The reconstruction started in 1982 with the Castle itself and was finished in 2007 with the new creation of the gardens. For seven years the inner and outer parts of the castle were open to the public and events were held.

In 2013, it was decided to transform the Altes Schloss (Old Palace) into an experiential museum. In 2017 it was opened under the name "HerrschaftsZeiten. Erlebnis Cadolzburg".

South to the Main Castle exists an Antecastle (Vorburg) consisting of multiple buildings from the 17th and 18th century and a walled garden. The Wall Tower with the included clock is a gothic element from the 13th/14th century.

=== Observation Tower ===
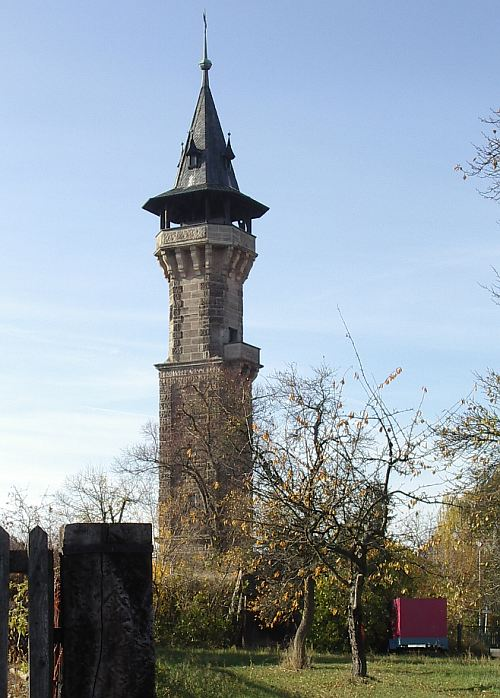
Observation tower from the south

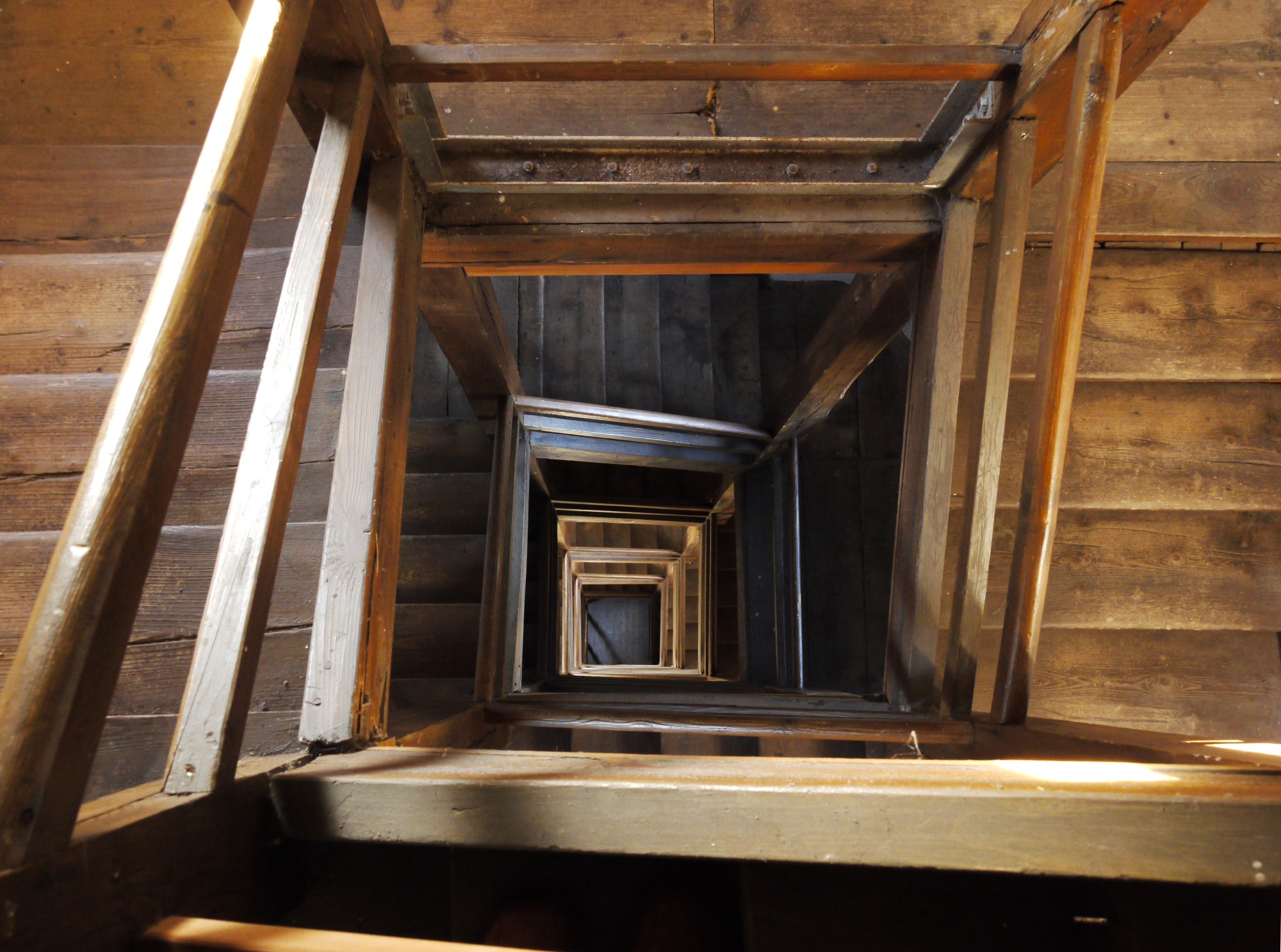
A view down the wooden staircase of the town's watchtower

This tower (commonly called "the pencil"), being 25m, was built 1893 in a high place by the Lokalbahn Aktien Gesellschaft (LAG) in the neogothic style to boost tourism. It used to be a popular destination for visitors from Fürth, especially when the cherry trees around the town bloomed. A square based wooden stairway goes five floors up; about half of the way there is a small balcony on one side of the tower, blocked by a wooden door. The roofed viewing platform based on a console looms over the upper part of the tower, which is slightly slimmer than the former part. The roof has decorative windows on every side. It is open from sunrise to sunset and can be entered for a small fee. In the roof of the tower peregrine falcons can be observed by webcam.

=== Other sights ===
Most parts of the city wall from the 15th century are still existent, above the Torturm (tower gate) one can see the carved date "1476".

The lutheran Markgrafenkirche St. Cäcilia was built in the years 1750/51 as a classical baroque form (Saalbau) over the original (most likely gothic) church house. Its interior is dominated by a matroneum going round the building, maintaining an organ in the west. The baptismal font originates in the baroque phase (1751). Noticeable is the crufying group with wooden sculptures from the school of Veit Stoß (Mary and John dating back to 1470/80 and the crucifix 1500).

=== Local museum (Heimatmuseum) ===
The 1668 built former Town Hall was restored and made a local museum by the Heimatverein das Rangau-Heimathaus. Visitors can learn in twelve rooms about the local history and the geology of the region.

== Economy and infrastructure ==
=== Transport ===
In the first half of the 1880s Cadolzburg was connected via stagecoach to Heilbronn, having a station of the Nuremberg-Crailsheim railway. This lost its importance due to the annex of the Rangaubahn (the railway from Nuremberg via Fürth to Zirndorf). For a short time it was considered to further enlarge the line, exploring the quarries of the Dillenberg with the train but it was abandoned later due to difficulties with the topography.

The Highway 2409, a connection between the Bundesstraße 14 close to Roßtal and the Bundesstraße 8 close to Seukendorf, leads through the Municipality.

The public transport is organized by the Verkehrsverbund Großraum Nürnberg, the lines 136 and 152 connect Cadolzburg with neighboring towns and also a Regionalbahn from Fürth Central Station that terminates there.

In April 2016 there was a referendum whether or not to build a road around the town to reduce traffic within it. It was defeated with 69.61%.

=== Education ===
Most High School students either visit the Dietrich-Bonhoeffer-Gymnasium in Oberasbach, the Wolfgang-Borchert-Gymnasium in Langenzenn or the Staatliche Realschule Zirndorf.

=== Companies ===
- Cadolto, producing buildings based on containers
- Schokoladenfabrik Riegelein, founded 1953

=== Public Institutions ===
There is a youth center Jugendzentrum Herz in Cadolzburg

=== Clubs ===
TSV Cadolzburg: The soccer department, which by far is the biggest part of the TSV, consists of eleven teams, have three normal and one small soccer field to play and compete.

== Notable persons ==
- Albert III, Elector of Brandenburg
- Frederick III, Burgrave of Nuremberg
- Conrad I, Burgrave of Nuremberg
- Frederick I, Elector of Brandenburg
- Puchta family
- Johann Georg Pisendel
