= Langenzenn =

- Town
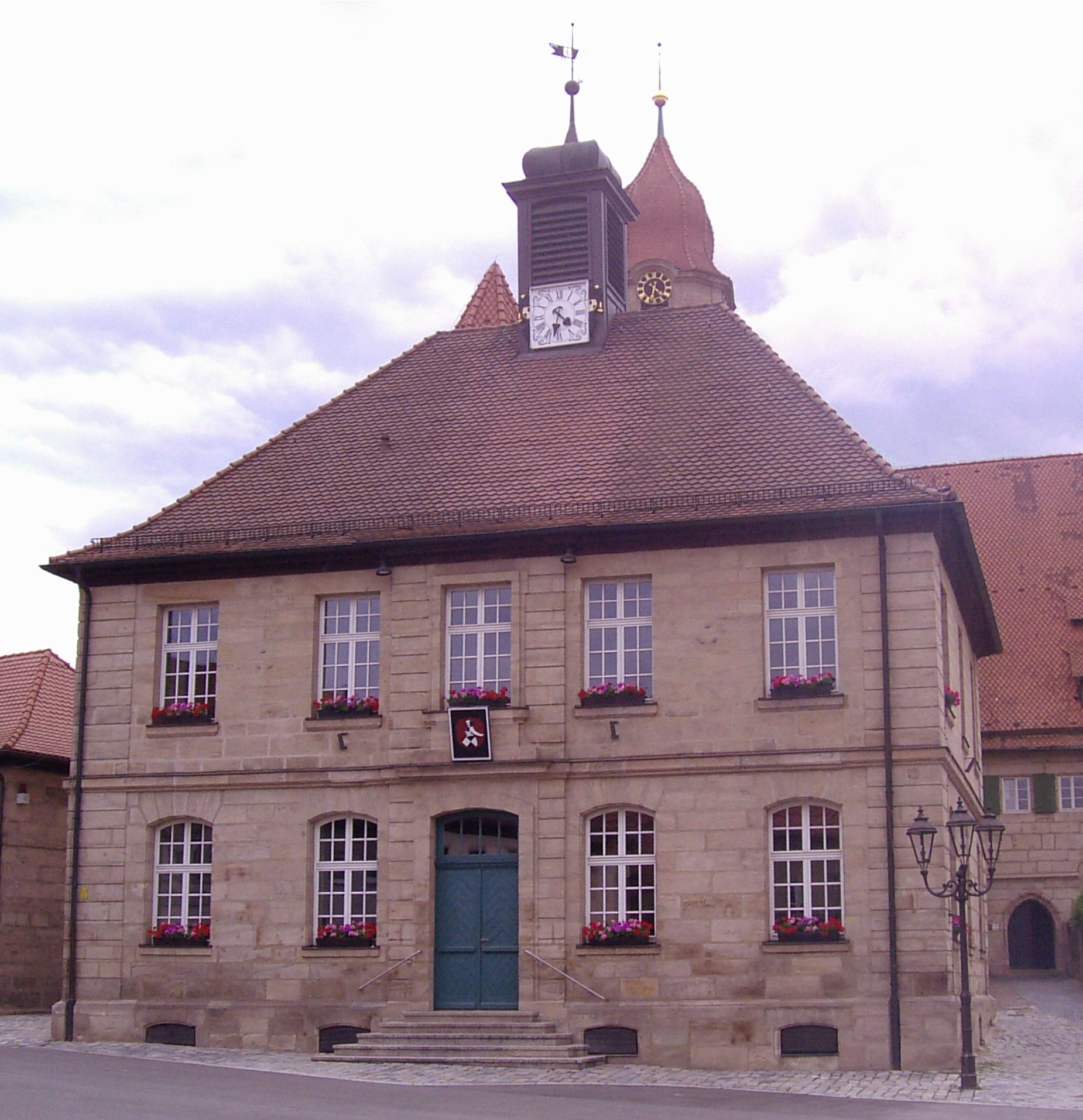
- Old Town Hall

- Coat of arms

- Location of Langenzenn within Fürth district
- Interactive map of Langenzenn
- Location within Germany Location within Bavaria
- Coordinates: 49°29′40″N 10°47′41″E
- Country: Germany
- State: Bavaria
- Admin. region: Mittelfranken
- District: Fürth
- Subdivisions: 23 Stadtteile

Government
  - Mayor (2020–26): Jürgen Habel (CSU)

Area
  - Total: 46.33 km^{2} (17.89 sq mi)
- Elevation: 313 m (1,027 ft)

Population (2025-12-31)
  - Total: 10,485
  - Density: 226.3/km^{2} (586.1/sq mi)
- Time zone: UTC+01:00 (CET)
  - Summer (DST): UTC+02:00 (CEST)
- Postal codes: 90579
- Dialling codes: 09101
- Vehicle registration: FÜ
- Website: www.langenzenn.de

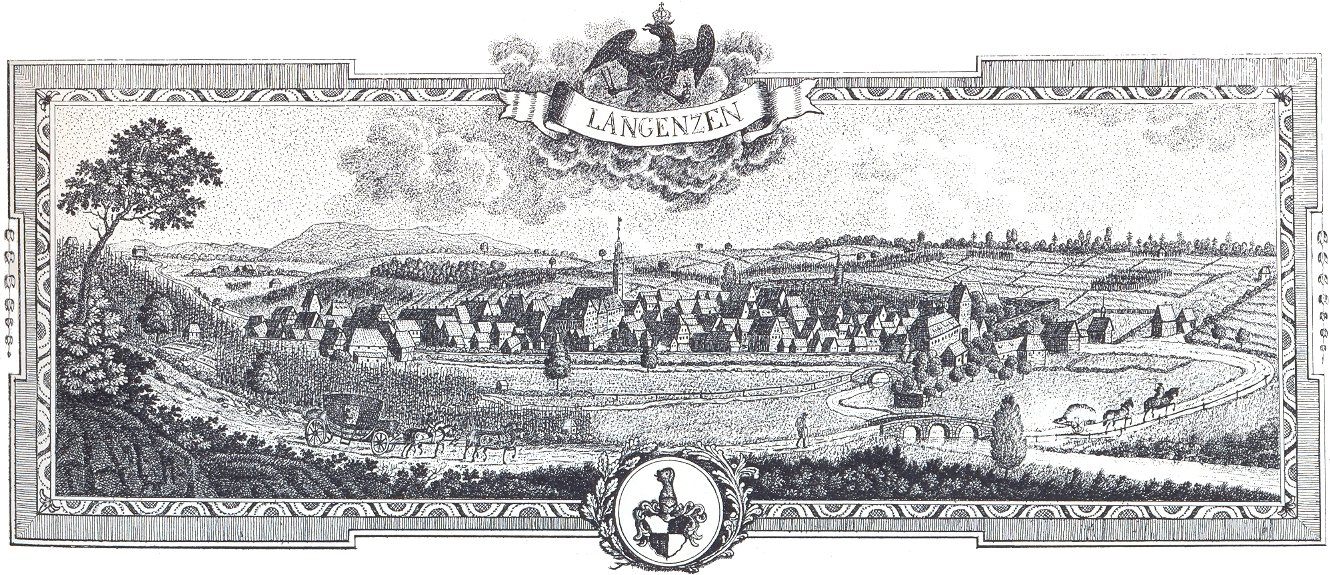
Langenzenn around 1800

Langenzenn (German pronunciation: [laŋənˈtsɛn]; East Franconian: Langadsen) is a town in the district of Fürth, in Bavaria, Germany. It is situated 15 km west of Fürth. The town lies on the river Zenn and has a population of 10,339 (31 December 2012).

== Geography ==
It belongs to the district of Fürth near Nürnberg and lies in the Rangau.

Neighbouring Towns:

- Wilhermsdorf (6.3 km)
- Großhabersdorf
- Cadolzburg (7.36 km)
- Veitsbronn (6.29 km)
- Puschendorf (4.41 km)
- Emskirchen (8.19 km)
- Hagenbüchach (4.41 km)

== History ==
First possible historic mention in 903 by king Ludwig IV as 'Zenna'. It is not proven whether 'Zenna' means Langenzenn here or the abandoned village Zennhausen near Neuhof an der Zenn.

The first evident mention is in 954 when King Otto I held an important meeting with the German nobles in Langenzenn to reunite them.

Langenzenn was granted the rights and privileges of a town in 1360. Around that time the Halsgericht moved from Cadolzburg to Langenzenn. Thus the town was granted full jurisdiction. The last execution was carried out in 1763. In 1361 it was granted the right to mint money by King Karl IV.

A big fire in 1720 destroyed the town hall. A new town hall was built, which still exists.

== Development of population ==
Year	Population
1809	1659
1855	1906
1900	1953
1910	2003
1920	1933
1930	2186
1939	2816
1945	2840
1950	4277
1960	4817
1970	5337
1987	8280
2004	10700

== Culture ==
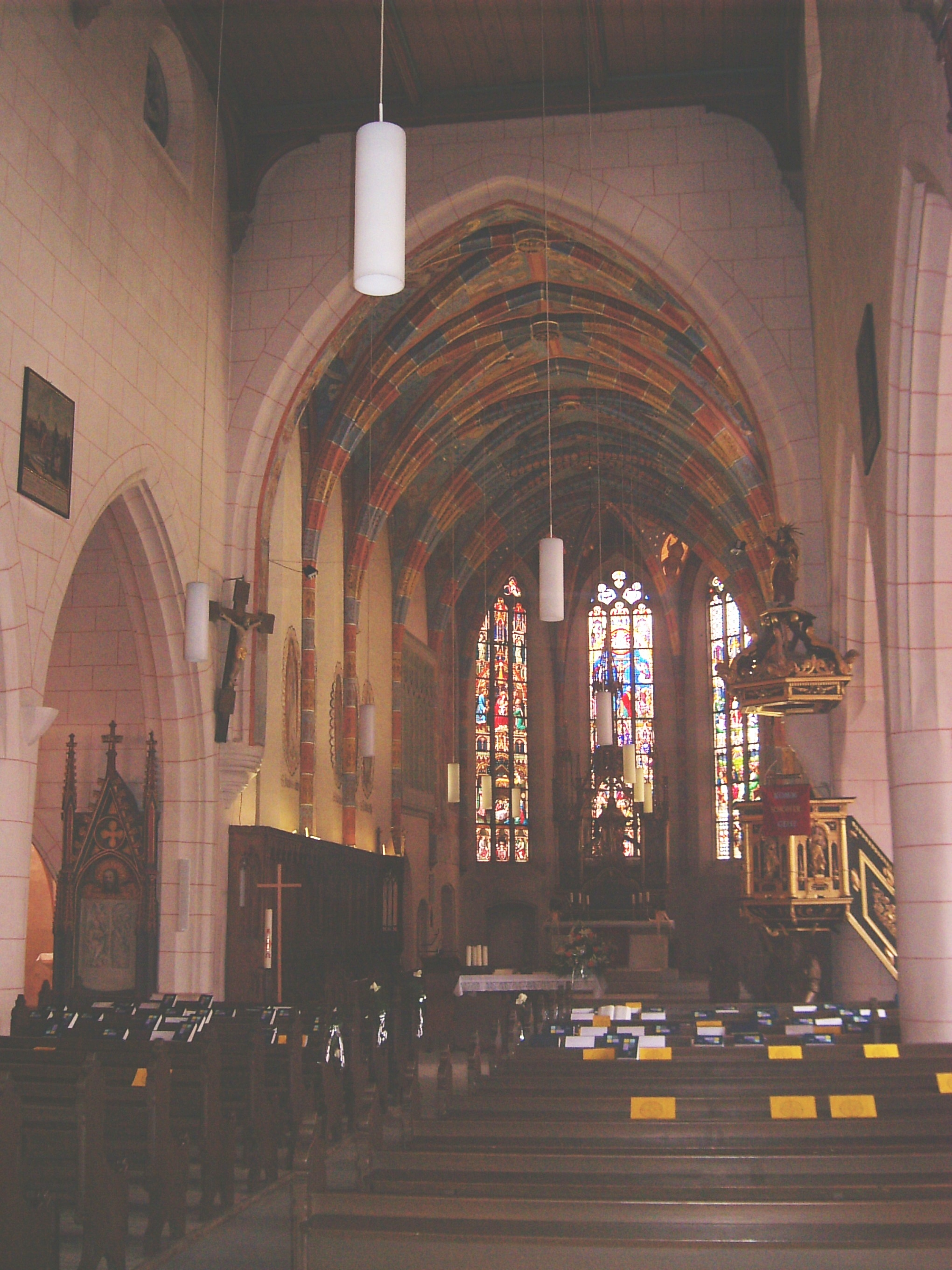
Inner church

Langenzenn has a theatre where the Klosterhofspiele Langenzenn are performed every summer. Another ensemble with more tradition is the Hans-Sachs-Spielgruppe. Both act in the courtyard of the medieval monastery, which was built in 1409. The Gothic Evangelical church has existed since 1369. Langenzenn still has the remains of its city wall. In 2005 and 2006 the Prinzregentenplatz, the town's medieval market place, was remodelled.

=== Klosterhofspiele ===
For many years the Klosterhofspiele have been a part of Langenzenn culture.

They staged for example Le Bourgeois gentilhomme (2001) and Le Malade imaginaire (1990) by Molière, Twelfth Night (1989), The Merry Wives of Windsor (2004) and The Taming of the Shrew (2002) by Shakespeare, and Lysistrata (2003) by Aristophanes.

=== Hans-Sachs-Spielgruppe ===
The ensemble was founded in 1963. The chairman is Klaus Roscher.

== Economy and infrastructure ==
Langenzenn lies on the dual carriageway Südwesttangente, so it is well connected to Fürth/Nürnberg. The Zenngrundbahn railway was built in 1872. It travels from Fürth to Markt Erlbach and back every hour. Langenzenn has three stations: Langenzenn main railway station, Hardhof and Laubendorf.

== Public Institutions ==
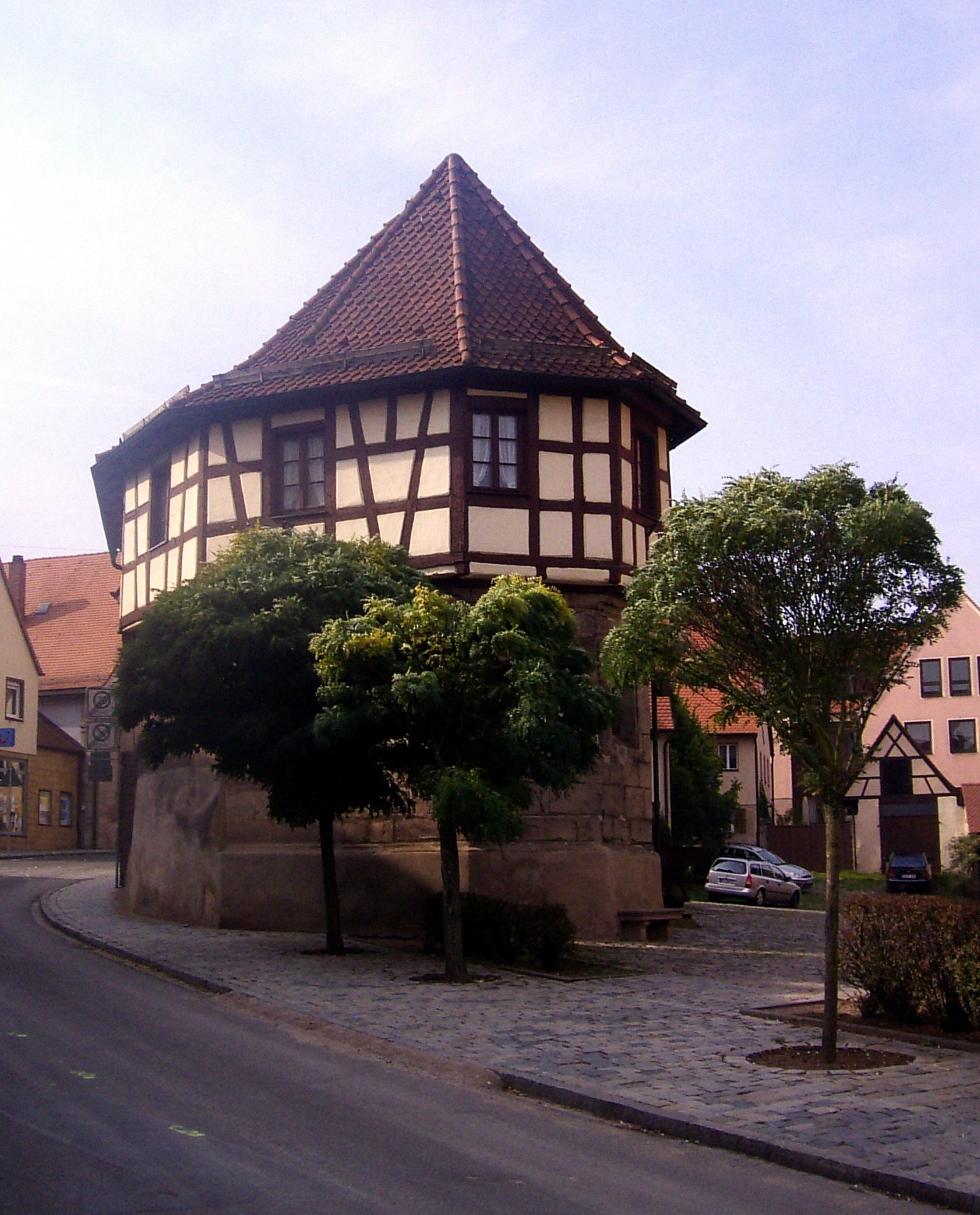
Local museum today

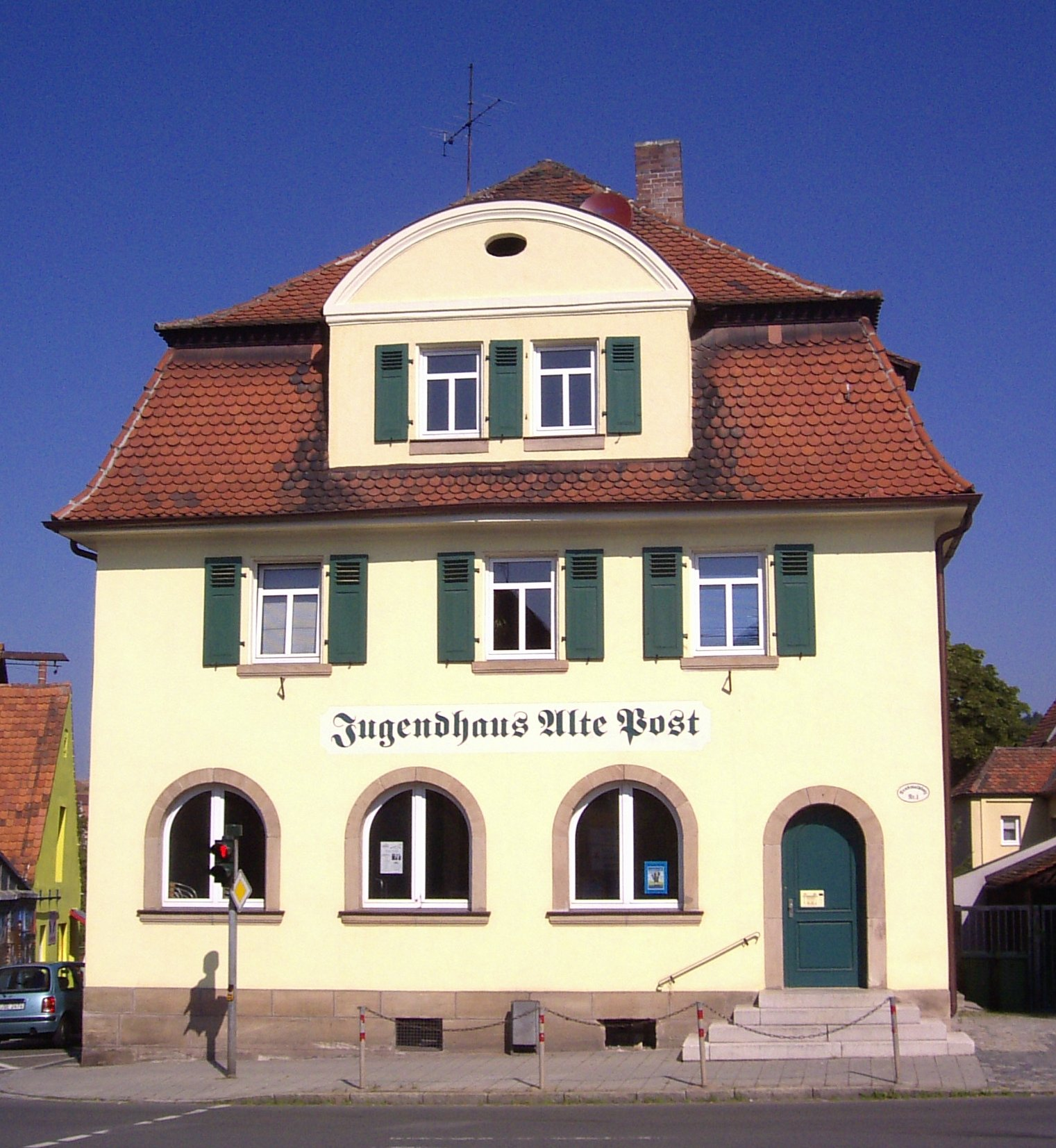
Alte Post

Since 1977 Langenzenn has an indoor swimming pool. The local museum opened in 1957. In 1382 a hospital was built. The oldest part still in existence dates from 1536. In 2007 the hospital was closed.

The Alte Post youth centre was founded in 1977 and is the oldest in the area. The public library was founded in 1903 and restored in 1983 and has c. 22,000 books.

== Education ==
Langenzenn has had a school system since 1439. Since 1967 it has also had an elementary and a Mittelschule (similar to a secondary modern school). In 1984 the Wolfang Borchert Gymnasium, which has room for 1150 pupils, was founded in Langenzenn. There is also a Realschule. Langenzenn also has 4 kindergartens.

== Residing companies ==
Bricks have been produced in Langenzenn since the 16th century. Since World War II only two companies have continued to produce bricks: The Koramic Dachprodukte GmbH & Co. KG belonging to the Wienerberger Group and the Walther Dachziegel GmbH.

The steel and metal wholesale company Heine + Beisswenger has business premises between Langenzenn and Burggrafenhof.

The packaginging producer ElringKlinger AG exports to many automobile companies. Production was closed here on October 1, 2023 and relocated abroad.

The ELIA Tuning und Design AG is a Renault, Nissan and Dacia tuning company.

Langenzenn has several industrial areas, with many smaller companies being located there.

== Media ==
The newspaper Langenzenner Zeitung is published every month.

== Sport ==
Langenzenn's main sports club is the TSV 1894 Langenzenn, supporting several sports but mainly soccer.

== Personalities ==
=== Sons and daughters of the city ===
- Marie Dollinger (1910-1995), athlete
- Brunhilde Hendrix (1938-1995), athlete

=== Other personalities associated with the city ===
- Sebastian Preiss (born 1981), grew up in Langenzenn, handball player
