= List of districts of Germany =

The sixteen constituent states of Germany are divided into a total of 401 administrative Kreis or Landkreis; these consist of 294 rural districts (German: Landkreise or Kreise – the latter in the states of North Rhine-Westphalia and Schleswig-Holstein only), and 107 urban districts (Kreisfreie Städte or, in Baden-Württemberg only, Stadtkreise – cities that constitute districts in their own right).

== List ==
District	Form	State	Capital
Aachen	Rural	North Rhine-Westphalia	Aachen
Aachen	Urban	North Rhine-Westphalia	
Ahrweiler	Rural	Rhineland-Palatinate	Bad Neuenahr-Ahrweiler
Aichach-Friedberg	Rural	Bavaria	Aichach
Alb-Donau-Kreis	Rural	Baden-Württemberg	Ulm
Altenburger Land	Rural	Thuringia	Altenburg
Altenkirchen	Rural	Rhineland-Palatinate	Altenkirchen
Altmarkkreis Salzwedel	Rural	Saxony-Anhalt	Salzwedel
Altötting	Rural	Bavaria	Altötting
Alzey-Worms	Rural	Rhineland-Palatinate	Alzey
Amberg	Urban	Bavaria	
Amberg-Sulzbach	Rural	Bavaria	Amberg
Ammerland	Rural	Lower Saxony	Westerstede
Anhalt-Bitterfeld	Rural	Saxony-Anhalt	Köthen (Anhalt)
Ansbach	Rural	Bavaria	Ansbach
Ansbach	Urban	Bavaria	
Aschaffenburg	Rural	Bavaria	Aschaffenburg
Aschaffenburg	Urban	Bavaria	
Augsburg	Rural	Bavaria	Augsburg
Augsburg	Urban	Bavaria	
Aurich	Rural	Lower Saxony	Aurich
Bad Dürkheim	Rural	Rhineland-Palatinate	Bad Dürkheim
Bad Kissingen	Rural	Bavaria	Bad Kissingen
Bad Kreuznach	Rural	Rhineland-Palatinate	Bad Kreuznach
Bad Tölz-Wolfratshausen	Rural	Bavaria	Bad Tölz
Baden-Baden	Urban	Baden-Württemberg	
Bamberg	Rural	Bavaria	Bamberg
Bamberg	Urban	Bavaria	
Barnim	Rural	Brandenburg	Eberswalde
Bautzen	Rural	Saxony	Bautzen
Bayreuth	Rural	Bavaria	Bayreuth
Bayreuth	Urban	Bavaria	
Berchtesgadener Land	Rural	Bavaria	Bad Reichenhall
Bergstraße	Rural	Hesse	Heppenheim
Berlin	Urban	Berlin	
Bernkastel-Wittlich	Rural	Rhineland-Palatinate	Wittlich
Biberach	Rural	Baden-Württemberg	Biberach
Bielefeld	Urban	North Rhine-Westphalia	
Birkenfeld	Rural	Rhineland-Palatinate	Birkenfeld
Böblingen	Rural	Baden-Württemberg	Böblingen
Bochum	Urban	North Rhine-Westphalia	
Bodenseekreis	Rural	Baden-Württemberg	Friedrichshafen
Bonn	Urban	North Rhine-Westphalia	
Börde	Rural	Saxony-Anhalt	Haldensleben
Borken	Rural	North Rhine-Westphalia	Borken
Bottrop	Urban	North Rhine-Westphalia	
Brandenburg an der Havel	Urban	Brandenburg	
Braunschweig	Urban	Lower Saxony	
Breisgau-Hochschwarzwald	Rural	Baden-Württemberg	Freiburg
Bremen	Urban	Bremen	
Bremerhaven	Urban	Bremen	
Burgenlandkreis	Rural	Saxony-Anhalt	Naumburg
Calw	Rural	Baden-Württemberg	Calw
Celle	Rural	Lower Saxony	Celle
Cham	Rural	Bavaria	Cham
Chemnitz	Urban	Saxony	
Cleves (Kleve)	Rural	North Rhine-Westphalia	Cleves (Kleve)
Cloppenburg	Rural	Lower Saxony	Cloppenburg
Coburg	Rural	Bavaria	Coburg
Coburg	Urban	Bavaria	
Cochem-Zell	Rural	Rhineland-Palatinate	Cochem
Coesfeld	Rural	North Rhine-Westphalia	Coesfeld
Cologne (Köln)	Urban	North Rhine-Westphalia	
Cottbus	Urban	Brandenburg	
Cuxhaven	Rural	Lower Saxony	Cuxhaven
Dachau	Rural	Bavaria	Dachau
Dahme-Spreewald	Rural	Brandenburg	Lübben
Darmstadt	Urban	Hesse	
Darmstadt-Dieburg	Rural	Hesse	Darmstadt
Deggendorf	Rural	Bavaria	Deggendorf
Delmenhorst	Urban	Lower Saxony	
Dessau-Roßlau	Urban	Saxony-Anhalt	
Diepholz	Rural	Lower Saxony	Diepholz
Dillingen	Rural	Bavaria	Dillingen
Dingolfing-Landau	Rural	Bavaria	Dingolfing
Dithmarschen	Rural	Schleswig-Holstein	Heide
Donau-Ries	Rural	Bavaria	Donauwörth
Donnersbergkreis	Rural	Rhineland-Palatinate	Kirchheimbolanden
Dortmund	Urban	North Rhine-Westphalia	
Dresden	Urban	Saxony	
Duisburg	Urban	North Rhine-Westphalia	
Düren	Rural	North Rhine-Westphalia	Düren
Düsseldorf	Urban	North Rhine-Westphalia	
Ebersberg	Rural	Bavaria	Ebersberg
Eichsfeld	Rural	Thuringia	Heilbad Heiligenstadt
Eichstätt	Rural	Bavaria	Eichstätt
Eifelkreis Bitburg-Prüm	Rural	Rhineland-Palatinate	Bitburg
Elbe-Elster	Rural	Brandenburg	Herzberg
Emden	Urban	Lower Saxony	
Emmendingen	Rural	Baden-Württemberg	Emmendingen
Emsland	Rural	Lower Saxony	Meppen
Ennepe-Ruhr-Kreis	Rural	North Rhine-Westphalia	Schwelm
Enzkreis	Rural	Baden-Württemberg	Pforzheim
Erding	Rural	Bavaria	Erding
Erfurt	Urban	Thuringia	
Erlangen	Urban	Bavaria	
Erlangen-Höchstadt	Rural	Bavaria	Erlangen
Erzgebirgskreis	Rural	Saxony	Annaberg-Buchholz
Essen	Urban	North Rhine-Westphalia	
Esslingen	Rural	Baden-Württemberg	Esslingen am Neckar
Euskirchen	Rural	North Rhine-Westphalia	Euskirchen
Flensburg	Urban	Schleswig-Holstein	
Forchheim	Rural	Bavaria	Forchheim
Frankenthal	Urban	Rhineland-Palatinate	
Frankfurt am Main	Urban	Hesse	
Frankfurt an der Oder	Urban	Brandenburg	
Freiburg im Breisgau	Urban	Baden-Württemberg	
Freising	Rural	Bavaria	Freising
Freudenstadt	Rural	Baden-Württemberg	Freudenstadt
Freyung-Grafenau	Rural	Bavaria	Freyung
Friesland	Rural	Lower Saxony	Jever
Fulda	Rural	Hesse	Fulda
Fürstenfeldbruck	Rural	Bavaria	Fürstenfeldbruck
Fürth	Rural	Bavaria	Zirndorf
Fürth	Urban	Bavaria	
Garmisch-Partenkirchen	Rural	Bavaria	Garmisch-Partenkirchen
Gelsenkirchen	Urban	North Rhine-Westphalia	
Gera	Urban	Thuringia	
Germersheim	Rural	Rhineland-Palatinate	Germersheim
Gießen	Rural	Hesse	Gießen
Gifhorn	Rural	Lower Saxony	Gifhorn
Göppingen	Rural	Baden-Württemberg	Göppingen
Görlitz	Rural	Saxony	Görlitz
Goslar	Rural	Lower Saxony	Goslar
Gotha	Rural	Thuringia	Gotha
Göttingen	Rural	Lower Saxony	Göttingen
Göttingen	Urban	Lower Saxony	
Grafschaft Bentheim	Rural	Lower Saxony	Nordhorn
Greiz	Rural	Thuringia	Greiz
Groß-Gerau	Rural	Hesse	Groß-Gerau
Günzburg	Rural	Bavaria	Günzburg
Gütersloh	Rural	North Rhine-Westphalia	Gütersloh
Hagen	Urban	North Rhine-Westphalia	
Halle	Urban	Saxony-Anhalt	
Hamburg	Urban	Hamburg	
Hameln-Pyrmont (Hameln-Pyrmont)	Rural	Lower Saxony	Hamelin (Hameln)
Hamm	Urban	North Rhine-Westphalia	
Hanau	Urban	Hesse	
Hanover (Hannover)	Rural	Lower Saxony	Hanover (Hannover)
Hanover	Urban	Lower Saxony	
Harburg	Rural	Lower Saxony	Winsen
Harz	Rural	Saxony-Anhalt	Halberstadt
Haßberge	Rural	Bavaria	Haßfurt
Havelland	Rural	Brandenburg	Rathenow
Heidekreis	Rural	Lower Saxony	Bad Fallingbostel
Heidelberg	Urban	Baden-Württemberg	
Heidenheim	Rural	Baden-Württemberg	Heidenheim
Heilbronn	Rural	Baden-Württemberg	Heilbronn
Heilbronn	Urban	Baden-Württemberg	
Heinsberg	Rural	North Rhine-Westphalia	Heinsberg
Helmstedt	Rural	Lower Saxony	Helmstedt
Herford	Rural	North Rhine-Westphalia	Herford
Herne	Urban	North Rhine-Westphalia	
Hersfeld-Rotenburg	Rural	Hesse	Bad Hersfeld
Herzogtum Lauenburg	Rural	Schleswig-Holstein	Ratzeburg
Hildburghausen	Rural	Thuringia	Hildburghausen
Hildesheim	Rural	Lower Saxony	Hildesheim
Hochsauerlandkreis	Rural	North Rhine-Westphalia	Meschede
Hochtaunuskreis	Rural	Hesse	Bad Homburg
Hof	Rural	Bavaria	Hof
Hof	Urban	Bavaria	
Hohenlohe	Rural	Baden-Württemberg	Künzelsau
Holzminden	Rural	Lower Saxony	Holzminden
Höxter	Rural	North Rhine-Westphalia	Höxter
Ilm-Kreis	Rural	Thuringia	Arnstadt
Ingolstadt	Urban	Bavaria	
Jena	Urban	Thuringia	
Jerichower Land	Rural	Saxony-Anhalt	Burg
Kaiserslautern	Rural	Rhineland-Palatinate	Kaiserslautern
Kaiserslautern	Urban	Rhineland-Palatinate	
Karlsruhe	Rural	Baden-Württemberg	Karlsruhe
Karlsruhe	Urban	Baden-Württemberg	
Kassel	Rural	Hesse	Kassel
Kassel	Urban	Hesse	
Kaufbeuren	Urban	Bavaria	
Kelheim	Rural	Bavaria	Kelheim
Kempten	Urban	Bavaria	
Kiel	Urban	Schleswig-Holstein	
Kitzingen	Rural	Bavaria	Kitzingen
Koblenz	Urban	Rhineland-Palatinate	
Konstanz	Rural	Baden-Württemberg	Konstanz
Krefeld	Urban	North Rhine-Westphalia	
Kronach	Rural	Bavaria	Kronach
Kulmbach	Rural	Bavaria	Kulmbach
Kusel	Rural	Rhineland-Palatinate	Kusel
Kyffhäuserkreis	Rural	Thuringia	Sondershausen
Lahn-Dill-Kreis	Rural	Hesse	Wetzlar
Landau	Urban	Rhineland-Palatinate	
Landsberg	Rural	Bavaria	Landsberg
Landshut	Rural	Bavaria	Landshut
Landshut	Urban	Bavaria	
Leer	Rural	Lower Saxony	Leer
Leipzig	Rural	Saxony	Borna
Leipzig	Urban	Saxony	
Leverkusen	Urban	North Rhine-Westphalia	
Lichtenfels	Rural	Bavaria	Lichtenfels
Limburg-Weilburg	Rural	Hesse	Limburg
Lindau	Rural	Bavaria	Lindau
Lippe	Rural	North Rhine-Westphalia	Detmold
Lörrach	Rural	Baden-Württemberg	Lörrach
Lübeck	Urban	Schleswig-Holstein	
Lüchow-Dannenberg	Rural	Lower Saxony	Lüchow
Ludwigsburg	Rural	Baden-Württemberg	Ludwigsburg
Ludwigshafen	Urban	Rhineland-Palatinate	
Ludwigslust-Parchim	Rural	Mecklenburg-Vorpommern	Parchim
Lüneburg	Rural	Lower Saxony	Lüneburg
Magdeburg	Urban	Saxony-Anhalt	
Main-Kinzig-Kreis	Rural	Hesse	Gelnhausen
Main-Spessart	Rural	Bavaria	Karlstadt am Main
Main-Tauber-Kreis	Rural	Baden-Württemberg	Tauberbischofsheim
Main-Taunus-Kreis	Rural	Hesse	Hofheim
Mainz	Urban	Rhineland-Palatinate	
Mainz-Bingen	Rural	Rhineland-Palatinate	Ingelheim
Mannheim	Urban	Baden-Württemberg	
Mansfeld-Südharz	Rural	Saxony-Anhalt	Sangerhausen
Marburg-Biedenkopf	Rural	Hesse	Marburg
Märkischer Kreis	Rural	North Rhine-Westphalia	Lüdenscheid
Märkisch-Oderland	Rural	Brandenburg	Seelow
Mayen-Koblenz	Rural	Rhineland-Palatinate	Koblenz
Mecklenburgische Seenplatte	Rural	Mecklenburg-Vorpommern	Neubrandenburg
Meißen	Rural	Saxony	Meißen
Memmingen	Urban	Bavaria	
Merzig-Wadern	Rural	Saarland	Merzig
Mettmann	Rural	North Rhine-Westphalia	Mettmann
Miesbach	Rural	Bavaria	Miesbach
Miltenberg	Rural	Bavaria	Miltenberg
Minden-Lübbecke	Rural	North Rhine-Westphalia	Minden
Mittelsachsen	Rural	Saxony	Freiberg
Mönchengladbach	Urban	North Rhine-Westphalia	
Mühldorf	Rural	Bavaria	Mühldorf
Mülheim an der Ruhr	Urban	North Rhine-Westphalia	
Munich (München)	Rural	Bavaria	Munich (München)
Munich	Urban	Bavaria	
Münster	Urban	North Rhine-Westphalia	
Neckar-Odenwald-Kreis	Rural	Baden-Württemberg	Mosbach
Neuburg-Schrobenhausen	Rural	Bavaria	Neuburg
Neumarkt	Rural	Bavaria	Neumarkt in der Oberpfalz
Neumünster	Urban	Schleswig-Holstein	
Neunkirchen	Rural	Saarland	Ottweiler
Neustadt (Aisch)-Bad Windsheim	Rural	Bavaria	Neustadt (Aisch)
Neustadt an der Weinstraße	Urban	Rhineland-Palatinate	
Neustadt an der Waldnaab	Rural	Bavaria	Neustadt an der Waldnaab
Neu-Ulm	Rural	Bavaria	Neu-Ulm
Neuwied	Rural	Rhineland-Palatinate	Neuwied
Nienburg	Rural	Lower Saxony	Nienburg
Nordfriesland	Rural	Schleswig-Holstein	Husum
Nordhausen	Rural	Thuringia	Nordhausen
Nordsachsen	Rural	Saxony	Torgau
Nordwestmecklenburg	Rural	Mecklenburg-Vorpommern	Wismar
Northeim	Rural	Lower Saxony	Northeim
Nuremberg (Nürnberg)	Urban	Bavaria	
Nürnberger Land	Rural	Bavaria	Lauf an der Pegnitz
Oberallgäu	Rural	Bavaria	Sonthofen
Oberbergischer Kreis	Rural	North Rhine-Westphalia	Gummersbach
Oberhausen	Urban	North Rhine-Westphalia	
Oberhavel	Rural	Brandenburg	Oranienburg
Oberspreewald-Lausitz	Rural	Brandenburg	Senftenberg
Odenwaldkreis	Rural	Hesse	Erbach
Oder-Spree	Rural	Brandenburg	Beeskow
Offenbach	Rural	Hesse	Dietzenbach
Offenbach am Main	Urban	Hesse	
Oldenburg	Rural	Lower Saxony	Wildeshausen
Oldenburg	Urban	Lower Saxony	
Olpe	Rural	North Rhine-Westphalia	Olpe
Ortenaukreis	Rural	Baden-Württemberg	Offenburg
Osnabrück	Rural	Lower Saxony	Osnabrück
Osnabrück	Urban	Lower Saxony	
Ostalbkreis	Rural	Baden-Württemberg	Aalen
Ostallgäu	Rural	Bavaria	Marktoberdorf
Osterholz	Rural	Lower Saxony	Osterholz-Scharmbeck
Ostholstein	Rural	Schleswig-Holstein	Eutin
Ostprignitz-Ruppin	Rural	Brandenburg	Neuruppin
Paderborn	Rural	North Rhine-Westphalia	Paderborn
Passau	Rural	Bavaria	Passau
Passau	Urban	Bavaria	
Peine	Rural	Lower Saxony	Peine
Pfaffenhofen	Rural	Bavaria	Pfaffenhofen a.d.Ilm
Pforzheim	Urban	Baden-Württemberg	
Pinneberg	Rural	Schleswig-Holstein	Pinneberg
Pirmasens	Urban	Rhineland-Palatinate	
Plön	Rural	Schleswig-Holstein	Plön
Potsdam	Urban	Brandenburg	
Potsdam-Mittelmark	Rural	Brandenburg	Bad Belzig
Prignitz	Rural	Brandenburg	Perleberg
Rastatt	Rural	Baden-Württemberg	Rastatt
Ravensburg	Rural	Baden-Württemberg	Ravensburg
Recklinghausen	Rural	North Rhine-Westphalia	Recklinghausen
Regen	Rural	Bavaria	Regen
Regensburg	Rural	Bavaria	Regensburg
Regensburg	Urban	Bavaria	
Rems-Murr-Kreis	Rural	Baden-Württemberg	Waiblingen
Remscheid	Urban	North Rhine-Westphalia	
Rendsburg-Eckernförde	Rural	Schleswig-Holstein	Rendsburg
Reutlingen	Rural	Baden-Württemberg	Reutlingen
Rhein-Erft-Kreis	Rural	North Rhine-Westphalia	Bergheim
Rheingau-Taunus-Kreis	Rural	Hesse	Bad Schwalbach
Rhein-Hunsrück-Kreis	Rural	Rhineland-Palatinate	Simmern
Rheinisch-Bergischer Kreis	Rural	North Rhine-Westphalia	Bergisch Gladbach
Rhein-Kreis Neuss	Rural	North Rhine-Westphalia	Neuss
Rhein-Lahn-Kreis	Rural	Rhineland-Palatinate	Bad Ems
Rhein-Neckar-Kreis	Rural	Baden-Württemberg	Heidelberg
Rhein-Pfalz-Kreis	Rural	Rhineland-Palatinate	Ludwigshafen
Rhein-Sieg-Kreis	Rural	North Rhine-Westphalia	Siegburg
Rhön-Grabfeld	Rural	Bavaria	Bad Neustadt
Rosenheim	Rural	Bavaria	Rosenheim
Rosenheim	Urban	Bavaria	
Rostock	Rural	Mecklenburg-Vorpommern	Güstrow
Rostock	Urban	Mecklenburg-Vorpommern	
Rotenburg	Rural	Lower Saxony	Rotenburg
Roth	Rural	Bavaria	Roth bei Nürnberg
Rottal-Inn	Rural	Bavaria	Pfarrkirchen
Rottweil	Rural	Baden-Württemberg	Rottweil
Saale-Holzland-Kreis	Rural	Thuringia	Eisenberg
Saalekreis	Rural	Saxony-Anhalt	Merseburg
Saale-Orla-Kreis	Rural	Thuringia	Schleiz
Saalfeld-Rudolstadt	Rural	Thuringia	Saalfeld
Saarbrücken	Rural	Saarland	Saarbrücken
Saarlouis	Rural	Saarland	Saarlouis
Saarpfalz	Rural	Saarland	Homburg
Sächsische Schweiz-Osterzgebirge	Rural	Saxony	Pirna
Salzgitter	Urban	Lower Saxony	
Salzlandkreis	Rural	Saxony-Anhalt	Bernburg
Sankt Wendel	Rural	Saarland	Sankt Wendel
Schaumburg	Rural	Lower Saxony	Stadthagen
Schleswig-Flensburg	Rural	Schleswig-Holstein	Schleswig
Schmalkalden-Meiningen	Rural	Thuringia	Meiningen
Schwabach	Urban	Bavaria	
Schwäbisch Hall	Rural	Baden-Württemberg	Schwäbisch Hall
Schwalm-Eder-Kreis	Rural	Hesse	Homberg
Schwandorf	Rural	Bavaria	Schwandorf
Schwarzwald-Baar-Kreis	Rural	Baden-Württemberg	Villingen-Schwenningen
Schweinfurt	Rural	Bavaria	Schweinfurt
Schweinfurt	Urban	Bavaria	
Schwerin	Urban	Mecklenburg-Vorpommern	
Segeberg	Rural	Schleswig-Holstein	Bad Segeberg
Siegen-Wittgenstein	Rural	North Rhine-Westphalia	Siegen
Sigmaringen	Rural	Baden-Württemberg	Sigmaringen
Soest	Rural	North Rhine-Westphalia	Soest
Solingen	Urban	North Rhine-Westphalia	
Sömmerda	Rural	Thuringia	Sömmerda
Sonneberg	Rural	Thuringia	Sonneberg
Speyer	Urban	Rhineland-Palatinate	
Spree-Neiße	Rural	Brandenburg	Forst
Stade	Rural	Lower Saxony	Stade
Starnberg	Rural	Bavaria	Starnberg
Steinburg	Rural	Schleswig-Holstein	Itzehoe
Steinfurt	Rural	North Rhine-Westphalia	Steinfurt
Stendal	Rural	Saxony-Anhalt	Stendal
Stormarn	Rural	Schleswig-Holstein	Bad Oldesloe
Straubing	Urban	Bavaria	
Straubing-Bogen	Rural	Bavaria	Straubing
Stuttgart	Urban	Baden-Württemberg	
Südliche Weinstraße	Rural	Rhineland-Palatinate	Landau
Südwestpfalz	Rural	Rhineland-Palatinate	Pirmasens
Suhl	Urban	Thuringia	
Teltow-Fläming	Rural	Brandenburg	Luckenwalde
Tirschenreuth	Rural	Bavaria	Tirschenreuth
Traunstein	Rural	Bavaria	Traunstein
Trier	Urban	Rhineland-Palatinate	
Trier-Saarburg	Rural	Rhineland-Palatinate	Trier
Tübingen	Rural	Baden-Württemberg	Tübingen
Tuttlingen	Rural	Baden-Württemberg	Tuttlingen
Uckermark	Rural	Brandenburg	Prenzlau
Uelzen	Rural	Lower Saxony	Uelzen
Ulm	Urban	Baden-Württemberg	
Unna	Rural	North Rhine-Westphalia	Unna
Unstrut-Hainich-Kreis	Rural	Thuringia	Mühlhausen
Unterallgäu	Rural	Bavaria	Mindelheim
Vechta	Rural	Lower Saxony	Vechta
Verden	Rural	Lower Saxony	Verden
Viersen	Rural	North Rhine-Westphalia	Viersen
Vogelsbergkreis	Rural	Hesse	Lauterbach
Vogtlandkreis	Rural	Saxony	Plauen
Vorpommern-Greifswald	Rural	Mecklenburg-Vorpommern	Greifswald
Vorpommern-Rügen	Rural	Mecklenburg-Vorpommern	Stralsund
Vulkaneifel	Rural	Rhineland-Palatinate	Daun
Waldeck-Frankenberg	Rural	Hesse	Korbach
Waldshut	Rural	Baden-Württemberg	Waldshut-Tiengen
Warendorf	Rural	North Rhine-Westphalia	Warendorf
Wartburgkreis	Rural	Thuringia	Eisenach
Weiden in der Oberpfalz	Urban	Bavaria	
Weilheim-Schongau	Rural	Bavaria	Weilheim
Weimar	Urban	Thuringia	
Weimarer Land	Rural	Thuringia	Apolda
Weißenburg-Gunzenhausen	Rural	Bavaria	Weißenburg
Werra-Meißner-Kreis	Rural	Hesse	Eschwege
Wesel	Rural	North Rhine-Westphalia	Wesel
Wesermarsch	Rural	Lower Saxony	Brake
Westerwaldkreis	Rural	Rhineland-Palatinate	Montabaur
Wetteraukreis	Rural	Hesse	Friedberg
Wiesbaden	Urban	Hesse	
Wilhelmshaven	Urban	Lower Saxony	
Wittenberg	Rural	Saxony-Anhalt	Wittenberg
Wittmund	Rural	Lower Saxony	Wittmund
Wolfenbüttel	Rural	Lower Saxony	Wolfenbüttel
Wolfsburg	Urban	Lower Saxony	
Worms	Urban	Rhineland-Palatinate	
Wunsiedel	Rural	Bavaria	Wunsiedel
Wuppertal	Urban	North Rhine-Westphalia	
Würzburg	Rural	Bavaria	Würzburg
Würzburg	Urban	Bavaria	
Zollernalbkreis	Rural	Baden-Württemberg	Balingen
Zweibrücken	Urban	Rhineland-Palatinate	
Zwickau	Rural	Saxony	Zwickau

== Historical ==
- Administrative divisions of East Germany
- Administrative divisions of Nazi Germany

== See also ==
- Districts of Germany
- States of Germany
- List of rural districts with populations and area (in German)
- List of urban districts with populations and area (in German)
