= Wilhermsdorf =

- Municipality
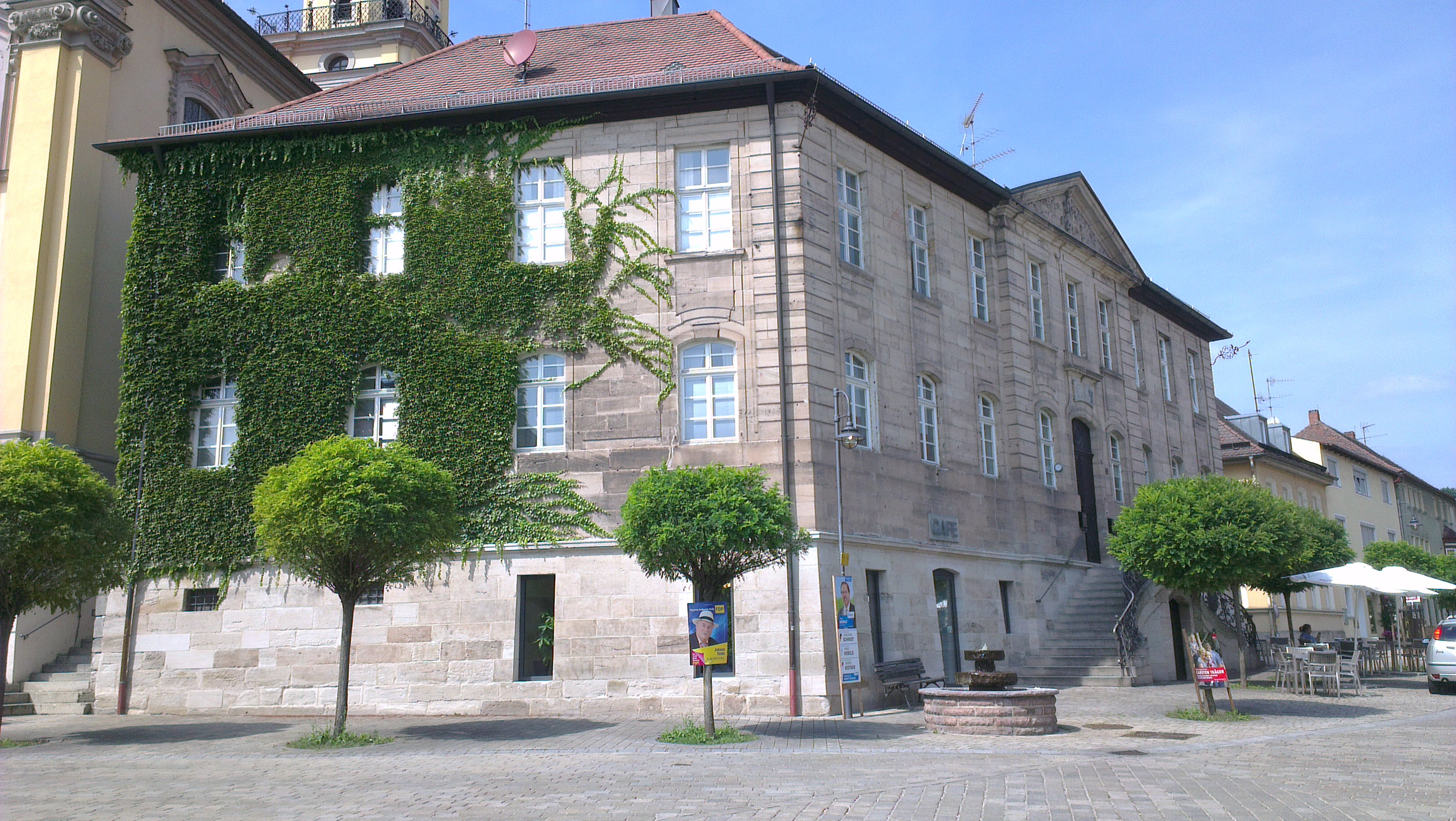
- Ritterhaus

- Coat of arms

- Location of Wilhermsdorf within Fürth district
- Interactive map of Wilhermsdorf
- Location within Germany Location within Bavaria
- Coordinates: 49°29′11″N 10°43′05″E
- Country: Germany
- State: Bavaria
- Admin. region: Mittelfranken
- District: Fürth
- Subdivisions: 10 Ortsteile

Government
  - Mayor (2020–26): Uwe Emmert (CSU)

Area
  - Total: 26.64 km^{2} (10.29 sq mi)
- Elevation: 322 m (1,056 ft)

Population (2025-12-31)
  - Total: 5,203
  - Density: 195.3/km^{2} (505.8/sq mi)
- Time zone: UTC+01:00 (CET)
  - Summer (DST): UTC+02:00 (CEST)
- Postal codes: 91452
- Dialling codes: 09102
- Vehicle registration: FÜ
- Website: www.markt-wilhermsdorf.de

Wilhermsdorf (German pronunciation: [ˈvɪlhɛʁmsˌdɔʁf]) is a municipality in the district of Fürth in Bavaria in Germany. As of 2020 it has a population of 5,479. It is twinned with Feld am See in Austria and Jahnsdorf, also in Germany.

== Neighboring municipalities ==
Wilhermsdorf borders

- Emskirchen
- Langenzenn
- Großhabersdorf
- Dietenhofen
- Neuhof an der Zenn
- Markt Erlbach
