= Stein, Bavaria =

Stein
- Town
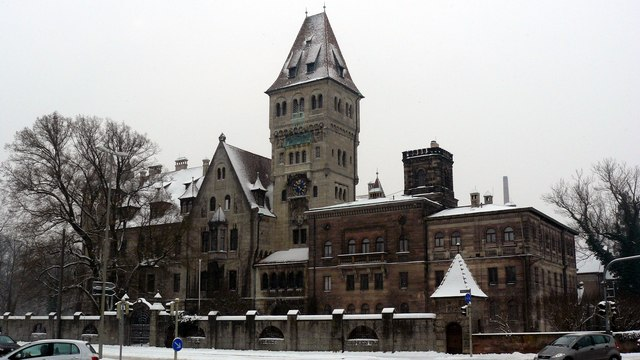
- The Faber-Castell Castle in Stein

- Coat of arms

- Location of Stein within Fürth district
- Interactive map of Stein
- Location within Germany Location within Bavaria
- Coordinates: 49°25′N 11°1′E
- Country: Germany
- State: Bavaria
- Admin. region: Mittelfranken
- District: Fürth
- Subdivisions: 11 Stadtteile

Government
  - Mayor (2020–26): Kurt Krömer

Area
  - Total: 19.51 km^{2} (7.53 sq mi)
- Elevation: 300–380 m (980–1,250 ft)

Population (2025-12-31)
  - Total: 14,997
  - Density: 768.7/km^{2} (1,991/sq mi)
- Time zone: UTC+01:00 (CET)
  - Summer (DST): UTC+02:00 (CEST)
- Postal codes: 90547
- Dialling codes: 0911
- Vehicle registration: FÜ
- Website: www.stadt-stein.de

Stein (German pronunciation: [ʃtaɪn]; East Franconian: Schdah) is a town in the district of Fürth, in Bavaria, Germany. It is situated 7 km south of Fürth, and 7 km southwest of Nuremberg (centre).

== Geography ==
Stein is located in the metropolitan area Nürnberg/Fürth/Erlangen in Middle Franconia, Bavaria and is a part of the district of Fürth. It adjoins to Nuremberg in the north-west and lies on the left bank of the river Rednitz. Neighboring municipalities are Nuremberg, Rohr, Roßtal, Zirndorf and Oberasbach.

Stein is divided into 11 districts:

- Stein
- Deutenbach
- Bertelsdorf
- Unterweihersbuch
- Oberweihersbuch
- Eckershof
- Gutzberg
- Loch
- Unterbüchlein
- Oberbüchlein
- Sichersdorf

== History ==
Stein has first been mentioned in a document dating back to 1296. The origin of the settlement is linked to the first Rednitzbrücke, a bridge which first crossed the river Rednitz. It was referred to as “Steinbruke” and probably caused the town's naming. In 1498, the two famous sculptors Veit Stoss and Adam Kraft were appointed as counselors for construction works on the bridge.

Between the 15th and the 17th century, Stein was completely destroyed three times. After the two Margrave Wars, which took place between 1449 and 1552, the city was left burned to ashes. In the summer of 1632, King Gustav Adolf of Sweden confronted Albrecht von Wallenstein near Zirndorf in the Battle of the Alte Veste, which was part of the Thirty Years' War. Stein was no setting of the battle but was devastated during the troop's retreat.

In 1660, the Old Church (Alte Kirche) was built.

Stein's history is closely linked to its pencil industry. The first manufacturers of pencils have already settled in the town in 1717. In 1761, the company A.W.Faber-Castell was founded in Stein by Kaspar Faber, a carpenter, who had moved there from Langenzenn a few years before. The castle is open for visitors on certain times a year.

In 1806, Stein became a part of the Kingdom of Bavaria.

In 1861, the Martin-Luther Church was inaugurated and in 1906, the construction of the new Faber-Castell Castle was finished. In the same year, the company Möbel Krügel was founded in Stein.

Due to the local government reform in Bavaria, Stein was integrated into the district of Fürth in 1972. Before, the City of Nuremberg had made several unsuccessful attempts to incorporate Stein.

Stein received its town charter in 1977.

== International relations ==
Stein is twinned with:

- Guéret, France (since July 8, 1990)
- Falkenstein, Germany (since November 9, 1990)
- Puck, Poland (since May 1, 2004)
- Makarska, Croatia (since 2024)

== Culture and leisure ==
=== Sights ===
In 1898, Ottilie von Faber married Count Alexander zu Castell-Rüdenhausen and a few years later, they decided to build a new castle, right next to the small old castle. The building work took only three years (1903 - 1906) and was supervised by Theodor von Kramer. The furniture features a combination of Historism and Jugendstil. Two rooms, which are especially remarkable, are the ladies and the gentlemen's bathrooms with sunken marble baths. During the two world wars, the castle remained mostly unharmed and was used as housing for international lawyers and journalists during the Nuremberg Trials. Reportedly, John Steinbeck and Ernest Hemingway resided there while writing for the US press. Nowadays, the castle is mainly used for cultural events and meetings. It is also used for weddings of the Faber-Castell family.

The Heimatmuseum (local museum) is located in the oldest building of the town. The house was built in 1635 and used to contain an inn. The city of Stein acquired and renovated it in 1988. The museum's exhibition consists of items on loan and donations by citizens and tries to reconstruct the history of craft, industry and family/community life. Its opening hours are from 1 to 5 pm, always on the third Sunday of the month and are accorded to the opening hours of the museum Alte Mine, which is run by Faber-Castell and which documents the historical development of lead production.

The Freiland-Aquarium and -Terrarium Stein is a small park where local flora and fauna are presented to visitors for free entrance. It is open on weekends and holidays from May to September and its focus lies on local reptiles, amphibians, fish, swamp and water plants.

The Palm Beach is a large spa that was built in 1979 and privatized in 1993. The facility includes a 25-meter sports pool, a pool with artificial waves, thermal baths, a beach bar and a large outside area. In December 2012, the Future world & Space Center, which includes twelve water slides, was opened. also called as "Kristall-Palm Beach".

=== Events ===
The Christmas Market in Stein takes place during the first weekend in Advent. On the first evening, school children walk with lanterns from the town hall to Mecklenburger Platz, where the mayor opens the market together with St. Nicolas and the Christkind. The booths usually represent the town's associations, unions or businesses.

The City Festival (Stadtfest) takes place every spring. The shops are open all weekend, and there is a stage with music and entertainment. The festival is accompanied by an arts exhibition in the town hall.

Every town district has its own church fair, which takes place between June and September.

== Education ==
Stein's Elementary School consists of three school buildings located in different districts of the town. They are located in Neuwerker Weg (Deutenbach), Mühlstraße (Stein) and Stuttgarter Straße (Oberweihersbuch). Directly next to the building in Neuwerker Weg, there is a Hauptschule (nowadays called Mittelschule Stein).

The Gymnasium in Stein was founded in 1982 and offers a mathematical/natural scientific and an economic/social branch to its students.

Further institutions of learning are the Adult high school (Volkshochschule) and the music school which offers a wide range of musical lessons.

== Infrastructure ==
Stein is located near the federal road Bundesstraße 14. The rush-hour traffic usually leads to long jams between Nuremberg and Stein, where the street becomes narrower. A motorway feeder, which is two kilometer away, links Stein to the autobahns A3, A6 and A9.

The city belongs to the Greater Nuremberg Transport Network (Verkehrsverbund Großraum Nürnberg) and is connected to Nuremberg's public transport system. The nearest Nuremberg U-Bahn station, Röthenbach station, can be reached by busses, which go every 5–10 minutes during weekdays. An extension of line U2 towards Stein has been proposed multiple times, as early as the first plans of the metro network, however, fears over the long term operational costs have led local politicians to oppose such an extension.

Stein has a railway station, which is located in Nuremberg-Gebersdorf, though.
