= Zirndorf =

- Town
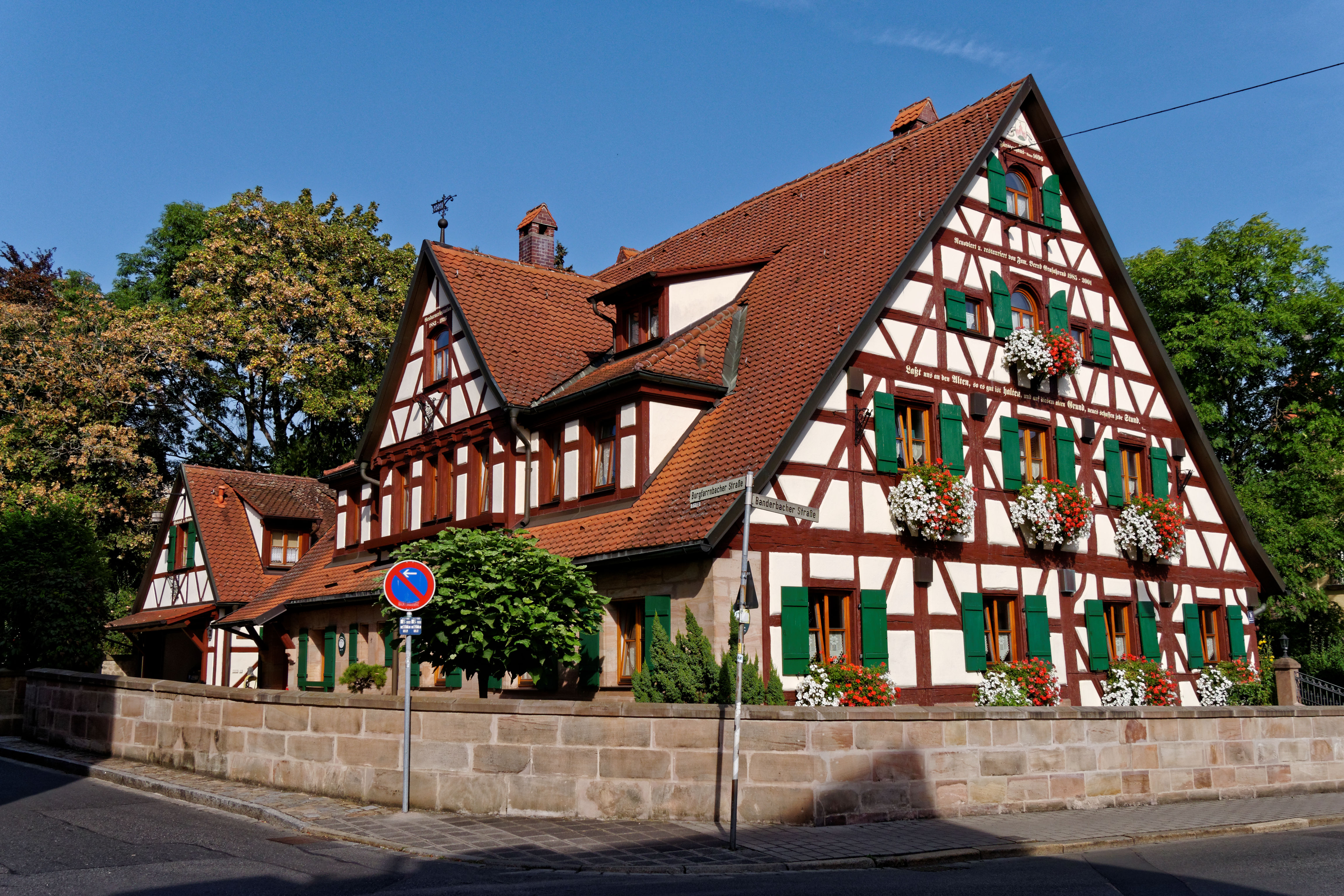
- Former House of Lords built in 1696

- Coat of arms

- Location of Zirndorf within Fürth district
- Interactive map of Zirndorf
- Location within Germany Location within Bavaria
- Coordinates: 49°27′N 10°57′E
- Country: Germany
- State: Bavaria
- Admin. region: Mittelfranken
- District: Fürth
- Subdivisions: 12 Stadtteile

Government
  - Mayor (2020–26): Thomas Zwingel (SPD)

Area
  - Total: 28.79 km^{2} (11.12 sq mi)
- Elevation: 306 m (1,004 ft)

Population (2025-12-31)
  - Total: 26,229
  - Density: 911.0/km^{2} (2,360/sq mi)
- Time zone: UTC+01:00 (CET)
  - Summer (DST): UTC+02:00 (CEST)
- Postal codes: 90513
- Dialling codes: 0911, 09127 (Wintersdorf, Weinzierlein)
- Vehicle registration: FÜ
- Website: www.zirndorf.de

Zirndorf (German pronunciation: [ˈtsɪʁndɔʁf]) is a town, which is part of the district of Fürth. It is located in northern Bavaria, Germany, in the Regierungsbezirk of Middle Franconia.

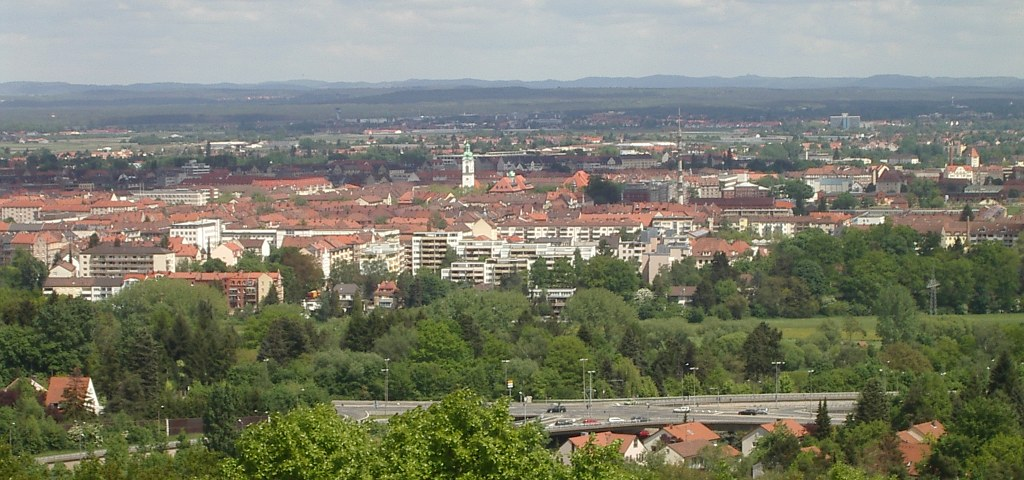
View of Fürth from Zirndorf

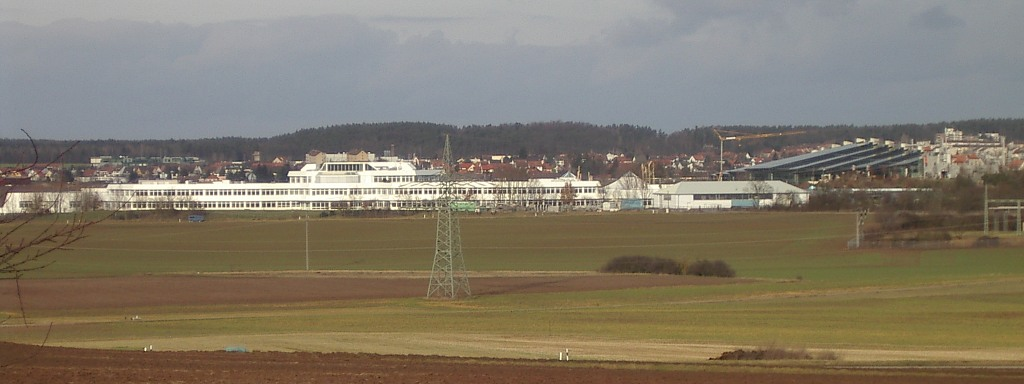
Playmobil factory in Zirndorf

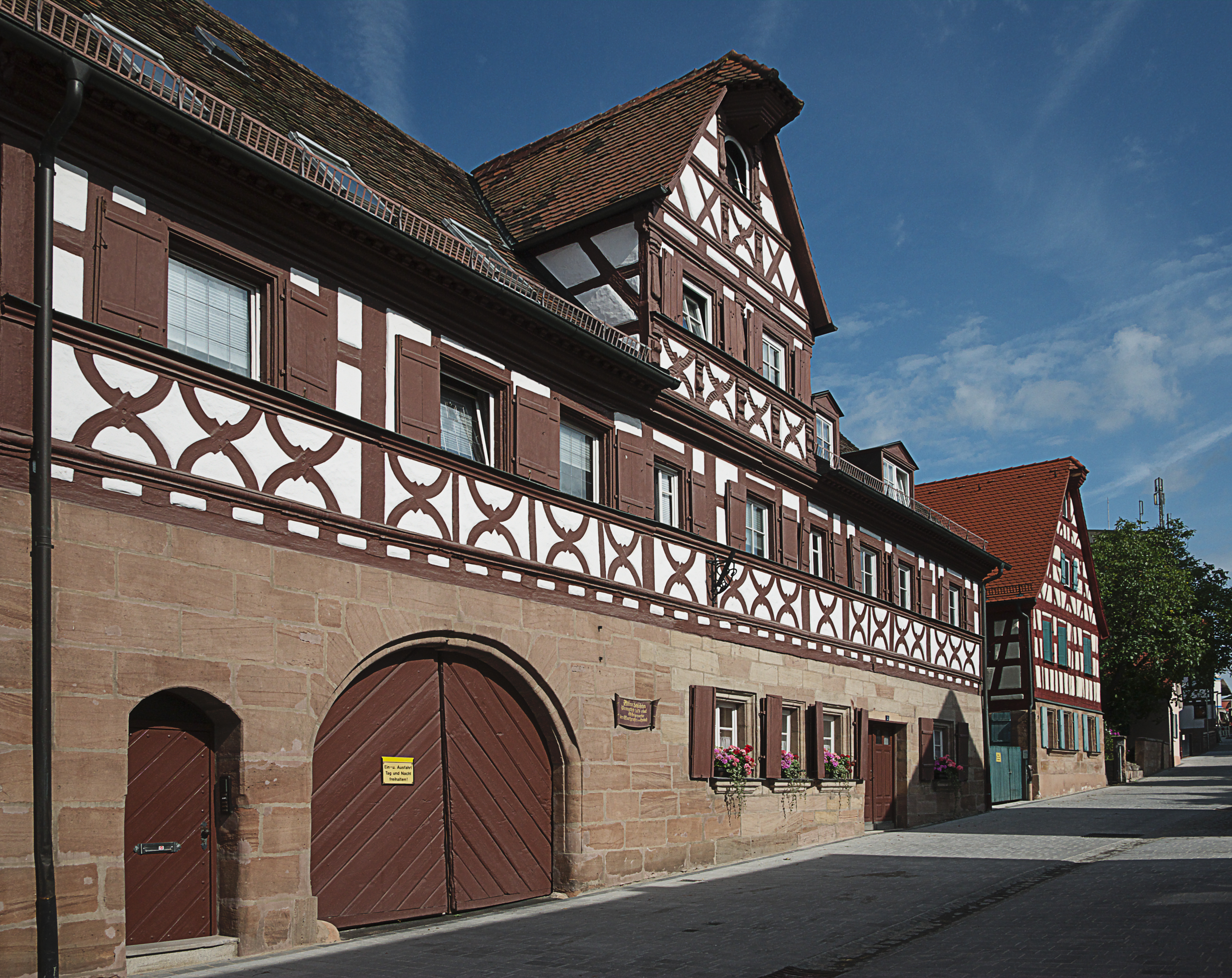
Old castle

== Neighbouring municipalities ==
The following towns and municipalities share borders with Zirndorf; they are listed in clockwise order, starting in the north:

- Fürth
- Oberasbach
- Stein
- Roßtal
- Ammerndorf
- Cadolzburg

== History ==
The first mention of the town occurs in a document dated 9 September 1297. The town was virtually destroyed during the Thirty Years' War, though the brewing industry established in the late seventeenth century helped in its recovery. In the mid-nineteenth century, the toy industry contributed to the town’s industrial development, and remains important today.

== Pinder Barracks ==
In 1935 the city of Zirndorf applied to the German Reich Administration to have a caserne built here. The application was approved, with the condition of Reichsmarschall Hermann Göring, that construction must be in the Franconian style. The plans were prepared by the Construction Office of the German Air Force, and work began on the Barracks in the spring of 1938. It was completed in mid-1940. This Spotlight and Anti-Aircraft Barracks as it was then called, was one of the best military training barracks in the Third Reich.

In 1945, soldiers of the U.S. 26th Infantry Regiment occupied the barracks. On 11 May 1949, this barracks was renamed in honor of John J. Pinder Jr., an American soldier who fell in a battle near Colleville-sur-Mer, France, on 6 June 1944. For his bravery, he was posthumously awarded the Medal of Honor.

In the decades since 1945, many American units were stationed at Pinder Barracks. The 22nd Artillery Battalion of the Fourth Armored Division was based there in the late 1950s. The 1st Armored Division's Divisional Artillery (DIVARTY) called Zirndorf home from 1971 until shortly after the Gulf War in 1991. Shortly thereafter, the Army and Air Force Exchange Service, Europe (AAFES-Europe), headquartered their operations at Pinder Barracks. In the fall of 1993, the 7th Corps Support Group moved its home to Pinder Barracks as well. Within the departure of AAFES-Europe and the 7th Corps Support Group, the chapter of America's presence in Zirndorf came to a close.

Although these barracks were abandoned in the years after 1999, the name Pinder remained by decision of the city administration as the newly formed city district "Pinder Park".

== Economy ==
The Brandstätter Group, producer of the Playmobil line of toys, is headquartered in Zirndorf, which also features a Playmobil Funpark. Metz has its head office in Zirndorf.

== Sport ==
The towns association football club, ASV Zirndorf, experienced its greatest success in the 1960s when it spent four seasons in the third division Bayernliga.

== Twin towns – sister cities ==
Zirndorf is twinned with:

- Bourganeuf, France
- Koppl, Austria
- Wintersdorf (Meuselwitz), Germany

== Notable people ==
- Walter Mayer (1926–2015), physicist, television pioneer; lived and died in Zirndorf
- Helmut Jahn (1940–2021), architect
- Gabriele Pauli (born 1957), politician; attended the primary school in Zirndorf
- Sylke Otto (born 1969), luger, Olympic champion; lives here, since 2008 member of the Zirndorf town council
- Schwabacher Brothers

=== Honorary citizen ===
- Horst Brandstätter (1933–2015), entrepreneur of the brand Playmobil
