= Veitsbronn (Verwaltungsgemeinschaft) =

- Verwaltungsgemeinschaft
- Location of Veitsbronn within Fürth district
- Interactive map of Veitsbronn
- Location within Germany Location within Bavaria
- Coordinates: 49°30′N 10°53′E
- Country: Germany
- State: Bavaria
- Admin. region: Middle Franconia
- District: Fürth
- Seat: Veitsbronn
- Subdivisions: 2 municipalities

Area
  - Total: 24.66 km^{2} (9.52 sq mi)

Population (2025-12-31)
  - Total: 9,405
  - Density: 381.4/km^{2} (987.8/sq mi)
- Time zone: UTC+01:00 (CET)
  - Summer (DST): UTC+02:00 (CEST)
- Website: www.veitsbronn.de

Veitsbronn is a Verwaltungsgemeinschaft (municipal association) in the district of Fürth in Bavaria, Germany. Its seat is in Veitsbronn.

It consists of the following municipalities:

1. Seukendorf
2. Veitsbronn
