= Markt Erlbach =

- Municipality
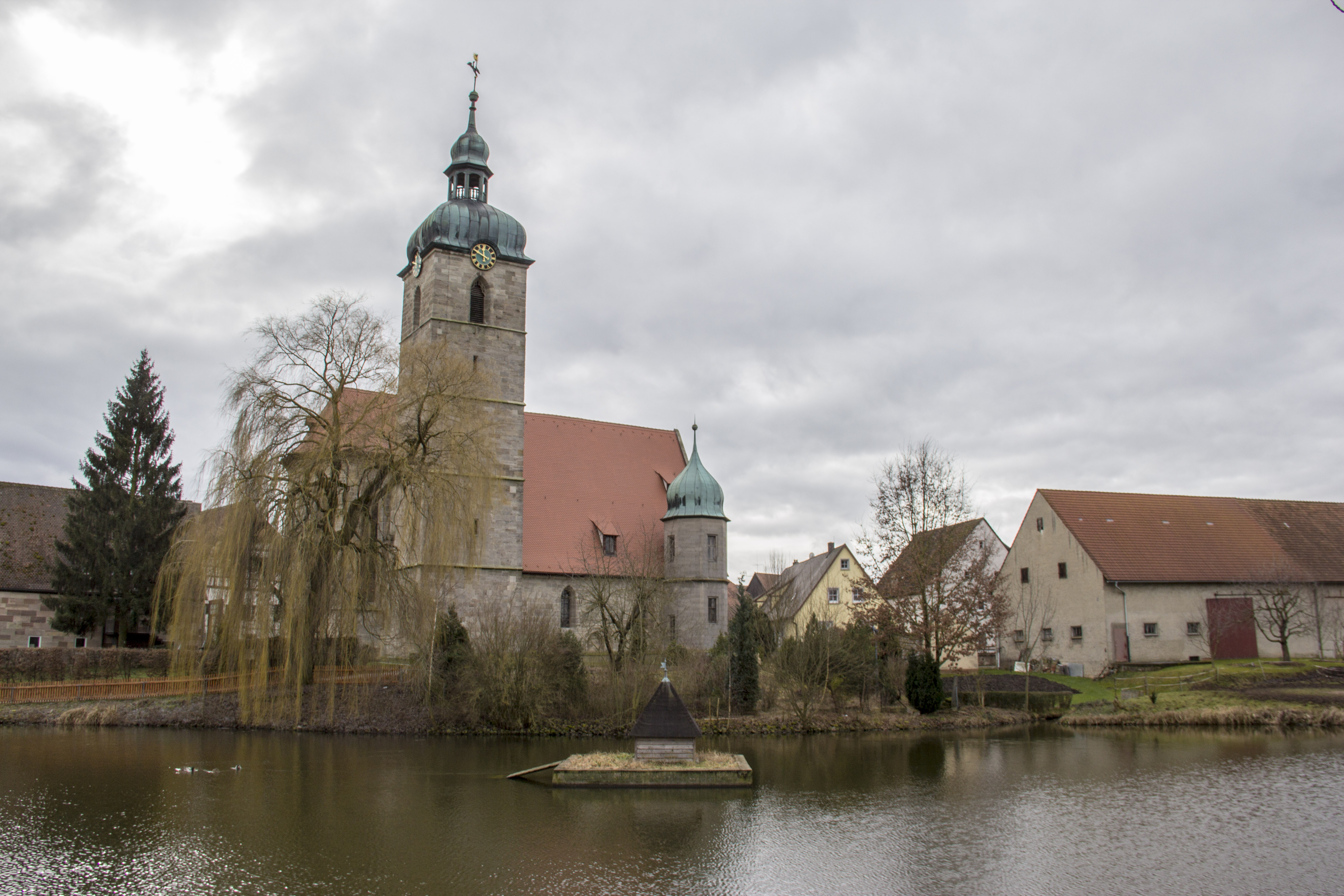
- St. Kilian Church, Markt Erlbach

- Coat of arms

- Location of Markt Erlbach within Neustadt a.d.Aisch-Bad Windsheim district
- Interactive map of Markt Erlbach
- Location within Germany Location within Bavaria
- Coordinates: 49°29′N 10°39′E
- Country: Germany
- State: Bavaria
- Admin. region: Mittelfranken
- District: Neustadt a.d.Aisch-Bad Windsheim
- Subdivisions: 22 Ortsteile

Government
  - Mayor (2020–26): Birgit Kreß (FW)

Area
  - Total: 60.90 km^{2} (23.51 sq mi)
- Elevation: 385 m (1,263 ft)

Population (2025-12-31)
  - Total: 5,540
  - Density: 91.0/km^{2} (236/sq mi)
- Time zone: UTC+01:00 (CET)
  - Summer (DST): UTC+02:00 (CEST)
- Postal codes: 91459
- Dialling codes: 09106
- Vehicle registration: NEA
- Website: www.markt-erlbach.de

Markt Erlbach is a municipality in the district of Neustadt (Aisch)-Bad Windsheim in Bavaria, Germany.

While "Markt" is a title given since the Middle Ages to towns that are allowed to hold a market (see Marktrecht), in the case of Markt Erlbach, "Markt" is part of the name, so with its title the town is called "Markt Markt Erlbach".

== Geography ==
=== Geographical Location ===
Markt Erlbach, with an area of almost 61 km² (23.5 mi²), is the fifth largest municipality in the district Neustadt (Aisch)-Bad Windsheim. The town lies on the high plateau of the Franconian Heights, approximately 30 km (20 mi) west of Nuremberg.

=== Neighboring Municipalities ===
Neighboring municipalities are (starting from the north and proceeding clockwise):

- Emskirchen
- Wilhermsdorf
- Neuhof an der Zenn
- Trautskirchen
- Bad Windsheim
- Ipsheim
- Dietersheim
- Neustadt an der Aisch

=== Municipal Subdivisions ===
The municipality consists of 33 subdivisions (the settlement type is indicated in parentheses):

- Altselingsbach (village)
- Altziegenrück (village)
- Blümleinsmühle (hamlet)
- Buchen (village)
- Eschenbach (village)
- Fallhaus (isolated hamlet)
- Haaghof (isolated hamlet)
- Hagenhofen (village)
- Haidt (hamlet)
- Häringsmühle (village)
- Holzmühle (isolated hamlet)
- Jobstgreuth (church village)
- Kappersberg (village)
- Kemmathen (hamlet)
- Klausaurach (village)
- Knochenhof (isolated hamlet)
- Kotzenaurach (village)
- Linden (parish village)
- Losaurach (village)
- Markt Erlbach (main town)
- Mettelaurach (village)
- Mittelmühle (isolated hamlet)
- Morbach (hamlet)
- Mosbach (village)
- Oberulsenbach (village)
- Pilsenmühle (isolated village)
- Rimbach (village)
- Röschenmühle (isolated iillage)
- Siedelbach (village)
- Waldhaus (isolated village)
- Wasserhaus (isolated village)
- Wilhelmsgreuth (village)
- Ziegelhütte (isolated village)

== History ==
=== Origin of Name ===
The village was first mentioned in writing in 1132 as "Erlehe". The former royal estate had already separated from the royal estate of Riedfeld before 800. The village name is derived from a field name of the same name. It consists of Erle with the collective suffix -(e)he and means alder grove. The original village name was last documented as "Erlahe" in 1169. As early as 1136, the village was called "Erlebach", i.e., with reference to the stream. The form "Markterlbach" has been documented since 1350. In 1911, the official name of the municipality was changed from Erlbach to Markt Erlbach.

=== Middle Ages ===
An early church foundation, from which many branch churches originated, and its location on the military road between the imperial cities of Nuremberg, Bad Windsheim, and Rothenburg ob der Tauber led Markt Erlbach through a turbulent history, but were also prerequisites for its development into a center for crafts, trade, and jurisdiction. The first documented mention dates back to a charter of foundation for Heilsbronn Monastery from 1132. By 1144, a church in Erlbach was already mentioned, which, according to tradition, was consecrated as early as 750 by Burkard, Würzburg's first bishop, and was replaced by a new building before 815 by Abbot Ratger of Fulda, in whose sphere of influence Erlbach belonged. From 1282, Erlbach was ruled by the Burgraves of Nuremberg, who administered it from the vice-dom seat of Neustadt. In 1384, Erlbach was described as an "oppidum," a fortified town, and its seal bore the Hohenzollern coat of arms (a hound's head on a black and white shield). See also the depiction in the church window of St. Kilian's Church from 1380. During the time of the stem duchies, the town lay within the Duchy of Franconia.

=== Modern Era ===
The Reformation was introduced in Markt Erlbach under the patronage of the local pastor, Hans Röschlein, and the patronage of Heilsbronn Abbey, whose prior and later abbot, Johann Schopper, was a member of the Ansbach visitation committee. The reformer Caspar Löner, who was born there, likely exerted his influence within the deanery.

After the devastation of the Thirty Years' War, particularly from the autumn of 1631 onward by marauding mercenaries, numerous Austrian religious refugees settled in and around Markt Erlbach, contributing to the town's economic recovery.

Toward the end of the 18th century, there were 101 properties in Markt Erlbach. High jurisdiction was exercised by the Brandenburg-Bayreuth town bailiwick of Markt Erlbach. Village and municipal authority was held by the Markt Erlbach council. All properties had the Principality of Bayreuth as their landlord.

== Politics ==
=== Mayor ===
Birgit Kreß was elected in 2008 as the new mayor.
