= Puschendorf =

- Municipality
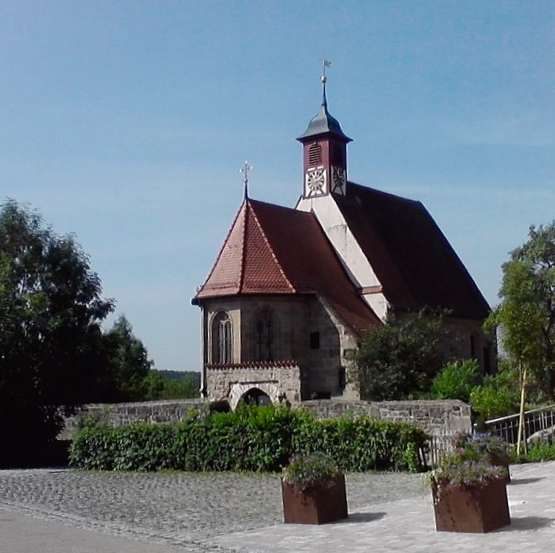
- Church of Saint Wolfgang

- Coat of arms

- Location of Puschendorf within Fürth district
- Interactive map of Puschendorf
- Location within Germany Location within Bavaria
- Coordinates: 49°31′N 10°49′E
- Country: Germany
- State: Bavaria
- Admin. region: Mittelfranken
- District: Fürth

Government
  - Mayor (2020–26): Erika Hütten

Area
  - Total: 3.40 km^{2} (1.31 sq mi)
- Elevation: 363 m (1,191 ft)

Population (2025-12-31)
  - Total: 2,193
  - Density: 645/km^{2} (1,670/sq mi)
- Time zone: UTC+01:00 (CET)
  - Summer (DST): UTC+02:00 (CEST)
- Postal codes: 90617
- Dialling codes: 09101
- Vehicle registration: FÜ
- Website: www.puschendorf.de

Puschendorf (East Franconian: Buschn-doaf) is a municipality in the district of Fürth in Bavaria in Germany.
