= Seukendorf =

- Municipality
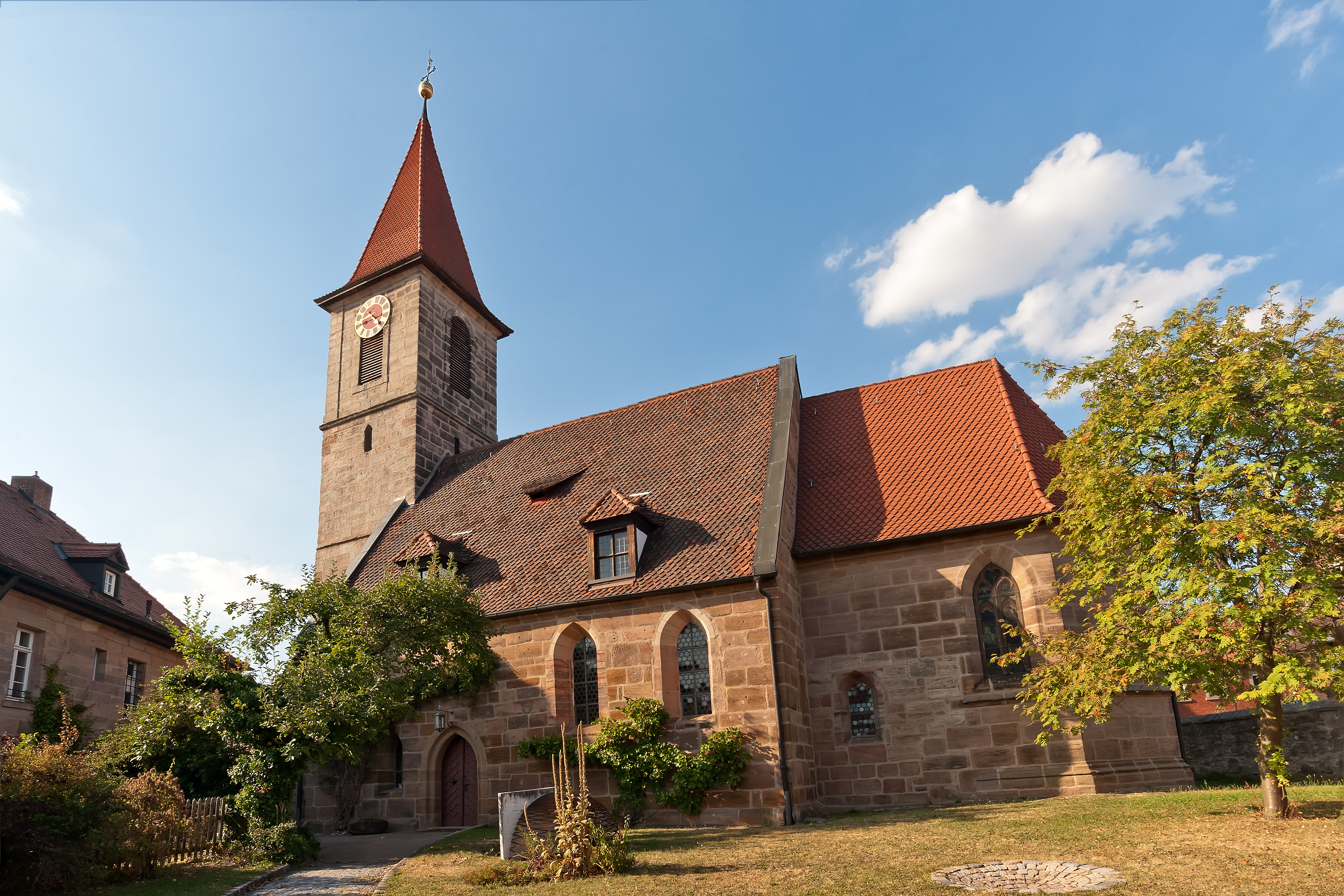
- Church of Saint Catherine

- Coat of arms

- Location of Seukendorf within Fürth district
- Interactive map of Seukendorf
- Location within Germany Location within Bavaria
- Coordinates: 49°28′N 10°52′E
- Country: Germany
- State: Bavaria
- Admin. region: Mittelfranken
- District: Fürth
- Municipal assoc.: Veitsbronn
- Subdivisions: 5 Ortsteile

Government
  - Mayor (2022–28): Sebastian Rocholl (SPD)

Area
  - Total: 8.51 km^{2} (3.29 sq mi)
- Elevation: 328 m (1,076 ft)

Population (2025-12-31)
  - Total: 3,124
  - Density: 367/km^{2} (951/sq mi)
- Time zone: UTC+01:00 (CET)
  - Summer (DST): UTC+02:00 (CEST)
- Postal codes: 90556
- Dialling codes: 0911
- Vehicle registration: FÜ
- Website: www.seukendorf.de

Seukendorf is a municipality in the district of Fürth in Bavaria in Germany.
