= Puchta =

Puchta is a surname. It may refer to:

- George Puchta
- Georg Friedrich Puchta
