= Zenn (river) =

River in Germany

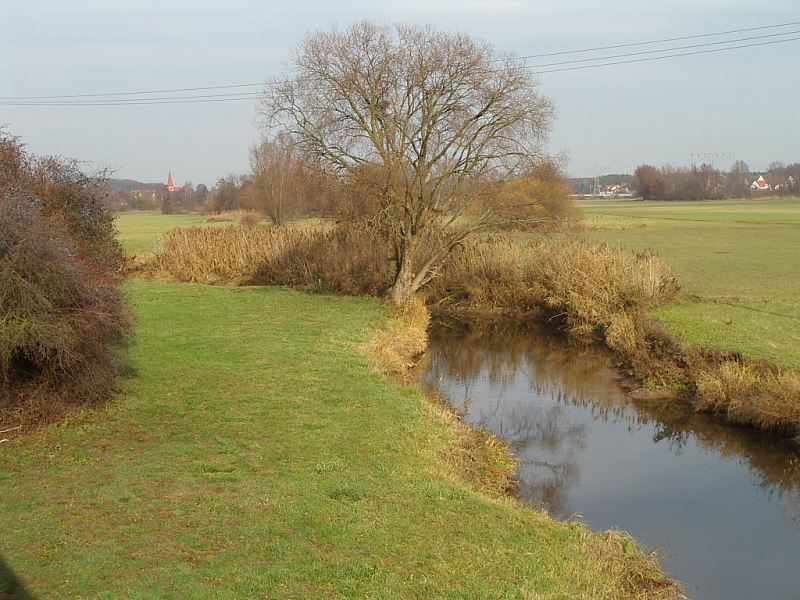
- The Zenn at Atzenhof (a part of Fürth)

- Mouth of the Zenn

Location
- Country: Germany
- State: Bavaria

Physical characteristics
- Mouth
  - location: Regnitz
  - coordinates: 49°31′21″N 10°58′14″E
- Length: 49.1 km (30.5 mi)
- Basin size: 257 km^{2} (99 sq mi)

Basin features
- Progression: Regnitz→ Main→ Rhine→ North Sea

The Zenn is a river of Bavaria, Germany. It is a tributary of the Regnitz, into which it flows near Vach.

== See also ==
- List of rivers of Bavaria
