= Fürth (district) =

Coordinates: 49°25′N 10°50′E

- District
- Flag Coat of arms
- Country: Germany
- State: Bavaria
- Adm. region: Middle Franconia
- Capital: Zirndorf; Fürth gives the name

Government
  - District admin.: Bernd Obst (CSU)

Area
  - Total: 308 km^{2} (119 sq mi)

Population (31 December 2025)
  - Total: 117,787
  - Density: 382/km^{2} (990/sq mi)
- Time zone: UTC+01:00 (CET)
  - Summer (DST): UTC+02:00 (CEST)
- Vehicle registration: FÜ
- Website: landkreis-fuerth.de

Fürth is a Landkreis (district) in Bavaria, Germany. It is bounded by (from the east and clockwise) the cities of Fürth and Nuremberg, and by the districts of Roth, Ansbach, Neustadt (Aisch)-Bad Windsheim and Erlangen-Höchstadt.

== History ==
In the 13th and most of the 14th century the region was a regional centre of the Hohenzollern state. The Cadolzburg (a castle west of Nuremberg) was the seat of the local rulers.

The present district was established in 1972.

In 2003 the administrative seat was moved from Fürth to Zirndorf. (Nonetheless, Fürth remains the official capital of the district.)

== Geography ==
Map of the district Fürth

The district is occupied by the western Nuremberg metropolitan area.

== Politics ==
The district is part of the Fürth constituency for elections to the Bundestag, currently represented by Christian Schmidt.

== Coat of arms ==
The coat of arms displays:

- The eagle which is the heraldic bird of Brandenburg (in medieval times the region was a part of Brandenburg-Ansbach)
- The red and white bars are from the arms of Nuremberg
- The ear and cogwheel are symbols for agriculture and industry

== Towns and municipalities ==
Clickable map of towns and municipalities in the district

Towns
1. Langenzenn
2. Oberasbach
3. Stein
4. Zirndorf
Märkte
1. Ammerndorf
2. Cadolzburg
3. Roßtal
4. Wilhermsdorf
Municipalities
1. Großhabersdorf
2. Puschendorf

Verwaltungsgemeinschaften
| 1. Obermichelbach-Tuchenbach; 1. Obermichelbach^{1}; 2. Tuchenbach | 2. Veitsbronn; 1. Seukendorf; 2. Veitsbronn^{1} |
^{1}seat of the Verwaltungsgemeinschaft
