= Ammerndorf =

- Municipality
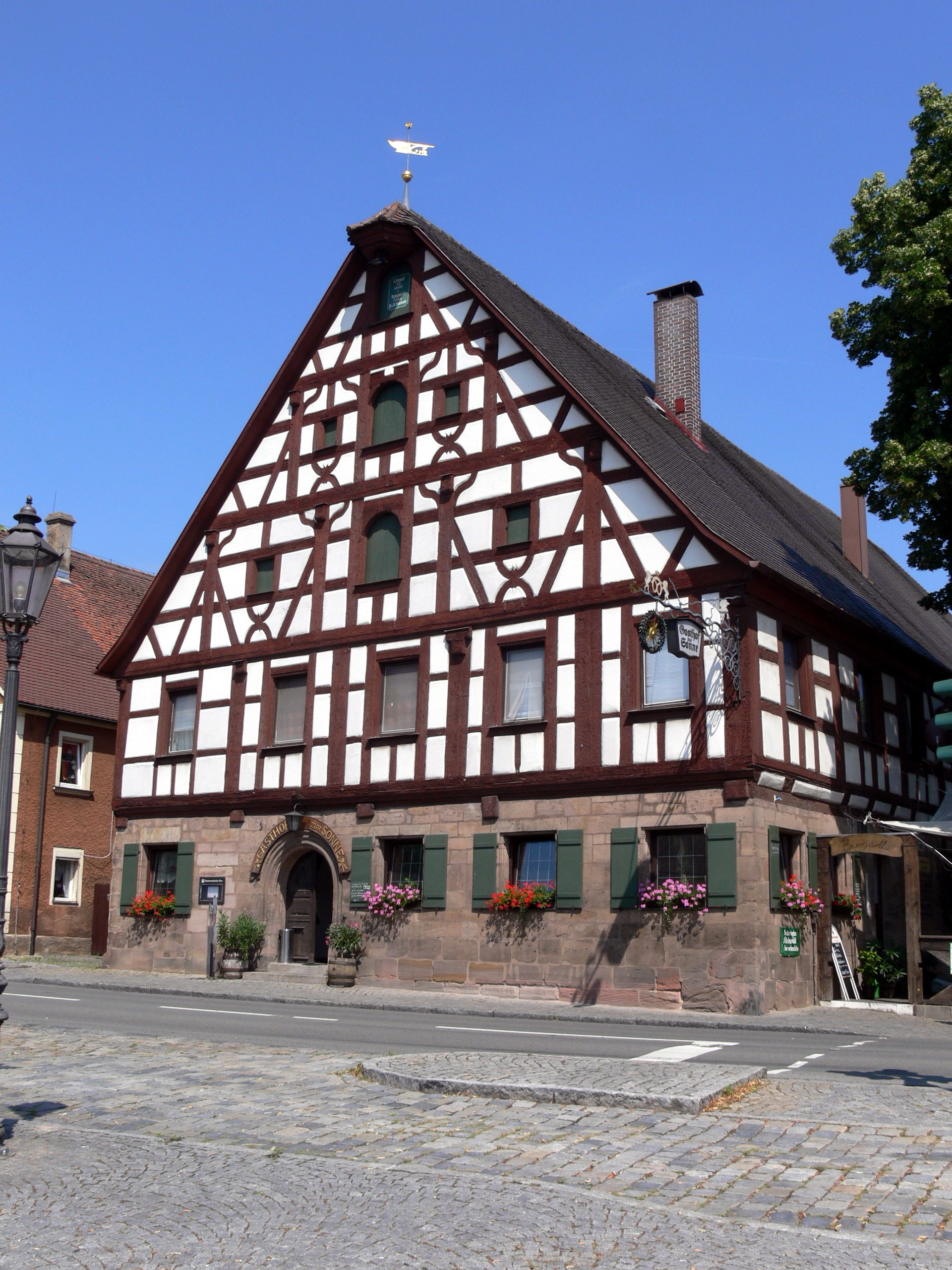
- "The Sun" inn at Ammerndorf

- Coat of arms

- Location of Ammerndorf within Fürth district
- Interactive map of Ammerndorf
- Location within Germany Location within Bavaria
- Coordinates: 49°25′15″N 10°51′05″E
- Country: Germany
- State: Bavaria
- Admin. region: Mittelfranken
- District: Fürth
- Subdivisions: 2 Ortsteile

Government
  - Mayor (2020–26): Alexander Fritz (FW)

Area
  - Total: 5.06 km^{2} (1.95 sq mi)
- Elevation: 316 m (1,037 ft)

Population (2025-12-31)
  - Total: 1,994
  - Density: 394/km^{2} (1,020/sq mi)
- Time zone: UTC+01:00 (CET)
  - Summer (DST): UTC+02:00 (CEST)
- Postal codes: 90614
- Dialling codes: 09127
- Vehicle registration: FÜ
- Website: www.ammerndorf.de

Ammerndorf is a municipality in the district of Fürth in Bavaria in Germany.

It has 2192 inhabitants.
