= Veitsbronn =

- Municipality
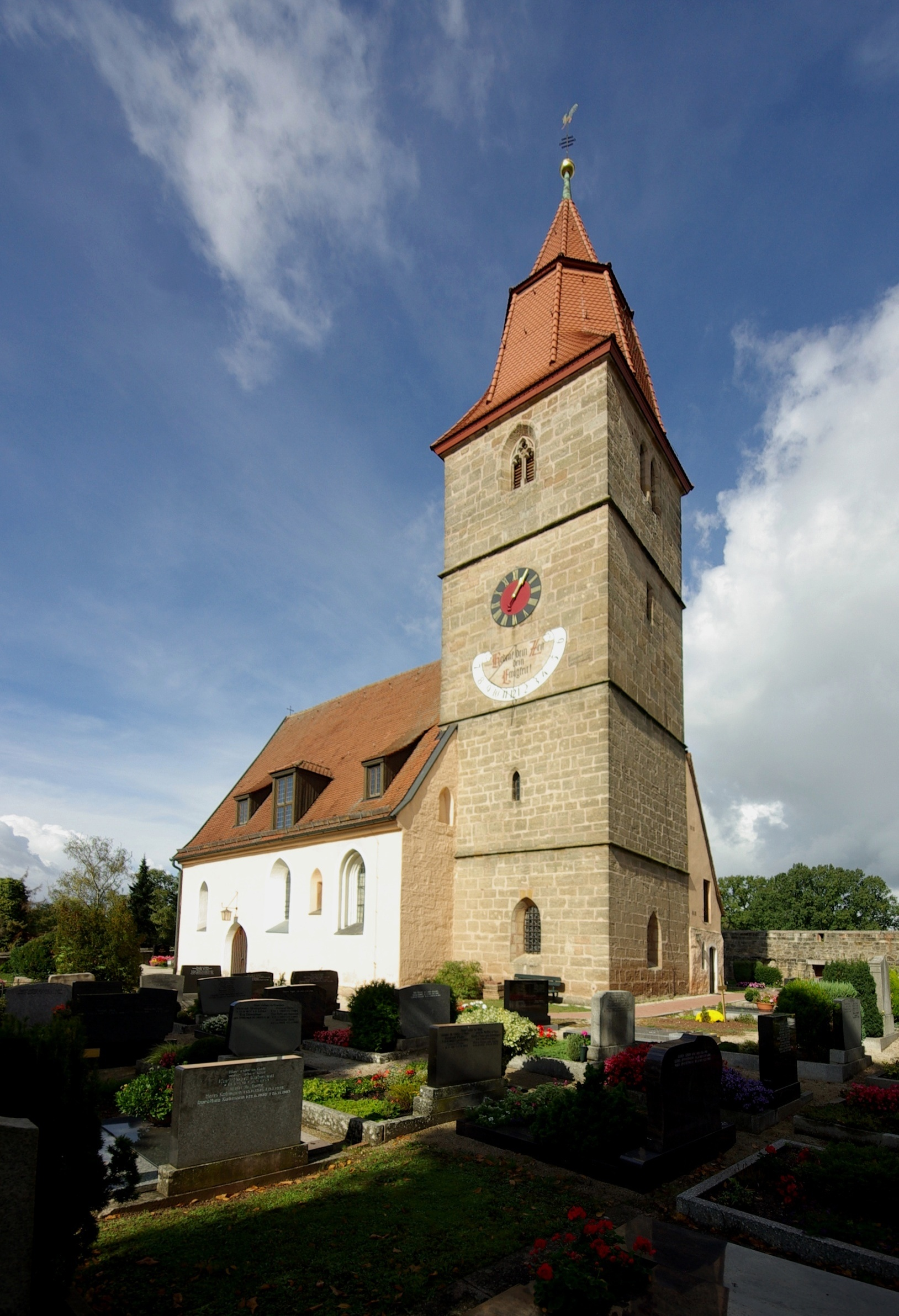
- Church of Saint Vitus

- Coat of arms

- Location of Veitsbronn within Fürth district
- Interactive map of Veitsbronn
- Location within Germany Location within Bavaria
- Coordinates: 49°31′N 10°52′E
- Country: Germany
- State: Bavaria
- Admin. region: Mittelfranken
- District: Fürth
- Municipal assoc.: Veitsbronn
- Subdivisions: 7 Ortsteile

Government
  - Mayor (2020–26): Marco Kistner (CSU)

Area
  - Total: 16.16 km^{2} (6.24 sq mi)
- Elevation: 300 m (980 ft)

Population (2025-12-31)
  - Total: 6,281
  - Density: 388.7/km^{2} (1,007/sq mi)
- Time zone: UTC+01:00 (CET)
  - Summer (DST): UTC+02:00 (CEST)
- Postal codes: 90587
- Dialling codes: 0911
- Vehicle registration: FÜ
- Website: www.veitsbronn.de

Veitsbronn is a municipality in the district of Fürth in Bavaria in Germany.
