= Emskirchen =

- Municipality
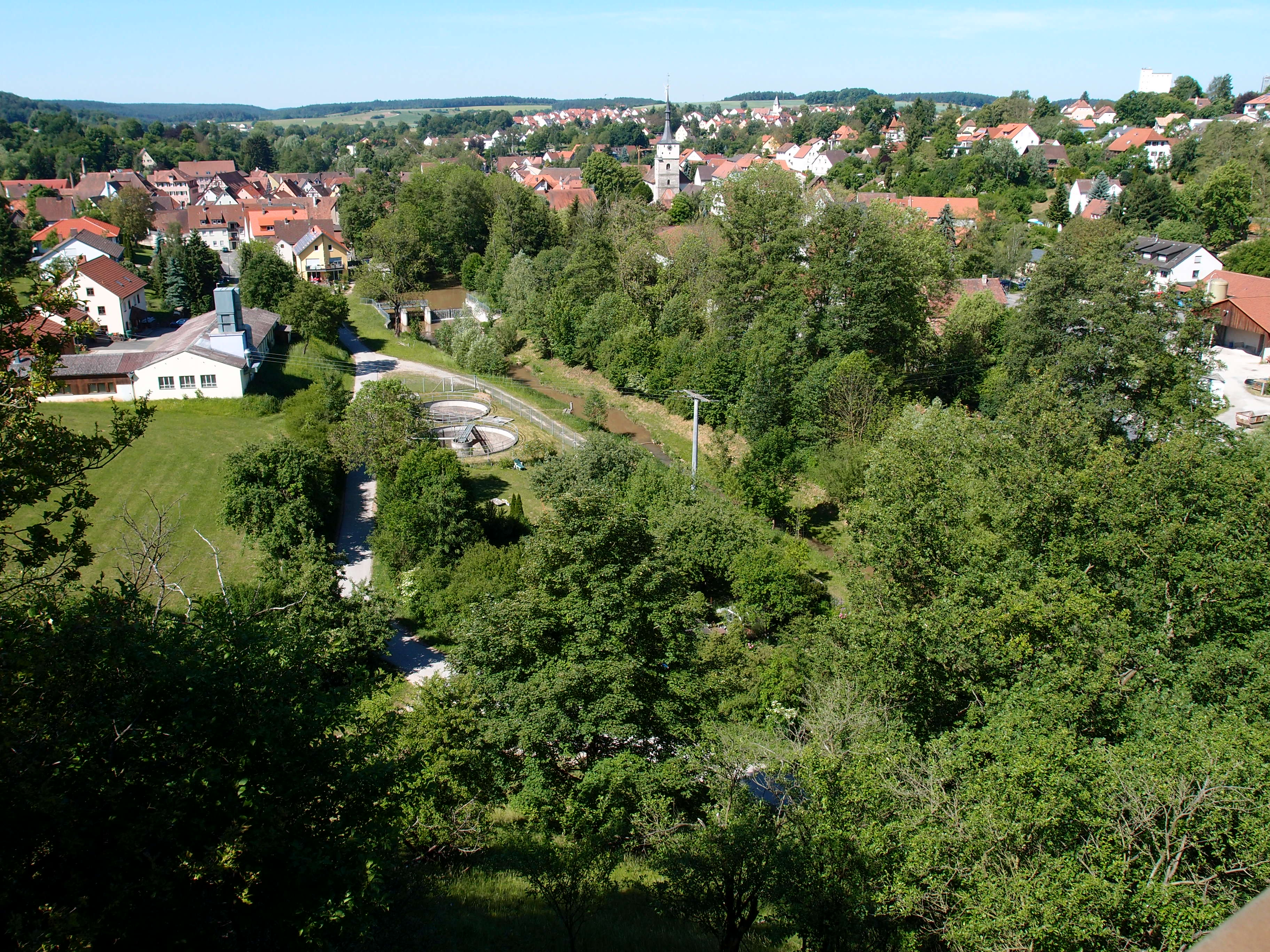
- View from the railway bridge towards Emskirchen

- Flag Coat of arms

- Location of Emskirchen within Neustadt a.d.Aisch-Bad Windsheim district
- Interactive map of Emskirchen
- Location within Germany Location within Bavaria
- Coordinates: 49°33′5″N 10°43′4″E
- Country: Germany
- State: Bavaria
- Admin. region: Mittelfranken
- District: Neustadt a.d.Aisch-Bad Windsheim

Government
  - Mayor (2020–26): Sandra Winkelspecht (CSU)

Area
  - Total: 67.27 km^{2} (25.97 sq mi)
- Elevation: 359 m (1,178 ft)

Population (2025-12-31)
  - Total: 5,837
  - Density: 86.77/km^{2} (224.7/sq mi)
- Time zone: UTC+01:00 (CET)
  - Summer (DST): UTC+02:00 (CEST)
- Postal codes: 91448
- Dialling codes: 09104
- Vehicle registration: NEA
- Website: www.emskirchen.de

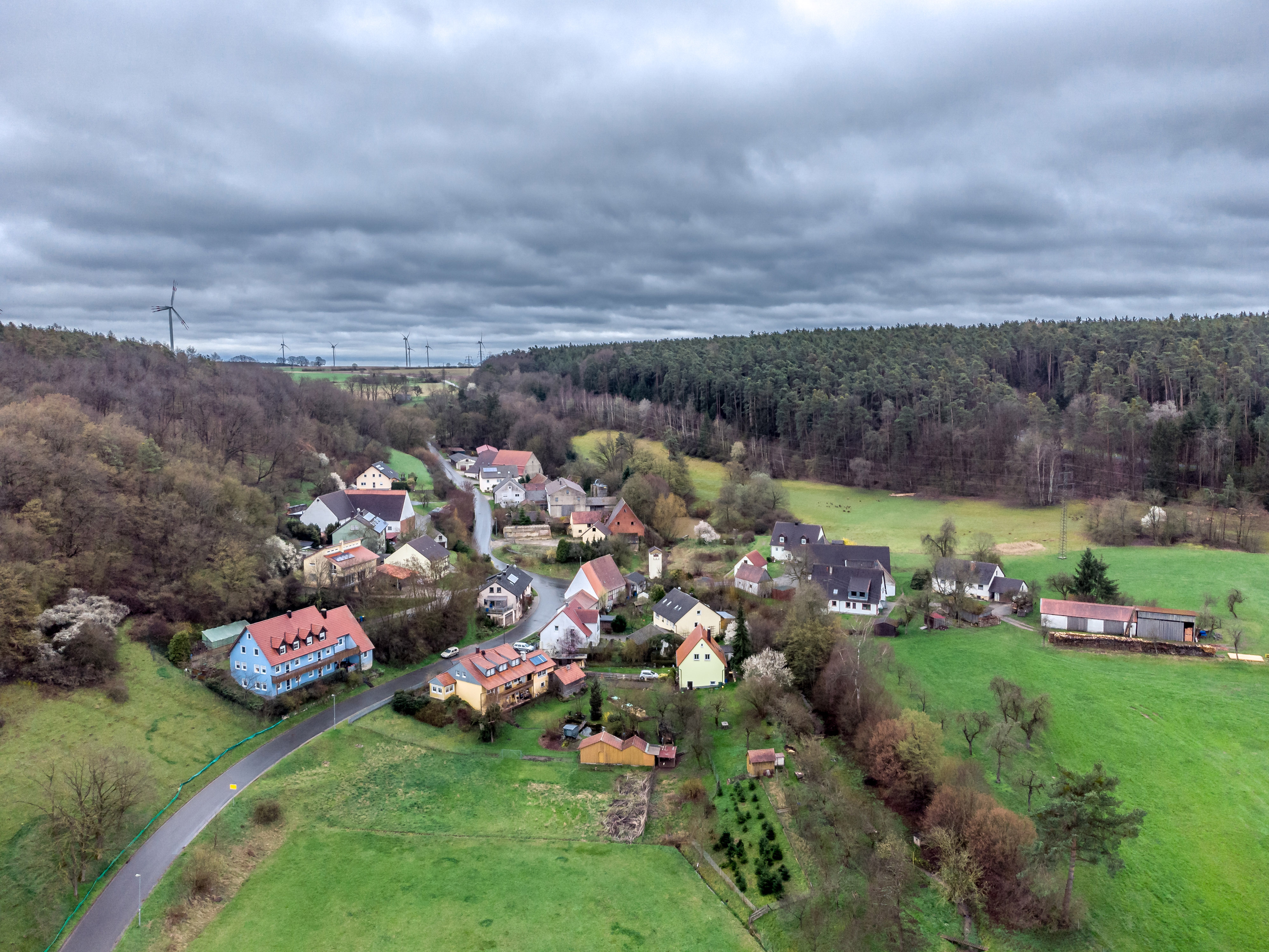
Altschauerberg, a district of Emskirchen

Emskirchen is a municipality in the district of Neustadt (Aisch)-Bad Windsheim in Bavaria in Germany.
