= Großhabersdorf =

- Municipality
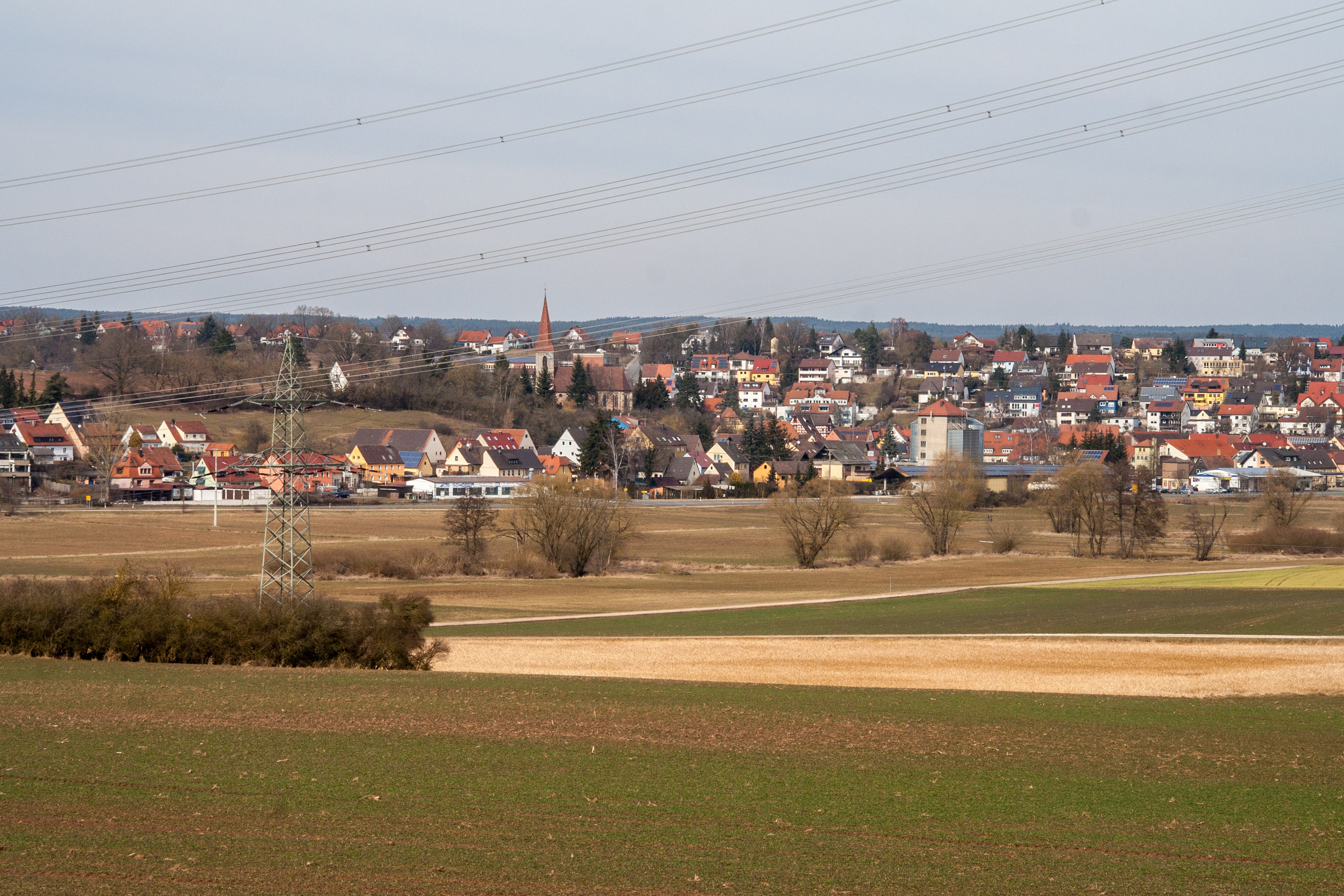
- Großhabersdorf seen from the south

- Coat of arms

- Location of Großhabersdorf within Fürth district
- Interactive map of Großhabersdorf
- Location within Germany Location within Bavaria
- Coordinates: 49°24.25′N 10°47.29′E
- Country: Germany
- State: Bavaria
- Admin. region: Mittelfranken
- District: Fürth
- Subdivisions: 12 Gemeindeteile

Government
  - Mayor (2020–26): Thomas Zehmeister (CSU)

Area
  - Total: 35.50 km^{2} (13.71 sq mi)
- Elevation: 341 m (1,119 ft)

Population (2025-12-31)
  - Total: 4,213
  - Density: 118.7/km^{2} (307.4/sq mi)
- Time zone: UTC+01:00 (CET)
  - Summer (DST): UTC+02:00 (CEST)
- Postal codes: 90611–90613
- Dialling codes: 09105
- Vehicle registration: FÜ
- Website: www.grosshabersdorf.de

Großhabersdorf is a municipality in the district of Fürth, Bavaria, Germany. As of 2020 it had a population of 4,377.

== Town twinning ==
- Święciechowa, Poland
- Aixe-sur-Vienne, France
- Malinska, Croatia
