= List of scheduled railway routes in Germany =

NB: The scheduled routes given here are based primarily on the timetable of the Deutsche Bahn dated 9 December 2007.

== Timetable routes ==
The numbering of German timetabled routes (Kursbuchstrecken or KBS) was changed twice by the Deutsche Bundesbahn after the Second World War, in 1950 and 1970. In the Deutsche Reichsbahn (East Germany) the numbering system was completely changed in 1968. The last major revision took place after German reunification in 1992, as a result of which a common system for DB and DR routes was introduced. In addition changes, usually minor, are made annually.

=== Hamburg and coastal region (100 to 199) ===
(former Bundesbahn division of Hamburg and Reichsbahn divisions Schwerin and Greifswald)

Number (KBS)	Name	Route	KBS -1992	KBS -1970	Remarks
100	Sections of Berlin-Hamburg railway, Hagenow Land–Schwerin railway, Sections of Ludwigslust–Wismar railway, Bad Kleinen–Rostock railway	Hamburg–Schwerin–Rostock	DB170, DR775/770/905/950		Railway company (EVU): DB Regio
101.1	Hamburg S-Bahn: S1	Wedel–Altona–Landungsbrücken–Hamburg–Poppenbüttel	180	108	EVU: Hamburg S-Bahn
101.2	Hamburg S-Bahn: S2	Altona–Landungsbrücken–Hamburg–Bergedorf	182		EVU: Hamburg S-Bahn
101.3	Hamburg S-Bahn: S3	Pinneberg–Altona–Landungsbrücken–Hamburg–Neugraben–Stade	183		EVU: Hamburg S-Bahn
101.11	Hamburg S-Bahn: S11	Blankenese–Altona–Dammtor–Hamburg–Ohlsdorf	181		EVU: Hamburg S-Bahn
101.21	Hamburg S-Bahn: S21	Elbgaustraße–Dammtor–Hamburg–Aumühle	185		EVU: Hamburg S-Bahn
101.31	Hamburg S-Bahn: S31	Altona–Dammtor–Hamburg–Neugraben	187		EVU: Hamburg S-Bahn
102	Berlin-Hamburg railway	(Hamburg)–Aumühle–Büchen		110a	EVU: DB Regio
103	Section of the Marsch Railway, Hamburg-Altona–Kiel railway	Neumünster/Itzehoe–Elmshorn–Hamburg	190	112a	EVU: DB Regio
104	Vogelflug Line	Hamburg–Bad Oldesloe–Lübeck (all traffic)	191	114b	EVU: DB Regio
110	Hanover-Hamburg railway	Hamburg–Lüneburg–Celle–Hanover	150	211	EVU: DB Regio, metronom Eisenbahngesellschaft mbH
112	Wendland Railway	Lüneburg–Dannenberg-Ost	152	109h	EVU: DB Regio
113	Jeetzel Valley Railway Bus	Dannenberg-Ost–Lüchow Süd-Wustrow (Wendland)	152	109h	EIU: Deutsche Regionaleisenbahn
115	Braunschweig–Uelzen railway	Uelzen–Wittingen–Gifhorn–Brunswick	155	209a	EVU: DB Regio
116	Uelzen–Langwedel railway	Bremen–Langwedel–Soltau–Uelzen	165	209	EVU: DB Regio
117		Langenhagen–Hanover (all traffic)	291	211b	EVU: DB Regio
120	Wanne-Eickel–Hamburg railway, Hamburg–Venlo railway	Hamburg–Bremen	100	218	EVU: DB Regio, metronom Eisenbahngesellschaft mbH
121	Lower Elbe Railway	Cuxhaven–Stade–Hamburg	110	217	EVU: Verkehrsgesellschaft Start Unterelbe
122	Bremerhaven–Buxtehude	Buxtehude–Bremervörde–Bremerhaven	111/-/115	217b/c/a	EVU: EVB
123	Heath Railway	Buchholz in der Nordheide–Soltau–Bennemühlen	160	210	EVU: DB Regio
124	Weser-Aller Railway	Rotenburg (Wümme) / Bremen–Verden–Nienburg–Minden	212/213	214f/215e	EVU: DB Regio
125	Bremen–Bremerhaven railway, North Sea Railway	Cuxhaven–Bremerhaven–Bremen	210/214	215/c	EVU: DB Regio, Eisenbahn- and Verkehrsbetriebe Elbe-Weser (Produkt: Nordseebahn)
126	Bremen-Vegesack–Bremen railway	Bremen-Vegesack–Bremen-Burg–Bremen Hbf (all traffic)	211	215a	EVU: DB Regio
127	Farge-Vegesack railway	Bremen-Vegesack–Bremen-Farge (all traffic)		215k	EVU: NordWestBahn
130	Marsh Railway	Westerland–Husum–Heide (Holst)–Itzehoe–Hamburg	120	112	EVU: RE-Verkehr: DB Regio; RB-Verkehr: DB Regio and Nordbahn
131	Hamburg-Altona–Kiel railway Neumünster–Flensburg railway	Hamburg–Neumünster–Kiel or –Flensburg	130/131	113	EVU: DB Regio
132	Neumünster–Heide railway and Heide–Büsum	Neumünster–Heide (Holstein)–Büsum	123/122	112e	EVU: Nordbahn
134	Husum–Jübek, Jübek–Rendsburg and Rendsburg–Kiel lines	Husum–Kiel	120	112k/m	EVU: DB Regio
135	Husum–Bad St. Peter-Ording railway	Husum–Tönning–Bad St. Peter Ording	124	112n	EVU: DB Regio
136	Niebüll–Dagebüll	Niebüll–Dagebüll Mole	126	112p	EVU: Norddeutsche Eisenbahngesellschaft Niebüll
136.1	Niebüll–Tondern	Niebüll–Tondern			EVU: Arriva
137	Hamburg-Altona–Neumünster railway	Neumünster–Kaltenkirchen–Hamburg-Eidelstedt (– Hamburg)	137	113q	EVU: AKN
138	Alster Northern Railway	Ulzburg Süd–Norderstedt Mitte	138	113n	EVU: AKN
139	EBOE	Elmshorn–Barmstedt–Ulzburg Süd	139	112r	EVU: AKN
140	Kiel–Lübeck railway, Lübeck–Lübeck-Travemünde Strand railway, Lübeck–Hamburg railway	Kiel / Travemünde–Lübeck–Hamburg	140/145	114/a/d	EVU: DB Regio
141	Lübeck–Puttgarden railway (Vogelflug Line)	Lübeck–Neustadt in Holstein–Puttgarden	140	114	EVU: DB Regio
142	Neumünster–Bad Oldesloe railway	Neumünster–Bad Segeberg–Bad Oldesloe	142	114c	EVU: Nordbahn
145	Lübeck–Lüneburg railway	Lübeck–Büchen–Lüneburg	145	114d	EVU: DB Regio
146	Kiel–Flensburg railway	Kiel–Eckernförde–Flensburg	145	114d	EVU: DB Regio
152	Schwerin–Rehna; Schwerin–Parchim	Rehna–Schwerin–Parchim	DR778/777		EVU: Ostseeland-Verkehr
172	Kaiser Railway; Berlin-Hamburg railway Parchim-Ludwigslust railway Mecklenburg Southern Railway; Lloyd Railway	Hagenow Land–Ludwigslust–Waren (Müritz)	DR774/773/900		EVU: Ostdeutsche Eisenbahn (Hagenow–Parchim), Hanseatische Eisenbahn (Malchow–Waren)
173		Neustrelitz–Mirow	DR815		EVU: Ostdeutsche Eisenbahn
175	Lübeck-Kleinen railway, Section of Bad Kleinen–Rostock railway Bützow–Szczecin railway Jatznick–Ueckermünde	Lübeck–Bad Kleinen–Bützow–Pasewalk–Szczecin and Ueckermünde	DR775/779/770/930/928		EVU: DB Regio, Ostseeland-Verkehr
181	Rostock S-Bahn: S1; Lloyd Railway	Rostock–Warnemünde	DR901		EVU: DB Regio
182	Rostock S-Bahn: S2; Section of Bad Kleinen–Rostock railway Güstrow–Schwaan railway	(Warnemünde –) Rostock–Schwaan–Güstrow	DR905		EVU: DB Regio
183	Rostock S-Bahn: S3	Rostock–Rostock Seehafen Nord	DR901		EVU: DB Regio
184	Rostock-Stralsund railway Mecklenburgische Bäderbahn	Rostock–Rövershagen–Graal-Müritz	DR950/951		EVU: DB Regio
185	Wismar-Rostock railway Rostock–Tribsees/Tessin railway	Wismar–Rostock–Tessin	DR780/903		EVU: DB Regio
186	Bäderbahn Molli	Bad Doberan–Kühlungsborn West	DR785		
187	Lloyd Railway; Priemerburg–Plaaz railway	Rostock–Laage–Güstrow	DR904		EVU: Ostseelandverkehr GmbH
190	Stralsund–Rostock railway Stralsund–Sassnitz railway/Lietzow–Binz railway	Rostock–Stralsund–Ostseebad Binz/-Sassnitz			EVU: DB Regio Nordost
192	Darß Railway	Barth–Velgast	DR952/950		EVU: Usedomer Bäderbahn
193	Vorpommern Railway	Stralsund–Züssow–Wolgast–Ahlbeck border	DR920/940		EVU: Usedomer Bäderbahn
194	Zinnowitz–Peenemünde railway	Peenemünde–Zinnowitz	DR941		EVU: Usedomer Bäderbahn
195		Ostseebad Binz/Sassnitz–Bergen–Stralsund	DR958/950		EVU: DB Regio
198	Bergen auf Rügen–Lauterbach Mole railway	Bergen–Putbus–Lauterbach Mole	DR955		EVU: Ostseeland-Verkehr
199	Rasender Roland	Lauterbach mole–Putbus–Ostseebad Binz–Göhren–Sellin	DR956		EVU: Preßnitztalbahn

=== Berlin/Brandenburg/Saxony-Anhalt/East Saxony (200 to 299) ===
Number (KBS)	Name	Route	KBS -1992 (DR)	Remarks
200		Berlin Ostbahnhof–Potsdam Hauptbahnhof (without S-Bahn)		
200.1	S1	Wannsee–Oranienburg	151/140	EVU: Berlin S-Bahn
200.2	S2	Blankenfelde–Bernau	118/152/141	EVU: Berlin S-Bahn
200.25	S25	Teltow Stadt–Hennigsdorf		EVU: Berlin S-Bahn
200.3	S3	Erkner–Berlin Ostbahnhof	105	EVU: Berlin S-Bahn
200.41	S41	Gesundbrunnen–Ostkreuz–Südkreuz–Westkreuz– Gesundbrunnen (Ring railway counter-clockwise)		EVU: Berlin S-Bahn
200.42	S42	Gesundbrunnen–Westkreuz–Südkreuz–Ostkreuz– Gesundbrunnen (Ring railway counter-clockwise)		EVU: Berlin S-Bahn
200.45	S45	Berlin-Schönefeld Airport–Hermannstrasse		EVU: Berlin S-Bahn
200.46	S46	Königs Wusterhausen–Westend	110	EVU: Berlin S-Bahn
200.47	S47	Spindlersfeld–Südkreuz	143	EVU: Berlin S-Bahn
200.5	S5	Strausberg Nord–Westkreuz	100	EVU: Berlin S-Bahn
200.7	S7	Ahrensfelde–Potsdam Hauptbahnhof	102/110	EVU: Berlin S-Bahn
200.75	S75	Wartenberg–Spandau	101	EVU: Berlin S-Bahn
200.8	S8	(Zeuthen–) Grünau–Hohen Neuendorf	140	EVU: Berlin S-Bahn
200.85	S85	(Grünau–) Schöneweide–Waidmannslust		EVU: Berlin S-Bahn
200.9	S9	Berlin-Schönefeld Airport–Spandau	115	EVU: Berlin S-Bahn
201	Magdeburg–Potsdam: Berlin-Potsdam-Magdeburg railway Berlin–Frankfurt (Oder): Lower Silesian-Mark railway	Magdeburg–Brandenburg–Berlin–Frankfurt (Oder)–Cottbus	700/180/220	EVU: DB Regio
202	Rathenow–Berlin: Lehrte Railway; Berlin–Cottbus: Görlitz Railway	Rathenow–Berlin–Cottbus	750/200	EVU: DB Regio
203	Angermünde–Berlin: Stettin Railway; Berlin–Elsterwerda: Dresden Railway	Stralsund/Schwedt/Oder–Angermünde–Berlin–Senftenberg/Elsterwerda	920/921/300	EVU: DB Regio
204	Wismar–Ludwigslust: Ludwigslust–Wismar railway Ludwigslust–Berlin: Hamburg Railway; Berlin–Jüterbog: Anhalt Railway	Wismar–Schwerin–Wittenberge–Berlin–Jüterbog	800/500	EVU: DB Regio
205	Rostock–Neustrelitz: Lloyd Railway; Stralsund–Berlin: Prussian Northern Railway; Berlin–Lutherstadt Wittenberg: Anhalt Railway; Jüterbog-Falkenberg/Elster: Jüterbog–Riesa railway	Rostock/Stralsund–Neustrelitz–Berlin–Lutherstadt Wittenberg/Falkenberg (Elster)	900/910/500/214	EVU: DB Regio
206	Prignitz-Express; Kremmen–Berlin: Kremmen Railway	Wittenberge–Neuruppin–Hennigsdorf–Spandau	810/815/191	EVU: DB Regio
207	Wiesenburg/Mark–Berlin: Berlin-Blankenheim railway Berlin– Blankenfelde: Berlin Outer Ring Blankenfelde–Wünsdorf: Dresden Railway	Dessau–Berlin–Wünsdorf-Waldstadt	680/117	EVU: DB Regio
208	Priestewitz–Cottbus railway (section), Großenhain–Priestewitz railway, Leipzig–Dresden railway (section)	Cottbus–Ruhland–Dresden and Falkenberg	220/230	EVU: DB Regio
209.10	Berlin-Hamburg railway	Nauen–Berlin (all traffic)		EVU: DB Regio
209.12		Templin–Zehdenick–Berlin-Lichtenberg	912/910	EVU: Prignitzer Eisenbahn, DB Regio
209.14		Nauen–Berlin–Berlin-Schönefeld Airport–Lübbenau–Senftenberg	200/221	EVU: DB Regio
209.20	Berlin Outer Ring	Oranienburg–Hennigsdorf–Potsdam	125	EVU: DB Regio
209.21	Berlin Outer Ring, Brandenburg Ring Railway	Berlin–Griebnitzsee–Potsdam–Golm–Wustermark	124/125	EVU: DB Regio
209.25	Wriezen Railway	Berlin-Lichtenberg–Werneuchen	171	EVU: Ostdeutsche Eisenbahn
209.26	Prussian Eastern Railway	Berlin-Lichtenberg–Seelow-Gusow–Küstrin-Kietz–Kostrzyn (PL)	173	EVU: Niederbarnimer Eisenbahn
209.27	Heidekraut Railway	Gross Schönebeck–Klosterfelde–Basdorf–Berlin-Karow; Wensickendorf–Basdorf–Berlin-Karow	193/194	EVU: NEB Betriebsgesellschaft; EIU: Niederbarnimer Eisenbahn
209.32	Berlin–Halle railway	Berlin-Lichterfelde Ost–Teltow–Ludwigsfelde	121	
209.33	Berlin–Michendorf: Berlin-Blankenheim railway Michendorf–Jüterbog Brandenburg Ring Railway	Berlin–Beelitz–Michendorf–Jüterbog	185	EVU: Ostseelandverkehr GmbH (Marke: Märkische Regiobahn)
209.35	Scharmützelsee Railway	Bad Saarow-Pieskow–Fürstenwalde (Spree)	181	EVU: Ostdeutsche Eisenbahn
209.36	Frankfurt (Oder)–Grunow: Cottbus–Frankfurt (Oder) railway Grunow–Königs Wusterhausen: Königs Wusterhausen–Grunow railway Königs Wusterhausen–Berlin-Schöneweide: Berlin–Görlitz railway	Frankfurt (Oder)–Beeskow–Königs Wusterhausen–Berlin-Schöneweide	182	EVU: Ostdeutsche Eisenbahn
209.46	Cottbus–Żary railway	Cottbus–Forst (Lausitz)	206	EVU: DB Regio
209.51	Brandenburg Stadtbahn	Rathenow–Brandenburg	704	EVU: Ostseelandverkehr (Marke: Märkische Regiobahn)
209.54	Löwenberg–Lindow–Rheinsberg railway	(Berlin -) Löwenberg (Mark)–Herzberg (Mark)–Rheinsberg	913/914	EVU: DB Regio
209.55	Kremmen Railway	Kremmen–Hennigsdorf	191	EVU: DB Regio
209.60	Eberswalde–Frankfurt (Oder) railway	Berlin-Lichtenberg–Eberswalde–Frankfurt (Oder) and Eberswalde–Joachimsthal	920/176/916	EVU: Ostdeutsche Eisenbahn
209.66	Berlin-Stettin railway	Szczecin (PL)–Angermünde–(Berlin)	923/920	EVU: DB Regio
209.73	Meyenburg–Neustadt (Dosse) railway	Neustadt (Dosse)–Kyritz–Pritzwalk	814	EVU: Hanseatische Eisenbahn
209.74	Meyenburg–Neustadt (Dosse) railway	Meyenburg (Prignitz)–Pritzwalk	810	EVU: Hanseatische Eisenbahn
211	Frankfurt–Guben: Niederschlesisch-Märkische Eisenbahn; Guben–Cottbus: Halle–Sorau–Guben railway	Frankfurt (Oder)–Eisenhüttenstadt–Cottbus	220	EVU: DB Regio
213	Lower Lusatia Railway	Beeskow–Lübben–Falkenberg–Mühlberg/Riesa	205/212	EVU & EIU: Deutsche Regionaleisenbahn
215	Leipzig-Eilenburg: Leipzig–Eilenburg railway Halle-Falkenberg/Elster: Halle–Falkenberg/Elster railway	Leipzig–Eilenburg-Falkenberg–Cottbus	210	EVU: DB Regio
216	Dessau–Falkenberg/Elster railway	Dessau–Falkenberg	230	EVU: DB Regio
217	Fläming Railway Bus	Belzig–Niemegk		EIU: Deutsche Regionaleisenbahn
218	Elbe-Heide railway incl. bus section	Lutherstadt Wittenberg–Pretzsch (Elbe)-Eilenburg/Torgau	213/215	EVU & EIU: Deutsche Regionaleisenbahn
219	Halle–Falkenberg/Elster railway	Halle–Eilenburg	216	EVU: DB Regio
220	Neisse Valley Railway / Berlin–Görlitz railway	Zittau–Görlitz–Weisswasser–Cottbus	241/200	EVU: Lausitz Railway
223	Horka–Priebus railway Bus	Horka–Rothenburg-Lodenau		EIU: Deutsche Regionaleisenbahn
225		Hoyerswerda and Elsterwerda-Biehla–Grossenhain–Cossebaude–Dresden	220/230	EVU: DB Regio
226		Königsbrück and Dresden-Klotzsche–Dresden	303	EVU: DB Regio
227		Kamenz and Dresden-Klotzsche–Dresden	221	EVU: DB Regio
229		Hoyerswerda–Görlitz	230	EVU: DB Regio
230	Saxon-Silesian Railway	Dresden–Bischofswerda–Bautzen–Görlitz	240	EVU: DB Regio
231	Lusatian Highland Railway; Umgebindeland railway Bus	Löbau (Sachs)–Niedercunnersdorf-Ebersbach (Saxony) / Oberoderwitz		EIU: Deutsche Regionaleisenbahn
232	Mandau Railway bus, continuation by KBS 236	Eibau–Seifhennersdorf	250	EIU: Deutsche Regionaleisenbahn
233		Dresden–Dresden-Klotzsche–Bischofswerda (all traffic)	304	EVU: DB Regio
235	Bischofswerda–Zittau railway	Dresden–Bischofswerda–Ebersbach (Saxony)–Zittau (– Liberec(CZ))	250	EVU: DB Regio
236	Mandau Railway, for continuation see KBS 232	Seifhennersdorf–Grossschönau–Zittau	250	EVU: DB Regio
238	Zittau Narrow Gauge Railway	Zittau–Bertsdorf– Oybin Spa and Jonsdorf Spa	251	EVU: DB Regio
239	Lausitz-Semmering Railway Bus	Neukirch/Lausitz West–Neustadt (Sachsen)		EIU: Deutsche Regionaleisenbahn
240	Berlin-Dresden railway	Berlin–Elsterwerda–Dresden	300	
241		Dresden–Dresden-Neustadt (all traffic)	301	
241.1	Dresden S-Bahn: S1	Meissen Trebischtal–Coswig–Dresden–Pirna–Schöna	306/310	EVU: DB Regio
241.2	Dresden S-Bahn: S2	Pirna–Heidenau–Dresden–Dresden Airport	304/306	EVU: DB Regio
245		Coswig–Radebeul–Dresden	306	EVU: DB Regio
246	Müglitz Valley Railway	Spa Altenberg–Heidenau	311	EVU: DB Regio
246.1		Spa Altenberg–Heidenau–Dresden (Winter sports traffic)		EVU: DB Regio
248	Sebnitz Valley Railway	Pirna–Neustadt–Sebnitz–Bad Schandau	314	EVU: DB Regio
250	Berlin-Jüterbog: Anhalt Railway, Dessau–Leipzig	Berlin–Jüterbog and Dessau–Bitterfeld–Leipzig and Halle	500	EVU: DB Regio
251	Dessau–Leipzig	Dessau–Bitterfeld–Leipzig and Halle	720/500	EVU: DB Regio
254	Magdeburg–Dessau railway	Magdeburg–Dessau	710	EVU: DB Regio
256	Biederitz–Dessau railway	Rosslau–Dessau (all traffic)	233	
257	Dessau–Wörlitz railway	Dessau–Wörlitz	721	
259	Biederitz–Altengrabow railway	Magdeburg–Loburg	709	EVU: Elbe-Saale-Bahn
260	Berlin–Potsdam–Magdeburg railway	Magdeburg–Brandenburg–Berlin	700	
261		Magdeburg–Biederitz (all traffic)	701	
269	Stendal–Tangermünde railway	Stendal–Tangermünde	752	EVU: Elbe-Saale-Bahn

=== Lower Saxony/Saxony-Anhalt region (300 to 399) ===
(ehem. Bundesbahndirektion Hanover)

Number (KBS)	Name	Route	KBS -1992	KBS -1970	Remarks
300	Berlin-Lehrte railway	Hanover–Lehrte–Gifhorn–Wolfsburg	220	208	operator: DB Regio
301	Berlin-Lehrte railway Hanover–Berlin high-speed railway	Brunswick–Wolfsburg–Oebisfelde–Stendal	220	207a	operator: Elbe-Saale-Bahn
303	Altmark Railway Bus; Salzwedel-Oebisfelde railway Bus	Wittenberge–Salzwedel-Klötze	756, 764		EIU: Deutsche Regionaleisenbahn
305	Uelzen–Stendal: Stendal–Uelzen railway Wittenberge–Stendal–Magdeburg: Magdeburg-Wittenberge railway	Wittenberge/Uelzen–Stendal–Magdeburg	757, 770	(209)	209 only Uelzen–Nienbergen; operator: DB Regio
308	Oebisfelde–Magdeburg railway	Oebisfelde–Haldensleben–Magdeburg	763		operator: Elbe-Saale-Bahn
309	Magdeburg S-Bahn: S 1	Zielitz–Magdeburg–Schönebeck-Salzelmen	702		operator: DB Regio
310	Hanover–Brunswick railway, Brunswick–Magdeburg railway	Hanover–Lehrte–Peine–Brunswick–Helmstedt–Magdeburg	230	207	operator: DB Regio
310.1	Bus	Magdeburg–Eilsleben			operator: DB Regio
312	Wolfenbüttel–Helmstedt railway	Brunswick–Wolfenbüttel–Jerxheim–Helmstedt	236	206c	
313	Hildesheim–Brunswick railway	Hildesheim–Brunswick		213	
315	Magdeburg–Thale railway	Magdeburg–Halberstadt–Thale	700		
315.1	Bus	Quedlinburg–Aschersleben			
316	Zuckerbahn, Blumenberg–Eilsleben railway	Blumenberg–Wanzleben			EIU: Deutsche Regionaleisenbahn
320	Hanoverian Southern Railway, Hildesheim–Goslar railway	Hanover–Barnten–Hildesheim–Goslar–Bad Harzburg	240	204	
320.1	Bus	Braunlage–Bad Harzburg			
321		Elze–Nordstemmen–Hildesheim (all traffic)	251	213a	
322	Lamme Valley Railway	Hildesheim–Bodenburg	253	202c	operator: Eurobahn
323	Lehrte–Nordstemmen railway	Hanover–Lehrte–Hildesheim	241	200a	
325	Brocken Railway (narrow gauge)	Wernigerode–Drei Annen Hohne–Schierke–Brocken	678		operator: HSB
326	Harzquer Railway (narrow gauge)	Drei-Annen-Hohne–Eisfelder Talmühle–Ilfeld–Nordhausen	678		operator: HSB
328	Blankenburg–Halberstadt (Harz)	Halberstadt–Blankenburg	717		operator: HEX
330	Vienenburg-Halberstadt: Halberstadt–Vienenburg railway	Goslar–Halberstadt–Aschersleben/Bernburg (Saale)–Könnern–Halle	670		
330.1	Bus	Halberstadt–Dardesheim/Zilly–Osterwieck			
333	Selke Valley Railway (narrow gauge)	Quedlinburg–Gernrode–Alexisbad–Harzgerode/Stiege–Hasselfelde/Eisfelder Talmühle	674		operator: HSB
334	Köthen–Aschersleben railway, Dessau–Köthen railway	Aschersleben–Köthen–Dessau	690		operator: Elbe-Saale-Bahn
335	Schönebeck–Güsten railway, Berlin-Blankenheim railway, Sangerhausen–Erfurt railway	Magdeburg–Güsten–Sangerhausen–Sömmerda–Erfurt			operator: Elbe-Saale-Bahn
337	Klostermansfeld–Wippra railway	Helbra–Klostermansfeld–Wippra	655		
340	Magdeburg-Leipzig railway	Magdeburg–Calbe Ost–Halle–Leipzig/Bernburg (Saale)	730		
342	Köthen–Aken railway	Köthen–Aken	691		
349	Hanover–Berlin high-speed railway	Berlin–Wolfsburg–Hanover/Hildesheim–Göttingen–Frankfurt (Main) (all traffic)			
350	Hanoverian Southern Railway	Hanover–Elze–Alfeld–Kreiensen–Northeim (Han)–Göttingen	250	202	operator: DB Regio, metronom Eisenbahngesellschaft mbH
351	partly parallel with KBS 350, from Hanover SFS	Hamburg–Hanover–Kassel–Fulda–Würzburg/Frankfurt (Main)	295	204	
352		Salzgitter-Lebenstedt–Brunswick	296	206d	
353	Brunswick–Bad Harzburg railway, Vienenburg–Goslar railway	Brunswick–Vienenburg–Bad Harzburg–Goslar	235	206	
354		Bad Harzburg–Goslar–Seesen–Kreiensen	231	206b	
355	Altenbeken–Kreiensen railway (section), Brunswick–Kreiensen railway	Holzminden–Kreiensen–Seesen–Brunswick	255	206a	
356 Nord	Solling Railway	Ottbergen–Bodenfelde–Northeim; NRW tariff: PauschalPreisTickets Wehrden–Bad Karlshafen	245	200	
356 Süd	Oberweser Railway	Bodenfelde–Göttingen	245	202d	
357	South Harz Railway	Göttingen–Northeim (Han)–Herzberg (Harz)–Nordhausen	245	200	
357.1	Bus	Herzberg(Harz)–Bad Lauterberg–Sankt Andreasberg			
357.2	Bus	Walkenried–Braunlage			
358	Herzberg–Seesen railway	Brunswick–Seesen–Herzberg(Harz)		200a/206f	
361		Hanover Hbf–Hanover Bismarckstr. (all traffic)			
363.1	Hanover S-Bahn	Minden–Haste–Hanover–Weetzen–Haste			
363.2	Hanover S-Bahn	Nienburg–Hanover–Weetzen–Bad Nenndorf–Haste			
363.3	Hanover S-Bahn	Celle–Lehrte–Hanover (all traffic)			
363.4.5	Hanover S-Bahn	Bennemühlen/Hanover Airport–Hanover–Weetzen–Hamelin–Altenbeken–Paderborn; NRW tariff: RelationsPreisTickets (Vlotho–) Hamelin–Lügde			
370	Hamm–Minden railway, Hanover-Minden railway	Bielefeld–Herford–Minden–Hanover	200	214	
371		Haste–Wunstorf–Hanover (all traffic)	290	214a	
372	Weser Railway	Bünde-Löhne–Vlotho-Rinteln-Hamelin–Elze–Hildesheim; NRW tariff: RelationsPreisTickets Vlotho–Hameln (–Lügde)	265	213	operator: NordWestBahn
375	Almelo–Salzbergen railway, Löhne–Rheine railway	Bad Bentheim–Rheine–Osnabrück–Bünde–Löhne–Minden; NRW tariff: RelationsPreisTickets and PauschalPreisTickets Ibbenbüren-Laggenbeck–Bünde (Westf)	270	222	operator: DB Regio Niedersachsen, WestfalenBahn, Eurobahn
380	Bremen-Hanover railway	Bremen–Hanover			
385	Wanne-Eickel–Hamburg railway, Hamburg-Venlo railway	Bremen–Osnabrück–Münster; NRW tariff: RelationsPreisTickets and PauschalPreisTickets Osnabrück Hbf–Lengerich (Westf)			
386	Ravensberg railway	Bielefeld–Herford–Bünde–Rahden	105	219	operator: Eurobahn, WestfalenBahn (only the Bünde – Bielefeld section)
390	Bremen–Oldenburg railway and Oldenburg–Leer railway	Norddeich mole–Emden–Leer–Oldenburg–Bremen	215/17	221/23	operator: DB Regio Niedersachsen and NordWestBahn
391	Hude–Nordenham railway	Nordenham–Hude–Bremen		221r	
392	Wilhelmshaven–Oldenburg railway and Oldenburg–Osnabrück railway	Wilhelmshaven–Oldenburg–Cloppenburg–Osnabrück; NRW tariff: RelationsPreisTickets and PauschalPreisTickets Halen–Osnabrück Hbf	215/75	220/21	operator: NordWestBahn
393	Ostfriesische Küsten Railway	Wilhelmshaven–Sande–Jever–Esens	218	221g	operator: NordWestBahn
394	Delmenhorst–Osnabrück railway, also called the Hasen Railway	Bremen–Delmenhorst–Vechta–Bramsche–Osnabrück; NRW tariff: RelationsPreisTickets and PauschalPreisTickets Halen–Osnabrück Hbf	276	220a	operator: NordWestBahn
395	Emsland Railway	Norddeich mole–Emden–Leer– Papenburg-Meppen-Lingen-Rheine-Münster	280	223	
396		Emden–Emden Outer Harbour		223b	
397	Leer–Groningen railway	Leer–Weener–Nieuweschans–Groningen		221a	operator: NoordNed

=== North Rhine-Westphalia Region (400 to 499) ===
(former Bundesbahn divisions Essen and Cologne, see also: List of SPNV lines in NRW)

Number (KBS)	Name	Route	KBS -1992	KBS -1970	Remarks
400	Hamm–Minden railway	Hamm–Gütersloh–Bielefeld	200	214	Former Cologne-Mindener Eisenbahn-Gesellschaft (CME); EVu: DB Regio NRW und NordWestBahn GmbH
402	Haller Willem	Bielefeld–Halle Westf-Osnabrück; NRW tariff: RelationsPreisTickets and PauschalPreisTickets Westbarthausen–Osnabrück Hbf	202	222a	EVU: NordWestBahn
403	Senne Railway and Egge Railway	Bielefeld–Paderborn–Ottbergen–Holzminden; NRW tariff: PauschalPreisTickets Lüchtringen–Holzminden	203	222b	EVU: NordWestBahn GmbH
404	Bega Valley Railway	Bielefeld–Oerlinghausen–Lage–Lemgo	204	214d	EVU: Eurobahn, NordWestBahn GmbH
405	Ostwestfalen Railway	Herford–Lage–Detmold–Paderborn	205	214b	EVU: WestfalenBahn, NordWestBahn
406	Warendorf Railway amongst others	Münster (Westf)–Bielefeld–Lage–Altenbeken	207	222c	EVU: NordWestBahn GmbH
407	Münster–Enschede railway	Münster (Westf)–Gronau–Enschede (NL); NRW tariff: PauschalPreisTickets Gronau–Enschede	285	224e	EVU: DB Regio NRW
408	Baumberge Railway	Münster Zentrum Nord–Münster (Westf)–Coesfeld			EVU: DB Regio NRW
410	Münster–Rheine railway, Münster–Hamm railway	Rheine–Münster (Westf)–Hamm	280	223	EVU: DB Regio NRW and WestfalenBahn
411	Preußen–Münster railway, Dortmund–Gronau railway	Münster (Westf)–Lünen–Dortmund	288	224	EVU: DB Regio NRW
412	Westmünsterland Railway	Enschede–Gronau–Dortmund; NRW tariff: PauschalPreisTickets Enschede–Gronau	289	224a	EVU: DB Regio NRW
415	a) Cologne–Duisburg, b) Duisburg–Dortmund, Dortmund–Hamm	Cologne–Düsseldorf–Duisburg–Essen– Bochum–Dortmund–Hamm	300	227	a+c) CME, b) Bergisch-Märkische Eisenbahn-Gesellschaft, EVu: DB Regio NRW
416	Cologne–Duisburg, Duisburg–Dortmund, Dortmund–Hamm	Düsseldorf–Duisburg–Oberhausen– Gelsenkirchen–Dortmund–Hamm	300	227	Former CME; EVU: DB Regio NRW
420	Oberhausen–Arnhem, Duisburg–Oberhausen, Cologne–Duisburg	(Amsterdam Centraal–Utrecht Centraal–)Arnhem– Emmerich–Wesel–Oberhausen–Duisburg (–Cologne)	310	235	Former CME; EVU: DB Regio NRW
421	Bocholt Railway	Wesel–Bocholt	311	235 a	Former CME; EVU: DB Regio NRW
423	Gladbeck-Zweckel–Borken / Dorsten-Coesfeld, Essen–Essen-Dellwig Ost, Oberhausen-Osterfeld/Essen-Dellwig Ost/Gladbeck West–Gladbeck-Zweckel	Borken (Westf) / Coesfeld (Westf)–Dorsten–Gladbeck-Bottrop–Essen	315	234a	Formerly Niederländisch-Westfälische Eisenbahn, Rheinbahn-Gesellschaft; EVU: NordWestBahn
424	Bottrop–Oberhausen-Osterfeld Süd-Duisburg-Moers	Bottrop–Oberhausen-Duisburg-Moers	315	224c	Rhenish Railway Company; EVU: NordWestBahn
425	Mönchengladbach–Duisburg, Duisburg–Dortmund or Duisburg–Witten/Dortmund, Rollbahn	Mönchengladbach–Duisburg–Oberhausen / Essen – Gelsenkirchen–Münster (Westf)	465,300,320	234/244	Former BME and CME; EVu: DB Regio NRW
426	Emscher Valley Railway partly	Dorsten–Wanne-Eickel–Dortmund	325	234a/236a	Former Niederländisch-Westfälische Eisenbahn and CME; EVU: DB Regio NRW
427	Letmathe–Iserlohn railway amongst others	Essen / Dortmund–Witten–Hagen–Iserlohn	352	233/239/f	Former Bergisch-Märkische Eisenbahn; EVU: DB Regio NRW
428	Nokia Railway	Gelsenkirchen–Wanne-Eickel–Bochum	388		Former Bergisch-Märkische Eisenbahn; EVU: Abellio Rail NRW
430	Hamm–Warburg railway, Kassel–Warburg railway	Hamm–Paderborn–Altenbeken–Warburg–Kassel; NRW tariff: RelationsPreisTickets Warburg– (Kassel–Giessen–) Rudersdorf (Siegen)	340	232/238	Former Königlich-Westfälische Eisenbahn; EVU: DB Regio NRW
431	Hellweg Railway	Dortmund–Unna-Soest	342	227e	EVU: DB Regio NRW
433	Ardey Railway	Dortmund–Schwerte–Iserlohn	351	239g	EVU: DB Regio NRW
434	Hagen–Dieringhausen railway, Brügge–Lüdenscheid railway	Dortmund–Hagen–Lüdenscheid	405	240/c	EVU: DB Regio NRW
435	Upper Ruhr Valley Railway	Hagen–Bestwig–Warburg	350	238	EVU: DB Regio NRW
437	Hönne Valley Railway, Menden–Fröndenberg	Unna–Fröndenberg–Menden–Neuenrade	352	239f	EVU: DB Regio NRW
438	Ruhr-Eder Railway in part	Dortmund–Bestwig–Winterberg	355	238e	EVU: DB Regio NRW
439	Upland Railway	Brilon Wald–Willingen–Korbach; NRW tariff: PauschalPreisTickets Brilon Wald–Willingen	532	198e	EVU: DB-Kurhessenbahn
440	Ruhr-Sieg Railway	Hagen–Werdohl–Finnentrop–Siegen	360	239	Former Bergisch-Märkische Eisenbahn; EVU: Abellio Rail NRW
442	Bigge Valley Railway	Finnentrop–Olpe	361	230h	Former Bergisch-Märkische Eisenbahn; EVU: DB Regio NRW
443	Ruhr–Sieg railway, Kreuztal–Cölbe railway, Erndtebrück–Bad Berleburg railway	Siegen–Erndtebrück–Bad Berleburg	363	239n/p	EVU: DB Regio NRW
445	Dill Railway	Siegen–Dillenburg–Gießen; NRW tariff: RelationsPreisTickets Rudersdorf (Siegen) nach Warburg über Giessen and Kassel and PauschalPreisTickets gelten nur bis Rudersdorf (Siegen)	360	251	Former CME; EVU: DB Regio NRW
447	Ruhrort Railway	Oberhausen–Duisburg-Ruhrort	383	22f	Former CME; EVU:
449	Der Wedauer	Duisburg Hbf–Duisburg-Entenfang	385	232a	EVU: DB Regio NRW
450.1	Rhine-Ruhr S-Bahn: S1	Düsseldorf–Düsseldorf Airport–Duisburg–Essen–Bochum–Dortmund	391		EVU: DB Regio NRW
450.2	Rhine-Ruhr S-Bahn: S2	Duisburg / Essen / Gelsenkirchen / Recklinghausen–Herne–Dortmund	392		EVU: DB Regio NRW
450.3	Rhine-Ruhr S-Bahn: S3	Oberhausen–Mülheim–Essen–Hattingen	393	227/230b	section Steele-Hattingen section der Ruhrtal Railway; EVU: DB Regio NRW
450.4	Rhine-Ruhr S-Bahn: S4	Lütgendortmund–Königsborn–Unna	294	232	EVU: DB Regio NRW
450.5	Rhine-Ruhr S-Bahn: S5	Dortmund–Witten–Wetter (Ruhr)–Hagen (Westf.)	330	233	EVU: DB Regio NRW
450.6	Rhine-Ruhr S-Bahn: S6	Cologne-Nippes–Cologne Hbf–Langenfeld– Düsseldorf–Ratingen Ost–Essen	396	227/231	section Düsseldorf–Essen-Werden: section der Ruhrtal railway EVU: DB Regio NRW
450.8	Rhine-Ruhr S-Bahn: S8	Mönchengladbach–Düsseldorf–Wuppertal–Hagen	398		EVU: DB Regio NRW
450.9	Rhine-Ruhr S-Bahn: S9	Recklinghausen / Haltern am See-Gladbeck–Bottrop–Essen– Velbert-Langenberg–Wuppertal-Hagen	381	230/236	EVU: Abellio NRW
450.11	Rhine-Ruhr S-Bahn: S11	Düsseldorf Airport Terminal–Düsseldorf–Neuss –Cologne–Bergisch Gladbach	491	240b/242	EVU: DB Regio NRW
450.12	Rhine-Ruhr S-Bahn: S12	Düren–Horrem–Cologne–Troisdorf–Siegburg/Bonn–Au			EVU: DB Regio NRW
450.13	Rhine-Ruhr S-Bahn: S13	Horrem–Cologne–Cologne/Bonn Airport–Troisdorf	---	---	EVU: DB Regio NRW
450.28	Rhine-Ruhr S-Bahn: S28	Kaarster See–Neuss–Düsseldorf–Mettmann	401/472	228b/242d	EVU: Regiobahn GmbH
455	Köln-Deutz–Gruiten, Gruiten–Elberfeld, Elberfeld–Dortmund, Hagen–Hamm, Münster–Hamm	Cologne–Wuppertal–Hagen–Hamm–Dortmund / Münster	400,330,280	228	Former Rhenish railway EVU: DB Regio NRW
458	Wuppertal-Oberbarmen–Solingen railway (Der Müngstener)	Wuppertal–Remscheid–Solingen	410	229	EVU: DB Regio NRW
459	Agger Valley Railway	Cologne–Overath–Gummersbach–Marienheide	415	240	EVU: DB Regio NRW
460	Sieg Railway	Cologne–Au–Betzdorf–Siegen; NRW tariff: RelationsPreisTickets and PauschalPreisTickets Au (Sieg)–Niederschelden Nord	420	251	Former CME; EVU: DB Regio NRW
461	Oberwesterwald Railway, Engers–Au railway	Au–Altenkirchen–Limburg; NRW tariff: PauschalPreisTickets Geilhausen–Ingelbach	424	251d/e	EVU: vectus Verkehrsgesellschaft
462	Heller Valley Railway	Betzdorf–Haiger–Dillenburg; NRW tariff: RelationsPreisTickets and PauschalPreisTickets Betzdorf–Struthütten	365	251	Former CME; EVU: HellertalBahn GmbH
463	Daade Valley Railway	Betzdorf–Daaden; NRW tariff: PauschalPreisTickets Betzdorf–Daaden	422	251g	EVU: Westerwaldbahn
465	Cologne–Mönchengladbach Railway, East Rhine Railway, Neuwied–Koblenz railway	Mönchengladbach–Cologne–Cologne/Bonn Airport / Porz (Rhine)–Neuwied–Koblenz; NRW tariff: PauschalPreisTickets Bad Honnef (Rhein)–Linz (Rhein)	610	250	Former Rhenish railway EVU: DB Regio NRW
466	East Rhine Railway, Neuwied–Koblenz railway	Koblenz–Rüdesheim–Wiesbaden	611	250	Former Nassauische Staats Railway; EVU: DB Regio AG
467	Siebengebirge Railway	Bad Honnef–Königswinter–Ramersdorf–Bonn Central Station–St. Augustin–Siegburg	497/498	253a/b	EVU: Electric railways of Bonn and Rhein-Sieg county
470	West Rhine Railway	Köln Hauptbahnhof–Bonn Hauptbahnhof–Remagen–Koblenz Hauptbahnhof–Mainz Hauptbahnhof; NRW tariff: PauschalPreisTickets Bonn-Mehlem–Remagen	600	249	Former Rhenish railway EVU: DB Regio NRW
471	Main Railway	Mainz Hauptbahnhof–Frankfurt Airport Long-distance Train Station–Frankfurt Airport Regional Train Station–Frankfurt (Main) Hauptbahnhof	600	249	Former Rhenish railway EVU: DB Regio GmbH
472	Cologne–Rhine/Main high-speed railway	Cologne–Siegburg/Bonn–Montabaur–Limburg Süd–Frankfurt South Station / Frankfurt Central Station / Frankfurt Airport Long-distance Train Station / Mainz	---	---	Opened 2002
473.1	Rheinufer Railway	Niehl–Cologne Dom/Hbf–Wesseling–Bonn Hbf–Bonn-Bad Godesberg	494	252	Former Cologne-Bonn railway EIU: HGK; EVU: KVB, SWB
473.2	Vorgebirge Railway	Cologne-Thielenbruch–Cologne Dom/Hbf–Brühl Mitte–Bonn Hbf	494	252a	Former Cologne-Bonn railway EIU: HGK; EVU: KVB, SWB
474	Eifel Railway	Cologne–Euskirchen–Gerolstein–Trier; NRW tariff: PauschalPreisTickets Dahlem (Eifel)–Gerolstein	430	248	Former Rhenish railway EVU: DB Regio NRW
475	Voreifel Railway and Erft Valley Railway	Bonn–Euskirchen–Bad Münstereifel	433	247e	EVU: DB Regio NRW
477	Ahr Valley Railway	Ahrbrück–Remagen (– Bonn); NRW tariff: PauschalPreisTickets Ahrbrück–Remagen	601	248g	Former Rhenish railway EVU: DB Regio NRW
478	Cross Eifel Railway	Kaisersesch–Mayen–Andernach	602	248m	EVU: DB Regio
12478	Cross Eifel Railway	Gerolstein–Daun–Kaisersesch	602		EVU: Currently closed
479	Hunsrück Railway	Boppard–Emmelshausen	606	264b	
480	Cologne-Aachen high-speed railway	Cologne–Horrem–Düren–Eschweiler–Aachen	440	247	Former Rhenish railway EVU: DB Regio NRW
481	Erft Railway, Düren–Neuss railway	Cologne / Horrem–Bedburg– Grevenbroich–Neuss–Düsseldorf	441,461	246b/247a	EVU: DB Regio NRW
482	Euregiobahn	Heerlen (NL)/Alsdorf-Poststraße–Herzogenrath–Aachen–Stolberg–Stolberg-Altstadt/ Eschweiler-Talbahnhof–Eschweiler-Weisweiler–Langerwehe–Düren		245c/247f	EVU: DB Regio NRW
483	Rur Valley Railway	Linnich–Jülich–Düren	443	245a	EVU: Rurtalbahn GmbH
484	Rur Valley Railway	Düren–Lendersdorf–Heimbach	444	247d	EVU: Rurtalbahn GmbH
485	Aachen–Mönchengladbach railway, Mönchengladbach–Düsseldorf railway, Düsseldorf–Elberfeld railway, Elberfeld–Dortmund railway	Aachen/Venlo–Mönchengladbach– Düsseldorf–Hagen	450	245(228	Former Bergisch-Märkische Eisenbahn; EVU: DB Regio NRW
487	Iron Rhine	Mönchengladbach–Dalheim	457	245a	EVU: DB Regio NRW
495	West Lower Rhine Railway	Kleve–Krefeld–Düsseldorf / Cologne	470	242a	former Rhenish railway EVU: DB Regio NRW
498	Lower Rhine Railway	Xanten–Moers–Duisburg	475	243	EVU: DB Regio NRW

=== Saxony/Thuringia region (500 to 599) ===
As at timetable period 2016/2017

Number (KBS)	Name	Route	KBS -1992 (DR)	Remarks
500	Leipzig–Dresden railway	Leipzig Hbf–Riesa–Dresden Hbf	320	
501.1	S-Bahn Mitteldeutschland: S 1	Wurzen–Leipzig–Leipzig Miltitzer Allee		
501.2	S-Bahn Mitteldeutschland: S 2	Gaschwitz–Leipzig-Connewitz–Leipzig–Delitzsch–Bitterfeld		
501.3	S-Bahn Mitteldeutschland: S 3	Halle–Schkeuditz–Leipzig–Leipzig-Stötteritz		
501.4	S-Bahn Mitteldeutschland: S 4	Hoyerswerda–Torgau–Eilenburg–Leipzig–Borna–Geithain		
501.5	S-Bahn Mitteldeutschland: S 5 / S 5X Erfurt–Leipzig/Halle high-speed railway	Halle (Saale)–Leipzig/Halle Airport–Leipzig–Altenburg–Zwickau		
501.7	S-Bahn Mitteldeutschland: S 7	Halle-Nietleben–Halle (Saale) Hbf–Halle-Trotha		
502	Döllnitz Railway	Oschatz–Mügeln (b Oschatz) – Altmügeln		
503	S-Bahn Mitteldeutschland: S 4 / S 5 /S 5X	Leipzig–Markkleeberg–Geithain/Altenburg		
506	Riesa–Chemnitz railway	Leipzig–Döbeln–Meissen	330	
509	Lössnitzgrund Railway	Radebeul Ost–Moritzburg–Radeburg	308	
510	Dresden–Werdau railway	Dresden Hbf–Chemnitz Hbf–Zwickau Hbf–Plauen (Vogtland) Oberer Bahnhof–Hof Hbf	410	
510.3	Dresden S-Bahn: S 3	Dresden Hbf–Tharandt–Freiberg		
511	Dresden–Werdau railway	Flöha–Chemnitz–Glauchau (all traffic)	305	
513	Weisseritz Valley Railway (narrow gauge)	Freital–Hainsberg–Dippoldiswalde–Kipsdorf Spa	309	
514	Freiberger Mulde Valley Railway	Freiberg (Sachs)–Holzhau	415	
516		Chemnitz–Niederwiesa–Hainichen	417	
517	Annaberg-Buchholz–Flöha railway, Vejprty–Annaberg-Buchholz railway	Chemnitz–Flöha–Bärenstein–Vejprty	420	
518	Fichtelberg Railway	Cranzahl–Oberwiesenthal Spa	424	
519	Reitzenhain–Flöha railway	Chemnitz Hbf–Flöha–Pockau-Lengefeld–Olbernhau	425	
520	Chemnitz-Riesa railway	Berlin Zoologischer Garten–Riesa–Chemnitz Hbf	400	
522	Würschnitz Valley Railway	Chemnitz Hbf–Stollberg	418	EVU: City-Bahn Chemnitz
523	Stollberg–St. Egidien railway	Zwickau–Glauchau–St. Egidien–Lichtenstein–Stollberg		EVU: City-Bahn Chemnitz
524	Zwönitz Valley Railway	Chemnitz Hbf–Thalheim/Erzgebirge–Aue (Sachs)	440	
525	Neukieritzsch–Chemnitz railway	Leipzig–Bad Lausick–Geithain–Burgstädt–Chemnitz	430	EVU: DB Regio Südost, Transdev Germany, City-Bahn Chemnitz
529	Mulde Valley Railway Bus	Grossbothen–Glauchau/–Narsdorf		EIU: Deutsche Regionaleisenbahn
535	Zwickau–Schwarzenberg railway, Schwarzenberg–Johanngeorgenstadt railway	Zwickau Hbf–Aue–Johanngeorgenstadt		
539	Vogtland Railway	Herlasgrün/Zwickau Hbf–Falkenstein–Kraslice–Karlovy Vary/Adorf	511	EVU: Vogtlandbahn
540	Mid-German Connection (Gera–Gößnitz, Glauchau–Gößnitz, Dresden–Chemnitz lines)	Gera–Gößnitz–Altenburg/Glauchau/Zwickau	550	
540.1		Göttingen–Erfurt–Gera–Gößnitz–Glauchau		
541	Gera Süd–Weischlitz railway	Gera–Greiz–Plauen–Weischlitz	540	EVU: Vogtlandbahn
542	Werdau Forest Railway Bus	Wünschendorf (Elster)–Werdau West		EIU: Deutsche Regionaleisenbahn
543	Wisenta Railway Bus	Schönberg (Vogtl)–Schleiz West		EIU: Deutsche Regionaleisenbahn
544		Zwickau–Plauen–Hof/Bad Brambach–Cheb–Marktredwitz/Mariánské Lázně	470	
544.2		Marktredwitz–Cheb (all traffic)		
546	Werdau–Weida–Mehltheuer railway	Gera–Weida–Zeulenroda–Mehltheuer–Hof		
550	Leipzig-Gera: Leipzig–Gera–Saalfeld railway	Leipzig–Zeitz–Gera		EVU: Erfurter Bahn
550.2	Schiefergebirgs-Express; Schwarzatal-Express	Leipzig–Saalfeld–Blankenstein/Katzhütte		EVU: Erfurter Bahn
551	Weißenfels–Zeitz railway, Naumburg–Teuchern railway	Weissenfels / Naumburg–Teuchern–Deuben (b Zeitz)–Zeitz	608	EVU: Burgenlandbahn GmbH
555	Saalfeld-Gera: Leipzig–Gera–Saalfeld railway	Saalfeld–Weida–Gera	530	EVU: Erfurter Bahn
556	Thuringian Oberland Railway	Triptis–Ebersdorf-Friesau-Bad Lobenstein		EIU: Deutsche Regionaleisenbahn
557	Hockeroda–Unterlemnitz railway	Saalfeld–Bad Lobenstein–Blankenstein	565	EVU: Erfurter Bahn
558		Gera–Gera Süd–Weida (all traffic)		
559	Orla Railway	Jena–Orlamünde–Pössneck unt Bf	562	EVU: Erfurter Bahn
560	Saal Railway	Naumburg–Jena–Saalfeld	560	
561	Arnstadt–Saalfeld railway	Erfurt–Neudietendorf–Arnstadt–Saalfeld	621	EVU: Erfurter Bahn
562	Schwarza Valley Railway	Rottenbach–Obstfelderschmiede–Katzhütte	563	
563	Oberweissbach Mountain Railway	Obstfelderschmiede–Lichtenhain (a d B)–Cursdorf	564	
564	EVU: Südthüringenbahn	Neuhaus am Rennweg–Sonneberg	566	EVU: Südthüringenbahn
565	Weimar-Gera railway/ Holzland Railway/ Mitte-Deutschland-Verbindung	Erfurt–Weimar–Jena West–Jena-Göschwitz–Gera	550	
566	Erfurt–Ilmenau railway	Erfurt–Arnstadt–Ilmenau Bad–Stützerbach	622	EVU: Erfurter Bahn; Ilmenau Bad-Stützerbach only Sat, Sun
567	Max-und-Moritz railway Bus	Probstzella–Ernstthal (Rennsteig)		EIU: Deutsche Regionaleisenbahn
569	Werra Railway (to Eisfeld)	Meiningen–Grimmenthal–Eisfeld–Sonneberg	633	EVU: Südthüringenbahn
570	Neudietendorf–Ritschenhausen railway, Schweinfurt–Meiningen railway	Erfurt–Arnstadt–Grimmenthal–Meiningen/Ebenhausen–Würzburg	620	
570.1	Bus	Oberhof station–Oberhof Ort		
570.2	Bus	Gehlberg station–Gehlberg Ort		
570.5	Rodelblitz	Eisenach–Oberhof–Arnstadt		
571		Erfurt–Neudietendorf–Arnstadt–Plaue (all traffic)		
572	Ohra Railway	Gotha–Gräfenroda	614	
573	Zella-Mehlis–Wernshausen railway	Zella-Mehlis–Schmalkalden–Wernshausen	624	EVU: Südthüringenbahn
575	Werra Railway	Eisenach–Wernshausen–Meiningen	630	EVU: Südthüringenbahn
579	Ilm Valley Railway	Weimar–Kranichfeld		
580	Thuringian Railway	Erfurt–Weimar–Grossheringen–Naumburg		
581	Thuringian Railway	Halle–Merseburg–Weissenfels–Naumburg		
582	Leipzig–Grosskorbetha railway	Leipzig Hauptbahnhof–Weißenfels		
583		Erfurt-Weimar (all traffic)		
585	Unstrut Railway	Naumburg–Naumburg Ost–Nebra–Wangen	612	
585.1	Bus	Eisleben–Querfurt–Nebra–Rossleben		
586	Merseburg–Querfurt railway	Querfurt–Merseburg		
588	Merseburg–Schafstädt Merseburg–Halle-Nietleben	Schafstädt / Halle-Nietleben–Buna-Werke–Merseburg	604/601	
590	Halle-Kassel railway	Nordhausen-Sangerhausen–Röblingen am See-Halle	660	
592	Berga-Kelbra–Stolberg (Harz) railway	Berga-Kelbra–Stolberg (Harz)	662	
592.1	Bus	Berga-Kelbra–Stolberg (Harz)		
594	Pfefferminz Railway	Sömmerda-Grossheringen	651	
597		Wolkramshausen-Nordhausen (all traffic)		

=== West Thuringia/Hesse/Nordbaden/Rhineland-Palatinate/Saarland Region (600 to 699) ===
(former RBD Erfurt, Bundesbahn divisions Frankfurt and Saarbrücken, see also: List of RMV lines)

Number (KBS)	Name	Routes	KBS -1992	KBS -1970	Remarks
600	Halle-Kassel railway	Nordhausen–Eichenberg	660		
601	Nordhausen–Erfurt railway	Wolkramshausen–Erfurt	640		
603	Erfurt–Bad Langensalza railway	Kühnhausen–Bad Langensalza	666		
604	Gotha–Leinefelde railway	Gotha–Leinefelde	645		
605	Thuringian Railway	Erfurt–Eisenach-Bebra	605		
606	Friedrichroda Railway	Fröttstädt–Friedrichroda	616		
610	Fulda Valley Railway and Bebra–Fulda railway	Kassel–Bebra–Fulda	500	192	
611	Halle-Kassel railway	Kassel–Göttingen	502	198f	
612	Volkmarsen–Vellmar-Obervellmar railway, Warburg–Sarnau railway	Kassel–Korbach	530	198	
613	Bebra–Göttingen railway	Bebra–Göttingen	500	202	
615	Kinzig Valley Railway	Hanau–Fulda	501	192	
616	Fulda–Gersfeld railway	Fulda–Gersfeld	507	192p	
620	Main-Weser Railway	Giessen–Kassel; NRW tariff: RelationsPreisTickets Rudersdorf (Siegen)– (Giessen–Kassel–) Warburg	520	196	
621	Edersee Railway	Wabern–Bad Wildungen	532	198b	EVU: DB Kurhessenbahn
622	Burgwald Railway	Sarnau–Frankenberg (Eder)	525	198	EVU: DB Kurhessenbahn
622.1	Ederbergland Railway (actually Upper Eder Valley Railway)	Frankenberg (Eder)–Battenberg-Auhammer	364		EVU: DB Kurhessenbahn
623	Upper Lahn Valley Railway	Marburg–Bad Laasphe–Erndtebrück; NRW tariff: RelationsPreisTickets Marburg–Bad Laasphe	362	239g	EVU: DB Kurhessenbahn
624	Aar-Salzböde railway	Niederwalgern–Hartenrod-Herborn	368	251b	
625	Lahntal railway	Giessen–Wetzlar–Limburg–Koblenz	540	195	
627	Main-Lahn Railway	Frankfurt and Wiesbaden–Limburg	543	195b	
629	Unterwesterwald Railway	Staffel–Siershahn	423	251e	
630	Main-Weser Railway	Frankfurt–Giessen	518	196	
631	Lahn-Kinzig Railway	Giessen–Gelnhausen	511	193h	
632	Horloff Valley Railway	Friedberg–Nidda and Wölfersheim-Södel	512	193k	EVU: HLB (ex BLE)
633	Friedberg-Hanau railway	Friedberg–Hanau	521	196b	EVU: HLB (ex BLE)
634	Nidder Valley Railway	Bad Vilbel–Glauburg-Stockheim	515	193d	
635	Vogelsberg Railway	Giessen–Fulda	510	193	
636	Friedberg–Friedrichsdorf railway	Friedrichsdorf–Friedberg	546	196g	EVU: HLB (ex BLE)
637	Taunus Railway	Frankfurt–Brandoberndorf	545	196g	EVU: HLB (ex FKE)
640	Frankfurt-Hanau railway	Frankfurt–Frankfurt East–Hanau–Aschaffenburg	800	416	
641	Odenwald Railway (Hesse)	Hanau/Darmstadt–Eberbach	555	317f	EVU: VIAS GmbH
642	Kahlgrund Railway	Hanau–Kahl–Schöllkrippen	557	416a	EVU: HLB
643	Soden Railway	Frankfurt-Höchst–Bad Soden am Taunus	584	195c	EVU: HLB (ex FKE)
645.1	Rhine-Main S-Bahn: S 1 (Taunus Railway)	Wiesbaden–Ober-Roden	581		
645.2	Rhine-Main S-Bahn: S 2	Niedernhausen–Dietzenbach	582		
645.3	Rhine-Main S-Bahn: S 3	Bad Soden am Taunus–Darmstadt	583		
645.4	Rhine-Main S-Bahn: S 4	Kronberg (Taunus)–Langen (Hess)	583		
645.5	Rhine-Main S-Bahn: S 5 (Homburg Railway)	Friedrichsdorf–Frankfurt South	585		
645.6	Rhine-Main S-Bahn: S 6	Friedberg–Frankfurt South	586		
645.7	Rhine-Main S-Bahn: S 7	Frankfurt–Riedstadt-Goddelau	551		
645.8	Rhine-Main S-Bahn: S 8	Wiesbaden–Mainz–Hanau	588		
645.9	Rhine-Main S-Bahn: S 9	Wiesbaden–Mainz-Kastel–Hanau	588		
646	Königstein Railway	Königstein im Taunus–Frankfurt	595	195d	EVU: HLB (ex FKE)
647	Dreieich Railway	Dreieich-Buchschlag–Dieburg	554	317c	
650	Main-Neckar Railway	Frankfurt–Darmstadt–Mannheim/Heidelberg	550	317	
651	Main-Rhine Railway	Wiesbaden –Aschaffenburg	552	317	
653	Nibelungen Railway	Worms–Bensheim	558	315f	
654	Weschnitz Valley Railway	Weinheim–Mörlenbach–Fürth (Odenwald)	559	315b	
655	Mannheim–Frankfurt railway and Darmstadt–Worms railway	Frankfurt–Biblis–Mannheim/Worms	551	315a	
660	Mainz–Ludwigshafen railway	Mainz–Worms–Ludwigshafen	660	274	
661	Alzey-Mainz railway	Alzey–Mainz	655	273	
661.1	Donnersberg Railway	Alzey–Kirchheimbolanden			
662	Rheinhessen Railway	Bingen–Alzey–Worms	656	273a	
662.1	Zeller Valley Railway	Langmeil–Monsheim			
663	all traffic Alzey–Armsheim	Alzey–Armsheim			
665	Palatine Ludwig Railway, Rhine Valley Railway	Schifferstadt–Mannheim–Heidelberg	702	300d	
665.1	Rhine-Neckar S-Bahn: S 1	Homburg–Kaiserslautern-Osterburken	670/560		
665.2	Rhine-Neckar S-Bahn: S 2	Kaiserslautern–Mosbach	670/560		
665.3	Rhine-Neckar S-Bahn: S 3	Speyer–Karlsruhe	675/771		
665.4	Rhine-Neckar S-Bahn: S 4	Speyer–Bruchsal	675/771		
666	Eis Valley Railway	Ramsen–Eiswoog–Grünstadt–Freinsheim–Frankenthal	666	274m	
667	Palatine Northern Railway	Monsheim–Grünstadt–Freinsheim–Bad Dürkheim–Neustadt	667	274m	
668	Rhine-Haardt Railway	Bad Dürkheim–Ludwigshafen–Mannheim	668	274k	narrow gauge railway
669	Oberrheinische Eisenbahn (Upper Rhine Railway, OEG)	Mannheim–Heidelberg–Weinheim OEG-Mannheim	568	300g	narrow gauge railway
670	Mannheim–Saarbrücken railway	Saarbrücken–Mannheim-Heidelberg	670	279	
671	Landstuhl–Kusel railway	Landstuhl–Kusel	671	272c	EVU: trans regio
672	Biebermühl Railway/Alsenz Valley Railway/Nahe Valley Railway	Pirmasens–Kaiserslautern–Bad Kreuznach–Bingen	650	272	
673	Lauter Valley Railway	Kaiserslautern–Lauterecken-Grumbach	652	272b	
674	Schwarzbach Valley Railway, ex South Palatinate railway	Pirmasens–Saarbrücken	680	280	
675	Queich Valley Railway ex South Palatinate railway	Pirmasens–Landau	684	282	
675.1	Wieslauter Railway	Hinterweidenthal–Bundenthal-Rumbach		280d	
676	Palatine Maximilian Railway	Neustadt an der Weinstrasse–Karlsruhe	687	282	
677	Schifferstadt–Wörth railway	Schifferstadt–Wörth (Rhein)	675	279b	
677.1	Bienwald Railway	Wörth (Rhein)–Lauterbourg		279e	
678	Kurbad Line	Winden–Bad Bergzabern	683	280a	
679	Palatine Maximilian Railway	Winden–Wissembourg		282	
680	Nahe Valley Railway, Gau Algesheim–Bad Kreuznach railway	Gau-Algesheim / Bingen–Saarbrücken	640	271	Zug: Rhein-Nahe-Express
681	Fischbach Valley Railway / Prims Valley Railway	Saarbrücken–Lebach-[Jabach	645	267	
682	Forbach Railway	Saarbrücken–Stiring-Wendel	645	267	
683	Prims Valley Railway, Homburg–Neunkirchen railway	Illingen (Saar)–Homburg (Saar)	643	271f	
684	Upper Saar Valley Railway	Saarbrücken–Sarreguemines	639	266a	co-used by the Saarbahn
685	Saar Railway	Saarbrücken–Trier	630	265	
687	Nied Valley Railway	Dillingen/Saar–Niedaltdorf	633	265d	
688		Ehrang–Konz	631	265a	
690	Koblenz–Trier railway	Koblenz–Trier	620	263	
691	Moselle Wine Railway	Bullay–Traben-Trarbach	621	263a	
692	Upper Moselle Valley Railway	Trier–Perl	626	263f	
693	Moselle-Syre Valley Railway	Trier–Wasserbillig–Luxembourg	620	263d	

=== Baden-Württemberg region (700 to 799) ===
(former Bundesbahn divisions Karlsruhe and Stuttgart)

Number (KBS)	Name	Route	KBS -1992	KBS -1970	Remarks
700	Rhine Valley Railway	Mannheim–Schwetzingen–Graben-Neudorf–Karlsruhe	701		
701	Baden Mainline/Baden-Kurpfalz Railway	Heidelberg–Karlsruhe	702		
702	Baden Mainline/Rhine Valley Railway	Karlsruhe–Offenburg–Freiburg–Basel	700		EVU: DB Fernverkehr, DB Regio Baden-Württemberg and Ortenau-S-Bahn
703		Müllheim (Baden)–Neuenburg (Baden)–Mulhouse Ville	726		
704	Bruhrain Railway	Speyer–Graben-Neudorf–Bruchsal	703		
705	Neckar Valley Railway	Mannheim–Heidelberg–Eberbach–Heilbronn	560	303	
706	Elsenz Valley Railway	Heidelberg–Meckesheim–Heilbronn	561	303a	
707	Meckesheim–Neckarelz railway*	Meckesheim–Neckarbischofsheim Nord–Aglasterhausen / Hüffenhardt	562	303d,f	EVU: Südwestdeutsche Verkehrs-Aktiengesellschaft
710	Stadtbahn Karlsruhe	Karlsruhe (all traffic)			
710.1	AVG S1 / S11 on the Hardt Railway / Alb Valley Railway	Hochstetten–Karlsruhe–Bad Herrenalb / Ittersbach	711, 712		
710.3	AVG S31 / S32 on the Kraich Valley Railway / Katzbach Railway	Rastatt–Karlsruhe–Bruchsal–Menzingen / Odenheim	707/708		
710.4	AVG S4 on the Crailsheim–Heilbronn railway / Kraichgau Railway / Rhine Valley Railway	Öhringen–Heilbronn–Eppingen–Karlsruhe–Achern	776	304a	
710.41	AVG S41 on the Murg Valley Railway	Karlsruhe–Rastatt–Freudenstadt Hauptbahnhof	713		
710.42	AVG S4 on the Crailsheim–Heilbronn railway / Kraichgau Railway	Öhringen–Heilbronn–Eppingen (– Karlsruhe–Achern)	776	304a	
710.5	AVG S5 on the Karlsruhe–Mühlacker Railway / Württemberg Western Railway	Wörth–Karlsruhe–Pforzheim (– Bietigheim-Bissingen)	684/770		
710.6	AVG S6 on the Enz Valley Railway	Pforzheim–Bad Wildbad	775	302a	
710.9	AVG S9 on the Württemberg Western Railway	Bruchsal–Bretten–Mühlacker	770	315	
714	Steinsfurt-Eppingen railway	Eppingen–Sinsheim–Meckesheim–Heidelberg Hauptbahnhof	561, 564		
717	Acher Valley Railway	Achern–Ottenhöfen im Schwarzwald	715		EVU: Südwestdeutsche Verkehrs-Aktiengesellschaft
718	Rench Valley Railway	Offenburg–Appenweier–Bad Griesbach	717		EVU: Ortenau-S-Bahn
719	Appenweier–Strasbourg railway	Strasbourg–Kehl–Appenweier–Offenburg	716		EVU: DB Fernverkehr, DB ZugBus Alb-Bodensee (RAB), Ortenau-S-Bahn
720	Black Forest Railway	Offenburg–Villingen–Singen–Konstanz	720		EVU: DB Fernverkehr, DB ZugBus Alb-Bodensee (RAB), Ortenau-S-Bahn
721	Kinzig Valley Railway	Offenburg–Hausach–Freudenstadt	720/721		EVU: Ortenau-S-Bahn
722	Harmersbach Valley Railway	Biberach (Baden)–Oberharmersbach-Riersbach	722		EVU: Südwestdeutsche Verkehrs-Aktiengesellschaft
723	Kaiserstuhl Railway	Breisach–Endingen am Kaiserstuhl–Riegel am Kaiserstuhl	723		EVU: Südwestdeutsche Verkehrs-Aktiengesellschaft
724	Kaiserstuhl Railway	Endingen am Kaiserstuhl–Gottenheim	724		EVU: Südwestdeutsche Verkehrs-Aktiengesellschaft
725	Bad Krozingen–Münstertal railway	Bad Krozingen–Münstertal	725		EVU: Südwestdeutsche Verkehrs-Aktiengesellschaft
726	Elz Valley Railway; Breisgau-S-Bahn	Elzach–Waldkirch–Denzlingen–Freiburg	718		EVU: Breisgau-S-Bahn
727	Höllental Railway	Freiburg–Neustadt–Donaueschingen	727		
728	Three Lakes Railway	Freiburg–Neustadt–Seebrugg	728		
729	Freiburg–Colmar railway	Freiburg–Gottenheim–Breisach	719		EVU: Breisgau-S-Bahn
730	High Rhine Railway	Basel Bad. Bf.–Waldshut–Schaffhausen–Singen	730		
731	High Rhine Railway, Radolfzell–Mengen railway, Stahringen–Friedrichshafen railway	Singen–Radolfzell–Friedrichshafen	730		
732	Radolfzell–Mengen railway	Radolfzell–Stockach–Mengen			EVU: Hohenzollerische Landesbahn
734	Weil am Rhein–Lörrach railway	Steinen–Lörrach–Weil am Rhein	732		EVU: SBB GmbH
735	Wiese Valley Railway	Basel–Zell im Wiesental	733		EVU: SBB GmbH
740	Stuttgart–Horb railway, Plochingen–Immendingen railway	Stuttgart–Eutingen im Gäu–Horb–Rottweil–Tuttlingen–Singen	740		EVU: DB ZugBus Alb-Bodensee (RAB) and Hohenzollerische Landesbahn
741	Eutingen im Gäu–Freudenstadt railway	Eutingen im Gäu–Freudenstadt	721		
742	Rottweil–Villingen railway	Rottweil–Villingen (Schwarzwald)	742		EVU: DB ZugBus Alb-Bodensee (RAB) and Hohenzollerische Landesbahn
742.1	Trossingen Railway	Trossingen station – Trossingen-Stadt	742		EVU: Hohenzollerische Landesbahn
743	Wutach Valley Railway	Waldshut-Tiengen–Stühlingen-Blumberg-Rottweil	743		EVU: DB ZugBus Alb-Bodensee (RAB) and Hohenzollerische Landesbahn
750	Fils Valley Railway	Stuttgart–Plochingen–Göppingen–Ulm	900		
751	Ulm–Friedrichshafen railway, Friedrichshafen–Lindau railway, Lindau-Insel	Ulm–Biberach–Aulendorf–Ravensburg–Friedrichshafen	750		EVU: DB ZugBus Alb-Bodensee (RAB) and Bodensee-Oberschwaben railway
752	Öchsle	Warthausen–Ochsenhausen	754		(currently no timetable route number)
753	Württemberg Allgäu Railway, Kißlegg–Hergatz railway	Aulendorf–Kisslegg–Hergatz	980		
754	Altshausen–Schwackenreute railway	Altshausen–Schwackenreute		320b	
755	Ulm–Sigmaringen railway, Tübingen–Sigmaringen railway, Tuttlingen–Inzigkofen railway, Black Forest Railway (Baden)	Ulm–Ehingen (Donau)–Sigmaringen–Tuttlingen–Donaueschingen	755		
756		Ehingen / Münsingen–Schelklingen–Ulm–Memmingen	755/975		
757	Aalen–Ulm railway	Aalen–Heidenheim–Ulm	788		
759.1	Swabian Alb Railway	Münsingen–Gomadingen			
759.2	Reutlingen–Schelklingen railway	Ulm-Kleinengstingen–Gammertingen			EVU: Hohenzollerische Landesbahn
760	Neckar-Alb Railway	Stuttgart–Plochingen–Reutlingen–Tübingen	760		
761	Teck Railway	Wendlingen am Neckar–Kirchheim unter Teck–Oberlenningen	761		
762	Nürtingen–Neuffen railway	Nürtingen–Neuffen	762		EIU and EVU: WEG
763	Erms Valley Railway	Metzingen–Bad Urach	760		
764	Ammer Valley Railway	Herrenberg–Ammerbuch–Tübingen			EVU: ZÖA Zweckverband ÖPNV im Ammerland; EVU: DB ZugBus Alb-Bodensee GmbH (RAB)
765	Tübingen–Horb railway	Tübingen–Rottenburg am Neckar–Horb	765		
766	Tübingen–Sigmaringen railway, Herbertingen–Aulendorf railway	Tübingen–Hechingen–Balingen–Sigmaringen–Aulendorf	766		EVU: DB ZugBus Regionalverkehr Alb-Bodensee GmbH (RAB) and Hohenzollerische Landesbahn
768	Zollernalb Railway 2	Hechingen–Gammertingen–Sigmaringen	768		EVU: Hohenzollerische Landesbahn
769	Balingen–Rottweil railway	Balingen–Schömberg			EVU: Hohenzollerische Landesbahn
770	Württemberg Western Railway, Karlsruhe–Mühlacker railway	Stuttgart–Mühlacker–Pforzheim–Karlsruhe	770	304	
772	Maulbronn West–Maulbronn Stadt railway	Maulbronn West–Maulbronn Stadt	765/774		
774	Nagold Valley Railway	Pforzheim–Calw–Horb	774		
780	Franconia Railway	Würzburg and Neckarelz–Heilbronn–Stuttgart	780	311	
781	Main Valley Railway	Aschaffenburg–Miltenberg–Wertheim	802	416d/416h	EVU: Westfrankenbahn, KBS until 2007: 802
782	Tauber Valley Railway*, Tauberbahn	Wertheim–Lauda–Schrozberg–Crailsheim	782		EVU: Westfrankenbahn, KBS until 2007: 788
783	Crailsheim–Heilbronn railway	Heilbronn–Öhringen–Schwäbisch Hall–Crailsheim	785	312b	
784	Seckach–Miltenberg railway	Miltenberg–Walldürn–Seckach	566		EVU: Westfrankenbahn, KBS until 2007: 709
785	Waiblingen–Schwäbisch Hall railway	Stuttgart–Backnang–Crailsheim	785		bis 2007: 784
786	Stuttgart-Bad Cannstatt–Aalen railway **	Stuttgart–Schwäbisch Gmünd–Aalen (–Crailsheim–Nuremberg)	787		
786	Nuremberg–Crailsheim railway **	(Aalen – Goldshöfe–) Crailsheim – Ansbach – Nuremberg	787		see also KBS 891.7
790.1	Stuttgart S-Bahn S1	Plochingen–Stuttgart–Böblingen–Herrenberg	791		
790.11	Stuttgart-Untertürkheim–Kornwestheim railway	Kornwestheim–Stuttgart-Untertürkheim	798		
790.21	Wieslauf Valley Railway	Schorndorf–Rudersberg	786		EIU: Zweckverband Verkehrsverband Wieslauf Valley Railway (ZVVW); EVU: WEG
790.2-3	Stuttgart S-Bahn S2/S3	Schorndorf/Backnang–Waiblingen–Stuttgart–Stuttgart Airport–Filderstadt	793		
790.31	Backnang–Ludwigsburg railway	Marbach am Neckar–Backnang	794		
790.4-5	Stuttgart S-Bahn S4/S5	Marbach/Bietigheim-Bissingen–Ludwigsburg–Stuttgart-Schwabstrasse	795		
790.6	Stuttgart S-Bahn S6	Weil der Stadt–Leonberg–Stuttgart-Schwabstrasse	796		
790.61	Strohgäu Railway	Korntal–Hemmingen–Weissach	797		EIU and EVU: WEG
790.72	Schönbuch Railway	Böblingen–Holzgerlingen–Dettenhausen	799		EIU: Zweckverband Schönbuchbahn (ZVS); EVU: WEG

* This description is not used in the timetable, but is a commonly used name for the line.
** By Rems Railway only the section from Stuttgart to Aalen is implied today; KBS 786 includes the whole route to Nuremberg however. Originally the Rems Valley Railway ran further to Nördlingen (see KBS 995), this section is designated by the DB today as the Ries Railway (derived from the landscape of the Nördlinger Ries).

=== North Bavarian region (800 to 899) ===
(former Bundesbahn divisions Nuremberg, Regensburg)

Number (KBS)	Name	Route	KBS -1992	KBS -1970	Remarks
800	Main-Spessart Railway section of the Ludwig's Western Railway	Aschaffenburg–Gemünden (Main)–Würzburg	800	416	EVU: DB Regio Bayern
801	Flieden–Gemünden railway	(Fulda–)Flieden–Jossa–Gemünden (Main)	800		EVU: DB Regio Bayern
803	Franconian Saale Valley Railway	Gemünden (Main)–Bad Kissingen–Schweinfurt	812	418/418d	EVU: DB Regio Bayern, Erfurter Bahn
805	Nuremberg–Würzburg railway	Würzburg–Kitzingen–Neustadt (Aisch)–Fürth–Nuremberg	800	416	EVU: DB Regio Bayern
806	Neustadt an der Aisch–Steinach bei Rothenburg railway	Neustadt (Aisch)–Bad Windsheim–Steinach (bei Rothenburg)	807	415f	EVU: DB Regio Bayern
807	Zenn Valley Railway	Siegelsdorf–Wilhermsdorf–Markt Erlbach			EVU: DB Regio Bayern
808	Rangau Railway	Fürth–Zirndorf–Cadolzburg	891	414b	EVU: DB Regio Bayern
809	Lower Steigerwald Railway Bus	Kitzingen-Etwashausen–Gerolzhofen–Schweinfurt		418c	EIU: Deutsche Regionaleisenbahn
810	Würzburg–Bamberg railway section of Ludwig's Western Railway	Würzburg–Schweinfurt–Hassfurt–Bamberg	810	419	EVU: DB Regio Bayern
811		Würzburg–Rottendorf (All traffic)			
815	Erfurt–Schweinfurt railway	Schweinfurt–Ebenhausen–Bad Neustadt (Saale)–Meiningen / Grimmenthal	813	418	EVU: DB Regio Bayern, Erfurter Bahn
819	Upper Steigerwald Railway Bus	Strullendorf–Schlüsselfeld	824	414h	EIU: Deutsche Regionaleisenbahn
820	Coburg–Sonneberg railway and Nuremberg–Bamberg railway and Bamberg–Hof railway (section)	Sonneberg–Lichtenfels–Bamberg–Nuremberg	830 and 820	419b and 414	EVU: DB Regio Bayern
821	Forchheim–Behringersmühle railway	Forchheim (Oberfr)–Ebermannstadt	823	414g	EVU: DB Regio Bayern
826	Breitengüssbach–Maroldsweisach railway	Bamberg–Ebern	826	414m	EVU: DB Regio Bayern
831	Coburg–Bad Rodach railway	Coburg–Bad Rodach	833	419f	EVU: DB Regio Bayern
840	Franconian Forest Railway	Saalfeld (Saale)–Probstzella–Kronach–Lichtenfels	820	414	EVU: DB Regio Bayern
841	Bamberg–Hof railway (section)	Hochstadt-Marktzeuln–Lichtenfels (all traffic)		414	
850	Bamberg–Hof railway (section)	Lichtenfels–Neuenmarkt-Wirsberg–Hof	810	419	EVU: DB Regio Bayern; Schiefe Ebene
852	Bayreuth–Neuenmarkt-Wirsberg railway	Neuenmarkt-Wirsberg–Bayreuth	841	421	EVU: DB Regio Bayern
853	Münchberg–Selbitz railway	Münchberg–Helmbrechts	836	419n	EVU: DB Regio Bayern
855	Weiden–Oberkotzau railway Regensburg–Weiden railway	Hof–Marktredwitz–Weiden in der Oberpfalz–Schwandorf–Regensburg	850	425	EVU: DB Regio Bayern, Vogtlandbahn
857	Hof–Bad Steben railway	Hof–Naila–Bad Steben	837	425q	EVU: DB Regio Bayern
858	Cheb–Oberkotzau railway	Hof–Selb	853	425k	EVU: DB Regio Bayern
860	Nuremberg–Cheb railway Schnabelwaid–Bayreuth railway	Nuremberg–Neuhaus (Pegnitz)–Pegnitz–Bayreuth / Marktredwitz–Cheb	840	421	EVU: DB Regio Bayern
861	Gräfenberg Railway	Nuremberg Nordost–Heroldsberg–Eschenau–Gräfenberg	827	414c	EVU: DB Regio Bayern
862	Fichtelgebirge Railway	Bayreuth–Weidenberg	843	421e	EVU: DB Regio Bayern, EIU: Deutsche Regionaleisenbahn
863	Bayreuth–Warmensteinach railway	Weidenberg–Warmensteinach (currently no train service)	843	421e	EIU: Deutsche Regionaleisenbahn (DRE)
866	Nuremberg–Cheb railway (section)	Marktredwitz–Schirnding	840	421	EVU: Vogtlandbahn
867	Weiden–Bayreuth railway	Bayreuth–Kirchenlaibach–Marktredwitz–Weiden (Oberpf)	840/44	421f	EIU: DB Regio Bayern
870	Nuremberg–Schwandorf railway Neukirchen–Weiden railway	Nuremberg–Neukirchen–Weiden (Oberpf) / Amberg–Schwandorf	860	423/425e	EVU: DB Regio Bayern
875	Schwandorf–Furth im Wald railway	Schwandorf–Cham (Oberpf)–Furth im Wald	860	423	EVU: Oberpfalzbahn
876	Cham–Waldmünchen railway	Cham–Waldmünchen	863	423f	EVU: Oberpfalzbahn
877	Cham–Lam railway	Cham–Bad Kötzting–Lam	864	423g	EVU: Oberpfalzbahn
880	Nuremberg–Regensburg railway Regensburg–Passau railway	Nuremberg–Neumarkt (Oberpf)–Regensburg–Plattling–Passau	870	417	EVU: DB Regio Bayern
880.1	Wels–Passau railway	Wels–Passau (part)			EVU: Österreichische Bundesbahnen
881	Passau–Hauzenberg railway Bus	Passau–Hauzenberg/Obernzell			EIU: Deutsche Regionaleisenbahn
890.1	Nuremberg S-Bahn: S1	Nuremberg–Lauf (left Pegnitz)–Neukirchen	894	423	EIU: DB Regio Bayern
890.2	Nuremberg S-Bahn: S2	Nuremberg–Feucht–Altdorf (bei Nuremberg)	895	417c	EVU: DB Regio Bayern
890.3	Nuremberg S-Bahn: S3	Nuremberg–Schwabach–Roth		411	EVU: DB Regio Bayern
891.1	Nuremberg–Würzburg railway	Nuremberg–Fürth–Siegelsdorf–Neustadt (Aisch)–Markt Bibart		416	EVU: DB Regio Bayern
	Zenngrund Railway	Fürth–Siegelsdorf–Markt Erlbach	809	416a	EVU: DB Regio Bayern
891.2	Nuremberg–Bamberg railway	Nuremberg–Fürth–Erlangen–Baiersdorf–Forchheim (Oberfr)		414	EVU: DB Regio Bayern
891.3	Nuremberg–Cheb railway	Nuremberg–Neunkirchen–Pegnitz	893	421	EVU: DB Regio Bayern
	Schnaittach Valley Railway	(Nuremberg–)Neunkirchen–Simmelsdorf-Hüttenbach	893	421a	EVU: DB Regio Bayern
891.7	Nuremberg–Crailsheim railway	Nuremberg–Ansbach–Crailsheim	897	420	EVU: DB Regio Bayern

=== North Bavarian/South Bavarian region (900 to 999) ===
(former Bundesbahn divisions Munich, Augsburg, parts of Regensburg and Nuremberg)

Number (KBS)	Name	Route	KBS -1992	KBS -1970	Remarks
900	Nuremberg–Munich high-speed railway	Nuremberg–Ingolstadt–Munich			High-speed line
901	Nuremberg–Munich high-speed railway	Nuremberg–Allersberg–Ingolstadt–Munich			Regional traffic since December 2006 on the high-speed line
905	Bavarian Forest Railway	Plattling–Zwiesel–Bayerisch Eisenstein		426	
906	Zwiesel–Grafenau railway	Zwiesel–Grafenau		426f	
907	Zwiesel–Bodenmais railway	Zwiesel–Bodenmais		426g	
910	Nuremberg–Augsburg railway (section)	Nuremberg–Roth–Treuchtlingen		411	
911	Gredl Railway	Roth–Hilpoltstein		411m	
912	Seenland Railway	Pleinfeld–Gunzenhausen		411f	
920	Treuchtlingen–Würzburg railway	Treuchtlingen–Ansbach–Würzburg		415	
921		Steinach (b Rothenburg) – Rothenburg ob der Tauber	808	415a	
922	Wicklesgreuth–Windsbach railway	Wicklesgreuth–Windsbach		420b	
930	Munich–Regensburg railway	Munich–Landshut–Regensburg		424	
931	Landshut–Plattling railway	Munich–Landshut–Plattling–Passau	930	424/426/417	Donau-Isar Express (from December 2009)
932	Neufahrn–Radldorf railway, Straubing–Miltach railway	(Niederbayern)–Straubing–Bogen		424d	
940	Munich–Mühldorf railway	Munich–Mühldorf		427	EVU: SüdostBayernBahn
941	Mühldorf–Simbach railway	Mühldorf–Simbach		427	EVU: SüdostBayernBahn
942	Mühldorf–Burghausen railway	Mühldorf–Burghausen		427d	EVU: SüdostBayernBahn
943	Mühldorf–Freilassing railway	Mühldorf–Freilassing		427k	2005: included in 945
944	Rosenheim–Mühldorf railway	Mühldorf–Rosenheim		427r	EVU: SüdostBayernBahn
945	Neumarkt-Sankt Veit–Landshut railway, Mühldorf–Pilsting railway (section), Mühldorf–Freilassing railway	Salzburg–Mühldorf–Landshut		427k	EVU: SüdostBayernBahn
946	Rot Valley Railway	Mühldorf–Pfarrkirchen–Pocking–Passau		427g	EVU: SüdostBayernBahn
947	Traun-Alz railway	Mühldorf–Garching–Traunstein		427k/427n	EVU: SüdostBayernBahn
948	Filzenexpress	(Grafing–) Ebersberg–Wasserburg am Inn		428b	
950	Munich–Kufstein railway	Munich–Rosenheim–Kufstein		428	Part of the Bavarian Maximilian's Railway
951	Munich–Rosenheim railway, Rosenheim–Salzburg railway	Munich–Rosenheim–Salzburg		428	Part of the Bavarian Maximilian Railway
952	Chiemgau Railway	Prien–Aschau		428f	
953	Traunstein-Ruhpolding railway	Traunstein–Ruhpolding		428k	
954	Freilassing–Berchtesgaden railway	Salzburg–Freilassing–Berchtesgaden		428m	Salzburg S-Bahn: S3
955	Bavarian Oberland Railway	Munich–Holzkirchen–Bayrischzell		429/429a	EVU: Bayerische Oberlandbahn
956	Bavarian Oberland Railway	Munich–Holzkirchen–Schaftlach–Lenggries		429	EVU: Bayerische Oberlandbahn
957	Bavarian Oberland Railway	Munich–Holzkirchen–Schaftlach–Tegernsee		429	EVU: Bayerische Oberlandbahn
958	Mangfall Valley Railway	Holzkirchen–Rosenheim		429b	
959	Traunstein–Waging railway	Traunstein–Waging		428h	
960	Munich–Garmisch-Partenkirchen, Mittenwald Railway	(Munich–) Weilheim–Innsbruck		402	
961	Kochelsee Railway	(Tutzing–) Penzberg–Kochel		402a	
962	Pfaffenwinkel Railway	(Weilheim–) Peiting–Schongau		404c	
963	Ammergau Railway	(Murnau–) Bad Kohlgrub–Oberammergau		402b	
970	Munich–Buchloe railway, Buchloe–Lindau railway	Munich–Kempten–Lindau		406	Part of the Ludwig South-North Railway
970.1	Allgäu-Franken-Express	Lindau–Augsburg–Nuremberg			
971	Buchloe–Lindau railway, Augsburg–Buchloe railway, Buchloe–Memmingen railway, Leutkirch–Memmingen railway, Buchloe–Lindau railway, Kißlegg–Hergatz railway	Augsburg–Memmingen–Lindau		405/306a	
974	Biessenhofen–Füssen railway	Buchloe–Füssen		406/406c	
975	Neu-Ulm–Kempten railway, Immenstadt–Oberstdorf railway	Ulm–Memmingen–Kempten–Oberstdorf		407/406/406g	
976	Ausserfern Railway	Kempten–Reutte in Tirol–Garmisch-Partenkirchen		406e/402c	
978	Mittelschwaben Railway	Mindelheim–Krumbach–Günzburg		405f	
980	Bavarian Maximilian Railway	Ulm–Augsburg–Munich		410	
982	Nuremberg–Augsburg railway (partly)	Treuchtlingen–Donauwörth–Augsburg		411	
983	Paar Valley Railway	Augsburg–Ingolstadt		411d	
984	Stauden Railway	Gessertshausen–Türkheim		405c	2005: only a museum railway no. 12981
985	Ammersee Railway	(Augsburg–) Mering–Weilheim		404	
986	Lechfeld Railway	Landsberg (Lech)–Kaufering–Augsburg		405/404a	
987		Augsburg–Buchloe–Bad Wörishofen		405/405b	
989	Augsburg–Nördlingen railway Stuttgart-Bad Cannstatt–Nördlingen railway	Aalen–Nördlingen–Donauwörth		324/411f	
990	Ingolstadt–Treuchtlingen railway	Treuchtlingen–Ingolstadt–Munich		413	
991	Eichstätt station–Eichstätt Stadt railway	Eichstätt station–Eichstätt Stadt		413f	
993	Regensburg–Ingolstadt railway Ingolstadt–Neuoffingen railway	Regensburg–Ingolstadt–Donauwörth–Ulm		412/411e/410	
999	S-Bahn Munich main route	Munich Pasing–Munich Hauptbahnhof–Ostbahnhof			
999.1	Munich S-Bahn: S1	Freising/Munich Airport–Munich Hauptbahnhof–Ostbahnhof			
999.2	Munich S-Bahn: S2	Petershausen–Munich Hauptbahnhof–Erding		427a	
999.4	Munich S-Bahn: S4	Geltendorf–Munich Hauptbahnhof–Ebersberg		406a/428	
999.5	Munich S-Bahn: S5	Herrsching–Munich Hauptbahnhof–Holzkirchen		401a	
999.6	Munich S-Bahn: S6	Tutzing Munich Hauptbahnhof–Kreuzstrasse		429d	
999.7	Munich S-Bahn: S7	Wolfratshausen–Munich Hauptbahnhof–Ostbahnhof		429g	
999.8	Munich S-Bahn: S8 (Munich–Herrsching railway/Munich East–Munich Airport railway)	Herrsching–Munich Hauptbahnhof–Munich Airport			
999.30	Munich S-Bahn: A	Dachau Bf–Altomünster		413b	

== Mountain railways ==
Number (KBS)	Name	Route
11031	Bavarian Zugspitze Railway	Garmisch-Partenkirchen-Grainau–Zugspitze

== Museum railways and park railways ==
Number (KBS)	Name	Route
12248	Chemnitz Park Railway	Chemnitz Küchwald
12249	Dresden Park Railway	Dresden ("Am Strassburger Platz" - "Zoo" - "Carolasse" - "Karcherallee" - "Palaisteich" - "Zoo" - "Am Strassburger Platz")
12250	Syra Valley Park Railway	Plauen
12251	Leipziger Parkeisenbahn	Leipzig
12252	Görlitz Oldtimer Park Railway	Görlitz
12299	Berlin Park Railway	Berlin Oberschöneweide / Karlshorst (Hauptbahnhof der BPE - Berlin Wuhlheide station - Hauptbahnhof BPE)
12377	Minden Museum Railway	Hille–Minden-Oberstadt–Kleinenbremen
12387	Wittlage District Railway	Preussisch Oldendorf–Bad Essen-Bohmte
12388	Minden Museum Railway	Rahden–Uchte
12400	Teutoburg Forest Railway	Ibbenbüren–Bad Laer–Gütersloh Nord–Hövelhof
12424	Schluff	St. Tönis – Crefeld Nord - Hüls - Hülser Berg
12501		Radebeul Ost–Radeburg
12600	Pressnitz Valley Railway	Jöhstadt–Schmalzgrube–Steinbach
12610		Schönheide-Mitte–Stützengrün
12626		Wiesbaden-Dotzheim–Hohenstein (Nass.)
12888	Ilz Valley Railway	Passau–Freyung (currently not open)
12905	Wander Railway in the Regen Valley	Gotteszell–Viechtach

== See also ==
- Rail transport in Germany
- German railway station categories
- Railway station types of Germany
