= Wilhermsdorf station =

Railway station in Germany

Wilhermsdorf
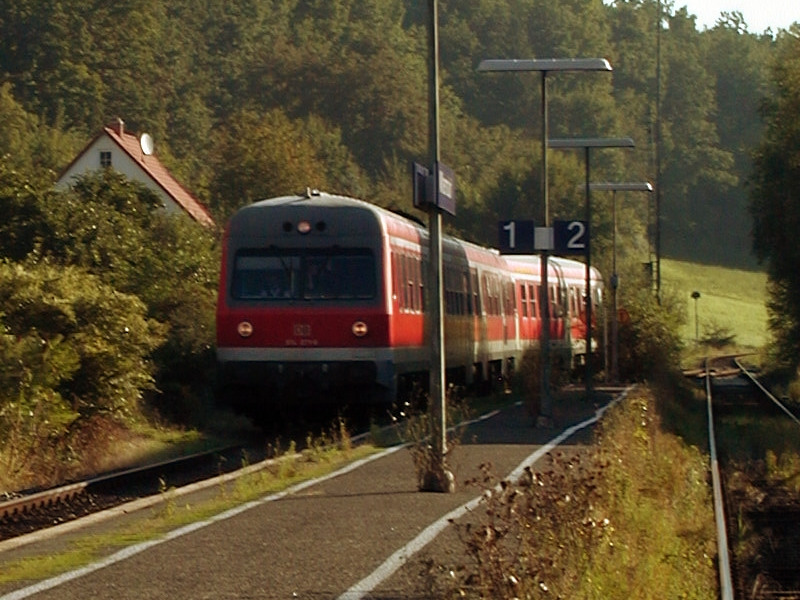
- 2007

General information
- Location: Bahnhofsplatz 1; 91452 Wilhermsdorf; Bavaria; Germany
- Coordinates: 49°29′01″N 10°43′32″E
- System: Bf
- Owner: DB Netz
- Operator: DB Station&Service
- Lines: Zenn Valley Railway (KBS 807)
- Platforms: 1 island platform
- Tracks: 2
- Train operators: DB Regio Bayern

Other information
- Station code: 6775
- DS100 code: NWHD
- IBNR: 8006448
- Category: 6
- Fare zone: VGN: 835 and 826
- Website: www.bahnhof.de

Services
Preceding station	DB Regio Bayern	Following station
Wilhermsdorf Mitte towards Markt Erlbach	RB 12	Laubendorf towards Fürth Hbf
Location
- Location within Bavaria Location within Germany Location within Europe

Wilhermsdorf station is a railway station in the municipality of Wilhermsdorf, located in the district of Fürth in Middle Franconia, Germany.
