= Cadolzburg station =

Railway station in Cadolzburg, Germany

Cadolzburg
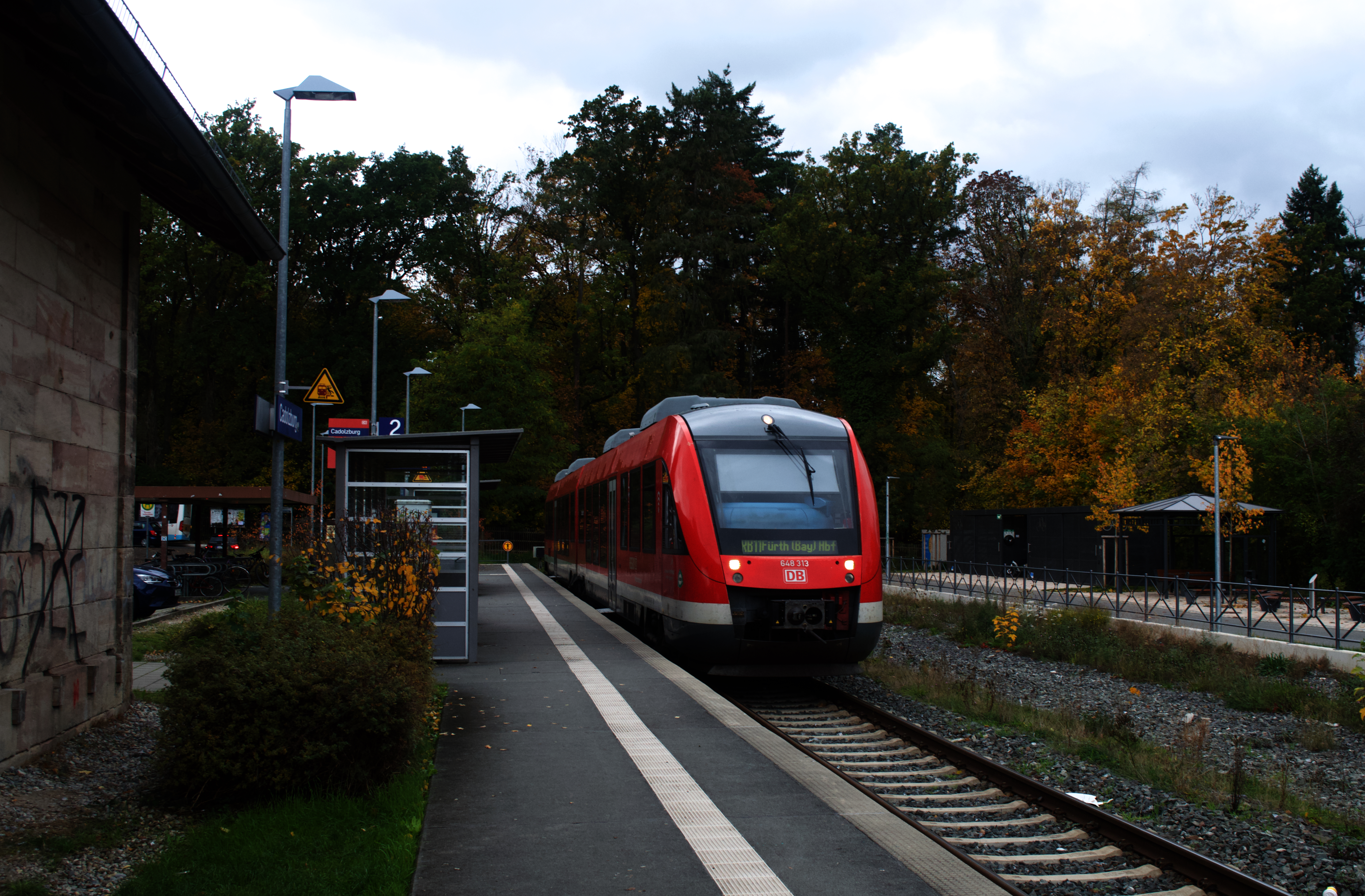
- 2023

General information
- Location: Bahnhofsplatz 1; 90556 Cadolzburg; Bavaria; Germany
- Coordinates: 49.4606°N 10.8635°E
- Elevation: 361 m (1,184 ft)
- System: Bf
- Owner: Deutsche Bahn
- Operator: DB Netz; DB Station&Service
- Lines: Rangau Railway (KBS 808)
- Platforms: 1 side platform
- Tracks: 3
- Train operators: DB Regio Bayern
- Connections: 112 136 152 N21

Construction
- Parking: yes
- Cycle facilities: yes
- Accessible: yes

Other information
- Station code: 1017
- DS100 code: NCA
- IBNR: 8001317
- Category: 6
- Fare zone: VGN: 815
- Website: www.bahnhof.de

Services
Preceding station	DB Regio Bayern	Following station
Terminus	RB 11	Egersdorf towards Fürth Hbf
Location
- Location within Bavaria Location within Germany Location within Europe

Cadolzburg station is a railway station in the municipality of Cadolzburg, located in the Fürth district in Bavaria, Germany.
