= Markt Erlbach station =

Railway station in Germany

Markt Erlbach
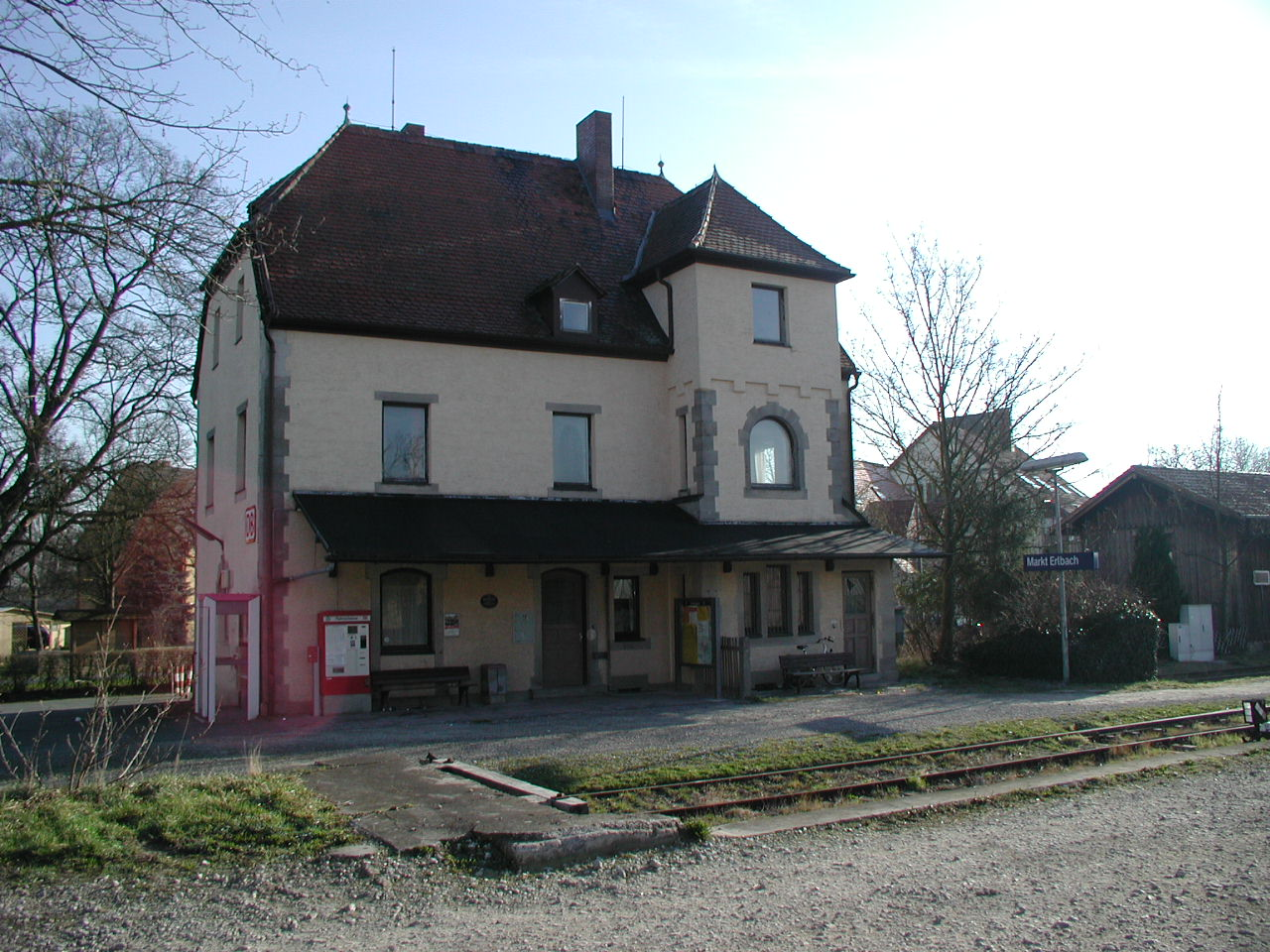
- 2007

General information
- Location: Nürnberger Straße 14; 91459 Markt Erlbach; Bavaria; Germany
- Coordinates: 49°29′32″N 10°39′33″E
- Owner: Deutsche Bahn
- Operator: DB Netz; DB Station&Service
- Lines: Zenn Valley Railway (KBS 807)
- Platforms: 1 island platform
- Tracks: 2
- Train operators: DB Regio Bayern
- Connections: 129

Other information
- Station code: 3970
- DS100 code: NMER
- IBNR: 8003878
- Category: 6
- Fare zone: VGN: 827 and 851
- Website: www.bahnhof.de

Services
Preceding station	DB Regio Bayern	Following station
Terminus	RB 12	Eschenbach (b Markt Erlbach) towards Fürth Hbf
Location
- Location within Bavaria Location within Germany Location within Europe

Markt Erlbach station is a railway station in the municipality of Markt Erlbach, located in the district of Neustadt (Aisch)-Bad Windsheim in Middle Franconia, Germany.
