= Jakobinenstraße station =

Metro station in Fürth, Germany

Jakobinenstraße
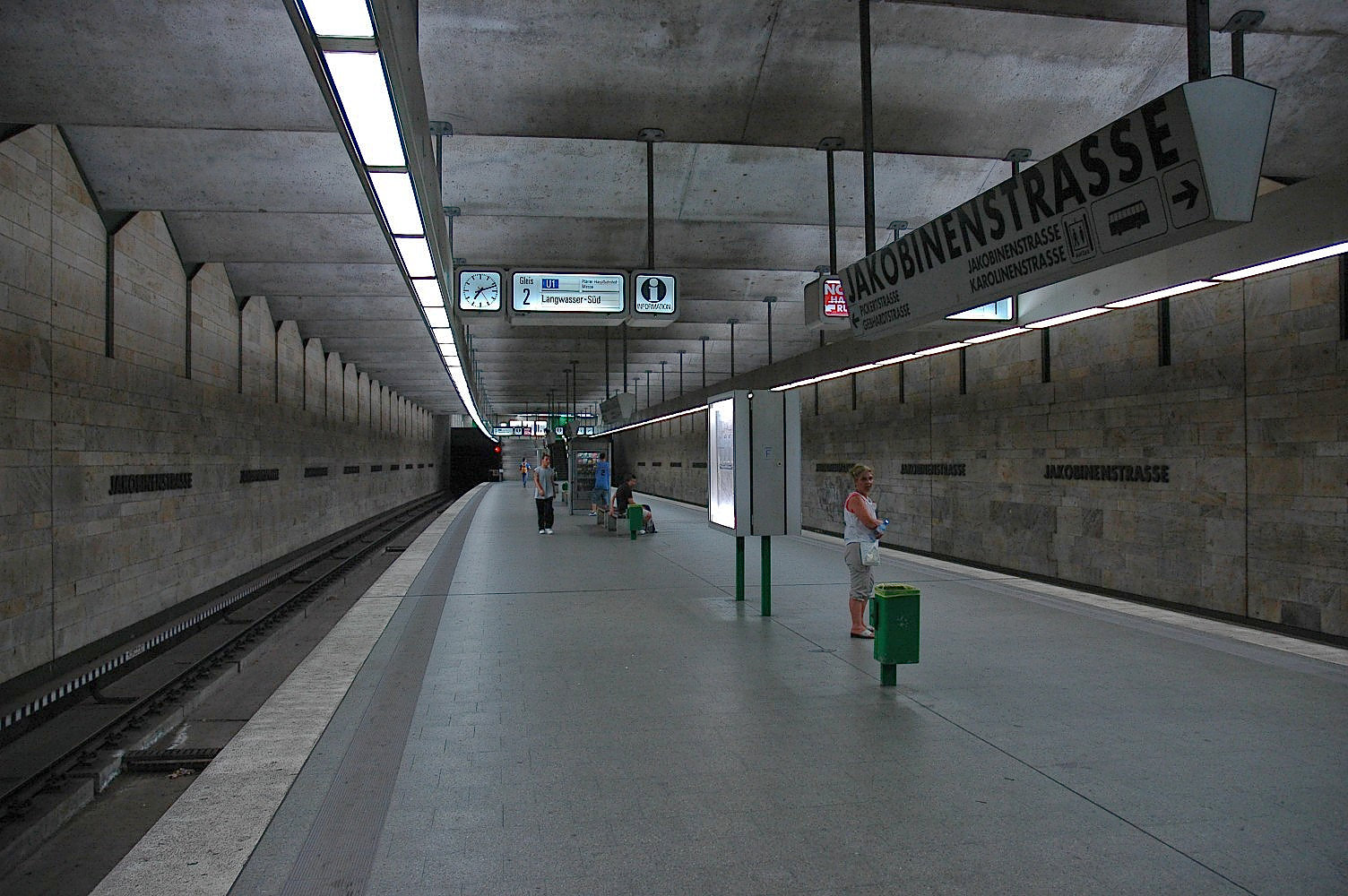

General information
- Location: Gebhardtstraße; 90762 Fürth, Germany
- Coordinates: 49.4683033°N 11.0005601°E
- System: Nuremberg U-Bahn station
- Operator: Verkehrs-Aktiengesellschaft Nürnberg
- Connections: Bus: 111 Fürth - Zirndorf - Cadolzburg; 112 Fürth - Zirndorf - Roßtal; 173 Jakobinenstraße - Atzenhof; 174 Jakobinenstraße - Vach

Construction
- Structure type: Underground

Other information
- Fare zone: VGN: 200

History
- Opened: 20 March 1982

Services
Preceding station	Nuremberg U-Bahn	Following station
Fürth Hbf towards Fürth Hardhöhe	U1	Stadtgrenze towards Langwasser Süd
Location

Jakobinenstraße station is a Nuremberg U-Bahn station, located on the U1 in Fürth.
