= Fürth Hauptbahnhof =

Railway station in Fürth, Germany

Fürth (Bayern) Hbf
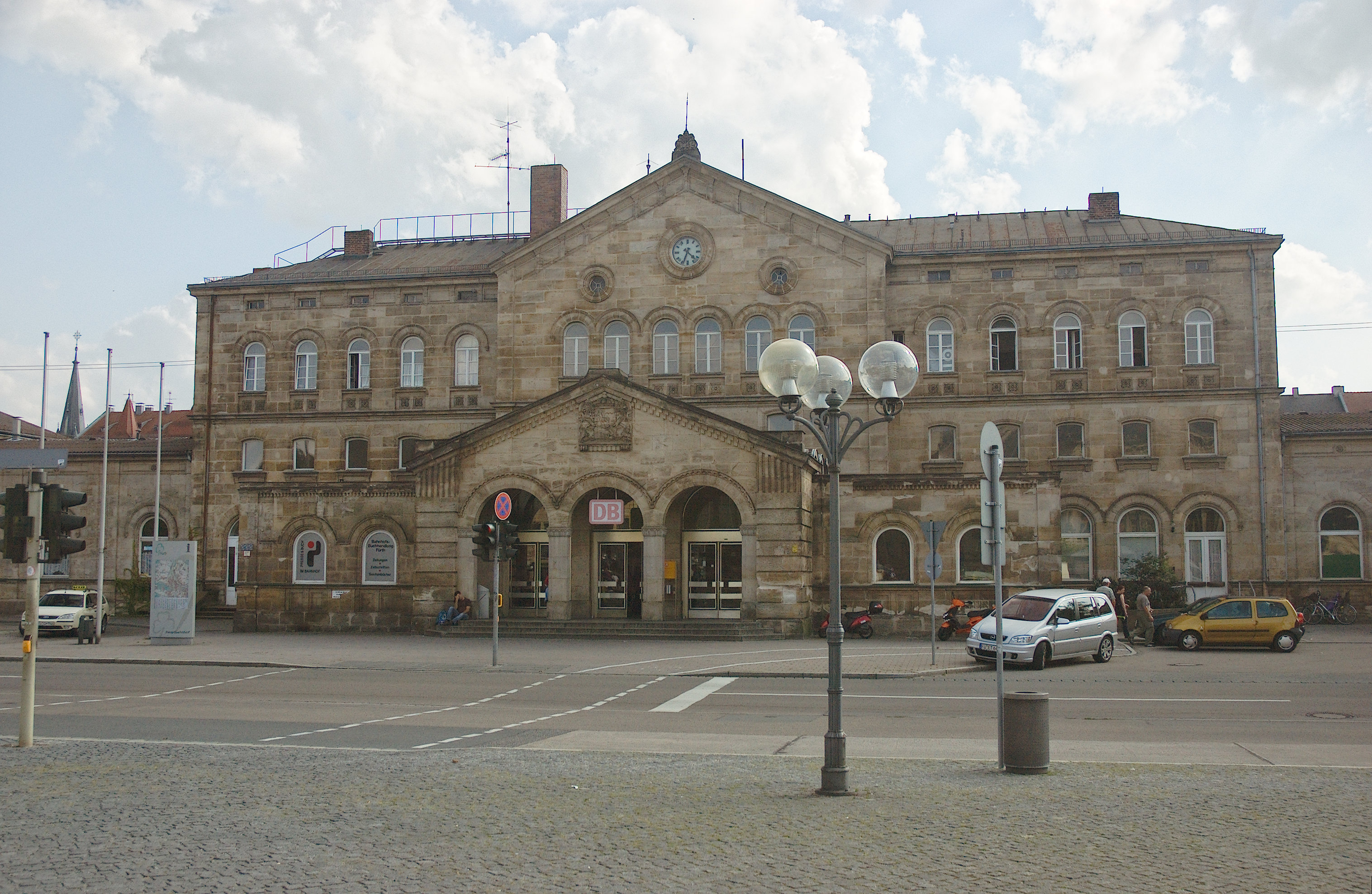
- Station building viewed from the station forecourt

General information
- Location: Fürth, Bavaria; Germany
- Coordinates: 49°28′12″N 10°59′25″E
- Lines: Nuremberg–Würzburg (KBS 805, 891.1, 900); Zenngrundbahn (KBS 891.1); Rangaubahn (KBS 808); Nuremberg–Bamberg (KBS 805, 820, 891.1, 891.2, 900); Nuremberg ring railway
- Platforms: 8
- Connections: Bus: 67 Frankenstraße - Fürth Hbf; 111 Fürth - Zirndorf - Cadolzburg; 112 Fürth - Zirndorf - Roßtal; 152 Kirchfarrnbach - Fürth; 172 Fürth Hbf - Burgfarrnbach; 173 Jakobinenstraße - Atzenhof; 174 Jakobinenstraße - Vach; 177 Europaallee - Rudolf-Schiestl-Str.; 178 Weiherhof - Schmalau; 179 Fürth Süd bzw. Europaallee - Großgründlach

Construction
- Architect: Eduard Rüber

Other information
- Station code: 1984
- DS100 code: NF
- Category: 2
- Fare zone: VGN: 200
- Website: www.bahnhof.de

History
- Opened: 19 June 1865; 161 years ago
- Electrified: 26 August 1939; 86 years ago

Services
| Preceding station | DB Fernverkehr | Following station |
|---|---|---|
| Erlangen towards Rostock Hbf | IC 17 | Nürnberg Hbf towards Dresden Hbf or Chemnitz Hbf |
| Preceding station | DB Regio Bayern | Following station |
| Siegelsdorf towards Würzburg Hbf | RE 10 | Nürnberg Hbf Terminus |
| Erlangen towards Saalfeld (Saale) | RE 14 | Nürnberg Hbf Terminus |
| Erlangen towards Sonneberg (Thür) Hbf | RE 19 | Nürnberg Hbf Terminus |
| Erlangen towards Würzburg Hbf | RE 20 | Nürnberg Hbf Terminus |
| Erlangen towards Sonneberg (Thür) Hbf | RE 28 | Nürnberg Hbf Terminus |
| Erlangen towards Erfurt Hbf | RE 29 | Nürnberg Hbf Terminus |
| Fürth Westvorstadt towards Cadolzburg | RB 11 | Terminus |
| Fürth-Unterfürberg towards Markt Erlbach | RB 12 | Terminus |
| Preceding station | Nuremberg S-Bahn | Following station |
| Fürth-Klinikum towards Bamberg | S1 | Nürnberg Rothenburgerstraße towards Neumarkt (Oberpfalz) |
| Fürth-Unterfürberg towards Neustadt (Aisch) | S6 | Nürnberg Hbf Terminus |
| Preceding station | Nuremberg U-Bahn | Following station |
| Fürth Rathaus towards Fürth Hardhöhe | U1 | Jakobinenstraße towards Langwasser Süd |
Location

Fürth (Bayern) Hauptbahnhof is a railway hub for the city of Fürth in Bavaria, Germany. The station is mainly frequented by regional services. It also has a connection to the Nuremberg U-Bahn (underground) system and the Nuremberg S-Bahn (commuter) network.

== Long-distance services ==
Until the timetable change in 2003, the station was a stop for Intercity (IC) trains that linked Nuremberg Hauptbahnhof via Fürth to Würzburg Hauptbahnhof and Frankfurt am Main. Today the only long-distance train calling at Fürth Hauptbahnhof is the CityNightLine Pluto which runs from Munich to Berlin.

== Regional services ==
Regional services heading eastwards run through the neighbouring city of Nuremberg and onwards towards Neumarkt (Oberpfalz)–Regensburg Hauptbahnhof–Munich Hauptbahnhof or Treuchtlingen–Munich Hauptbahnhof.

Around a kilometre to the west of the station the route divides and runs in three different directions.

One line, the Nuremberg–Bamberg railway (timetable route (KBS) 820), branches off to the north, towards the city of Bamberg. A second line heads west on the Nuremberg–Würzburg line (KBS 805), from which the Zenngrundbahn (KBS 891.1) to Markt Erlbach branches off at Siegelsdorf; and a third railway, the Rangaubahn (KBS 808), swings towards the southwest and heads for the town of Cadolzburg. Services on the Cadolzburg route run every 30 minutes; the line to Markt Erlbach has an hourly service.

== Links to urban transport services ==
Since 7 December 1985, the 150th anniversary of the German railways, Fürth Hauptbahnhof has been joined to the U1 line of the Nuremberg U-Bahn network. At the beginning of 2006, construction work started on a project to connect Fürth to the Nuremberg S-Bahn as well; the S-Bahn line opened in Fürth in 2010. The station forecourt is one of the most important bus service hubs for the area. A total of seven out of the eleven bus lines operated by Stadtbus Fürth, the city bus company, begin or stop at Fürth Hauptbahnhof, which is why an electronic timetable display system has been installed here. In addition there is car parking for private cars as well as taxi stands on the station forecourt.

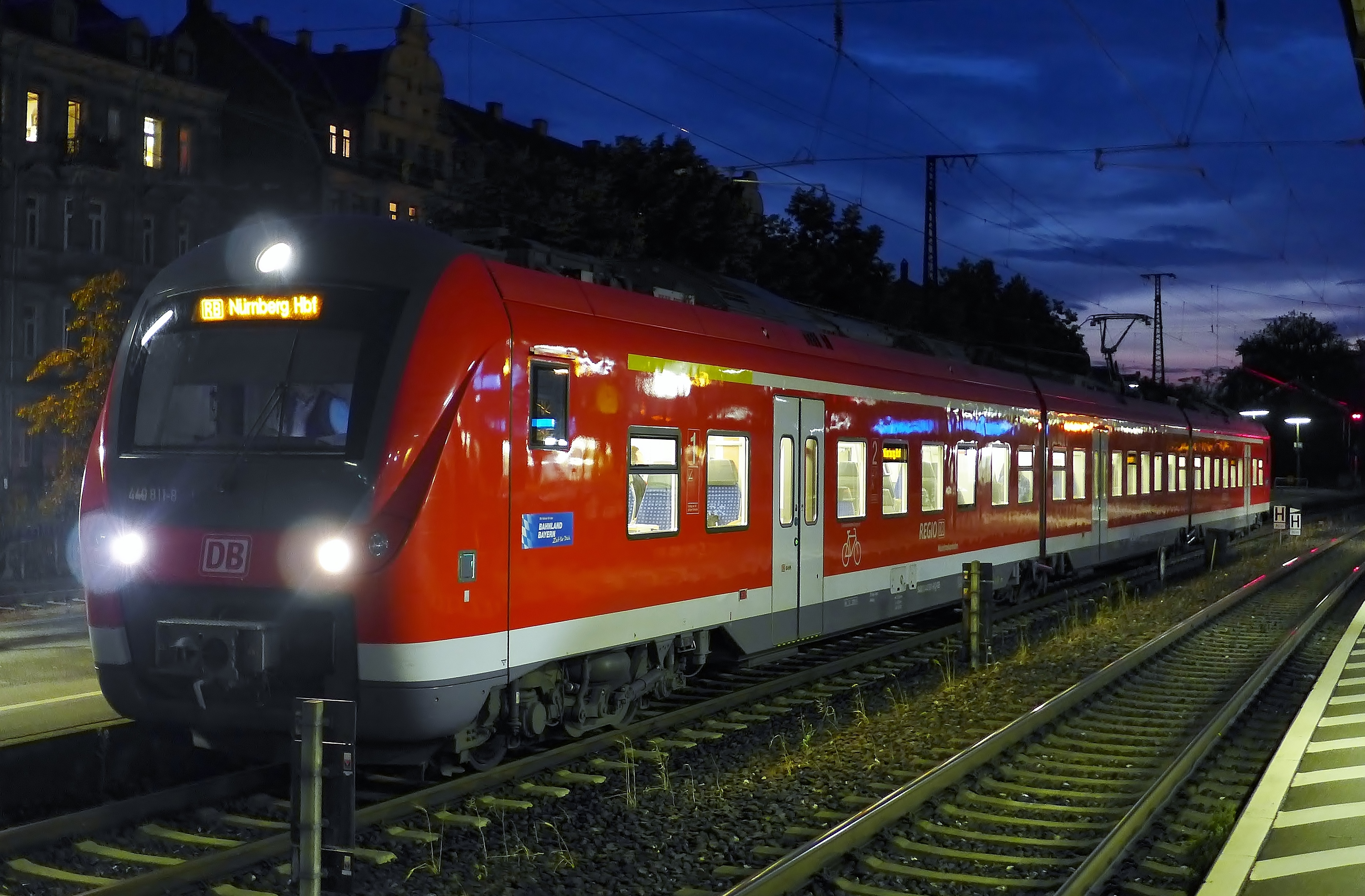
A DBAG Class 440 train on a regional service to Nürnberg Hbf

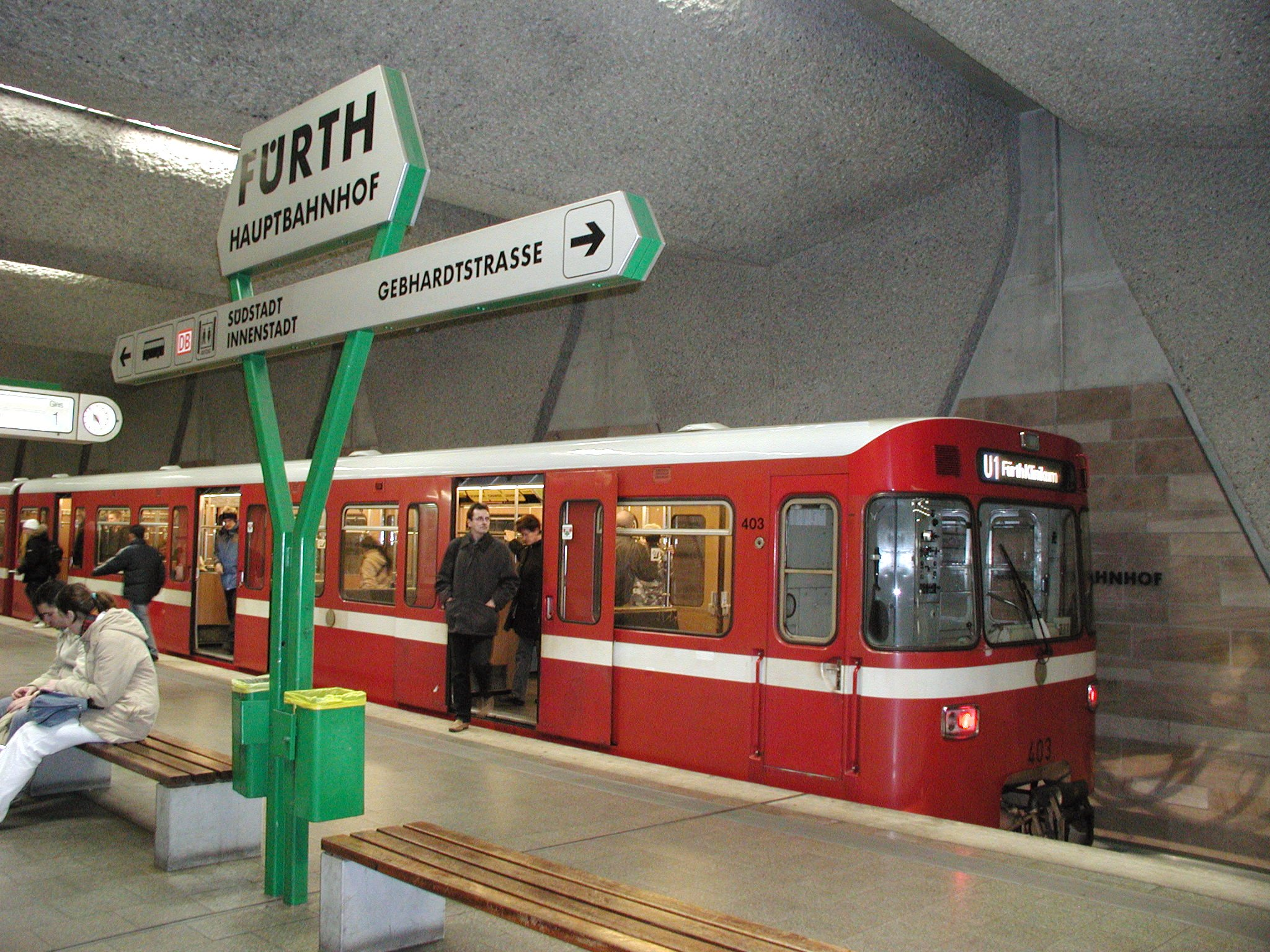
U-Bahn station at Fürth Hauptbahnhof

== History ==
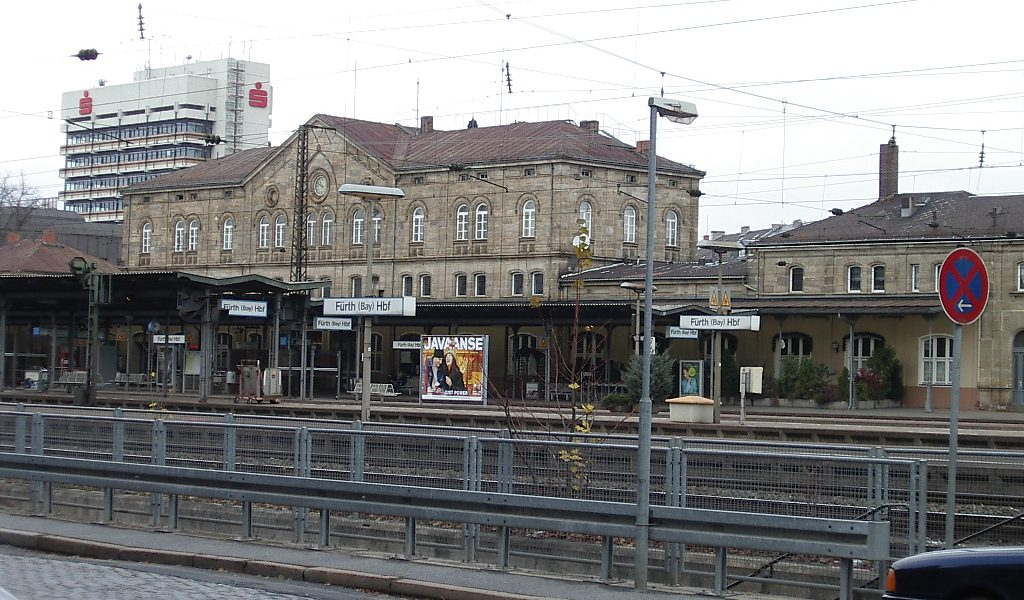
Fürth Hauptbahnhof

The first station at Fürth was a good hundred metres further north, on Fürth's Freiheit square. This so-called Ludwig's station emerged as the Fürth end of the Bavarian Ludwigsbahn opened on 7 December 1835 between Nuremberg and Fürth, and which was one of the first railway lines in Germany. In 1922 the Ludwigsbahn was closed and the tracks used by the Nuremüberg-Fürth tramway until 1981; its course is however still clearly visible on the present-day Rudolf-Breitscheid-Strasse. The old station was knocked down in 1938 when the Nazi Party needed a parade ground on the Schlageterplatz, known today as the Fürther Freiheit.

With the building of the link between Fürth and Rottendorf and the routing of the Ludwig South-North Railway over the Fürther Bogen a new station building was needed. The task was given to the architect, Eduard Rüber. In 1863/1864 a rectangular building with a wide, central Risalit appeared on the northern side of the new railway line at Bahnhofsplatz 9. Along the long sides of the two-storey station building were a number of coupled, double windows. The tracks were covered with cast iron roofing, some of which remain today.

Today this through station has nine tracks (one of which is a passing loop for goods trains) and seven platforms with lengths between 348 and 421 metres. In the 1970s the Bahnhofs-Center appeared immediately next to the station building at the point where Gebhardtstrasse enters the station square. The underpass beneath the tracks was extended as far as Karolinenstrasse during the building of the U-Bahn and offers a direct connexion from the south of Fürth to the city centre using the railway and U-Bahn.

As part of the expansion of the section of line between Nuremberg and Fürth an electronic signal box was built at Hauptbahnhof Fürth. When it is completely ready in 2011 it will be able to control, not just the station, but the line to Nuremberg with its total of 87 home signals and 94 axle counters.

== Operational usage ==
In brief
| DB station code: | NF |
