= Wernshausen =

- Village of Schmalkalden
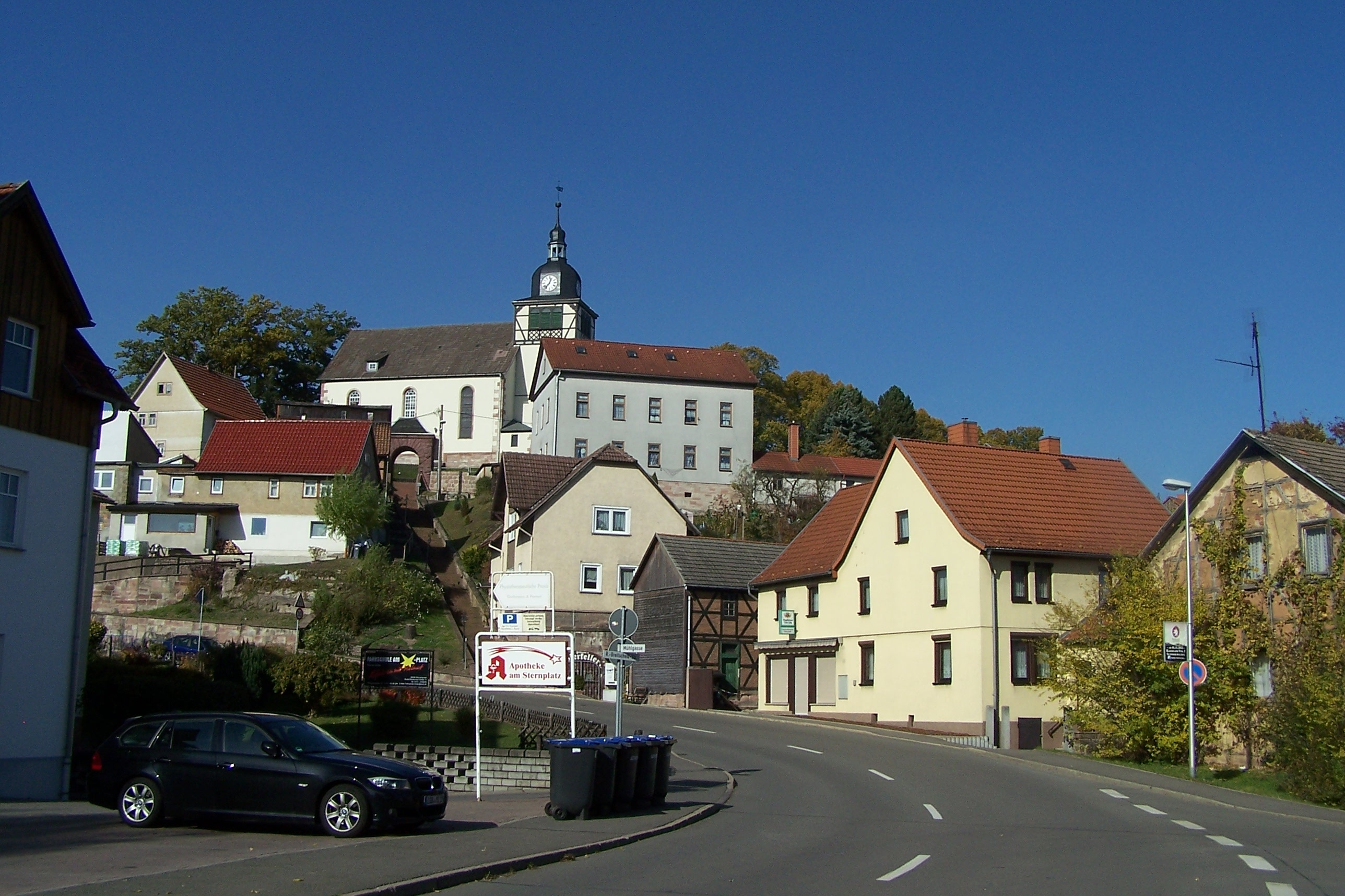
- Wernshausen

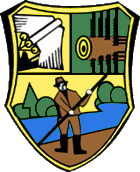
- Coat of arms
- Interactive map of Wernshausen
- Location within Germany Location within Thuringia
- Coordinates: 50°43′N 10°21′E
- Country: Germany
- State: Thuringia
- District: Schmalkalden-Meiningen
- Town: Schmalkalden

Area
  - Total: 26.29 km^{2} (10.15 sq mi)
- Elevation: 257 m (843 ft)

Population (2006-12-31)
  - Total: 3,073
  - Density: 116.9/km^{2} (302.7/sq mi)
- Time zone: UTC+01:00 (CET)
  - Summer (DST): UTC+02:00 (CEST)
- Postal codes: 98590
- Dialling codes: 036848
- Website: wernshausen.de

Wernshausen is a part of Schmalkalden in the district Schmalkalden-Meiningen, in Thuringia, Germany. Until December 2008, when it was merged into Schmalkalden, it was an independent municipality.
