= Neunkirchen am Sand =

Neunkirchen a.Sand
- Municipality
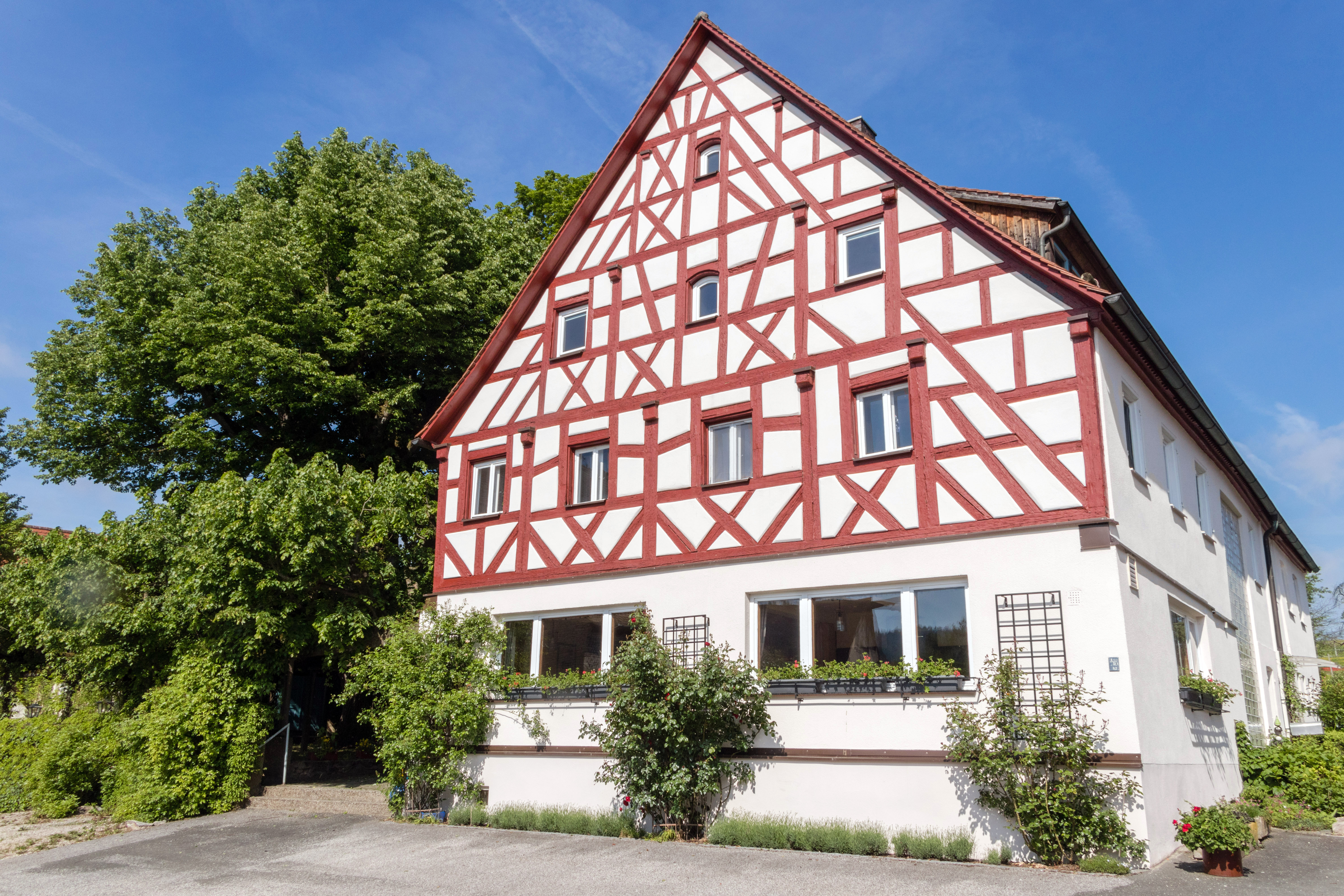
- Timber-framed inn and a protected linden tree in Kersbach

- Coat of arms

- Location of Neunkirchen a.Sand within Nürnberger Land district
- Interactive map of Neunkirchen a.Sand
- Location within Germany Location within Bavaria
- Coordinates: 49°31′N 11°19′E
- Country: Germany
- State: Bavaria
- Admin. region: Mittelfranken
- District: Nürnberger Land
- Subdivisions: 7 Gemeindeteile

Government
  - Mayor (2020–26): Jens Fankhänel (CSU)

Area
  - Total: 14.13 km^{2} (5.46 sq mi)
- Elevation: 331 m (1,086 ft)

Population (2025-12-31)
  - Total: 4,506
  - Density: 318.9/km^{2} (825.9/sq mi)
- Time zone: UTC+01:00 (CET)
  - Summer (DST): UTC+02:00 (CEST)
- Postal codes: 91233
- Dialling codes: 09123, 09153 (outlying parts)
- Vehicle registration: LAU, ESB, HEB, N, PEG
- Website: www.neunkirchen-am-sand.de

Neunkirchen am Sand (German pronunciation: [ˈnɔʏnkɪʁçn̩ ʔam ˈzant]) is a municipality in the district of Nürnberger Land in Bavaria in Germany.
