= Fürth–Cadolzburg railway =

Railway line Germany

Fürth (Bayern)–Cadolzburg
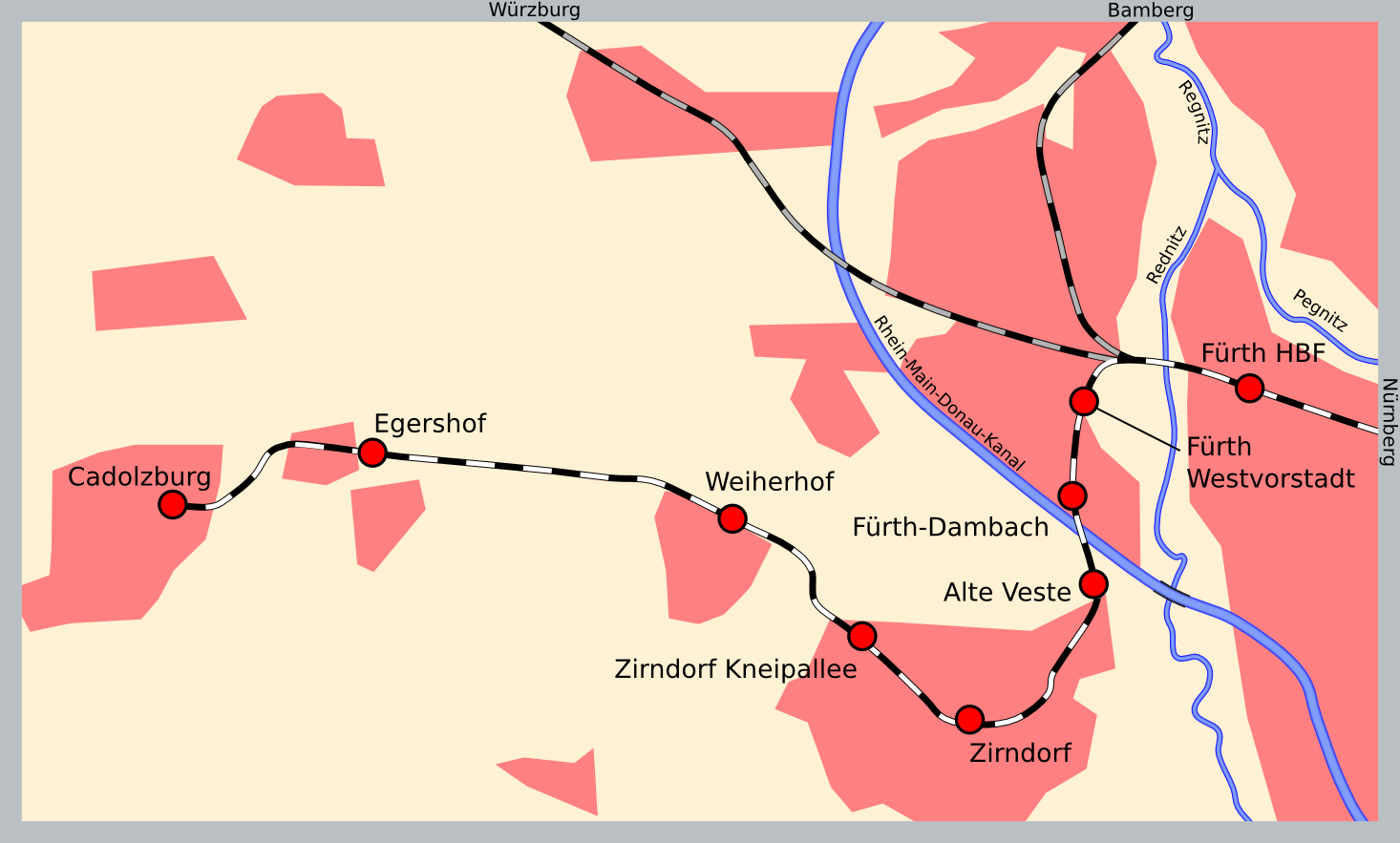

Overview
- Line number: 5911

Service
- Route number: 808

Technical
- Line length: 12.9 km
- Track gauge: 1,435 mm

The Rangau Railway (German: Rangaubahn) is the railway line from Fürth via Zirndorf to Cadolzburg. In the local dialect it used to be known as the Cadolzburger Moggerla ("Moggerla" is East Franconian for "calf").
