= Siegelsdorf–Markt Erlbach railway =

Railway line Germany

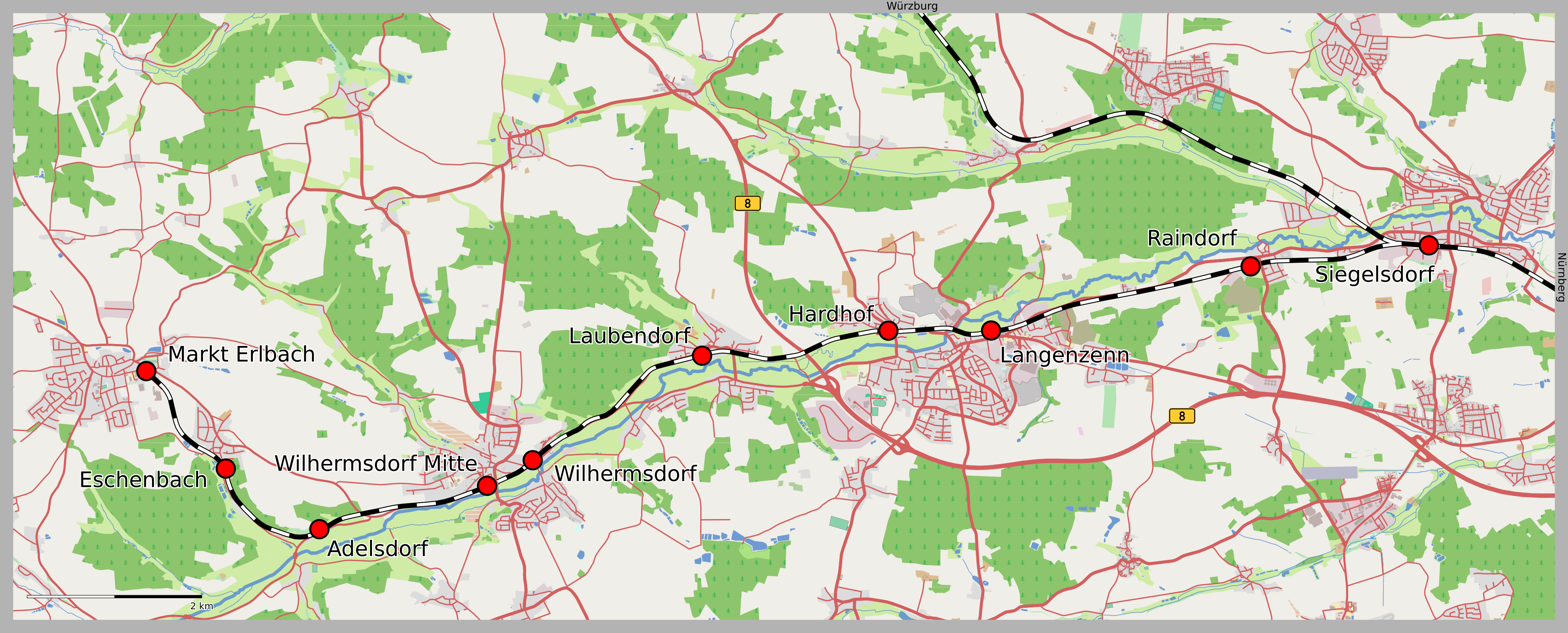

Overview
- Native name: Zenngrundbahn
- Line number: 5913
- Locale: Bavaria, Germany

Service
- Route number: 807

Technical
- Line length: 17.7 km (11.0 mi)
- Track gauge: 1,435 mm (4 ft 8 1/2 in) standard gauge

The Zenn Valley Railway (German: Zenngrundbahn) is a branch line in the German free state of Bavaria that branches at Siegelsdorf off the Nuremberg–Würzburg railway and runs to Markt Erlbach. It is single-tracked, with a crossing loop in Wilhermsdorf station, and non-electrified. All trains run from and to Fürth Hauptbahnhof. The Zenn Valley Railway was the first Vizinalbahn ("neighbourhood railway") in Bavaria and was especially important to the town of Langenzenn due to the brickworks there. The line opened in stages between 1872 and 1902.
