= Ulm-Söflingen station =

Railway station in Ulm, Germany

Ulm-Söflingen
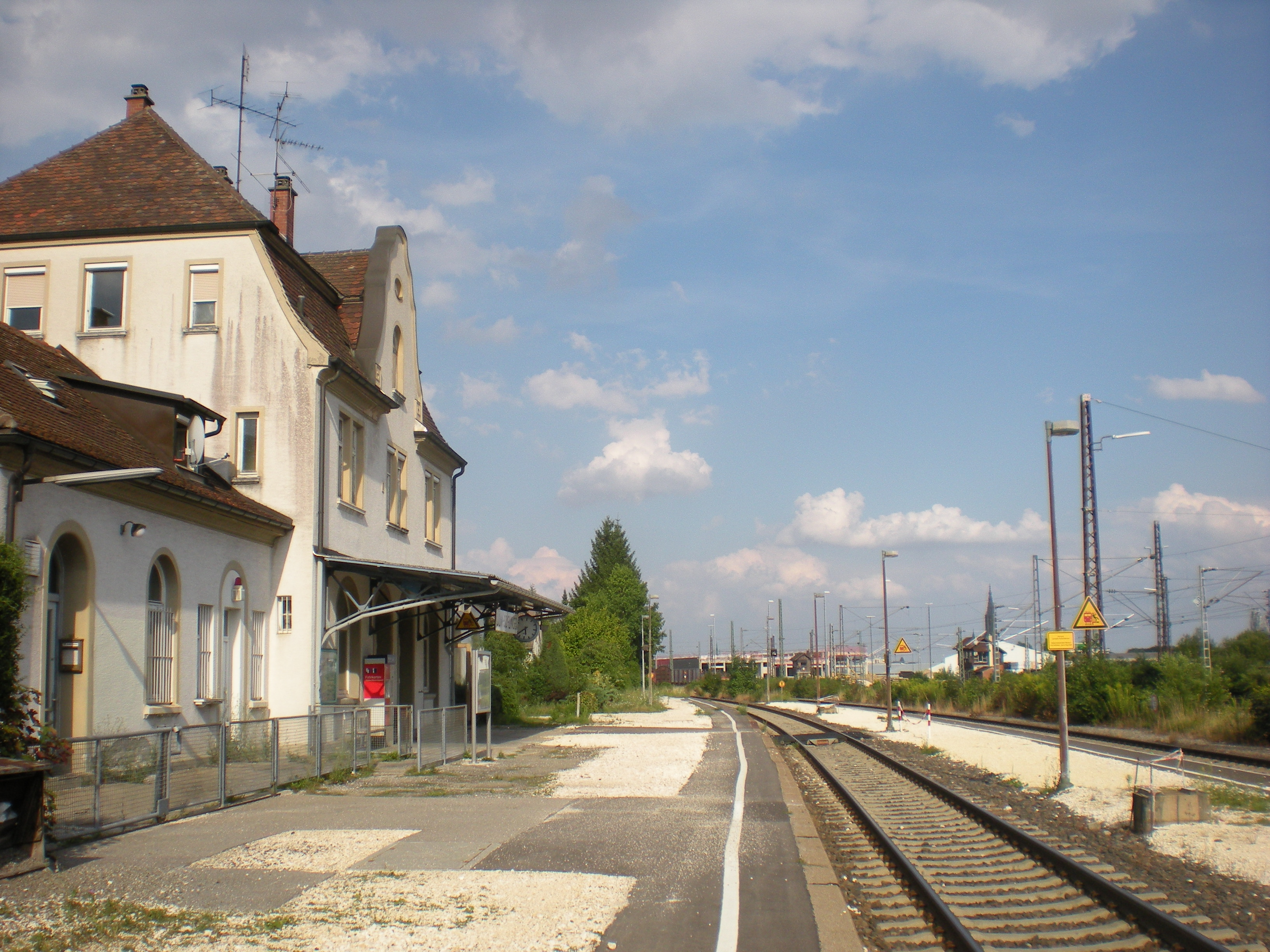
- 2012

General information
- Location: In der Wanne 1; 89075 Ulm; Baden-Württemberg; Germany
- Coordinates: 48.4029°N 9.9588°E
- Elevation: 484 m (1,588 ft)
- System: Bft
- Owner: Deutsche Bahn
- Operator: DB Station&Service
- Lines: Ulm–Sigmaringen railway (KBS 755) (KBS 756)
- Platforms: 2 side platforms
- Tracks: 2
- Train operators: Hohenzollerische Landesbahn
- Connections: RS 3

Construction
- Parking: yes
- Cycle facilities: no
- Accessible: partly

Other information
- Station code: 6325
- DS100 code: TU F
- IBNR: 8005955
- Category: 6
- Fare zone: DING: 10
- Website: www.bahnhof.de

Services
Preceding station	(Offenburg)	Following station
Blaustein towards Munderkingen	RS 3	Ulm Hbf Terminus
Location
- Location within Baden-Württemberg Location within Germany Location within Europe

Ulm-Söflingen station is a railway station in the Söflingen district in the town of Ulm, located in Baden-Württemberg, Germany. It dates back to the 20th century and is currently listed as a protected historical building in Germany.
