= Tuttlingen–Inzigkofen railway =

Railway line in Baden-Württemberg, Germany

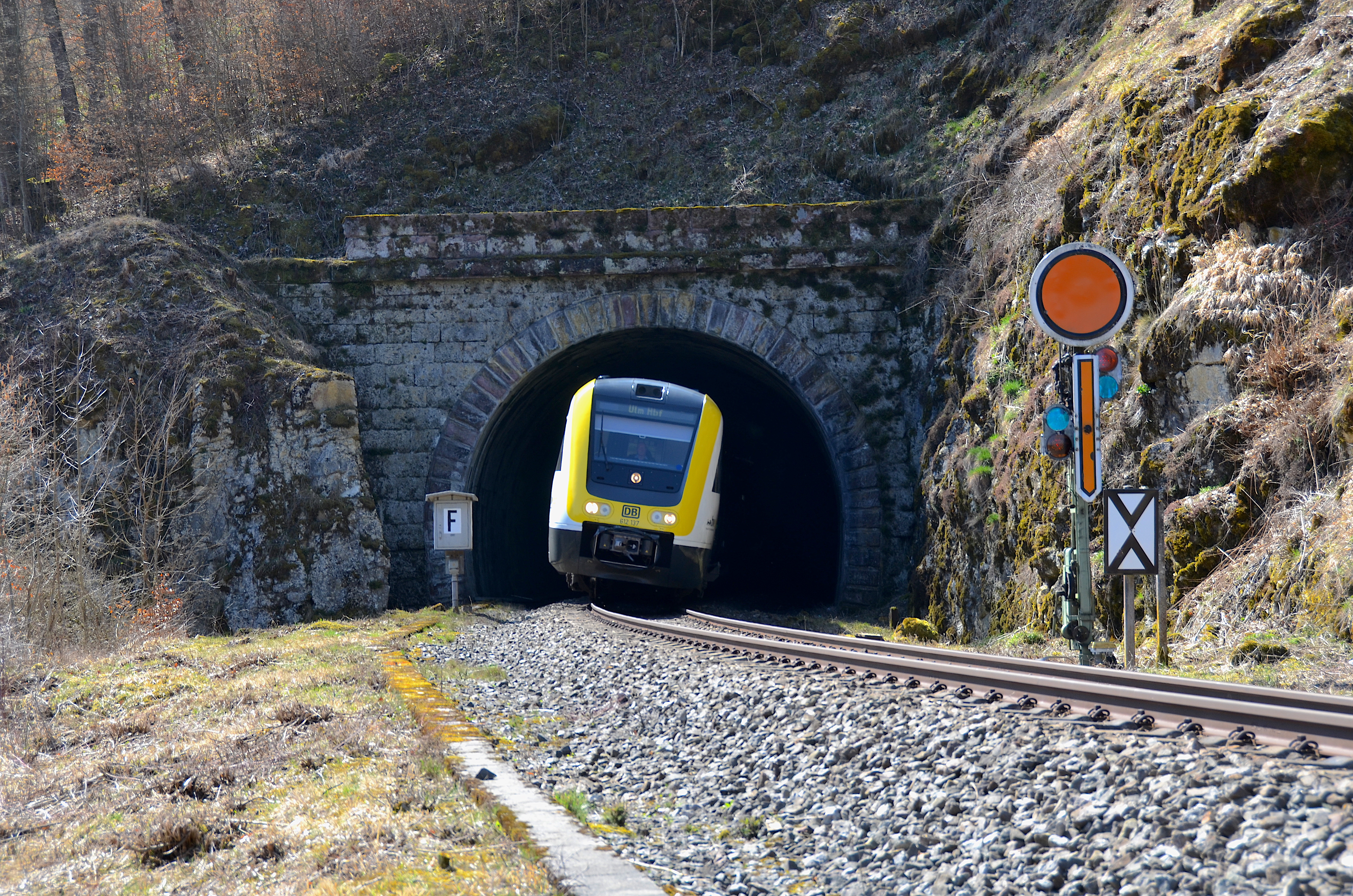
- Train at the Schanz tunnel, running to Beuron. On the right is a mechanical signal controlling entry to Fridingen station

Overview
- Status: Operational
- Owner: Deutsche Bahn
- Line number: 4660
- Locale: Baden-Württemberg
- Termini: Tuttlingen; Inzigkofen

Service
- Route number: 743 (Rottweil/Sigmaringen–Waldshut); 755 (Donaueschingen–Ulm)

History
- Opened: 1890

Technical
- Line length: 37.08 km (23.04 mi)
- Number of tracks: Single track
- Track gauge: 1,435 mm (4 ft 8 1/2 in) standard gauge

The Tuttlingen–Inzigkofen railway is a single-track and non-electrified 37.08 km-long railway in southern Baden-Württemberg, Germany. The line connects Tuttlingen station with the Tübingen–Sigmaringen railway at Inzigkofen junction, which was once the site of Inzigkofen station. The line runs over its entire length along the headwaters of the Danube and it is therefore considered by Deutsche Bahn to form part of the Donaubahn (Danube Valley Railway) from Donaueschingen to Ulm.

The Royal Württemberg State Railways (Königlich Württembergische Staats-Eisenbahnen) and the Grand Duchy of Baden State Railway (Badische Staatseisenbahnen) opened the Tuttlingen–Inzigkofen line in 1890 under pressure from the German General Staff as part of a strategic railway to bypass Switzerland. The military considered the line, along with three other strategic lines in southern Baden, necessary in preparation for another war with France. Since 1901 it has formed part of a national rail link, with the Höllentalbahn and the Ulm–Sigmaringen railway, between Freiburg im Breisgau and Ulm.

The bridges, signal boxes, embankments, gate-keepers; houses, tunnels and stations that were built according to the Baden or Württemberg design "philosophies" are now heritage-listed, but the track infrastructure is not protected.

== Course ==
The Tuttlingen–Inzigkofen railway spans two rural districts and is integrated in two transport associations. Between Tuttlingen and Fridingen it runs through the district of Tuttlingen and the territory of its transport association, TUTicket, while from Beuron it runs through the district of Sigmaringen and is integrated into the Neckar-Alb-Donau Transport Association (NALDO).

The connection is particularly known for its attractive location in the Upper Danube Nature Park and on the southern edge of the Swabian Jura, and is considered one of the most scenic railway routes in Germany. It is particularly popular with cycle tourists; the Danube Cycle Path from Donaueschingen to Vienna follows most of the line.

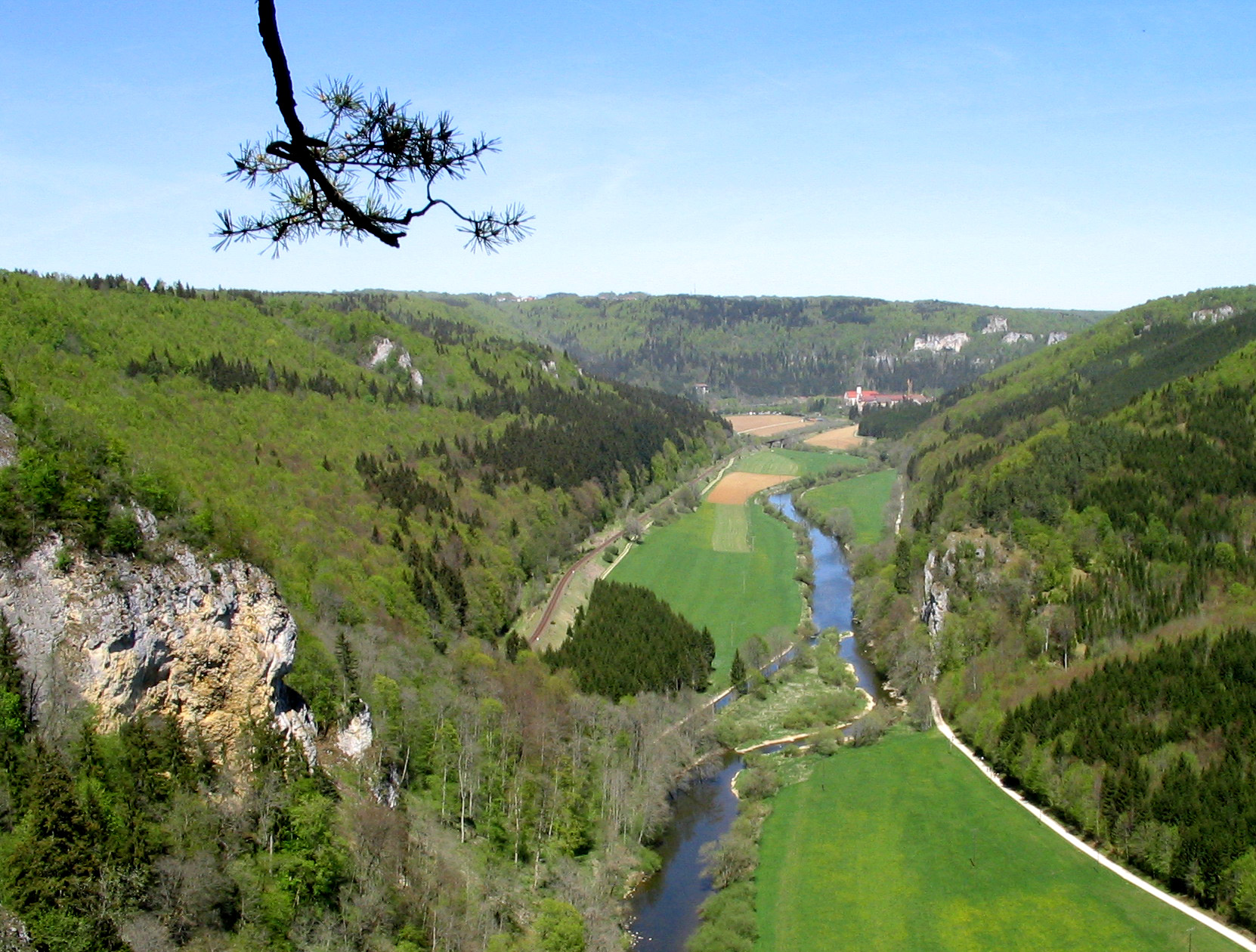
The line seen from the Knopfmacherfelsen lookout

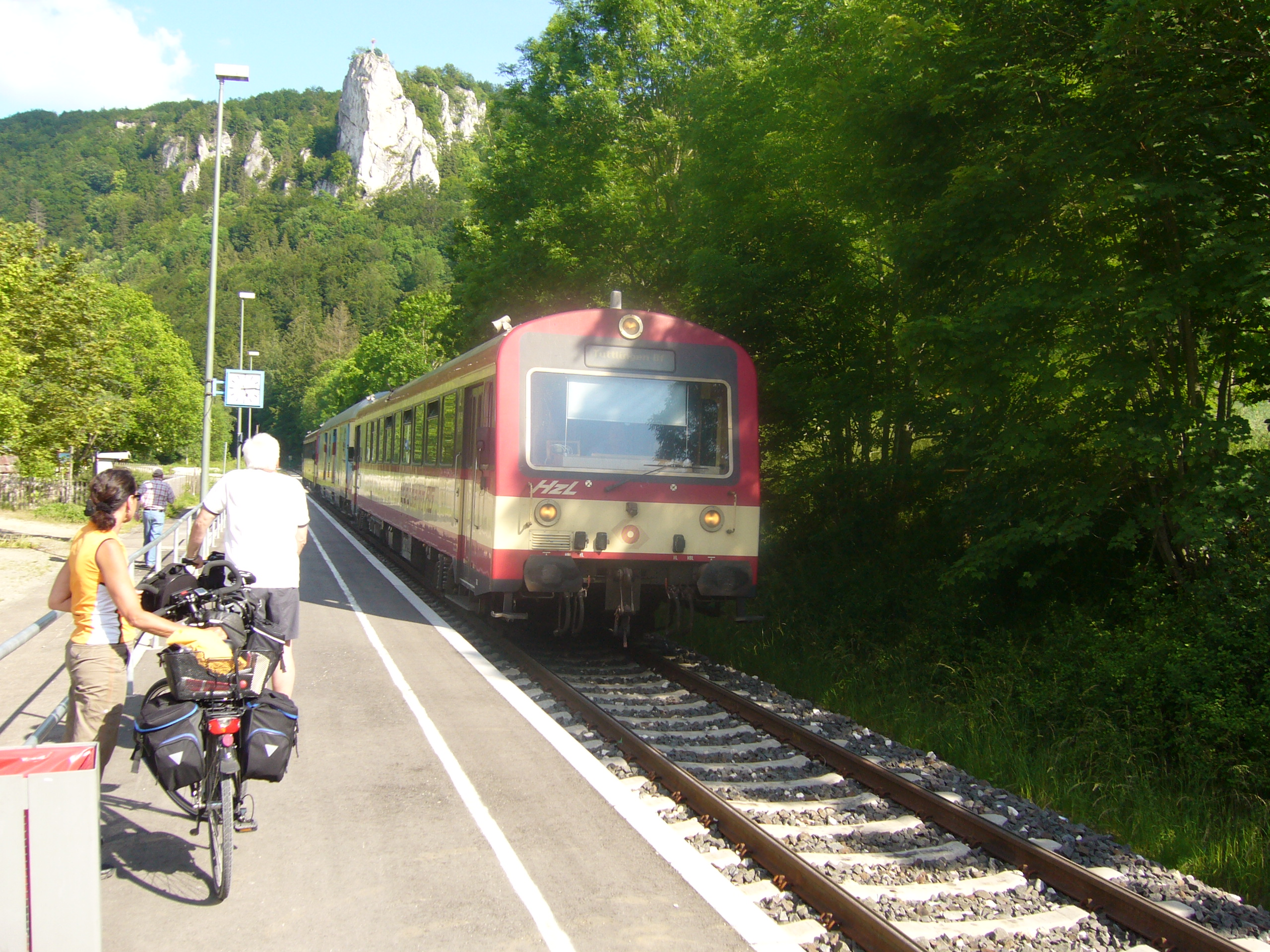
Beuron station

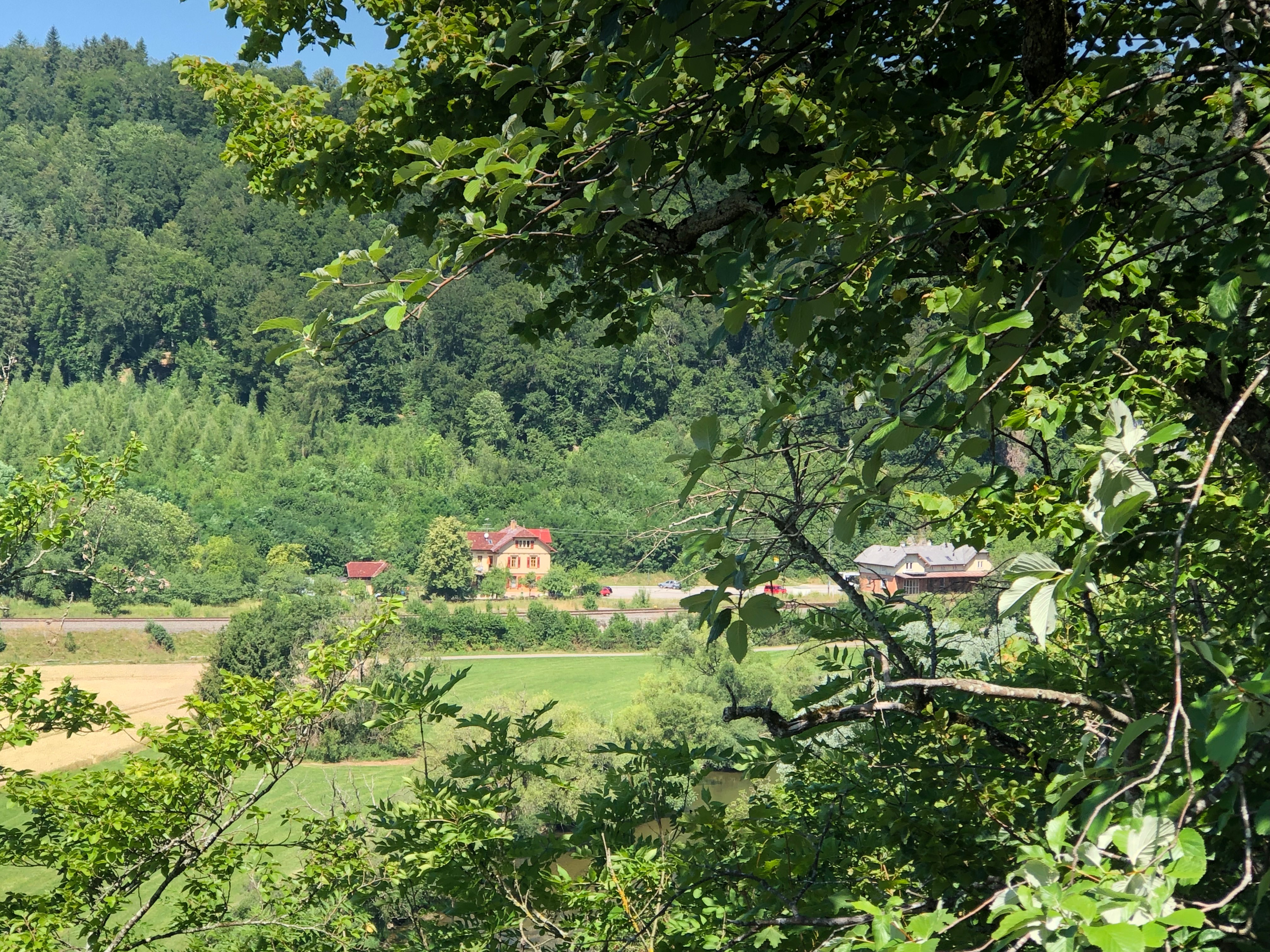
Inzigkofen station seen from Känzele lookout in Fürstlicher Park Inzigkofen.

== National significance ==
The Tuttlingen–Inzigkofen railway forms part of the shortest rail link between the two cities of Ulm and Freiburg in Baden-Württemberg. It is therefore part of connections from Augsburg and Munich to Freiburg and from Ulm via Tuttlingen to Switzerland. Nevertheless, it is not now an important east–west connection. This is due to the low average speed due to its single track and the train crossings required as a result. So connections from Munich and Ulm to Freiburg are now much faster via Stuttgart and Karlsruhe. This has reduced the national character of the line. To make matters worse, the Kleber-Express, which had connected Freiburg and Munich since 1954 and had used the entire line from Tuttlingen to Inzigkofen, was discontinued by Deutsche Bahn in 2003.

== History ==
=== Border problems and initial promotion of the construction of a railway ===
The situation between the then independent countries of Württemberg and Baden and the Province of Hohenzollern, which had belonged to Prussia since 1850, hampered the construction of the line, which repeatedly crosses the borders of that time. It was built by the Royal Württemberg State Railways, extending the Black Forest Railway from Offenburg to Singen, which had previously been built by the Baden State Railways. Prussia did not take part in the construction of the line, although some of it ran through Hohenzollern territory.

The first considerations for the construction of a railway line from Ulm up the Danube emerged in the 1850s. As in many places, railway committees were founded in the cities and towns along the Danube to promote the construction of such a line. In 1861, 17 of these railway committees went public with a memorandum that supported an east–west connection from Ulm via Ehingen, Mengen, Meßkirch and Singen to Schaffhausen in Switzerland with a connection to Tuttlingen and to the Black Forest Railway, which was still in the planning phase. At this time, the construction of a railway line along the Danube as part of a European main line from Vienna to Paris was discussed. Since a railway line from Ulm to Vienna already existed at the beginning of the 1860s and Paris was already connected to Chaumont in the east, a line was discussed as the shortest connection between Paris and Vienna that would have closed the gap by running from Ulm along the Danube to Donaueschingen and continuing through the Black Forest to Freiburg im Breisgau, over the Rhine and the Vosges to Chaumont. This was especially promoted by the towns along the Danube. In addition to the considerable topographical problems that would have affected the construction of such a railway with the means available at the time, there was also the problems created by the many national borders that would have been crossed.

=== Construction under military pressure ===
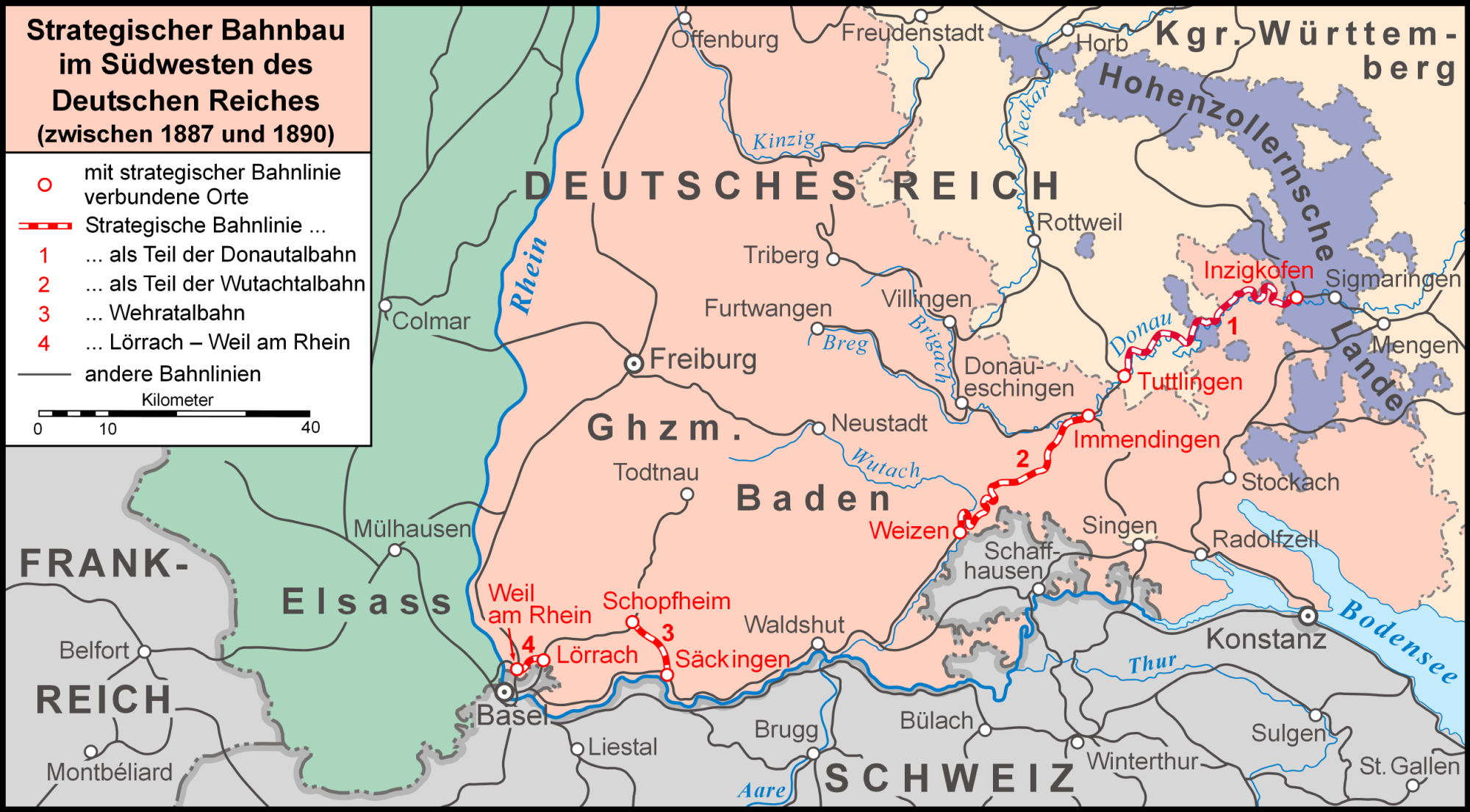
The line from Tuttlingen to Inzigkofen as part of the construction of the strategic railway between Weil am Rhein and Inzigkofen, including the borders at that time

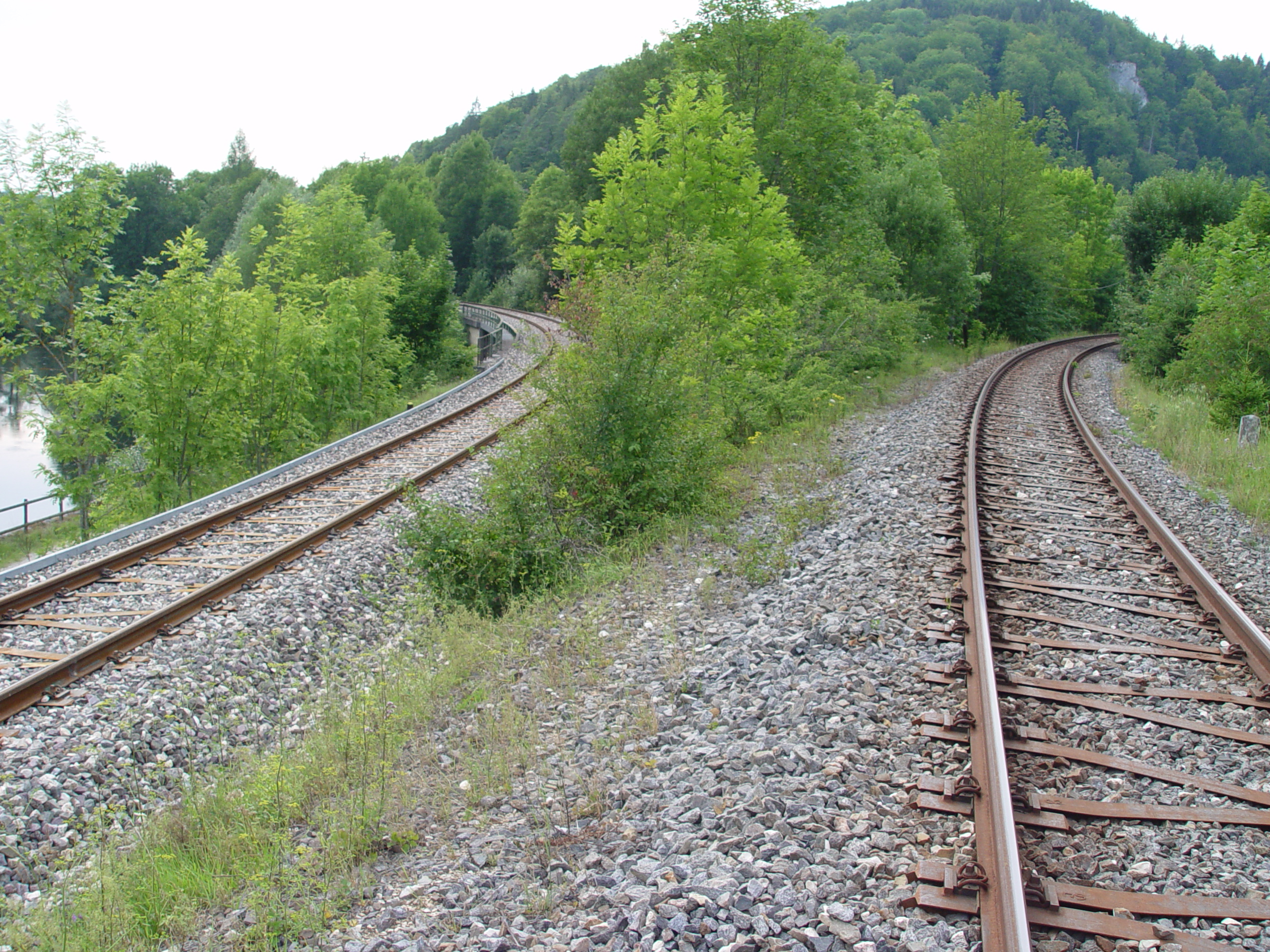
Junction near Inzigkofen with the line to Tuttlingen, which had run from Tübingen since 1878

The Ulm–Sigmaringen railway already existed in 1873, but an extension to the west and thus a connection to the Upper Neckar Railway in Tuttlingen was missing. To remedy this situation, Württemberg and Baden concluded a treaty on 22 May 1875, which authorised Württemberg to build a railway line from Inzigkofen to Tuttlingen within the next 15 years, but without setting a date for the start of construction.

Although the communities between Sigmaringen and Tuttlingen as well as the town of Tuttlingen continued to demand the construction of a railway, very little had happened since then. Nevertheless, the Royal Württemberg State Railways built the 5.1 km-long section between Sigmaringen and Inzigkofen as part of the Tübingen–Sigmaringen railway. This was completed in 1878.

This only changed fundamentally when the German general staff became interested in the route in the mid-1880s. The general staff were especially influenced by the experience of the Franco-Prussian War of 1870/1871. Railways had been extremely helpful in this war, and in the event of another war against France, it was believed that an efficient east–west link would be essential for victory. The supply of troops and equipment from Bavaria and Württemberg to Alsace, which had been annexed in 1871, was particularly problematic for the military. A rail connection from the federal fortress of Ulm to the Citadel of Belfort was considered to have central importance. The existing High Rhine Railway however, passed through the canton of Schaffhausen and Basel and thus through Swiss territory. Military use of this line had already been ruled out in the treaty between Baden and Switzerland in 1865. This line was unusable in the event of war. The German general staff therefore considered the need for a so-called strategic railways to bypass Swiss territory in the event of war. This made the construction of a Tuttlingen–Inzigkofen line useful.

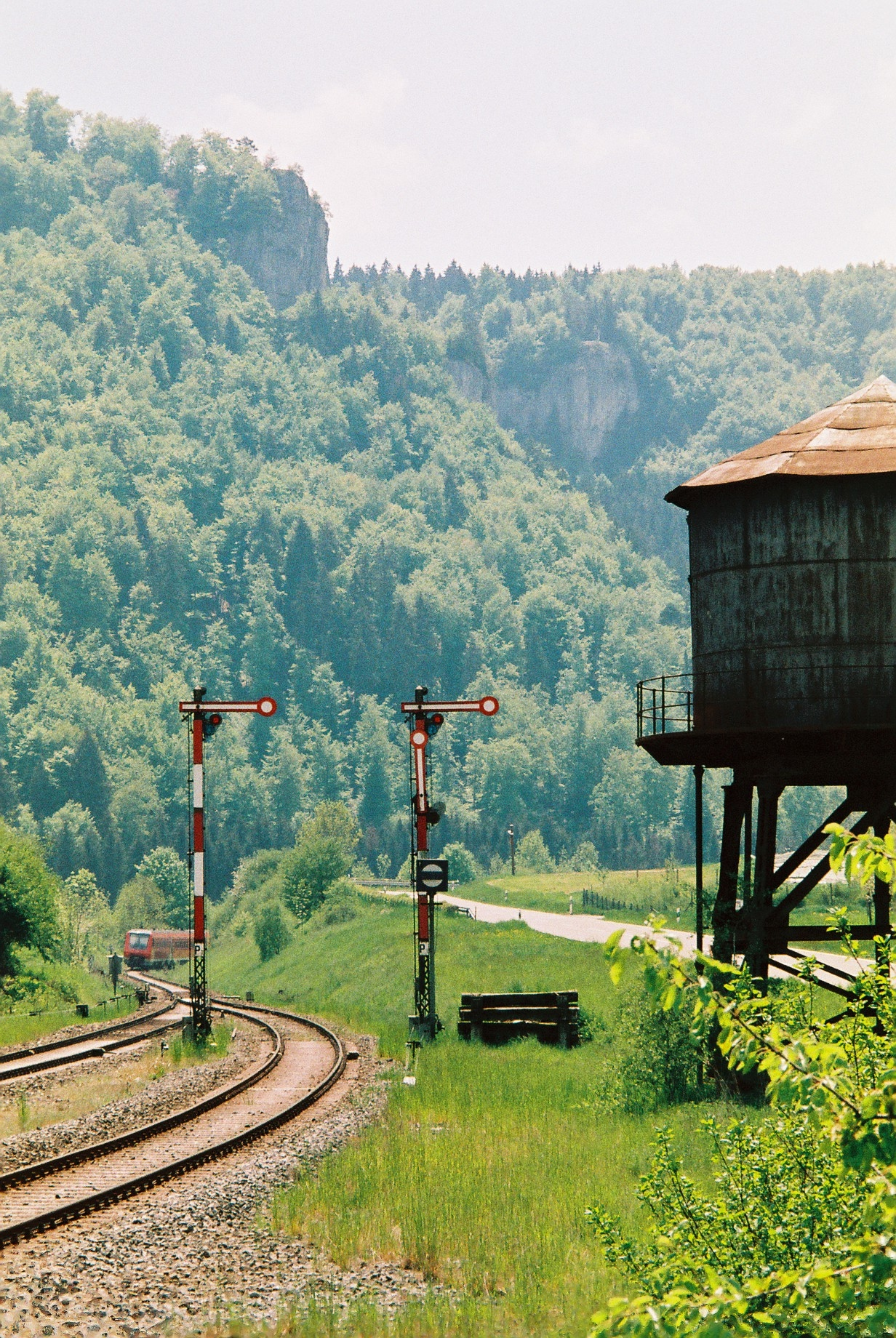
Water tower in Hausen im Tal

The existing Ulm–Sigmaringen–Inzigkofen line was to be extended to Tuttlingen and connected to the existing railway to Immendingen. Further, a new railway, which was to be built to bypass the Canton of Schaffhausen to reach Waldshut, which was built as the Wutach Valley Railway. From Waldshut to Säckingen trains would then run on the High Rhine Railway, exclusively in German territory. In Säckingen trains would then branch off the High Rhine Railway, which runs to Basel, and take a new railway connection to Schopfheim, which led to the construction of the Wehra Valley Railway. The existing Wiesen Valley Railway was to be used from Schopfheim to Lörrach, and a final railway section from Lörrach to Weil am Rhein, the Weil am Rhein–Lörrach railway (also called the Gartenbahn), needed to be built to connect to the existing line to Saint-Louis, Haut-Rhin. There, a connection could be made to Belfort.

Under pressure from the military, construction was undertaken to build these new railways, collectively known as the Kanonenbahnen ("cannon railways"). In 1887, the general staff contractually agreed to close the gap between Inzigkofen and Tuttlingen, and on 26 November 1890, 15 years after the signing of the treaty between Baden and Württemberg, this section was opened for service. The first train was a special train carrying not only the President of Württemberg, Hermann von Mittnacht, and representatives from Baden and Hohenzollern, but also leading generals of the German general staff. The Deutsche Reich (German Empire), whose military had been responsible for the impetus for the construction, financed a large part of the construction expenses. Württemberg, who had a civilian interest in the closing of the gap between Inzigkofen and Tuttlingen, came up with the rest of the funds. The route was built around 1890 with the help of Italian temporary immigrants.

=== 1890–1950: expansion and destruction ===
The high expectations, which the military had placed in the Danube Valley Railway in connection with the other railways in the southwest of Germany, were not met in either World War I or World War II.

Plans by Deutsche Reichsbahn from 1937 to upgrade the line completely to two tracks due to its military-strategic importance were given great attention during the Second World War, but were not taken up after the end of the war. The railway division of Stuttgart (Reichsbahndirektion Stuttgart) replaced the old station layout in Tuttlingen, which became a railway node when the line to Inzigkofen was completed, with a new system of tracks between 1928 and 1933.

The completion of the Höllentalbahn from Donaueschingen to Freiburg in 1901 made a direct connection between Ulm and Freiburg possible for the first time, something that had been under discussion since the 1850s. Starting in 1909, express trains were used to make this trip, which, starting in 1912, sometimes continued on to Colmar in the Alsace region. From 1913, express service was also provided from Munich via the Danube Valley Railway to Freiburg, which sometimes featured trains with a dining car. The average speed on the line, notwithstanding its use for long-distance connections, remained rather low, at under 50 km/h. With the exception of a few service issues during the two wars, service provided by express trains and local service trains, which stopped at every station and halt on the line, remained stable until 1945. This service was initially largely provided by the steam locomotives of the Württemberg C class, (Note: The types of engines used on the Danube Valley Railway in its early days are very difficult to ascertain. Especially before 1894, the available literature does not specify the locomotives used. After this time, Hans-Wolfgang Scharf (see Sources) attempts to determine the engines in use by looking at the classes of locomotives being kept in train depots on and near the Danube Valley Railway.) which were heavily used to the mid-1920s, but were then replaced by the Bavarian class P 3/5 H locomotives. After 1929, until the end of World War II, the modern engines of the class DRG Class 24 saw service. Freight service was of little significance on the Danube Valley Railway due to the lack of industrialisation along the route.

Towards the end of World War II, Allied air strikes reached the cities and towns along the railway. In December 1944, Allied bomber squadrons completely destroyed Ulm Hauptbahnhof, as well as the nearby shunting yard at Söflingen. Heavy damage was also caused during the course of 1944 at the stations in Mengen and Tuttlingen. The railway itself escaped most harm, and was serviceable, with some limitations, throughout the war. Heavy damage to the line was then caused by the retreating Wehrmacht, which blew up several railway bridges, making through traffic impossible until 1950, although some sections were operated again from 1946.

=== Since 1950: dismantling and service improvements ===
There were hardly any major improvements in the transport infrastructure after 1950. Although Deutsche Bundesbahn modernised the signaling systems, it also dismantled many sidings and closed down stations with little traffic. At the beginning of the 1990s, Deutsche Bundesbahn increasingly sold rail infrastructure to private owners. Large parts of Tuttlingen station are now privately owned. However, the line was not shut down. In the 1950s and 1960s, an outdated and frequently changing stock of steam locomotives of different origins was used. Until 1955 engines of the class Württemberg C dominated the scene, but starting in 1953, the Bavarian class S 3/6 started to replace the Württemberg C, until 1961. Then it was the turn of DRG Class 03 until 1971, which started to be replaced from 1966 by the diesel locomotives of the class V 200.

In terms of local service, until 1963 it was initially the Württemberg T 5 leading the trains, which started to be replaced from 1961 by the DRG Class 64. As was the case before the war, freight service was of little significance, and the freight that was carried on the line was handled by the DRB Class 50 steam locomotives until 1976, which started to be replaced, from 1969, by the diesel-powered DB Class V 90. As early as the 1950s, passenger service would sometimes see the use of diesel rail cars. The first diesel-powered vehicle on the Danube Valley Railway was the VT 60. Starting in 1961, units of the Uerdingen railbus, which dominated traffic in the 1970s, were added into service, and these units were seen up to 1995, but were replaced from 1988 with the diesel units of the DB Class 628, which provided most local passenger service until the turn of the century, and can still be seen now and then on the Danube Valley Railway today. The diesel engines of the DB Class V 160 led the longer-distance trains starting in 1966, and the DB Class 218 locomotives were added to this service in 1975. The service schedule in the 1950s was similar to the pre-1945 schedule, with the exception that through-traffic from Ulm to France was eliminated, as well as, starting in 1953, the elimination of direct service between Munich and Freiburg, which was replaced in 1954 by the Kleber-Express, using the Memmingen–Aulendorf–Herbertingen route instead of running via Ulm.

The express service offering remained stable until about the 1980s, and the average speed on the line by that time had been increased to 70 km/h. However, the local service schedule was reduced by the Deutsche Bundesbahn by the beginning of the 1990s. In 1988, the Deutsche Bundesbahn introduced a clock-face timetable, which was reinforced by some trains that ran outside the regular pattern. The trains now operated as RegionalSchnellBahn ("regional express trains", RSB) services and ran every two hours from Ulm to Neustadt (Schwarzw). In 2003 the section between Tuttlingen and Fridingen also became part of the Ringzug network, so that this section also benefited from better rail connections after the decline during the Bundesbahn period.

== Operations ==
=== Passenger services ===
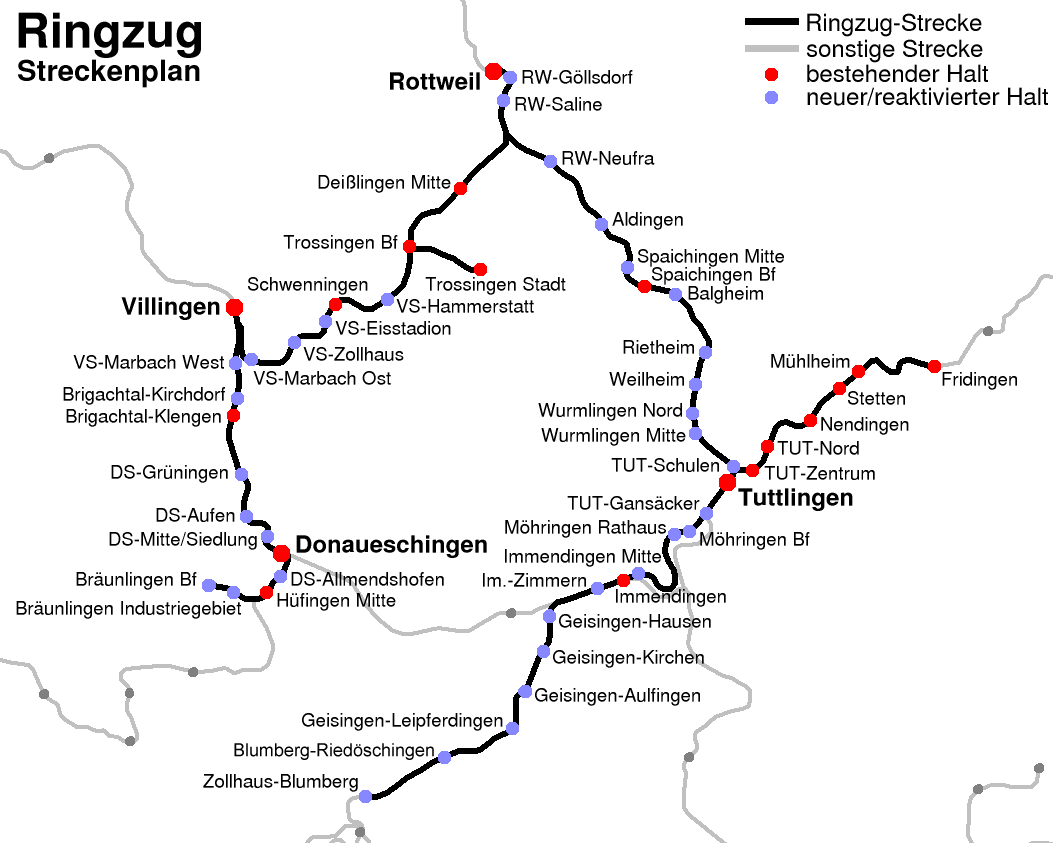
The Tuttlingen–Fridingen section is part of the Ringzug network

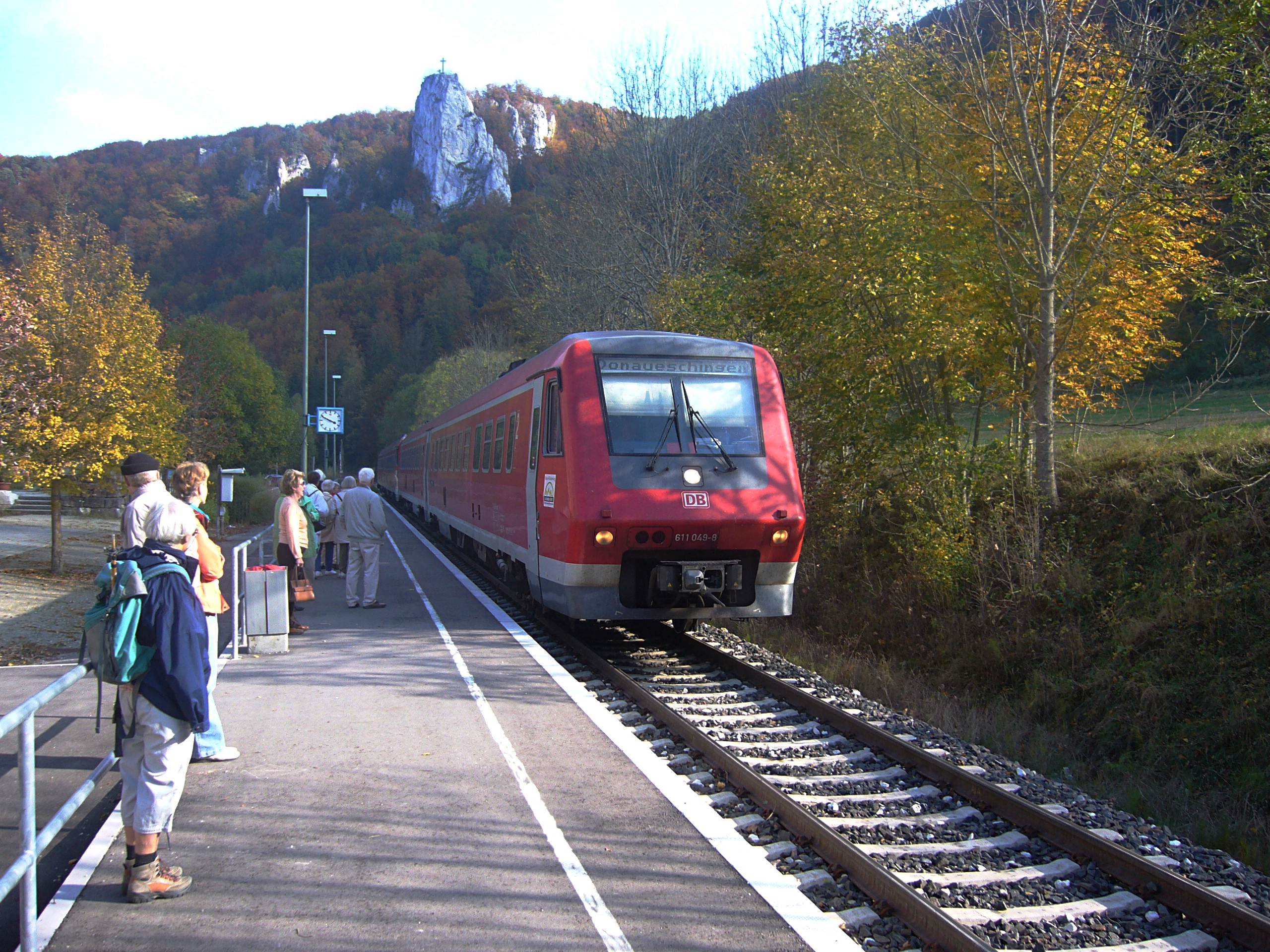
Regional-Express from Ulm to Donaueschingen/Neustadt (Schwarzw) at Beuron station

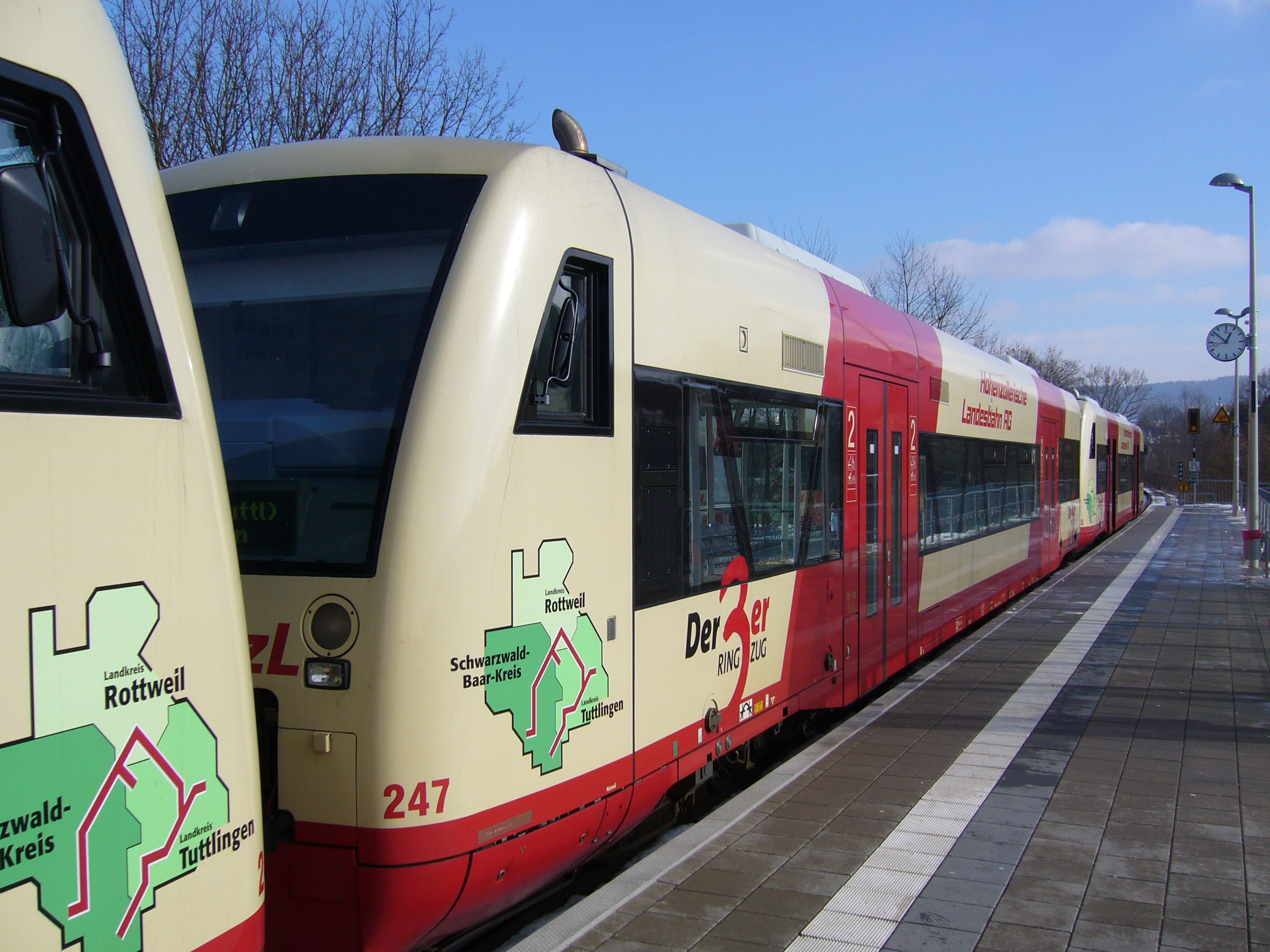
Ringzug train in triple traction at Tuttlingen Zentrum

It is served under a two-hourly clock-face timetable, Monday to Friday, at times hourly, with Regional-Express trains running between Ulm and Donaueschingen (some continuing to Villingen). Their average speed on the Tuttlingen–Inzigkofen section is under 70 km/h. The line between Tuttlingen and Fridingen is integrated into the Ringzug concept. Hohenzollerische Landesbahn (HzL) trains run from Fridingen to Tuttlingen, some continuing to Immendingen. However, the two-hourly timetable is not continuous with only six pairs of trains running on working days. No Ringzug trains run on the weekend. Between May and October, however, the Naturpark-Express runs on weekends between Gammertingen, Sigmaringen, Tuttlingen and Blumberg-Zollhaus, which provides additional capacity for carrying bicycles.

=== Freight ===
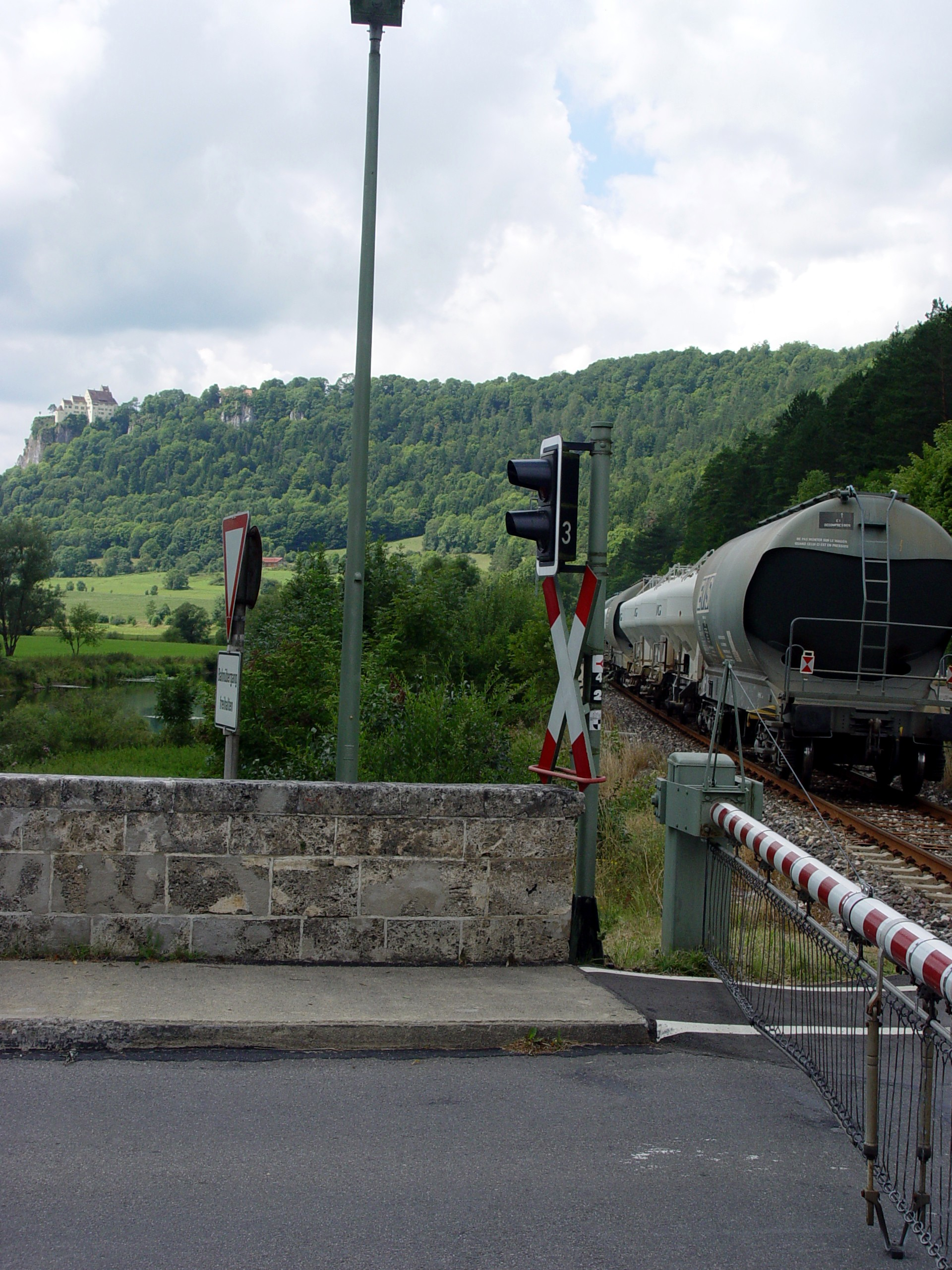
Freight train in Hausen im Tal, with Werenwag castle in the background

Hohenzollerische Landesbahn (HzL) operates freight traffic to/from the Fridingen metal works and the Börsig sawmill, also in Fridingen.

=== Rolling stock ===
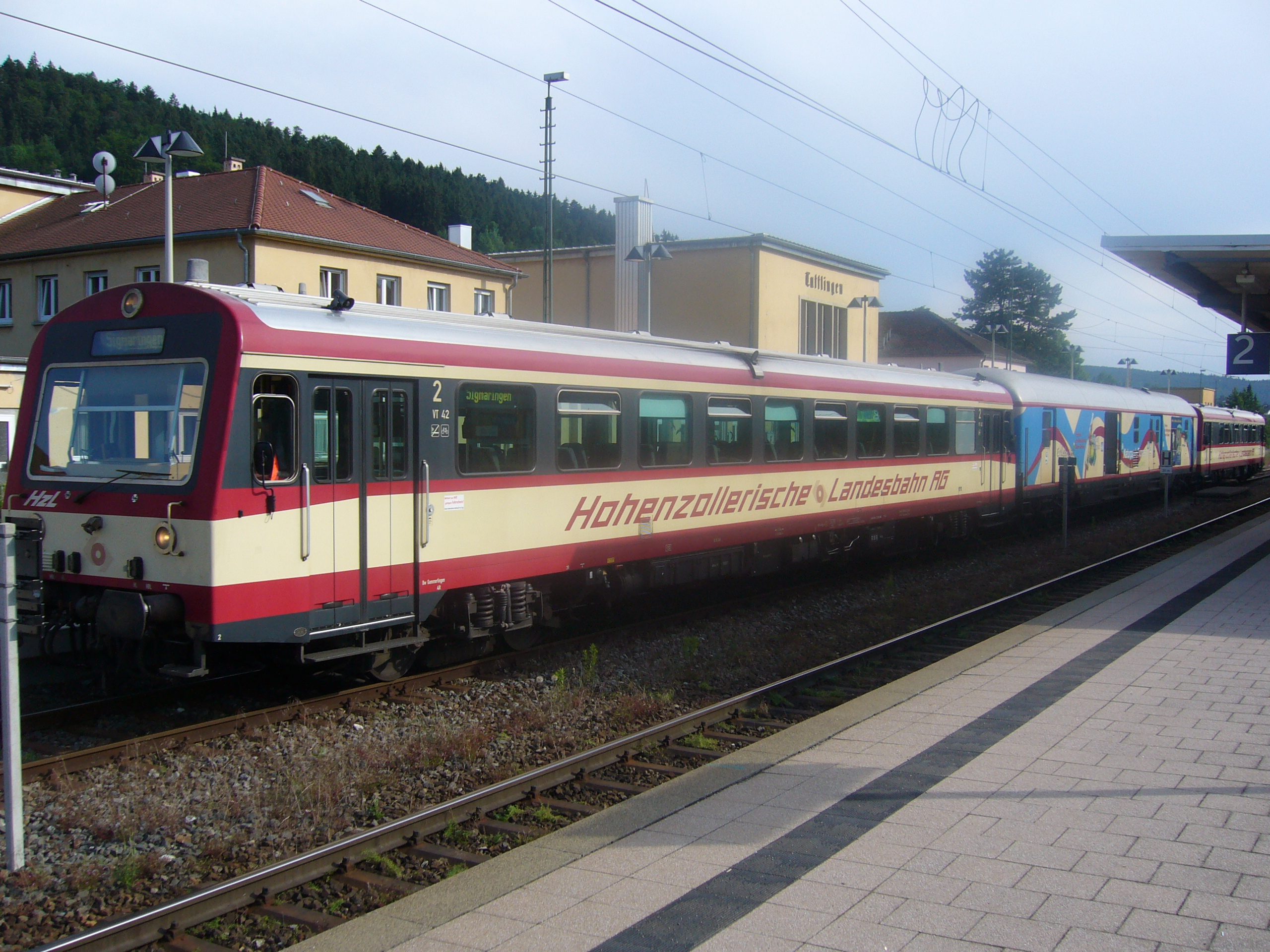
Naturpark-Express in Tuttlingen station

The Regional-Express services are mainly operated with class 612 railcars. The Ringzug trains are composed of Stadler Regio-Shuttles. The Naturpark-Express is operated with two NE 81 railcars with a former postal car coupled between them for carrying bicycles. Freight traffic is normally hauled by of class V 90 locomotives.

=== Signal boxes and signalling systems ===
Hausen im Tal and Fridingen stations still have mechanical signal boxes of the standard design. The points, entry and exit signals and level-crossing barriers are set and operated by the signalman via wire-haulage. An electronic interlocking of the Lorenz type has been installed in Tuttlingen station since 2004 and is remotely controlled from the Karlsruhe signalling control centre.

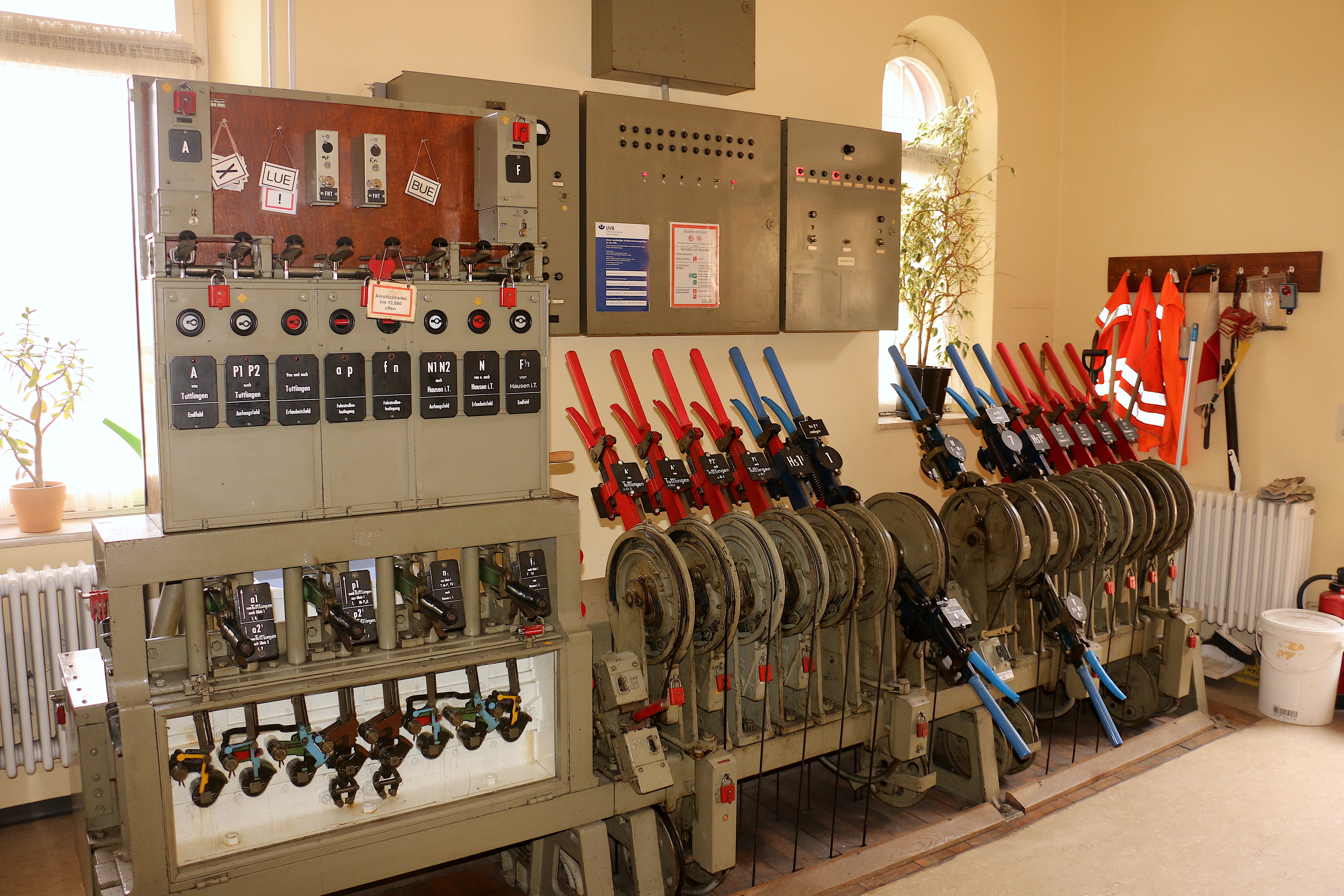
The mechanical signal box in Fridingen (2018)

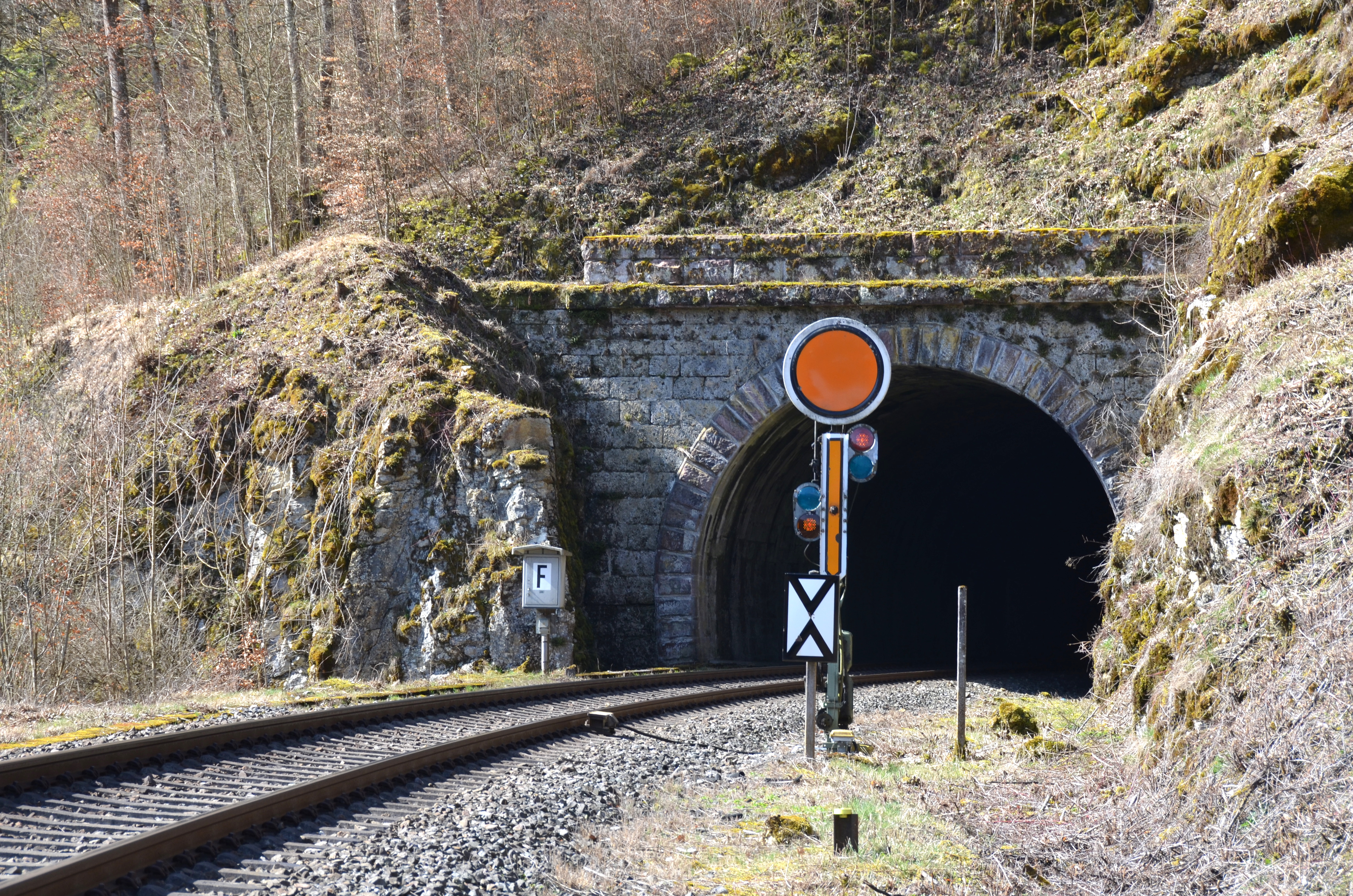
Distant entry signal of Fridingen station as a semaphore signal (before Schanz tunnel)

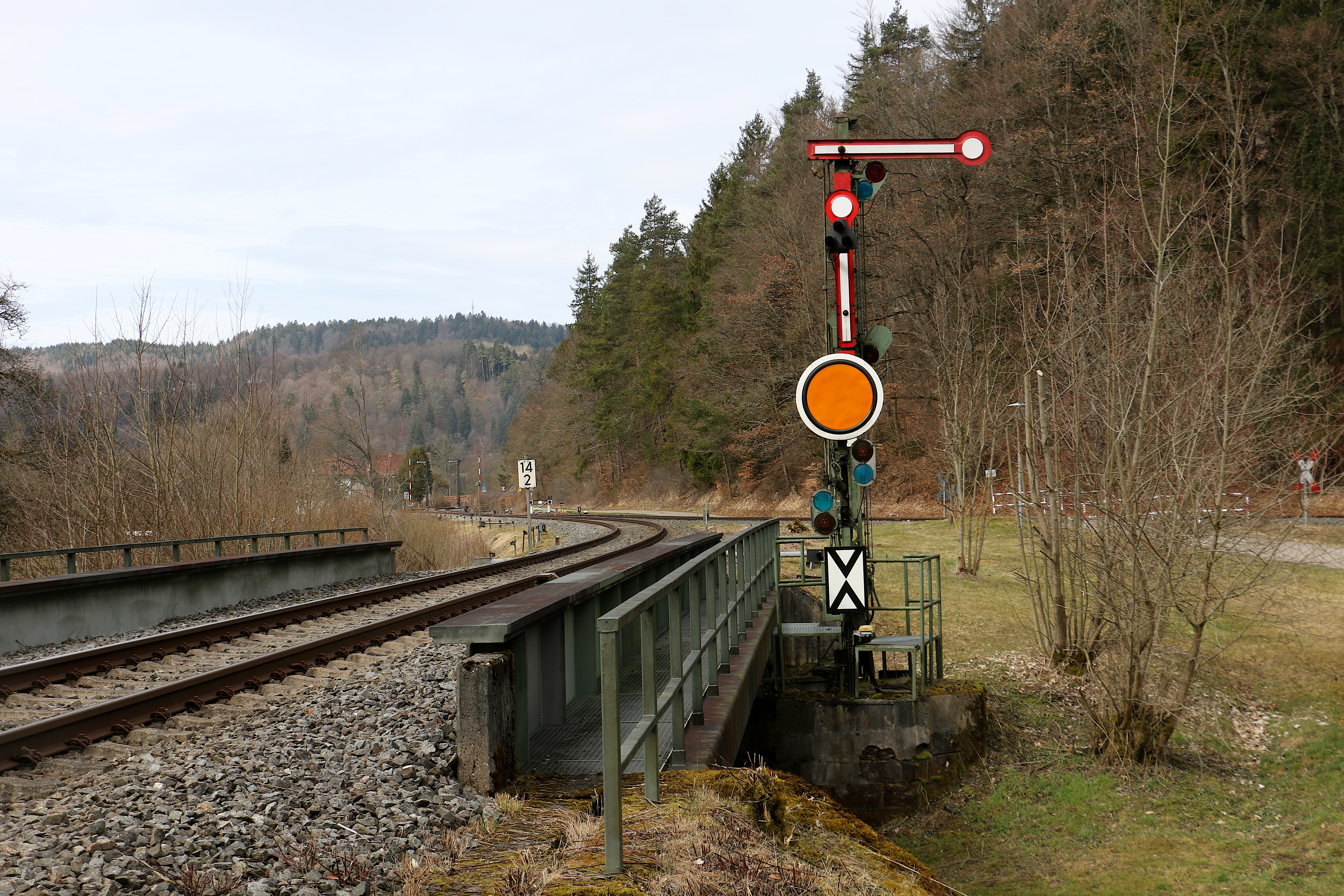
Semaphore entry signal at Fridingen station (2018)
