= Munderkingen station =

Train station in Germany

Munderkingen
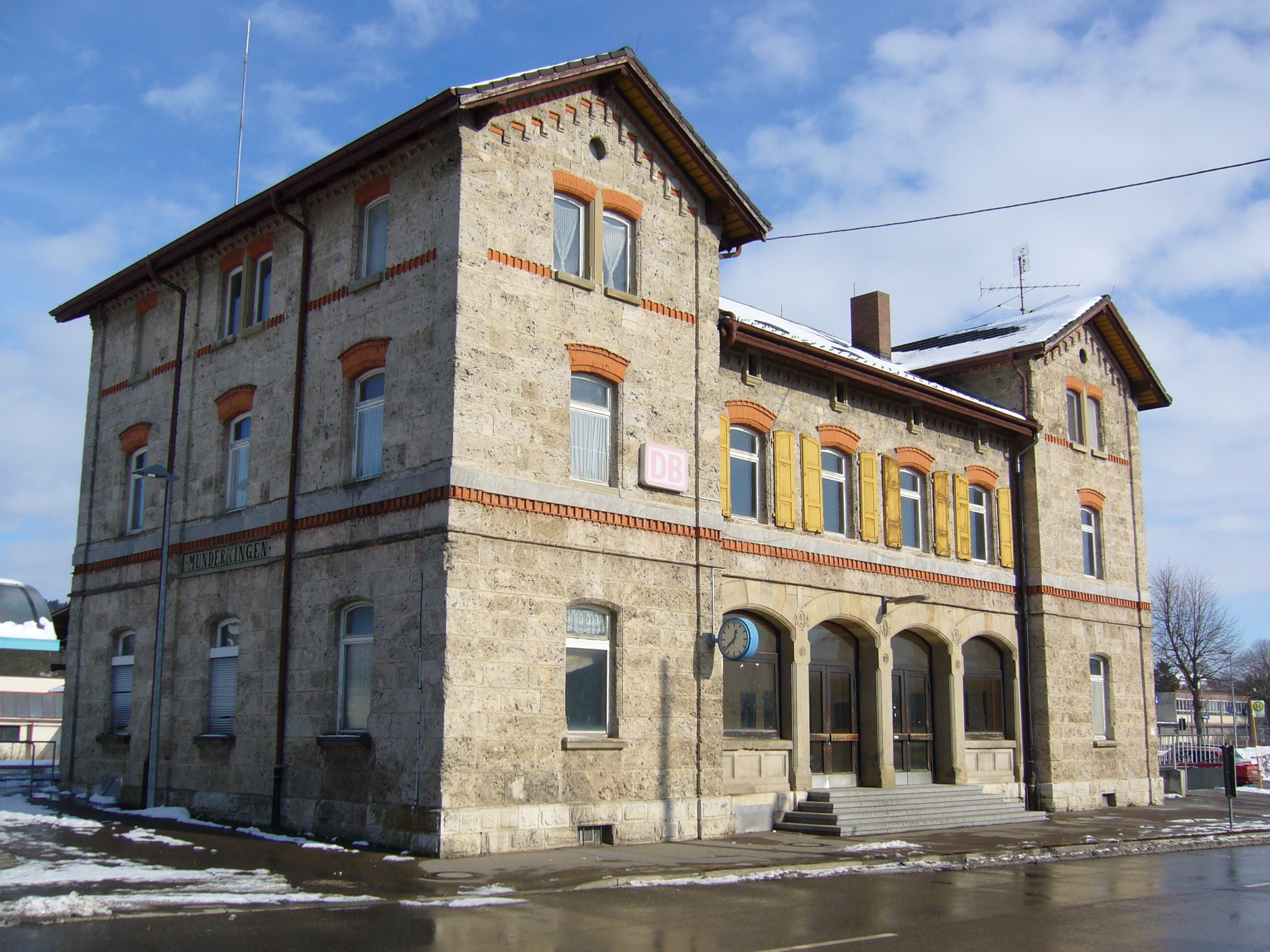
- 2007

General information
- Location: Bahnhofstraße 12; 89597 Munderkingen; Baden-Württemberg; Germany
- Coordinates: 48.2378°N 9.6460°E
- Elevation: 506 m (1,660 ft)
- System: Bf
- Owner: Deutsche Bahn
- Operator: DB Station&Service
- Lines: Ulm–Sigmaringen railway (KBS 755)
- Platforms: 2 side platforms
- Tracks: 2
- Train operators: DB Regio Baden-Württemberg; Hohenzollerische Landesbahn

Construction
- Parking: yes
- Cycle facilities: yes
- Accessible: yes

Other information
- Station code: 4275
- DS100 code: TMU
- IBNR: 8004182
- Category: 6
- Fare zone: DING: 78
- Website: www.bahnhof.de

Services
Preceding station	DB Regio Baden-Württemberg	Following station
Rechtenstein towards Villingen (Schwarzwald)	RE 55	Ehingen (Donau) towards Ulm Hbf
Preceding station	(Offenburg)	Following station
Terminus	RS 3	Rottenacker towards Ulm Hbf
Location
- Location within Baden-Württemberg Location within Germany Location within Europe

Munderkingen station is a railway station in the municipality of Munderkingen, located in the Alb-Donau-Kreis in Baden-Württemberg, Germany.
