= Oberelchingen station =

Railway station in the municipality of Elchingen

Oberelchingen

General information
- Location: Bahnhofstr. 89275 Elchingen-Oberelchingen; Bavaria; Germany
- Coordinates: 48°26′52″N 10°5′0″E
- Elevation: 460 m (1,510 ft)
- System: Hp
- Owner: DB Netz
- Operator: DB Station&Service
- Lines: Aalen–Ulm (KBS 757)
- Platforms: 1 side platform
- Tracks: 1
- Train operators: SWEG Bahn Stuttgart
- Connections: Bus interchange

Construction
- Parking: yes
- Accessible: yes

Other information
- Station code: 4635
- DS100 code: TOLC
- IBNR: 8004525
- Category: 7
- Fare zone: DING: 33
- Website: www.bahnhof.de

Services
Preceding station	(Stuttgart)	Following station
Thalfingen (b Ulm) towards Ulm Hbf	RS 51	Unterelchingen towards Langenau
Location
- Location within Bavaria Location within Germany Location within Europe

Oberelchingen station is a railway station in the municipality of Elchingen, located in the Neu-Ulm district in Bavaria, Germany. The station lies on the Brenz Railway. The train services are operated by SWEG Bahn Stuttgart.
