= Ulm Ost station =

Railway station in Ulm, Germany

Ulm Ost
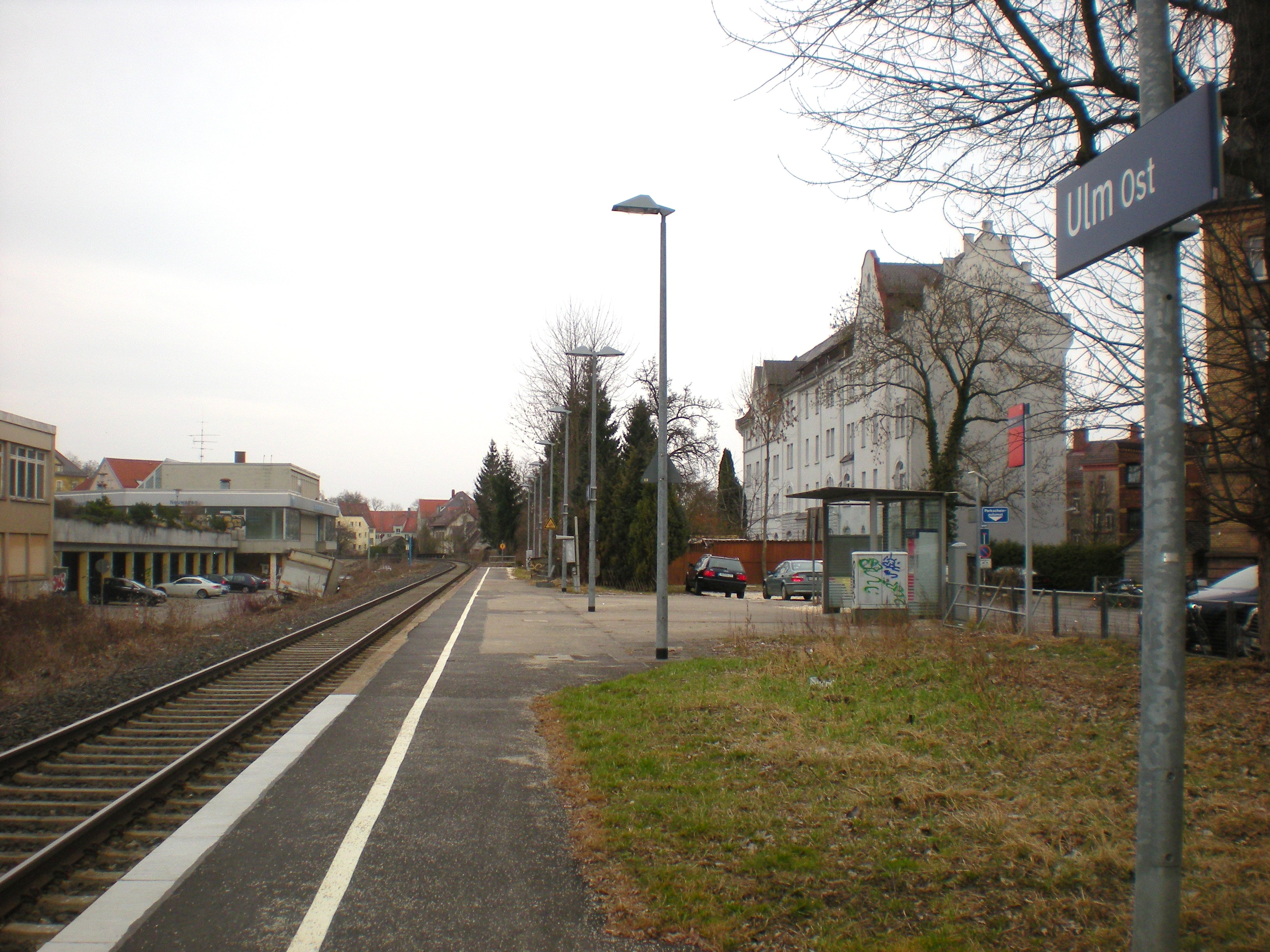
- 2012

General information
- Location: An der Brenzbahn; 89073 Ulm; Baden-Württemberg; Germany
- Coordinates: 48.4071°N 9.9948°E
- Owner: DB Netz
- Operator: DB Station&Service
- Lines: Brenz Railway (KBS 757)
- Platforms: 1 side platform
- Tracks: 1
- Train operators: Hohenzollerische Landesbahn

Other information
- Station code: 6324
- DS100 code: TUO
- IBNR: 8005952
- Category: 6
- Fare zone: DING: 10
- Website: www.bahnhof.de

Services
Preceding station	(Offenburg)	Following station
Ulm Hbf Terminus	RS 51	Thalfingen (b Ulm) towards Langenau (Württ)
Location

Ulm Ost station is a railway station in the eastern part of the town of Ulm, located in Baden-Württemberg, Germany.
