= Thalfingen (b Ulm) station =

Railway station in Germany

Thalfingen (b Ulm)

General information
- Location: 89275 Elchingen; Bayern; Germany
- Coordinates: 48.432989°N 10.047866°E
- System: Through station
- Owner: DB Netz
- Operator: DB Station&Service
- Lines: Brenz Railway (KBS 757)
- Platforms: 2 side platform
- Tracks: 2
- Train operators: Hohenzollerische Landesbahn

Other information
- Station code: 6186
- DS100 code: TTL
- IBNR: 8005845
- Category: 6
- Fare zone: DING: 20/33
- Website: www.bahnhof.de

Services
Preceding station	(Offenburg)	Following station
Ulm Hbf towards Ulm Hbf	RS 5	Langenau towards Aalen Hbf
Ulm Ost towards Ulm Hbf	RS 51	Oberelchingen towards Langenau (Württ)
Location
- Location within Baden-Württemberg Location within Germany Location within Europe

Thalfingen (b Ulm) station is a railway station in the town of Elchingen, located in Bayern, Germany. It is owned and operated by Deutsche Bahn. The station lies on the Brenz Railway and the train services are operated by Hohenzollerische Landesbahn.

== Train services ==
The station is served by the following services:

RS 5	Ulm – Thalfingen – Langenau (Württ) – Giengen (Brenz) – Heidenheim – Oberkochen – Aalen	every hour	Hohenzollerische Landesbahn
RS 51	Ulm – Thalfingen Langenau (Württ)	every hour	Hohenzollerische Landesbahn
