= Ulm Hauptbahnhof =

Railway station in Ulm, Germany

Ulm Hbf
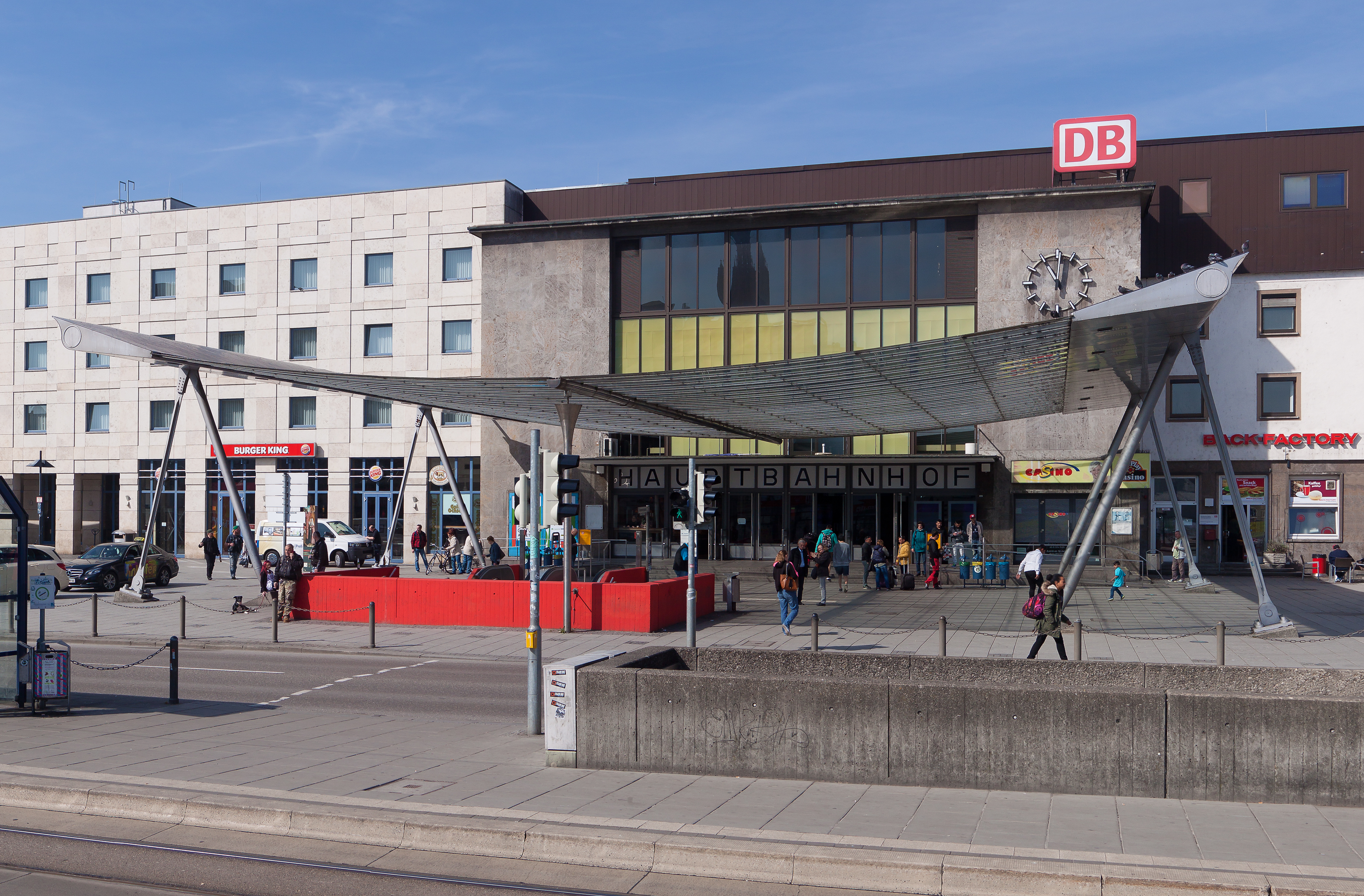
- Entrance from east

General information
- Location: Bahnhofplatz 1, Ulm, Baden-Württemberg; Germany
- Coordinates: 48°24′0″N 9°59′0″E
- Owner: Deutsche Bahn
- Operator: DB Netz; DB Station&Service
- Lines: Ulm–Stuttgart (KBS 750); Ulm–Augsburg (KBS 980); Ulm–Friedrichshafen (KBS 751); Ulm–Sigmaringen (KBS 755); Ulm–Oberstdorf (KBS 975); Ulm–Ingolstadt (KBS 993); Ulm–Aalen (KBS 757); Ulm-Wendlingen (KBS 750.1)
- Platforms: 12
- Train operators: DB Fernverkehr; DB Regio Baden-Württemberg; DB Regio Bayern; agilis; SWEG Bahn Stuttgart; Go-Ahead Baden-Württemberg; Schwäbische Alp-Bahn

Construction
- Accessible: Yes

Other information
- Station code: 6323
- DS100 code: TU
- IBNR: 8000170
- Category: 2
- Fare zone: DING: 10
- Website: www.bahnhof.de

History
- Opened: 1 June 1850; 176 years ago
- Electrified: 15 May 1933; 93 years ago

Passengers
- 29,000 (2005)
Services
Preceding station	DB Fernverkehr	Following station
Stuttgart Hbf towards Berlin Gesundbrunnen	ICE 11	Günzburg towards München Hbf
Stuttgart Hbf towards Köln Hbf or Düsseldorf Hbf	ICE 42	Augsburg Hbf towards München Hbf
Stuttgart Hbf towards Köln Hbf or Düsseldorf Hbf	ICE 42	Günzburg some trains towards München Hbf
Stuttgart Hbf towards Saarbrücken Hbf	ICE 47	Augsburg Hbf towards München Hbf
Stuttgart Hbf towards Frankfurt (Main) Hbf, Hamburg-Altona or Berlin Ostbahnhof	ICE 48	Günzburg towards München Hbf
Göppingen towards Dortmund Hbf	ICE 55 Allgäu	Memmingen towards Oberstdorf
Stuttgart Hbf towards Karlsruhe Hbf, Basel SBB or Saarbrücken Hbf	ICE 60	Augsburg Hbf towards München Hbf
Stuttgart Hbf towards Frankfurt (Main) Hbf or Münster Hbf	ICE 62	Günzburg towards Graz Hbf
Stuttgart Hbf towards Dortmund Hbf	ICE 62 Bodensee	Biberach an der Riß towards Innsbruck Hbf
Stuttgart Hbf towards Amsterdam Centraal	ICE 78	Augsburg Hbf towards München Hbf
Stuttgart Hbf towards Paris Est	ICE/TGV 83	Augsburg Hbf towards München Hbf
Preceding station	ÖBB	Following station
Stuttgart Hbf Terminus	Nightjet	Augsburg Hbf towards Budapest-Keleti, Venezia Santa Lucia or Zagreb Glavni kolodvor
Preceding station	SVG Stuttgart	Following station
Plochingen towards Stuttgart Hbf	FEX Südbahn	Aulendorf towards Singen (Hohentwiel)
Preceding station		Following station
Terminus	RE 9	Neu-Ulm towards München Hbf
Preceding station	DB Regio Bayern	Following station
Terminus	RE 75	Illertissen towards Oberstdorf
Terminus	RS 7	Neu-Ulm towards Memmingen
Terminus	RS 71	Neu-Ulm towards Weißenhorn
Preceding station		Following station
Terminus	RB 15	Neu-Ulm towards Ingolstadt Hbf
Preceding station	(Stuttgart)	Following station
Ulm-Söflingen towards Munderkingen	RS 3	Terminus
Thalfingen (b Ulm) towards Aalen Hbf	RS 5	Terminus
Ulm Ost towards Langenau	RS 51	Terminus
Preceding station		Following station
Geislingen (Steige) towards Stuttgart Hbf	MEX 16	Terminus
Preceding station	Schwäbische Alb-Bahn	Following station
Terminus	RB 59	Herrlingen towards Gammertingen
Preceding station	DB Regio Baden-Württemberg	Following station
Terminus	RE 3	Biberach (Riß) towards Lindau-Reutin
Geislingen towards Stuttgart Hbf	RE 5	Erbach (Württ) towards Lindau-Reutin
Langenau (Württ) towards Aalen Hbf	RE 50	Terminus
Blaubeuren towards Villingen (Schwarzwald)	RE 55	Terminus
Merklingen - Schwäbische Alb towards Wendlingen (Neckar)	RE 200	Terminus
Terminus	RS 2	Ulm-Donautal towards Biberach (Riß) Süd
Terminus	RS 21	Ulm-Donautal towards Biberach (Riß) Süd
Location

Ulm Hauptbahnhof is the main station in the city of Ulm, which lies on the Danube, on the border of the German states of Baden-Württemberg and Bavaria in the Danube-Iller region (Region Donau-Iller).

Ulm Hauptbahnhof has twelve platforms, of which five are terminating platforms, and forms a major railway junction. Other stations in the city are Ulm-Söflingen to the west and Ulm Ost (east) to the east and Ulm-Donautal (Danube valley) in the industrial area. The Ulm marshalling yard is located to the west of the city. Neu-Ulm (New Ulm), which lies across the Danube in Bavaria, has the stations of Neu-Ulm, Finningerstraße and Gerlenhofen.

Ulm is located on the railway line from Stuttgart to Munich, over which Intercity-Express trains operate, and part of the Magistrale for Europe (trunk line) from Paris to Budapest. European cities such as Amsterdam, Budapest, Paris and Linz can be reached without transfers. Every day, about 29,000 passengers use the station. It is used daily by about 335 trains operated by Deutsche Bahn, SWEG, Arverio, Schwäbische Alb-Bahn and Agilis, 75 long-distance and 260 regional trains. The station is served by local trains that are coordinated by the Donau-Iller-Nahverkehrsverbund (Danube-Iller Local Transport Association, DING).

== Location ==
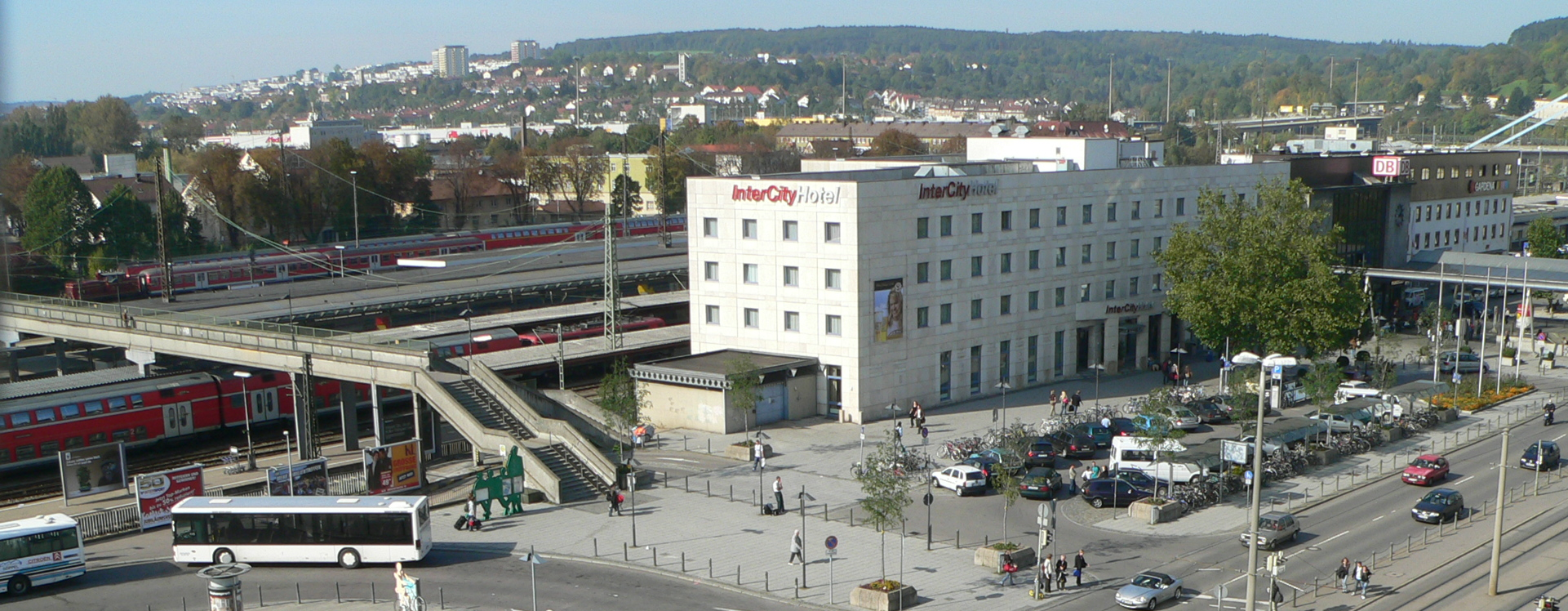
Station from the southeast, old station footbridge and InterCityHotel

Ulm Hauptbahnhof is to the west of central Ulm. The station building is located in the east of the tracks on Bahnhofplatz (station square or forecourt). East of the station is Friedrich-Ebert-Strasse, which becomes Olgastraße at the forecourt. Opposite the station building Bahnhofstrasse (station street) runs from the forecourt towards Münsterplatz (cathedral square), which is about 500 metres away. Schillerstraße runs west of the station. Federal highway 19, which is called Karlstraße at this point, crosses the tracks to the north of the station over Ludwig Erhard Bridge, formerly called the Blaubeurer-Tor (Blaubeuren Gate) bridge. In the south, Neuen Straße runs under the tracks through the Ehinger-Tor (Ehingen Gate) underpass and Zinglerstraße crosses over the tracks on Zingler Bridge. Southeast of the station building is the Ulm central bus station.

=== Railway lines ===
The Ulm Hauptbahnhof is the hub of several major railway lines. The Fils Valley Railway, running via Geislingen, Göppingen and Plochingen to Stuttgart, is a double-track and electrified main line, used for domestic and international long-distance traffic at a maximum speed of 160 km/h. Long-distance services also run from Ulm on the electrified and double-track main line via Günzburg to Augsburg, which has a maximum speed of 200 km/h (124 mph). Both railways are used by InterCity Express, Intercity and EuroCity trains. The Ulm–Friedrichshafen railway, running via Biberach (Riss), Aulendorf and Ravensburg to Friedrichshafen is a double track and non-electrified line. The route is upgraded for 140 km/h and serves mainly regional traffic, although an intercity train pair runs over it each day.

In addition, two lines begin in Ulm: the Ulm–Sigmaringen railway via Ehingen (Donau) to Sigmaringen (continuing as the Tuttlingen–Inzigkofen railway to Tuttlingen and the Black Forest Railway to Donaueschingen) and the Aalen–Ulm railway via Heidenheim to Aalen. These two lines are single track and non-electrified railways that are used by regional services, although the Ulm–Sigmaringen railway has two tracks as far as Herrlingen.

Specifically Ulm is served by the following timetable (KBS) routes:

- KBS 750: Ulm–Geislingen–Göppingen–Plochingen–Stuttgart
- KBS 751: Ulm–Biberach (Riss)–Aulendorf–Ravensburg–Friedrichshafen
- KBS 755: Ulm–Ehingen (Donau)–Sigmaringen–Tuttlingen–Donaueschingen
- KBS 756: Ehingen (Donau)–Ulm–Memmingen
- KBS 757: Ulm–Heidenheim–Aalen
- KBS 975: Ulm–Memmingen–Kempten–Oberstdorf
- KBS 980: Ulm–Gunzburg–Augsburg
- KBS 993: Ulm–Günzburg–Donauwörth–Ingolstadt–Regensburg.

== History ==
As early as 1834, there were plans for a railway between Cannstatt, Ulm and Friedrichshafen. In August 1835, some citizens of Ulm joined formed an initiative to promote its construction. Then on 21 December 1835, the Ulm Railway Company (Ulmer Eisenbahngesellschaft) was founded; it had already spent 80,000 guilders on the day of its incorporation. On 18 April 1843, the construction of the section from Stuttgart through the Swabian Alb (Swabian Jura) range to Ulm was approved rather than the originally planned, longer variation via Aalen. However, there were arguments about the location of Ulm station. The military architect Moritz Karl Ernst von Prittwitz and the city and cathedral architect Ferdinand Thrän favoured an option for a station to the north of the centre on an east–west alignment. Because this option would have meant that the extension of the line to Friedrichshafen would have run through Bavarian territory, the Württemberg engineers instead planned a railway station aligned north–south at its current location to the west of the city. Although the price of this land was higher and nine roads were disrupted, compared to the disruption of only three roads under the northern option, the north–south option was chosen. Ulm’s western suburbs are now separated from the inner city as a result.

In the race against Bavaria and Baden to complete the first rail connection to Lake Constance, Württemberg began building the Southern Railway to Friedrichshafen via Biberach, with major work beginning in the summer of 1847. The first earthworks and foundation works for Ulm station in August 1848 and work began on the buildings in March 1849. The contracts for the excavation, blasting and construction were awarded by the Royal Württemberg State Railways to small contractors. Because of possible landslides on Kuhberg (hill), just before Ulm station, the Danube was moved and the Southern Railway was built on reclaimed land on the old river bed. The economy of Ulm benefited from the construction, particularly establishments supplying meals for the workforce. The first locomotive trial ran from Biberach to Ulm on 17 May 1850.

=== 1850–1866: opening and connecting to other railway lines ===
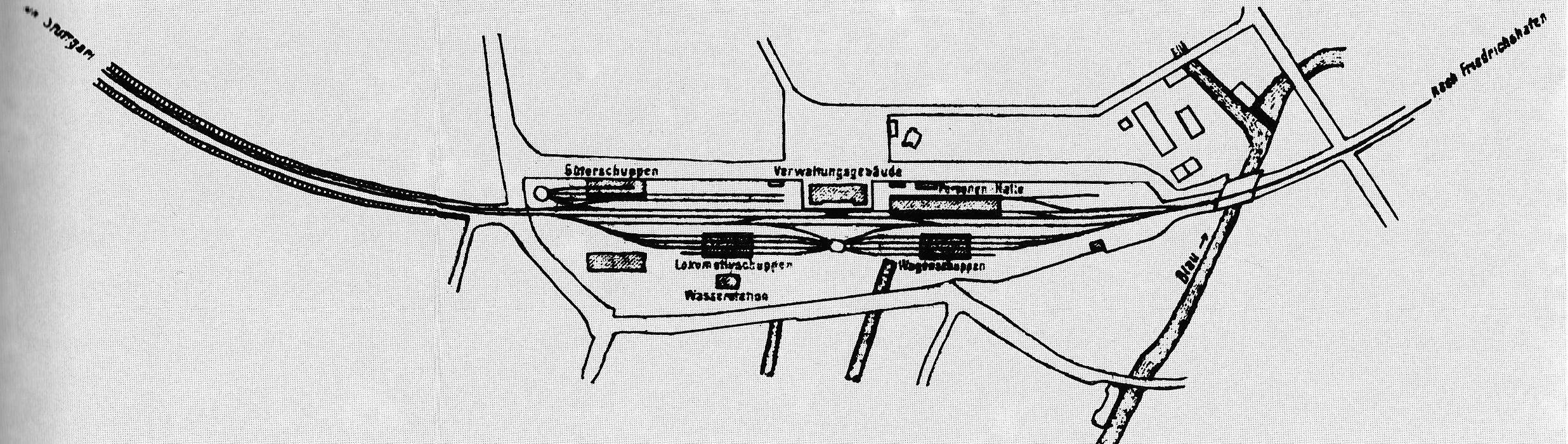
Map of Ulm station in 1850

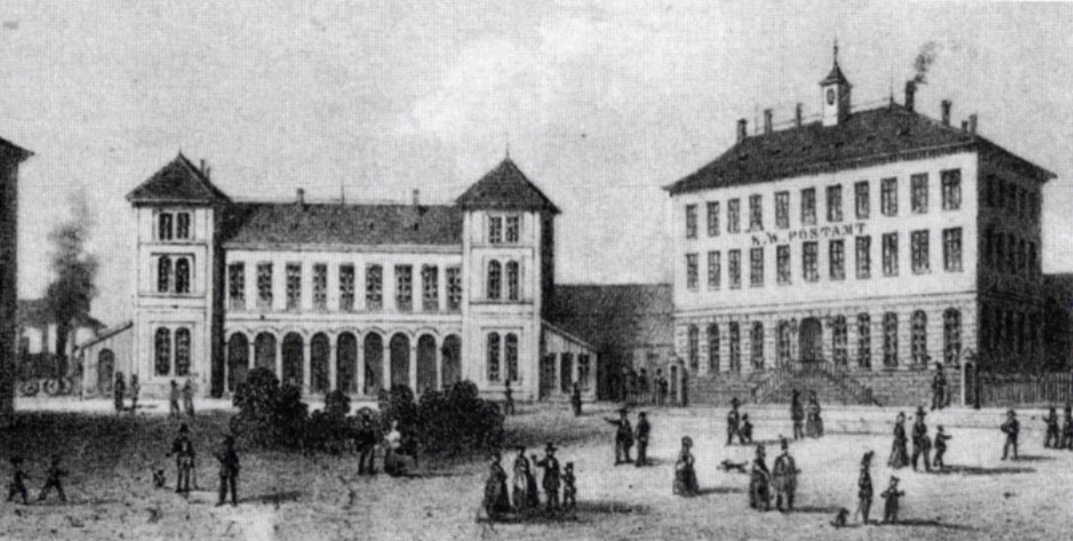
First Ulm station from 1850 and post office in 1855

Ulm station was officially opened together with the last section of the Southern Railway from Biberach to Ulm on 1 June 1850. On 29 June 1850, the railway up the Geislinger Steige pass over the Swabian Alb between Geislingen and Amstetten was completed, allowing the Württemberg East Railway (Fils Valley Railway), running to Stuttgart via Göppingen, to be taken into operation, so that through trains could run from Heilbronn to Friedrichshafen. Thus, the first railway line across Württemberg was completed. The climb over the Geislinger Steige was a technical masterpiece for the time and attracted attention throughout Europe. Three trains ran each day through the three tracks of the station towards Stuttgart and Friedrichshafen. The travel time between Ulm and Stuttgart was four hours and between Ulm and Friedrichshafen it was three hours and 15 minutes. The station building, which was designed by the architect Ludwig Friedrich Gaab in a style combining gothic revival and neoclassical elements, was opened in December 1850. It consisted of a two-story central building, which had three-storey side towers at each end, and contained on the ground floor an entrance hall, two waiting rooms, a station restaurant, a luggage room, a room for the service staff, a room for the porter and two cash rooms with anterooms. Upstairs there were storage rooms and living areas. Ashlar, brick and crushed stone were used as materials. Two entrance halls to the station building were built in 1851. Also built were a roundhouse, a carriage house, a goods shed, a water station and several other buildings. Railway telegraph was connected to the station on 16 April 1851 and Ulm station opened a porter service on 9 October 1851.

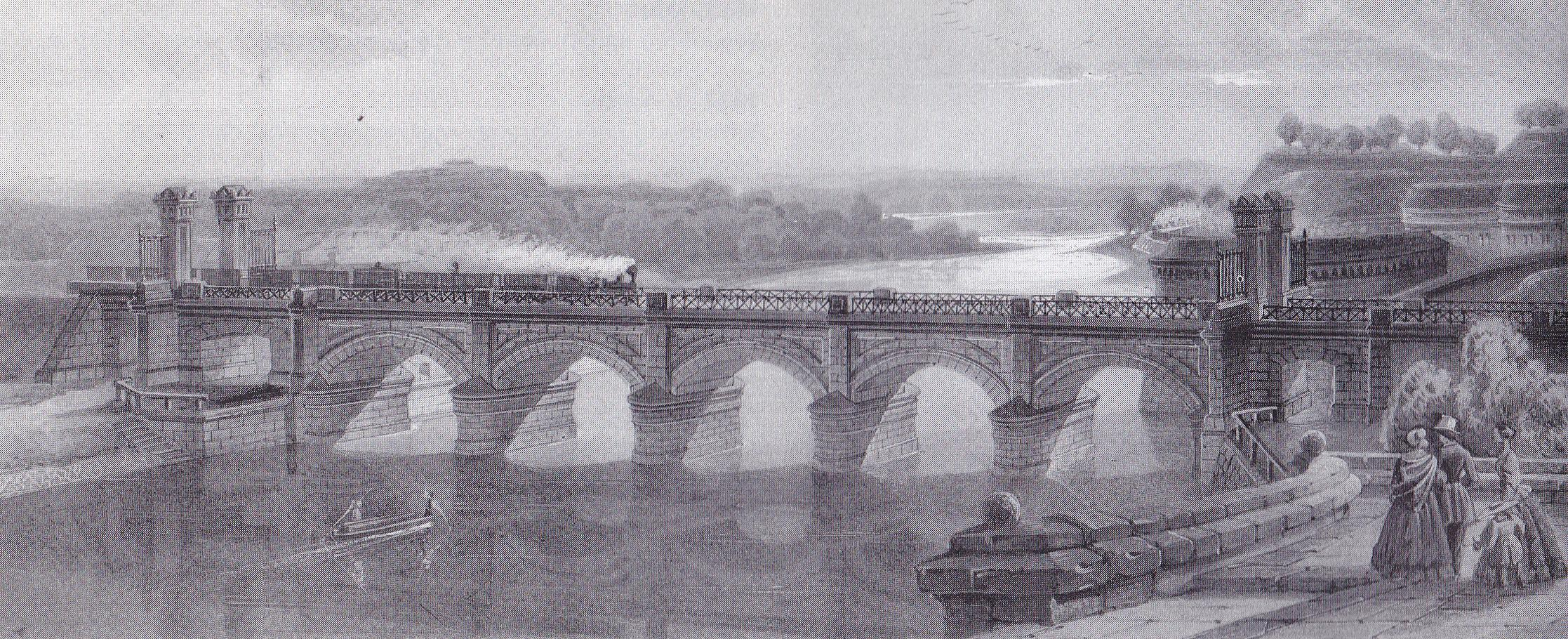
Railway bridge over the Danube in 1855

On 25 April 1850, the Kingdom of Bavaria signed a treaty with the Kingdom of Württemberg to extend the railway line between Munich and Augsburg to Ulm and connect with the Württemberg railway network. In March 1852, construction began on the railway bridge over the Danube. The first train arrived at Neu-Ulm station after 25 December 1853; this was officially opened on 26 September together with the Neu-Ulm–Burgau section of the Bavarian Maximilian’s Railway. Since the Danube bridge had not yet been completed, a droshky service operated between Ulm and Neu-Ulm station. The Danube bridge, which from the beginning was designed for two tracks, was completed on 1 May 1854. This consisted of Keuper sandstone and was 123 metres long and 8.55 metres wide. It was called the Wilhelm-Maximilian Bridge in honour of the reigning kings of Württemberg and Bavaria and it had iron gates at both ends. On 1 June, the entire Maximilian’s Railway from Ulm to Augsburg was opened to Munich and Ulm station became a railway junction. Four trains ran daily each way on the new line, with express trains taking three hours 30 minutes and ordinary passenger trains taking five to six hours. The station was a border station and an interchange station between Bavaria and Württemberg with separate station facilities operated by the two kingdoms. The Royal Bavarian State Railways’ operations were in the southern part of the station in its own wing of the station building, which had bay platforms. It became known as the Bayerischer Bahnhof (Bavarian station). Since Bavarian time was ten minutes ahead of Württemberg time, there were two different times used at the station. At the end of 1856, the line between Ulm and Neu-Ulm was duplicated.

In 1855, a separate winter and spring timetable was introduced. On 17 May 1856, the connection through Ulm was opened to international trade, allowing the transportation of wood, grain, tobacco, cement, bricks and coal for the steam engines by rail. Steam engines were being installed because the current of the Blau was no longer sufficient to supply the increasing demand for energy. Ulm doubled its exports between 1852 and 1855. A post office opened in February 1856 and the first hotel (Hôtel de Russie, later renamed Zum Russischen Hof) was opened at the station on 1 May 1857. On 12 October 1862, the Iller Valley Railway was opened from Neu-Ulm to Memmingen with four trains running daily and it was extended to Kempten on 1 June 1863. The same day, the second track of the Fils Valley Railway from Ulm to Stuttgart was taken into operation after four years of construction. Once the Royal Bavarian Railways Office was moved to New Ulm, on 1 January 1861, the operations of the existing Württemberg and Bavaria joint station was transferred completely to Württemberg, with the exception of vehicle and locomotive operations, by 1 December 1863. Part of Bahnhofstraße (station street), which was completed in 1867, was built in January 1865, covering over the Blau. Part of the fortress wall built in the Middle Ages was demolished at the end of 1866 to give the station direct access to the city centre. In 1866, the private entrepreneur Philip Berblinger built the Berblinger building with 36 apartments at the end of Karlstraße as the first building in Ulm for railway workers.

=== 1867–1891: first and second phase of expansion ===
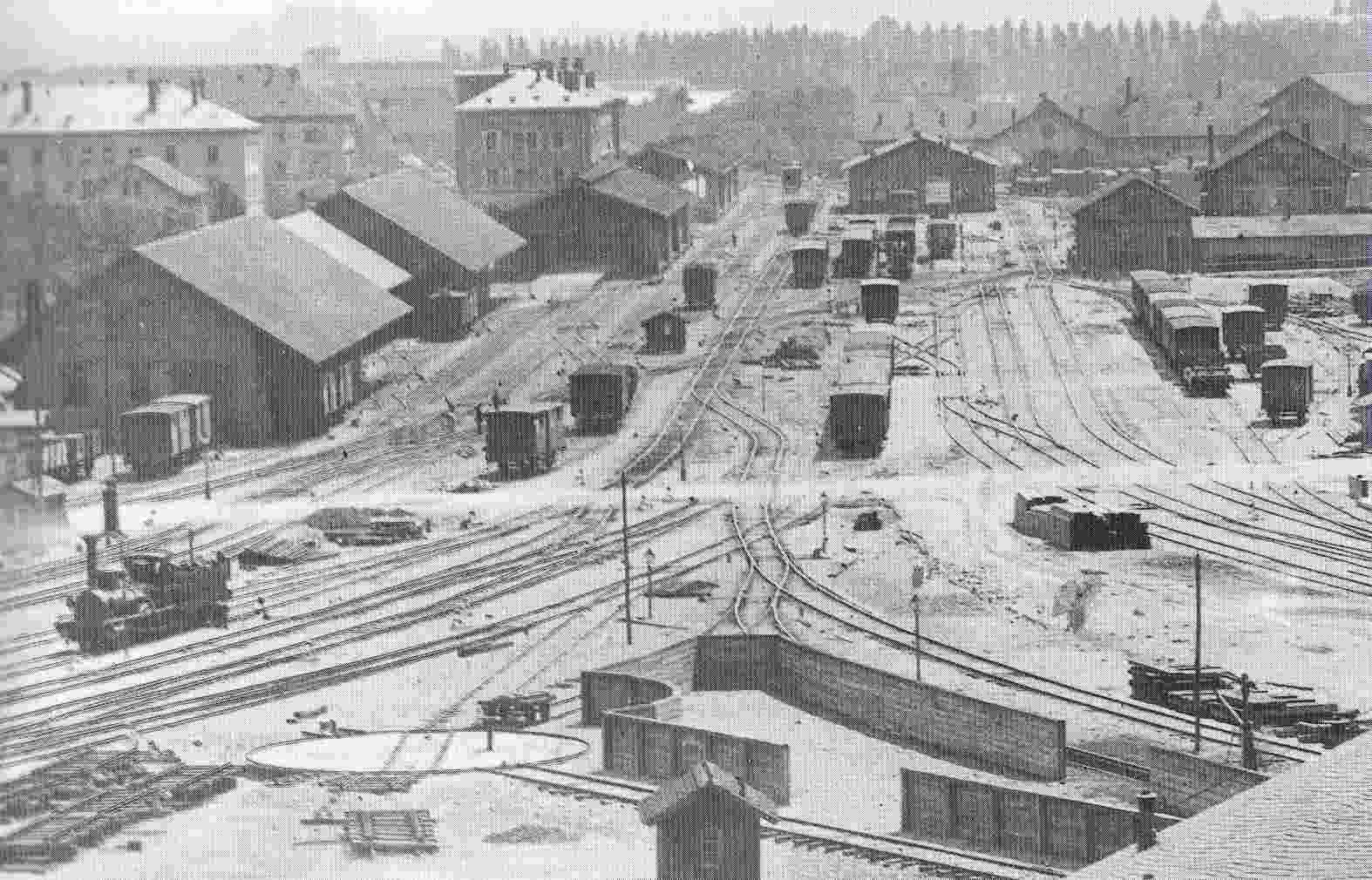
Ulm Station and workshop 1870

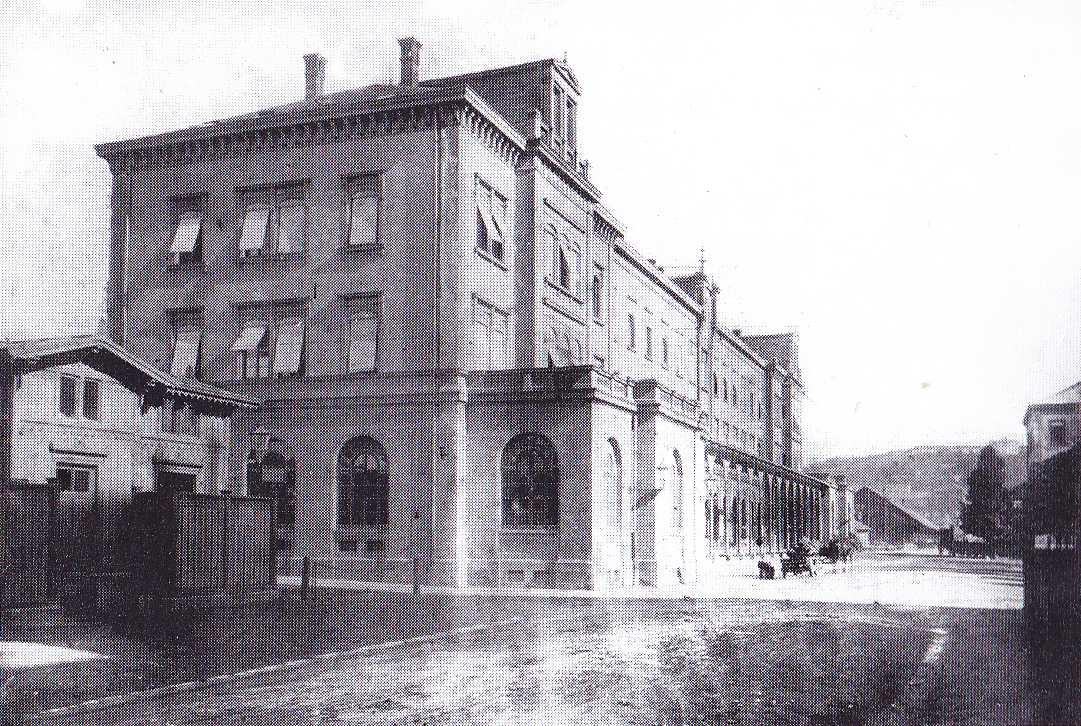
Ulm station in 1876 during the first phase

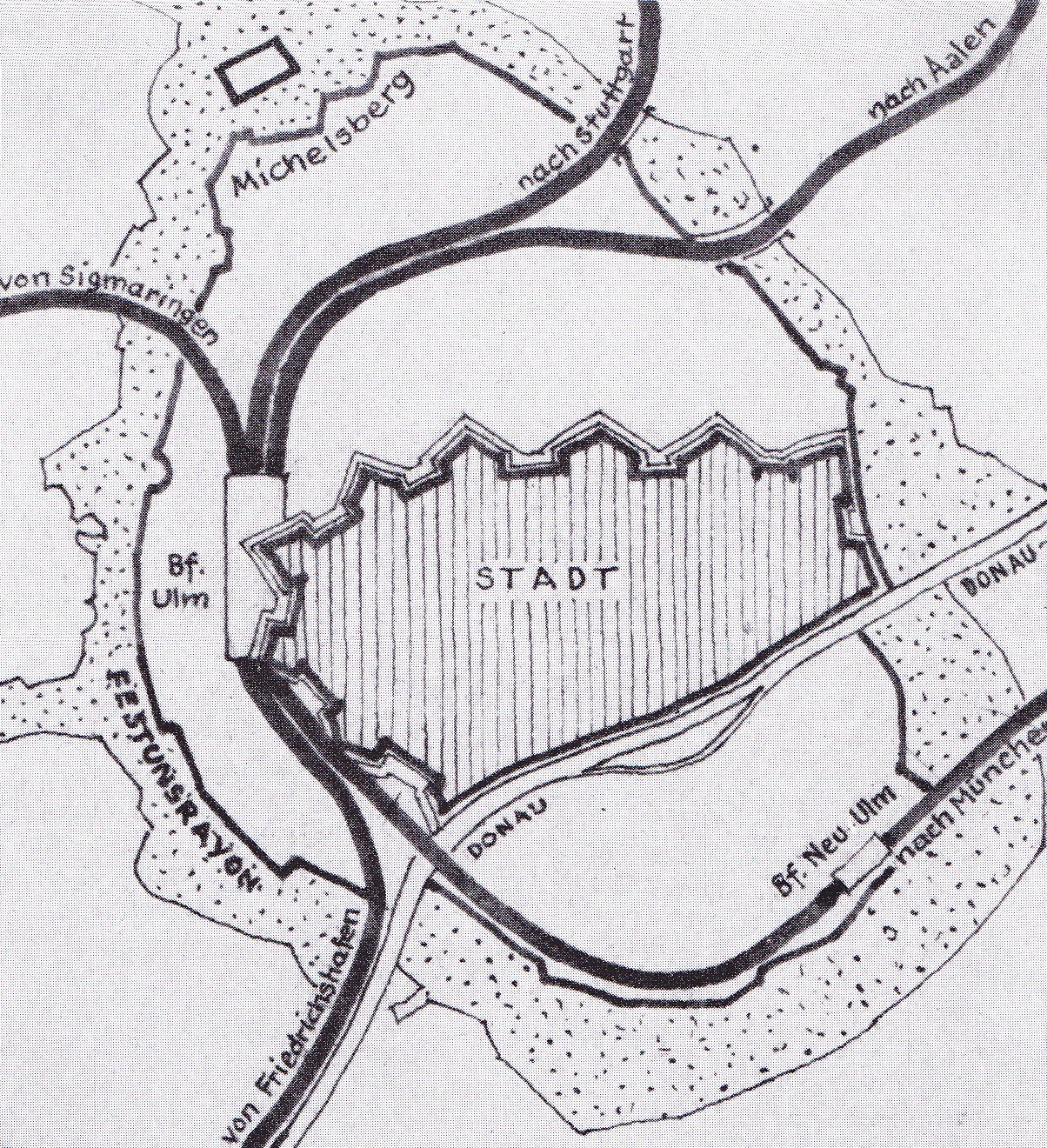
Map of railways in Ulm and Neu-Ulm

The station building was rebuilt from 1867 until 1880. This added cast iron arches and corner pavilions, so the building was now 75.2 metres long and 13.7 metres wide, and an iron, two-span train shed was established from 1872 to 1874. On 25 March 1867, construction of the line to Blaubeuren began with the demolition of the walls of the Fortress of Ulm at Kienlesberg (hill). The line to Blaubeuren was opened on 2 August 1868. This was followed by the extension to Ehingen in 1869 and to Scheer on the border of the Hohenzollern Province in 1870. Finally the Scheer–Sigmaringen section was opened in 1873. In 1874, following its completion, six trains ran daily from Ulm to Stuttgart, seven trains ran from Stuttgart to Ulm, five pairs of trains ran between Ulm and Friedrichshafen, six pairs of trains ran between Ulm and Augsburg, four pairs of trains between Ulm and Kempten and five pairs of trains ran between Ulm and Blaubeuren. From 1868 to 1871, the depot, which had been located to the west of the platforms was moved to the north into the triangle former between the Danube Valley Railway and Fils Valley Railway.

On 25 June 1875 the first trial run operated over the newly constructed Brenz Railway from Aalen via Heidenheim to Ulm and it was opened on 5 January 1876. An earlier opening was not possible due to the Brenz Railway clause of 21 February 1861, which pledged Württemberg not to build a rail link for twelve years between the Stuttgart–Nördlingen railway and Ulm, otherwise the route from Nördlingen to Lake Constance would have been shorter via Württemberg than via the Ludwig South-North Railway through Bavaria. On 24 January 1877, the footbridge that crossed the station and connected it to the Zum Russischen Hof hotel was completed; its construction had started in July 1875. In August 1877, the Blaubeurer-Tor bridge was opened across the tracks to the north of the station, replacing the existing Karlstraße level crossing. The bridge was an iron truss bridge, 225.6 metres long and ten metres wide. In October 1986, it was demolished and replaced by the Ludwig Erhard bridge opened on 26 October 1989. In 1879, the post office located next to the station, was rebuilt and extended. Ulm Stuttgarter Tor station, north of the inner city, which today is called Ulm Ost (east), opened on the Brenz Railway on 20 September 1886.

The second phase of expansion of the station began in 1888 and continued until 1891, involving the expenditure of 2.6 million German gold marks. The existing eastern storage sidings between Wilhelmstrasse and the Fils Valley Railway to the north-east of Ulm station, which still exist, were opened in 1888. On 26 March 1889, electric light was installed at the station, using electricity from the station’s own steam-powered, power plant on Schillerstraße. The station building was rebuilt again from 1889 to 1890. The cast-iron arches were replaced by a lobby that was 42 metres long and eight metres wide and was used for the ticket office. In 1891, the platform underpass was built, replacing the existing pedestrian level crossings. In the same year, at the end of the second construction phase, Ulm station had 22 tracks, four of which were used for passengers, five for freight and 13 for shunting.

=== 1891–1913: planning and construction of the marshalling yard ===
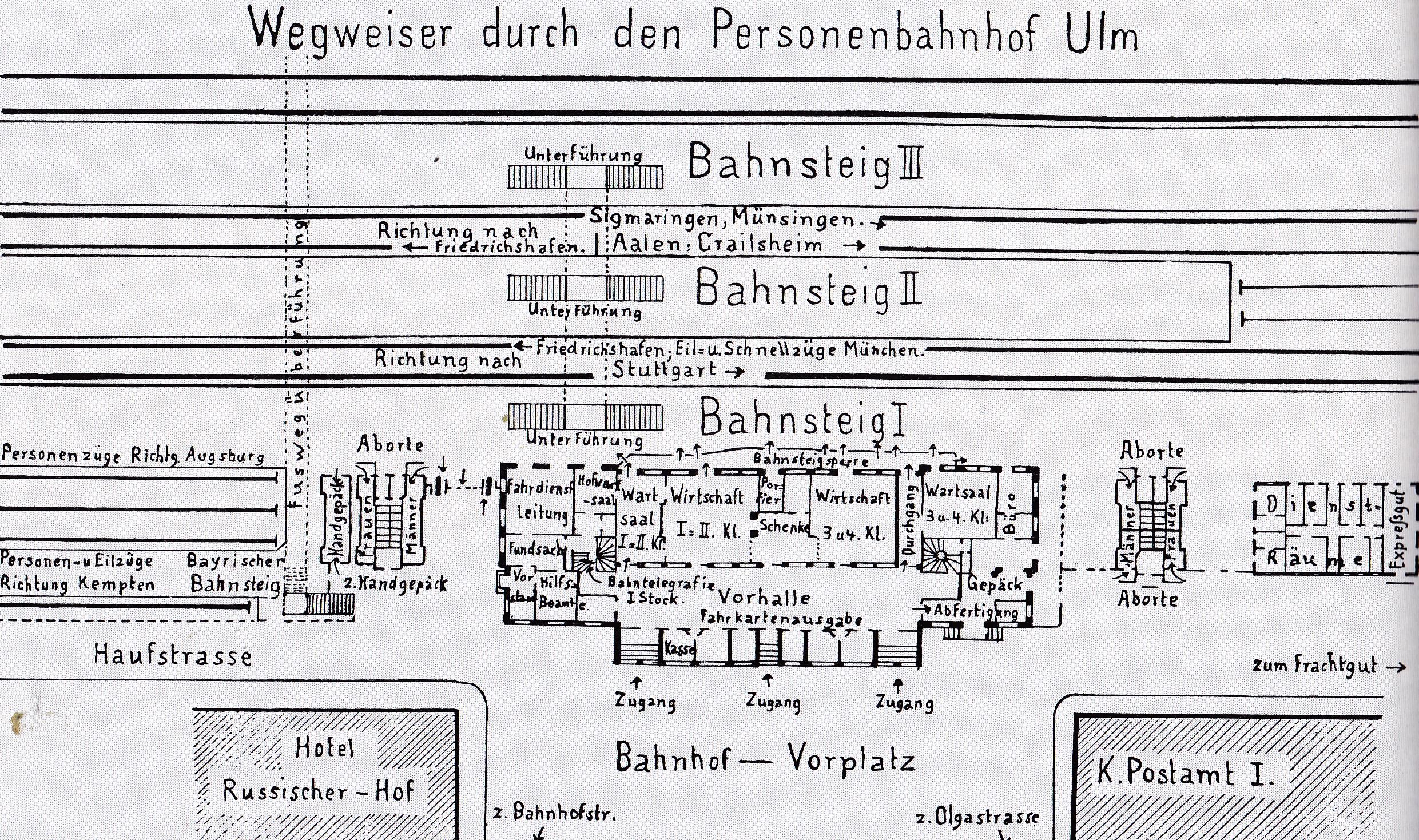
Station plan about 1890

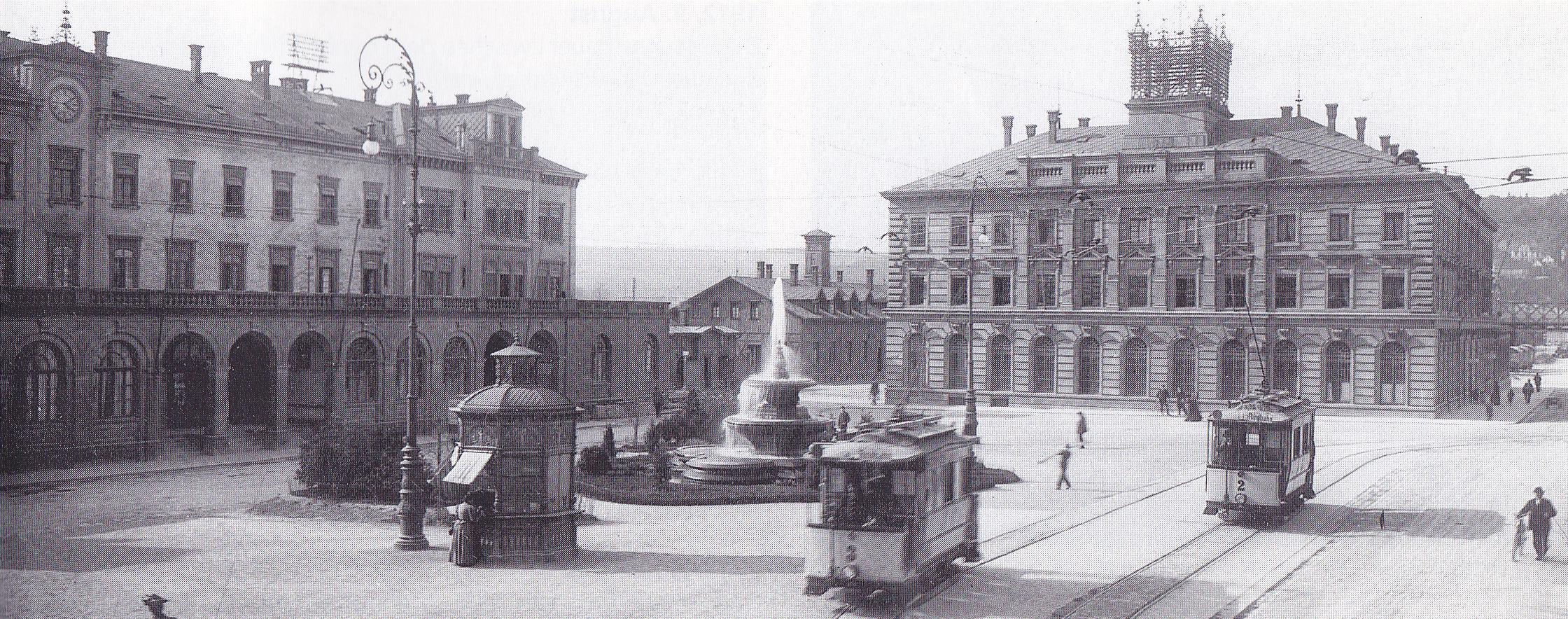
Forecourt with station building, main post office and fountain in 1904

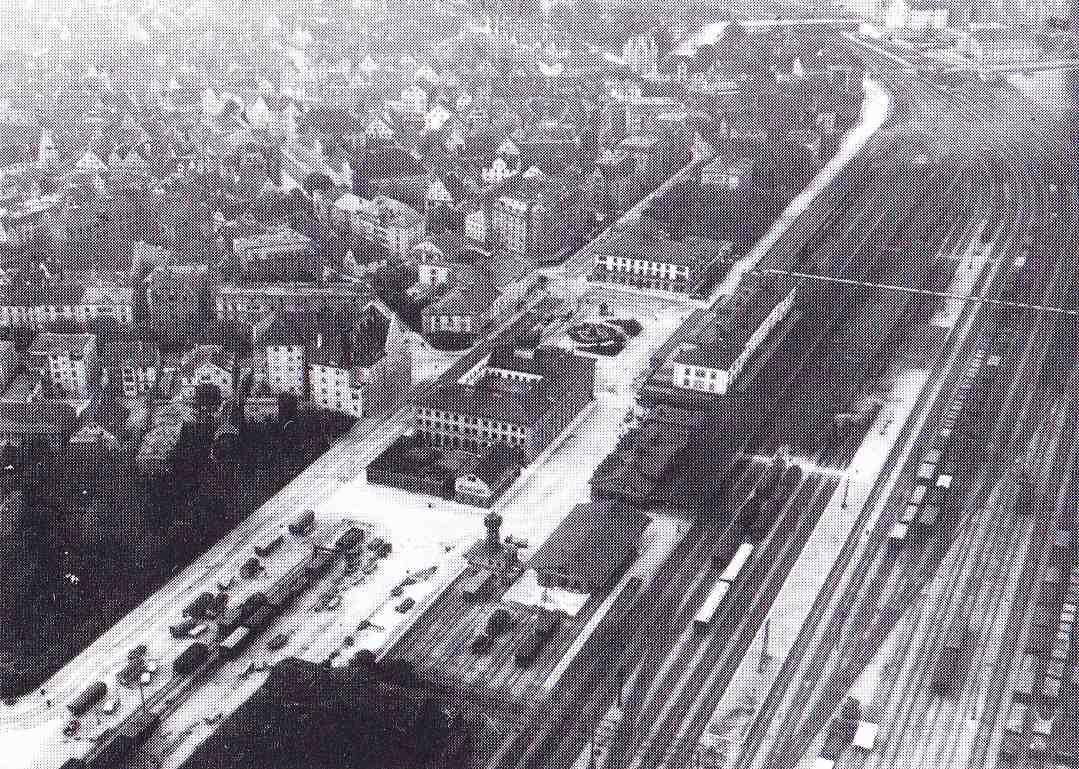
Aerial view of the station in 1905

On 1 August 1891, the Ulm general post office established a railway post office in the station forecourt. In March 1892, the duplication of the Maximilians Railway between Augsburg and Neu-Ulm was completed, so that the whole line between Munich and Stuttgart via Ulm was duplicated. On 1 October 1893, platform tickets were introduced for entry to the platforms. On 3 November 1894, the first petrol-powered railcar service ran from Ulm to Blaubeuren; it was powered by a Daimler-Otto engine from Maschinenfabrik Esslingen. On 27 April 1897, an Ordinarischiff (“ordinary boat”, a simple wooden boat, which could convey freight and passengers downstream only and was steered with poles) left Ulm for Vienna down the Danube for the last time, as they could no longer compete against the railway. On 15 May 1897, the Ulm tramway was opened, with the first line running through the station forecourt. In September 1898, a fountain with a crowned Atlas was erected in the forecourt; it was donated by the Schwenk Company, a local cement manufacturer. In one year from 1 April 1898 to 31 March 1899, Ulm station was used by 1,211,199 passengers and was the fourth busiest station in Württemberg. Ulm handled a total of 390,864 tons of freight, which placed it third in Württemberg.

In 1899 and 1900, the city of Ulm considered lowering the station by four metres in order to solve the traffic problems on the connections between the inner city and Western Ulm. This project was supported by several experts, but was not pursued because of its high cost of at least twelve million marks. Instead, a plan was developed in 1901 and 1902 to relocate the passenger station along with the planned marshalling yard to Blaubeurerstraße so that it was aligned east–west and to redevelop the former railway land. The lines to Augsburg and Friedrichshafen would be connected to the new railway station by a tunnel through the Kuhberg and New Ulm would be bypassed. A new South Station would be built on the new line in the Söflingen district near today's Königstraße. This project was also rejected by the administration of the State Railway due to its high cost.

The Münster Hotel was opened in 1901 as another station hotel on the station forecourt opposite the station building. The Mohrenkopf bridge, built in 1903 and 1904 over the southern station tracks, was completed on 1 October 1904; it was later renamed after the governor of the fortress, Rudolf von Zingler, as Zingler bridge. The city and the State Railway had disputed for years whether to build an overpass or an underpass. With the opening of the bridge, the level crossing on Ehinger Straße was closed. From March 1906, the city of Ulm planned an underpass under the tracks between Bahnhofstrasse in the east and Schillerstraße in the west of the station, which was never carried out.

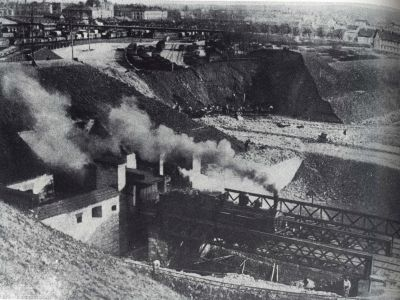
Steam locomotive in Blaubeurer Tor tunnel about 1905

Because the old freight handling facilities could not keep pace with rising freight traffic, a freight yard and marshalling yard situated to the east of Ulm station on the Danube Valley Railway was urgently needed. In 1899, the Royal Württemberg State Railways bought the 67,259 square metres of the fortress lands to use as its yard. On 25 September 1902, Württemberg King Wilhelm II granted the State Railway the right to expropriate the required land, so construction of the marshalling yard could begin in 1903. Operations began on a part of the new rail yard in October 1906. On 28 April 1907, the new Ulm-Söflingen station was opened on the Danube Valley Railway at the western end of the marshalling yard, replacing the previous Söflingen station opened in 1868. The Neutor bridge crossing the Fils Valley and the Brenz Railways to the north of Ulm station was completed in July 1907. It was 112 metres long, 11.6 metres wide and weighed 600 tons. While the iron structures and pillars were built by the State Railways, the roadway was built by the city of Ulm. The first ticket machine was installed in the station vestibule on 7 January 1908. The Bahnhofsmission (a charity that assists with various social problems at German stations) was established in Ulm in the late summer of 1910. The railway yard was completed on 12 June 1911 and Ulm station was renamed Ulm Hauptbahnhof (Ulm main station). Duplication of the Danube Valley Railway from Ulm to Söflingen was completed on 19 March 1912 and duplication of the Southern Railway from Ulm to Friedrichshafen, begun in 1905, was completed in 1913.

Industrial tracks were required to connect the yard to the industrial and commercial areas to the east and west of the city. In 1907, the 3.8 kilometre-long Ulm-West industrial tracks were built and the five main tracks were connected to the premises of 40 companies. The 1.3 kilometre-long Ulm-Ost (east) industrial tracks, which had been proposed in 1897, were built from 1910 to 1911, and stayed in operation until 9 May 1979, when they were closed and later dismantled.

=== 1914–1939: World War I and electrification ===
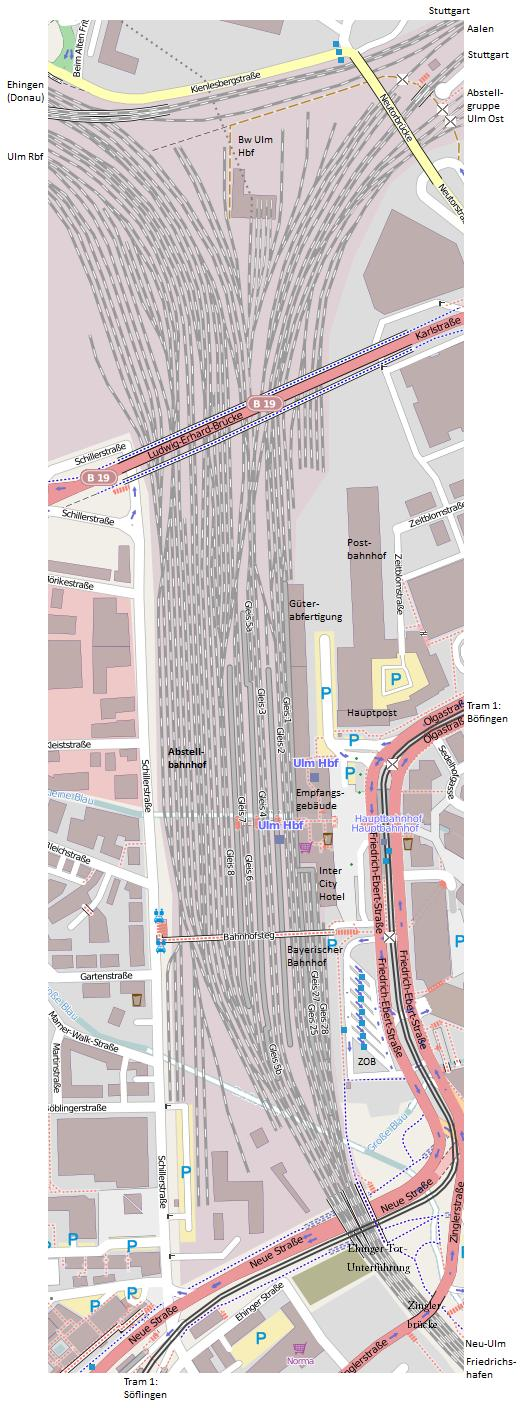
Map of Ulm station

In the First World War from 1914 to 1918, troops, military supplies, prisoners of war and cars were transported through the station. Passenger services on all lines in Württemberg were closed due to lack of coal on 19 October and from 5 to 15 November 1919 for the first time. On 1 April 1920, the Royal Württemberg State Railways and all the other German state railways were absorbed into Deutsche Reichsbahn. In January and February 1922, there were again restrictions on rail traffic due to lack of coal and strikes. In 1923, the station forecourt was redesigned. From July 1930, the D 208 express made the fastest train run in Württemberg, taking 78 minutes over the 104 kilometre route from Ulm to Friedrichshafen.

In September 1931, for the electrification of the railway line from Stuttgart to Augsburg via Ulm, the tracks are lowered below the Zingler, Neutor and Wallgraben bridges as the minimum clearance height had to be increased by 1.2 metres for the installation of the overhead line. In the same month the double-track tunnel on the Fils Valley Railway that had previously passed under the fortress wall had its roof removed. Ulm Ost (east) station was established at one of the old tunnel portals in April 1932. The station footbridge from the station forecourt to Schillerstraße had to be raised in February 1932 by 1.2 metres for the installation of the overhead line. In April 1933, the station building was replastered to prepare for the official inauguration of the electrification. On 25 April 1933, the electrification of the Maximilian’s Railway from Augsburg to Ulm was inaugurated and passenger train 906 hauled by locomotive E 32 31 operated as the first electric train from Augsburg to Ulm. On 5 May 1933, electrification was inaugurated on the Fils Valley Railway from Stuttgart to Ulm with the arrival of the first electric train from Stuttgart. The official inauguration of the electrification of the whole railway line from Stuttgart to Augsburg, however, was only held on 30 May 1933. The Blaubeurer-Tor Bridge to the north of the station, built in 1877, was demolished in June 1932 and replaced with a new steel bridge, which was opened on 13 July 1933. It was the largest bridge in Ulm with a length of 226 metres, a width of 17.7 metres and a weight of 1600 tons.

On 10 November 1933, test runs were conducted on the 86-kilometre Augsburg–Ulm route and on the 71-kilometer section of the Fils Valley Railway from Ulm to Plochingen, the two sections of the line that were completed, each at speeds of up to 152 km/h, in 54 minutes. In January 1935, test runs on the Stuttgart–Ulm railway were carried out with the first new unit AC electric multiple units, which reached 100 km/h instead of the normal 35 km/h on the Geislinger Steige and as a result the Fils Valley Railway was covered in an hour without stopping. In 1937, duplication started on the Söflingen–Herrlingen section of the Danube Valley Railway, which was completed in the 1939. From 1 November 1937 to 31 March 1941, a Deutsche Reichsbahn express bus ran from Stuttgart to Ulm on the new autobahn. On 17 December 1938, the renovation work at the station building, which had been started in the summer, was finished. The third class restaurant was replaced by a 13-metre-wide passage to the platforms and the second class restaurant was rebuilt as a toilet block. On 14 April 1939, under an order issued by the Ministry of Transport in 1936, the Bahnhofsmission was replaced by the station services of the National Socialist Women's League.

=== 1939–1949: destruction in the Second World War and reconstruction ===
After the start of World War II on 1 September 1939, Ulm Jews were “deported” for the first time on 1 December 1941. By February 1945, Deutsche Reichsbahn had transported 116 Ulm Jews to the concentration camps in seven deportations, with most of them being sent to the Theresienstadt concentration camp. Private rail travel became less and less tolerated from 23 March 1942. On 16 March 1944, the first air raid was carried out on Ulm station, inflicting damage in the southern part of the station and killing two railway employees. This was followed by other attacks in the months of July, August and September, but did not lead to the cessation of railway operations. On 17 December 1944, the heaviest air raid on Ulm was carried out with the dropping of 65 explosive and about 3,500 incendiary bombs on the railway. As a result, all the tracks, the station building of 1850 and all the outbuildings were destroyed so that train operations were not possible and all operations had to be moved to the marshalling yard. All passenger operations were restored by 9 January 1945. On 25 February 1945 there was another air raid on the station, which destroyed the Wallstraßen bridge, and eight more followed up to 19 April. On 19 April 1945, the next major air raid took place on the station and marshalling yard, which led to the complete cessation of operations. On 23 April 1945, railway staff left all pars of the station and went to Laupheim. On 24 April 1945, the railway bridge over the Danube between Ulm and Neu-Ulm was blown up during the invasion by the United States Army. All objects that the United States Air Force had previously targeted for destruction had been destroyed.

In May 1945, a temporary wooden bridge was built across the Danube, replacing the demolished railway bridge. That same month, a Christian aid station was established in a temporary shed at the station and it handled a daily average of 3000 travellers until mid-1946. A total of 28,200 people stayed at the shed from April 1949 until the middle of December 1952, when it was demolished. On 16 May 1945, the first military trains ran again for the French and Americans between Friedrichshafen and Ulm and on 8 June 1945, Deutsche Reichsbahn operated on the line from Kornwestheim via Stuttgart and Ulm to Augsburg. From 29 June, electric trains could operate from Ulm to Neu-Ulm, but, on 30 June, civilian travel between the French and the American occupation zones was forbidden, affecting, among other lines, the Southern Railway. On 21 August 1945, 24 passenger trains ran daily via Ulm Hauptbahnhof, most of them serving the occupying authorities and military. On 3 September, civilian freight traffic resumed. On 19 December 1945, private passenger services were briefly discontinued due to a coal shortage so that vital food shipments could continue and, on 1 April 1946 after the resumption of services, fares were increased by 150 percent. On 29 April, the Ulm yard was reopened along with the platform subway at the station. From 1945 to 1959, as a result of its location as the last town before the border between the American and French occupation zones and being a major transportation hub, Ulm was the main place in Southern Germany for storing rolling stock. Between 1945 and 1948, well over 200,000 war veterans and 300,000 refugees from Eastern Europe travelled through Ulm station.

From 18 May 1946, Bahnhofstraße was opened to traffic again after being cleared of debris. In the summer timetable of 1946, Ulm was served by 60 passenger trains a day and, from 16 June 1946, through trains ran over the whole length of the Stuttgart–Ulm railway. Deutsche Reichsbahn built, from October to December 1946, a shed that served as the station restaurant behind the temporary shed that served as the station building in the station forecourt. Here the bricks of the war-damaged Zum Russischen Hof hotel were used as a building material. In 1947, the city of Ulm made plans to move the station, but they failed. It managed, however, to prevent the Reichsbahn’s planned extension of the railway facilities to the east. In March 1947, the Bahnhofhotel-Gaststätte (Station hotel-restaurant), which was housed in a makeshift building, opened as a replacement for the destroyed Bahnhofshotel (Station Hotel). In the same month the Ulm rubble railway (Trümmerbahn), operated with a steam locomotive, was put into service between the inner city and Friedrichsau, hauling 1.2 million cubic metres of rubble to the treatment plants before it was closed on 31 March 1955. In April 1948, the ruins of the general post office were cleared from the station forecourt and a shed for the post office was built up to 12 December 1948 on an unused loading track. On 23 May 1949, the platform footbridge that had been completed in 1877 was demolished. This had been damaged at the end of the war and was difficult, but still passable. Initially it was intended to replace it by extending the platform underpass to Schillerstraße on the west side of the tracks. The plan was abandoned in favour of a new platform footbridge.

=== 1949–1981: new construction and expansion of the reception building ===
On 7 September 1949, Deutsche Bundesbahn was founded as the successor of Deutsche Reichsbahn in the territory of the Federal Republic of Germany. In October 1949, the wooden beams of the temporary bridge over the Danube River built in 1945 were replaced with steel beams. On 7 November 1950, the new Bundesbahn Hotel (called Bubaho by the people of the city) with 130 rooms was opened after a construction period of 18 months. In 1950, Ulm Hauptbahnhof sold 1.16 million tickets. On 6 April 1951, a radio system for controlling shunting was commissioned in Ulm station. On 21 March 1952, a Railroad Transportation Office was established for U.S. soldiers. In December 1952, the temporary sheds on the station were demolished so that construction of the new station building could begin. On 19 December 1953, Deutsche Bundesbahn employees moved into the new station building. In 1955, the freight processing and loading facilities were rebuilt. On 16 May 1955, the new general post office was completed in the station forecourt; its construction had begun on 6 October 1952 and it would be opened on 9 July 1955. Construction of the station pedestrian bridge, which had begun in 1954, was completed on the 5 August 1955. After the Hungarian Revolution was put down, the station handled trains carrying Hungarian refugees for several weeks from 30 November 1956. The construction of the railway bridge over the Danube, which had begun on 24 November 1955, was opened on 31 October 1957. The bridge over the Danube handled 160 trains per day at this time and was one of the busiest bridges in southern Germany.

The Bahnhofhotel-Gaststätte hotel, built in 1947, was demolished in April 1959 so that it could be replaced by the Bundesbahnhotel. On 28 July 1960, the Ulm city council decided to build a road tunnel to the south of Ulm station (the Ehinger-Tor underpass) and the Zingler bridge a little further to the south. Ulm postal station opened on 13 October 1962 for the loading and unloading of the post. The final stage of the entrance building began on 11 January 1964 with the extension of the north wing, which was to last two years. However, the construction work stopped in April due to financial and structural problems. After lying to the south of the station, Ulm Central Bus Station was taken into operation provisionally on 22 December 1961; it would be finally completed in September 1964. Because of its high traffic density Ulm station was classified on 1 July 1966 as belonging to the highest level of Deutsche Bundesbahn’s station categories, category 1. The interior of the entrance building was renovated in December 1966. Construction of Neuen Straße (new street), including the Ehinger-Tor underpass, to the south of the station was completed on 22 September 1966; its construction had started in November 1964. The Ulm tramway that used to run over the Zingler bridge was transferred to run through the underpass, with services starting on 29 May 1967.

In January 1968, the old Zingler bridge to the south of the station was demolished for the construction of the new Zingler bridge, opened on 5 December 1968. Extension work on the north wing of the station building, which had been abandoned in 1964, was resumed in September 1969, but, it was stopped again due to financial problems on 7 May 1971. In June 1970, unused sheds were demolished for facilities to handle baggage. On 26 August 1969, construction began on a pedestrian underpass under the station forecourt, for which the channel of the Kleine Blau (Little Blau) under the station had to be moved. In October 1970, the remains of fortifications from the 14th and 16th century were discovered. On 21 December 1970 the underpass, which connects the station with the city centre and the tram and bus station, was opened.

Work began on 18 August 1971 to enlarge the station building to increase the number of beds in the Bundesbahn hotel for the 1972 Summer Olympics held in Munich. This was completed on 7 July 1972. In September 1971, the construction work on the northern part of the entrance building resumed again following complaints by the railway workers' union and the north wing was completed in February 1973. The platform barriers were abolished on 1 May 1973. On 16 May 1976, at 11:15, the last steam-hauled passenger train left the station for Sigmaringen. In February 1978, platforms 1 to 3 were raised from 38 centimetres to 76 centimetres, platform 3 was extended to 320 metres and a fourth platform was built, requiring the platform underpass to be extended.

Deutsche Bundesbahn modernised the Fils Valley Railway between Stuttgart and Ulm up to 12 October 1981, introducing reversible working of the tracks.

=== Since 1982: planning of high-speed lines and modernisation ===
In July 1985, Deutsche Bundesbahn began planning a high-speed line from Stuttgart to Munich. A new line was planned from Süßen to Günzburg to bypass Ulm to the north; it would have connected with the existing line in Beimerstetten. These plans, however, met with strong opposition from the residents of Ulm and Neu-Ulm, as the transfer of the main station and the freight yard to the new line to the north of Ulm in the suburb of Jungingen was proposed. On 15 October 1990, Deutsche Bundesbahn said, however, that the realisation of the Ulm bypass was unlikely and, on 7 September 1993, it finally decided not to implement the Ulm bypass. In October 1991, a further variant of the high-speed line between Stuttgart and Ulm was proposed. Besides the previous version, which was now called the K route, and that line with the Ulm bypass omitted, there was the H route, which was a new line for long-distance traffic from Stuttgart Hauptbahnhof via the Swabian Alb to Ulm Hauptbahnhof, running parallel to the A 8 autobahn; the Fils Valley Railway would continue to serve regional and freight traffic. On 8 December 1992, the Deutsche Bundesbahn board approved the selection of the H route.

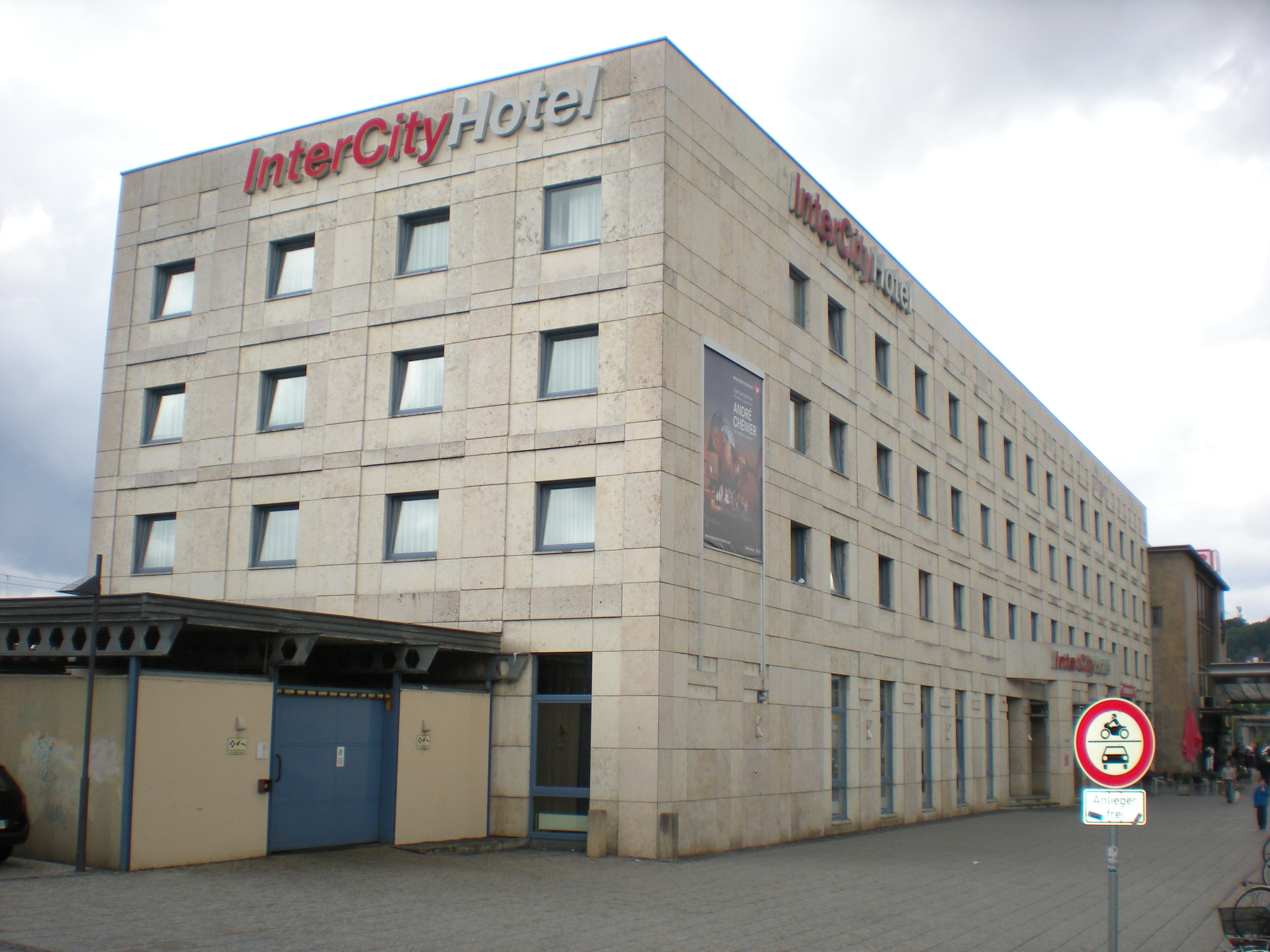
InterCity Hotel in 2012

From May 1986, Deutsche Bundesbahn planned to relocate the central bus station underground and redevelop the space vacated with an office complex. On 21 January 1992, the city of Ulm approved these plans. On 25 September 1986, a baggage conveyor belt on the stairs of the platform tunnels was placed in operation. For the commencement of Intercity-Express services in 1991, the old Bundesbahn Hotel (which since 1982 had been called the InterCity Hotel) was demolished in April 1991 and a new InterCity Hotel was built by 1992 and opened on 1 September 1992. A passenger information system with a computer-controlled display of rail services was put into operation in the station on 22 October 1992. A trial of the new tilting Pendolino (class 610) trains ran between Stuttgart and Ulm on 11 December 1993. The station forecourt was redesigned and a glass roof was built over the main entrance by 4 December 1993.

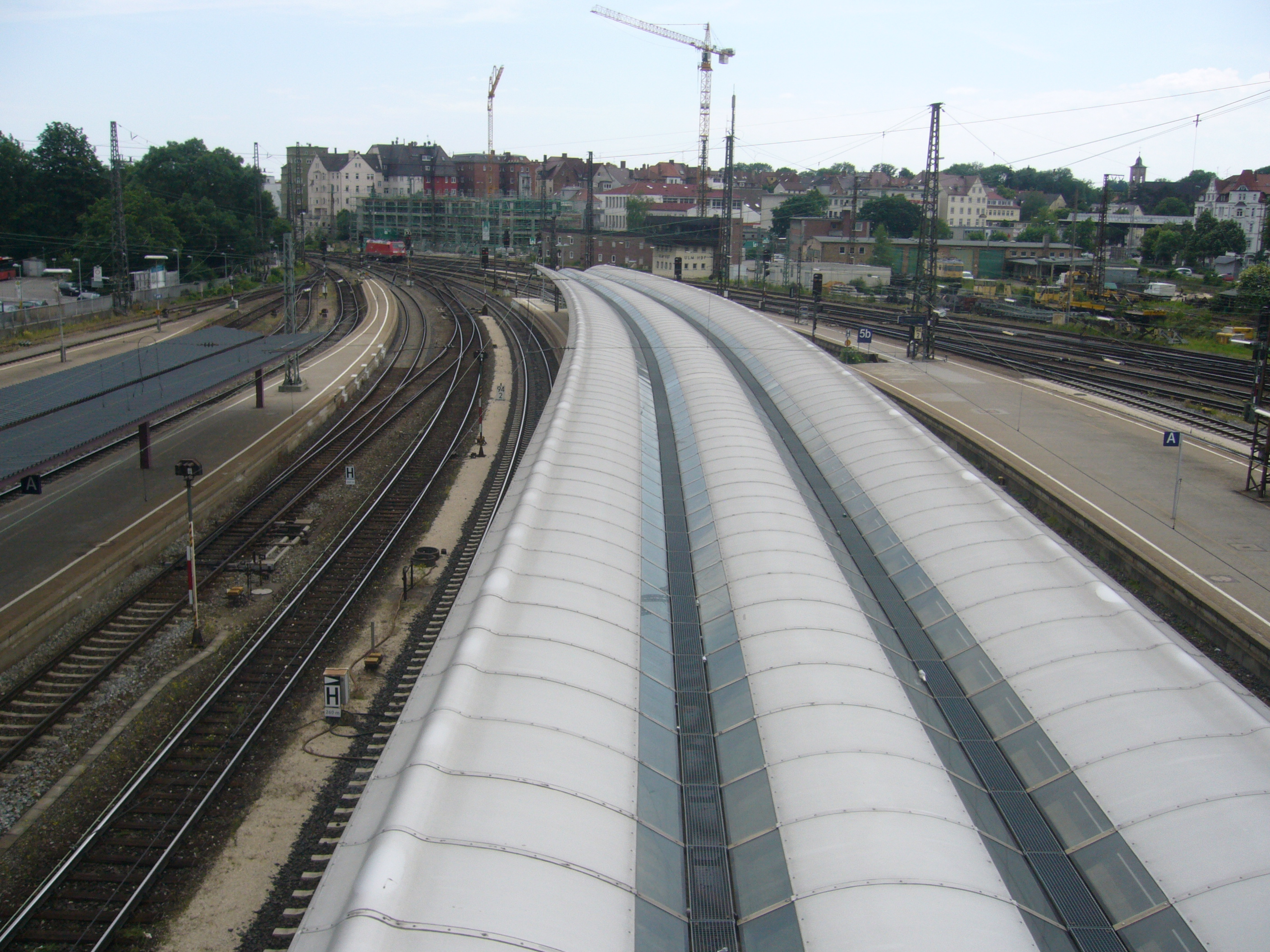
New roof of platform B (view from the new station footbridge)

On 1 January 1994, Deutsche Bahn AG was established as the successor of the Deutsche Bundesbahn and the East German railways (Deutsche Reichsbahn). On 29 November 1994, Deutsche Bahn opened a new travel centre at Ulm station and, on 8 April 1995, Ulm station became the first station in Baden-Württemberg to have tactile paving to guide the blind. From 28 May, some regional trains ran between Stuttgart and Ulm with double-deck coaches. In August 1995, the bicycle parking facilities at the station were covered. On 31 December 1997 the handling of freight was closed and the platforms for postal operated closed on 23 January 1998. Class 610 tilting trains took over scheduled operations of regional services on the Danube Valley Railway between Ulm and Sigmaringen from 24 May 1998. Construction work, including installation of a new glass roof, began on platform B with platform tracks 2 and 3 in March 2000 and it was completed in August 1998.

In 2005, the Ulm container terminal (Ulm Umschlagbahnhof or Ulm Ubf) was opened on the Fils Valley Railway on the northern border of the city of Ulm at Dornstadt with four 700 metre-long tracks, where up to 100,000 TEUs can be handled each year, making it one of the eleven yards serving unit trains in hub and spoke operations in Germany. The old station footbridge was demolished in 2008 and replaced by a new structure, which was completed in summer 2011.

== Structure ==
=== Station building ===
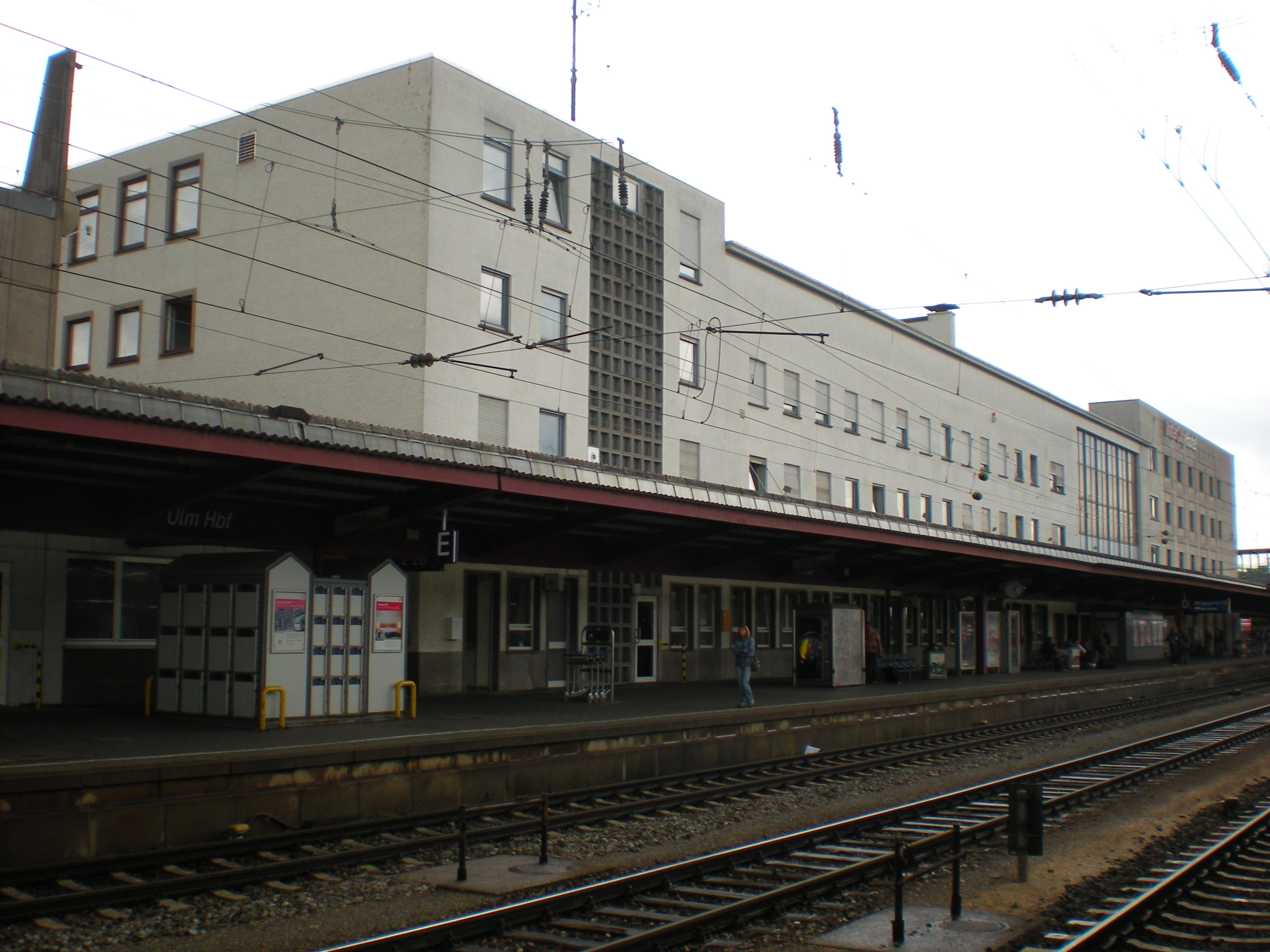
The station building from the track side

Located to the east of the tracks is a four-storey entrance building, which is divided into the Intercity Hotel in the south, the central part with the entrance hall and the north wing.

In December 1952, after the Second World War, work began on erecting makeshift huts on the station destroyed in the war so that construction of the permanent station building could commence. Deutsche Bundesbahn opened the new station building on 19 December 1953 after twelve months of construction. Many citizens of Ulm were unhappy with the station building and the simultaneous restructuring of the station area; Carl Ebner, the first chairman of the Tourist Office of Ulm/Neu-Ulm, called it "the biggest train wreck of Ulm". On 11 January 1964, the final stage of building the station began with the extension of the north wing, which was to last two years. However, the construction work ended in April due to financial and structural problems. In September 1969, the development work was resumed on the north wing, but it was stopped again on 7 May 1971 due to further financial problems. On 18 August 1971, the upgrade of the station building began in order to increase the number of beds of the Deutsche Bundesbahn Hotel for the 1972 Summer Olympics held in Munich. This was completed on 7 July 1972. In September 1971, the construction on the northern part of the entrance building resumed because of complaints from the railway workers' union and in February 1973, the north wing was completed with offices and a canteen. From 22 October 1973 to 5 December 1974, the station building was rebuilt in order to move the baggage storage and handling into the main hall. In May 1978, Deutsche Bundesbahn opened a tourist office in the entrance building and on 22 October 1992, it put a computerised departure board with a split-flap display into operation in the station. Deutsche Bahn opened the concourse on 29 November 1994 and a new travel centre on 20 March 1996 equipped with a “Service Point”, using new technology.

In the lobby of the building there is a large two-piece LCD departures board and the stairs to the platform underpass. To the south of the entrance hall the Markt im Bahnhof (market in the station) was opened on 1 September 1992 with a variety of shops. The main entrance to the lobby is almost entirely glazed and the area outside the main entrance in the station forecourt was covered by a glass roof extending into the road on 4 September 1993. Under the glass roof are the stairs to the underpass that connects the station with the tram and bus station and the city centre. Directly adjoining to the entrance to the north wing there are more shops, the travel centre and a connection to the former freight shed. The InterCity Hotel with 135 rooms opened on 1 September 1992 as a replacement for the old Deutsche Bundesbahn Hotel, which was demolished in April 1991 and stood on the same site.

Since October 2024, the station building is closed for renovation. The reconstruction works are planned to be completed at the end of 2026, with the reopening of the renovated building scheduled for the beginning of 2027. In October 2026, it was announced that the reopening will take place at an undefined date after Easter 2027.

=== Platforms and platform tracks ===
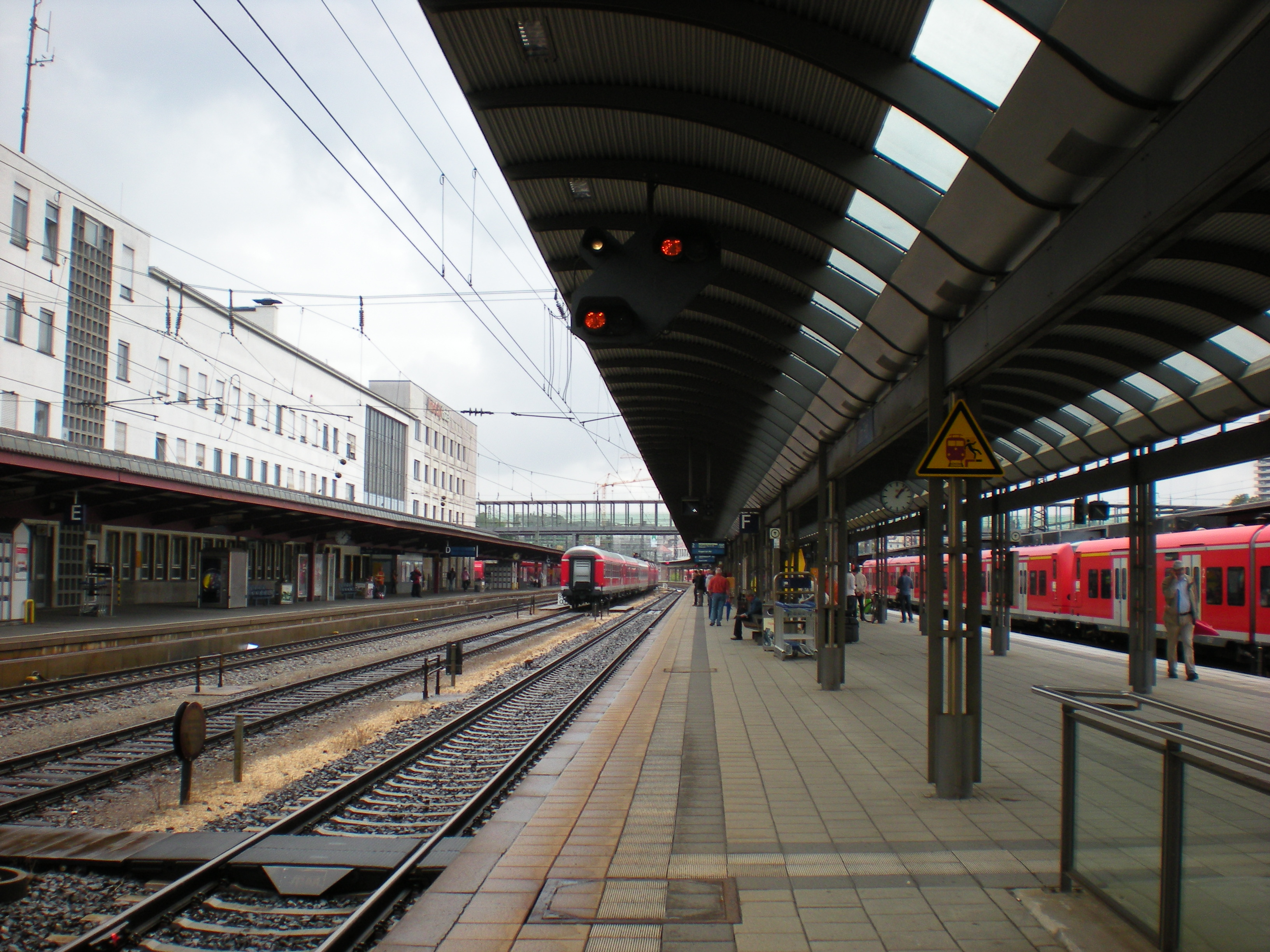
Platforms

The station has seven platform tracks on four platforms and five bay platforms, with track 1 next to the station building. Two bay platforms, 5a in the north and 5b in the south, are on the middle platform, which is bordered by tracks 4 and 6. Bay platforms 25, 26, 27, 28, and 29 were originally part of the Bayerischer Bahnhof (Bavaria station), located to the south of the entrance building and west of the bus station, and are used by regional trains to Bavaria. Tracks 26 and 29 have no platform and serve as sidings. Between tracks 1 and 2 is track 21, which has no platform and is used as a through track for freight trains and as a siding. Deutsche Bahn divides some platform tracks into “north” and “south” sections, so that two trains can stop at the same time on the track. All platforms are covered and have digital destination displays. The central platforms are connected by an underpass to the station building. Further north there is an underpass that connects the main platform with the central platforms, which is accessible for the disabled with ramps. This does not continue to the platform facing tracks 7 and 8, so they do not have barrier free access. Since May 2019, there have been stairs and lifts to the footbridge over the tracks. The footbridge connects Bahnhofplatz to Schillerstraße and allows barrier-free access to all platforms.

Platforms	Length in m	Height in cm	Use
1	499	76	Long-distance towards Stuttgart, Regionalbahn services to Geislingen
2	408	76	Long-distance towards Munich and a few trains towards Weißenhorn
3	446	76	Intercity train pair: Münster–Innsbruck, regional services towards Stuttgart, Friedrichshafen, Biberach and Weißenhorn
4	322	76	Intercity train pair: Hannover–Oberstdorf, Regionalbahn services towards Biberach; Platform 4 north: Regional services towards Stuttgart, Aalen and Munderkingen; Platform 4 south: Regional services towards Memmingen, Kempten and Oberstdorf
5a	107	76	Regional services towards Aalen and Munderkingen
5b	109	76	Regionalbahn services towards Memmingen, Weißenhorn or Illertissen
6	461	76	Regionalbahn services towards Langenau; Platform 6 north: Regional services towards Munderkingen and Aalen; Platform 6 south: Regional services towards Biberach, Friedrichshafen, Memmingen and Weißenhorn
7	335	76	Regional services towards Donaueschingen, Langenau, Memmingen and Weißenhorn
8	335	76	Regional services towards Munderkingen, Biberach, Friedrichshafen, Memmingen and Weißenhorn
25	236	76	Regional services towards Munich
27	186	38	Regional services towards Ingolstadt and Munich
28	158	38	Regional services towards Ingolstadt and Krumbach

== Rail operations ==
=== History of rail services ===
Ulm Hauptbahnhof has always been an important hub for long-distance and regional services. At its opening in 1850, three pairs of trains per day ran from Ulm to Stuttgart and to Friedrichshafen. The travel time between Ulm and Stuttgart was four hours and between Ulm and Friedrichshafen it was three hours and 15 minutes. After the first opening of the Bavarian Maximilian Railway in June 1854, four pairs of trains also ran between Ulm and Munich, with express trains taking three hours 30 minutes and stopping trains taking five to six hours. In the summer timetable of 1860, Ulm was first served by a scheduled night train and in 1865 a night train ran from Vienna to Paris, stopping at Ulm station. From 1862, four pairs of trains operated on the newly opened Iller Valley Railway between Ulm and Kempten. On 15 May 1867, an express service was established on the Paris–Ulm–Vienna route, which took 19 hours and ten minutes from Ulm to Paris and 16 hours and 35 minutes from Ulm to Vienna. In 1874, six trains ran daily from Ulm to Stuttgart, seven trains ran from Stuttgart to Ulm, five train pairs ran between Ulm and Friedrichshafen, six pairs of trains ran between Ulm and Augsburg, four pairs of trains ran between Ulm and Kempten and five pairs of trains ran between Ulm and Blaubeuren. On 5 June 1883, the first Orient Express from Paris to Constantinople stopped in Ulm at 11:35 after leaving Paris Gare de l'Est at 19:36 on the previous day. The train operated on Wednesdays and Saturdays to Ulm and had a running time of 78 hours from Paris to Varna. The connection from Varna to Constantinople was by ship. At the beginning of World War I, the operation of the Orient Express was closed. As a replacement, the Balkan Express was established from Strasbourg to Constantinople on 15 January 1916, but this was shortened in June 1917, due to weak demand, to the Munich–Constantinople route and thus no longer served Ulm. From July 1930, the D 208 corridor express ran as the fastest Württemberg train on the 104 kilometre Ulm-Friedrichshafen route in 78 minutes.

During World War II, train traffic was severely restricted, and after some air raids stopped running altogether. Services resumed after the end of World War II and 24 passenger trains stopped at Ulm station on 21 August 1945. On 28 May 1967, the station became part of the Trans-Europ-Express network, which had been established in 1957 and only had first class accommodation. From 28 May 1967, the TEE Rembrandt from Amsterdam to Munich and the Rheinpfeil from Dortmund to Munich, with coaches from Amsterdam, stopped at Ulm. On 26 September 1971, Intercity services were introduced, stopping every two hours at the station. Until 1979, Ulm was served by first class only services on line 1 of the intercity network, running between Hamburg-Altona and Munich, although, unlike most other cities served by Intercity trains, it had less than 100,000 inhabitants. The Rheinpfeil lost its TEE status and was integrated into Intercity line 1. With the summer timetable introduced on 27 May 1979, Intercity trains ran every hour and now had first and second class carriages. On 28 May 1983, the TEE Rembrandt service was shortened to Stuttgart, meaning that it no longer stopped at Ulm. In December 1985, a portion of the TEE Rheingold that had run from Amsterdam to Munich and Salzburg via Aalen and Donauwörth since May 1982 was rerouted via Ulm, but on 30 May 1987, it was abolished. On 2 June 1991, Deutsche Bundesbahn introduced the Intercity-Express into traffic, with the hourly Intercity route from Hamburg-Altona via Hannover, Frankfurt and Stuttgart to Munich replaced by the new ICE trains. In a controversial move, it was decided to stop the ICE in Ulm.

Passenger services to Laupheim town, branching off the Southern Railway at Laupheim West on the Laupheim–Schwendi railway, which were closed in 1983, resumed on 30 May 1999 as an hourly Regionalbahn service from Langenau via Ulm to Laupheim town or Biberach (Riss), with regional shuttles using class 650 diesel railcars. Interregio-Express (IRE) line 26 from Saarbrücken via Mannheim, Stuttgart, Ulm and Friedrichshafen to Lindau, running every two hours, opened in 1990, was reinstated on 15 December 2002 and an additional IRE service, also running every two hours, ran on the Stuttgart–Ulm–Lindau section of the route. Later, the IRE network was further expanded.

=== Long distance services ===
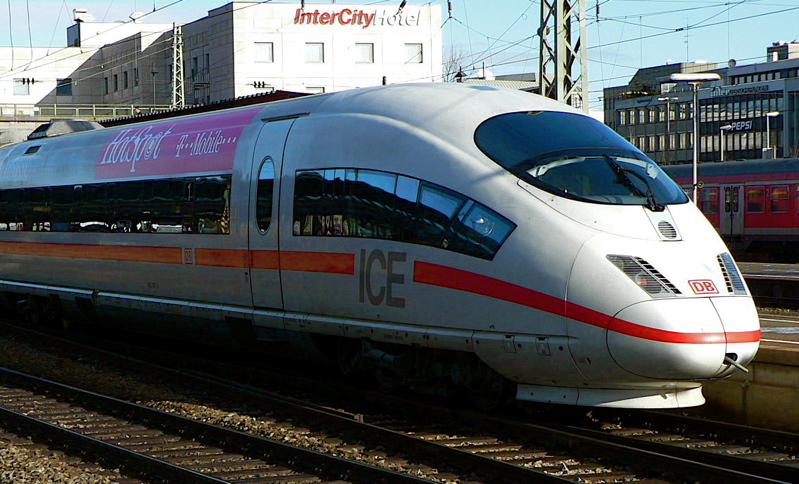
ICE 3 in Ulm

In 2012, Ulm Hauptbahnhof is served at least hourly by Intercity-Express, Intercity and Euro City trains. The two ICE routes, 11 and 42, run every two hours, so together an hourly service is provided. Route 11 is operated with ICE 1 sets with seven pairs of trains running between Berlin Ostbahnhof and Munich and one between Hamburg-Altona and Munich. Route 42 is served with ICE 3 trains and connects the Ruhr region with Munich via Frankfurt. It is operated with six pairs of trains from Dortmund to Munich, one from Münster and Hamm to Munich, which is coupled to another set in Dortmund and a pair of trains from Hamburg-Altona to Munich. TGV route 83 runs with a pair of trains daily between Munich and Paris using TGV POS sets.

In the 2026 timetable, the following long-distance services stopped at the station:

Line	Route			Frequency
ICE 11	Munich – Augsburg – Ulm – Stuttgart – Mannheim – Frankfurt – Erfurt – Leipzig – Berlin – Berlin Gesundbrunnen			Every 2 hours
ICE 42	Munich – Augsburg – Ulm – Stuttgart – Mannheim – Wiesbaden	– Cologne		every 2 hours one train pair
ICE 42	Munich – Augsburg – Ulm – Stuttgart – Mannheim – Wiesbaden	– Köln Messe/Deutz – Düsseldorf		every 2 hours one train pair
ICE 47	Dortmund – Essen – Duisburg – Cologne – Frankfurt Airport – Mannheim – Stuttgart – Ulm – Augsburg – Munich-Pasing – Munich			every 2 hours
ICE 48	Munich – Augsburg – Ulm – Stuttgart – Heidelberg – Darmstadt	– Frankfurt		every 2 hours one train pair
ICE 48	Munich – Augsburg – Ulm – Stuttgart – Heidelberg – Darmstadt	– Frankfurt Airport – Cologne – Düsseldorf – Dortmund	– Bielefeld – Hannover – Brandenburg – Berlin Ostbahnhof	every 2 hours one train pair
ICE 48	Munich – Augsburg – Ulm – Stuttgart – Heidelberg – Darmstadt	– Frankfurt Airport – Cologne – Düsseldorf – Dortmund	– Osnabrück – Hamburg – Hamburg Altona	every 2 hours one train pair
ICE 55	Dortmund – Essen – Düsseldorf – Cologne – Bonn – Koblenz – Mainz – Mannheim – Heidelberg – Vaihingen – Stuttgart – Ulm – Oberstdorf			One train pair
ICE 60	(Basel Bad – Freiburg – Offenburg – Baden-Baden –) Karlsruhe – Bruchsal –		Stuttgart – Ulm – Augsburg – Munich-Pasing – Munich	Every 2 hours
ICE 60	Saarbrücken – Homburg – Kaiserslautern – Neustadt –		Stuttgart – Ulm – Augsburg – Munich-Pasing – Munich	One train pair
ICE 62	Frankfurt – Darmstadt – Heidelberg –	Stuttgart – Ulm – Augsburg – Munich – Rosenheim – Salzburg – Villach – Klagenfurt – Graz		2 train pairs
ICE 62	Münster – Essen – Düsseldorf – Köln Messe/Deutz – Frankfurt Airport – Mannheim –	Stuttgart – Ulm – Augsburg – Munich – Rosenheim – Salzburg – Villach – Klagenfurt – Graz		One train pair
ICE 62	Dortmund – Bochum – Essen – Duisburg – Düsseldorf – Köln Messe/Deutz – Frankfurt Airport – Mannheim – Heidelberg – Stuttgart – Ulm – Friedrichshafen Stadt – Lindau-Reutin – Bregenz – St. Anton – Innsbruck			One train pair
ICE/TGV 83	Munich – Augsburg – Ulm – Stuttgart – Karlsruhe – Strasburg – Paris Est			One train pair
NJ Stuttgart-Venice; EN Stuttgart-Zagreb	Stuttgart – Ulm – Augsburg – München Ost – Salzburg (split)	– Villach – Treviso – Venezia Santa Lucia		One train pair
NJ Stuttgart-Venice; EN Stuttgart-Zagreb	Stuttgart – Ulm – Augsburg – München Ost – Salzburg (split)	– Bad Gastein – Villach – Ljubljana – Zagreb Glavni kolodvor		One train pair

In addition, the Schienenverkehrsgesellschaft mbH (SVG) operates FEX services on Saturday/Sunday and during holidays.

Line	Route	Frequency	Operator
FEXSüdbahn	Singen (Hohentwiel) – Radolfzell – Überlingen Therme – Friedrichshafen Stadt – Ravensburg – Aulendorf –Ulm – Plochingen – Stuttgart	limited service	SVG Stuttgart

=== Regional services ===
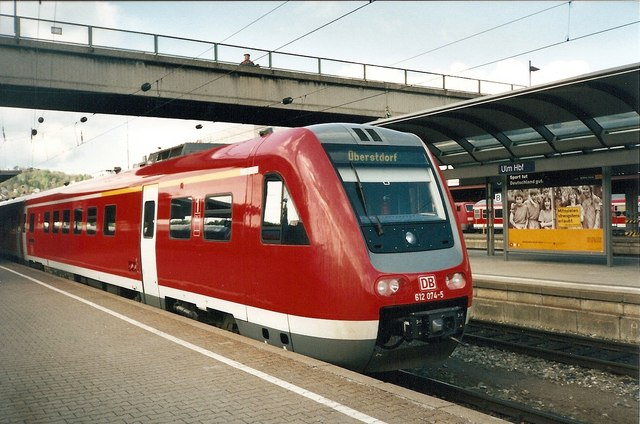
RE of class 612 to Oberstdorf

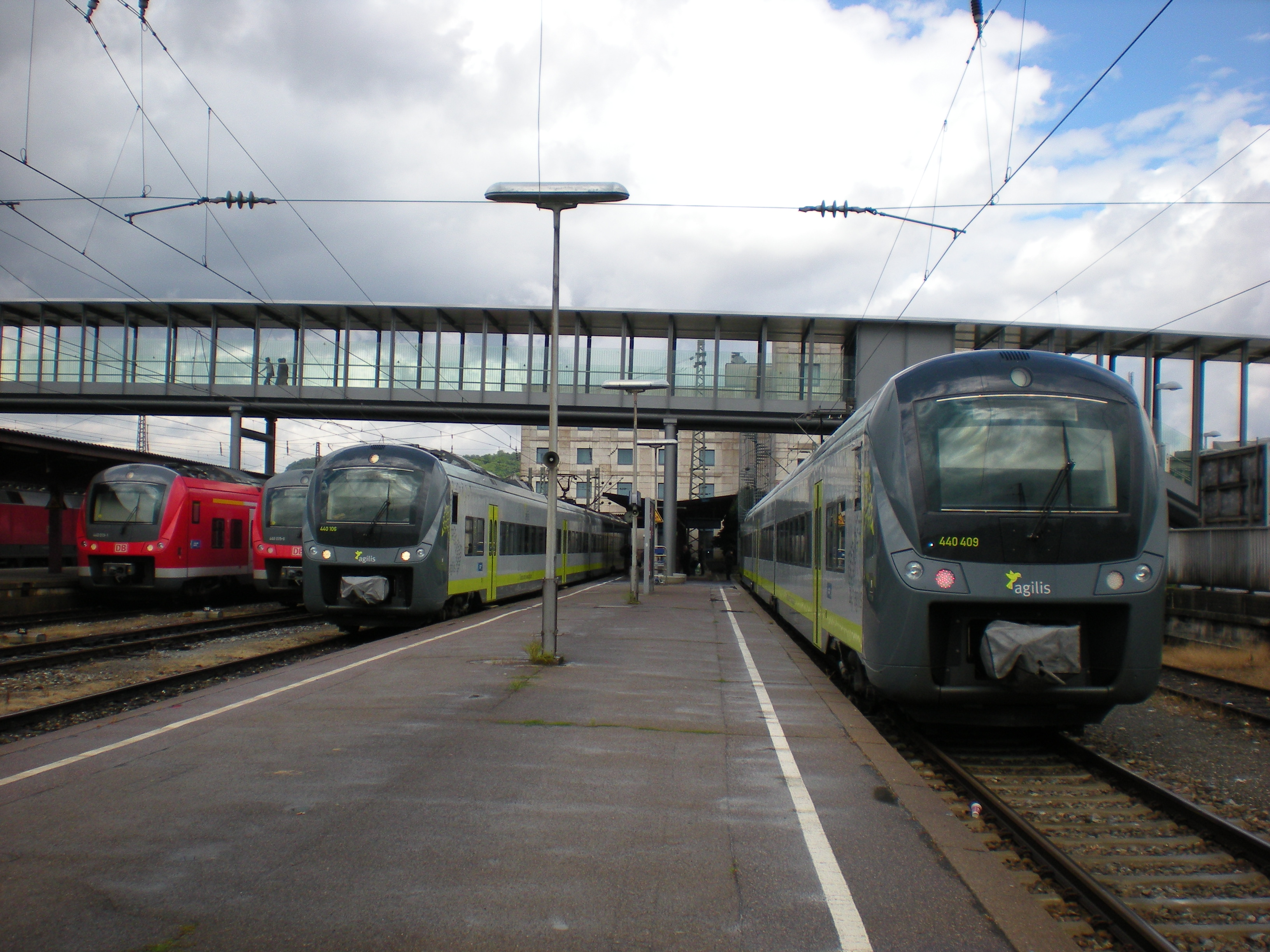
Two Coradia Continental EMUs of agilis towards Ingolstadt in the Bavarian section of Ulm station

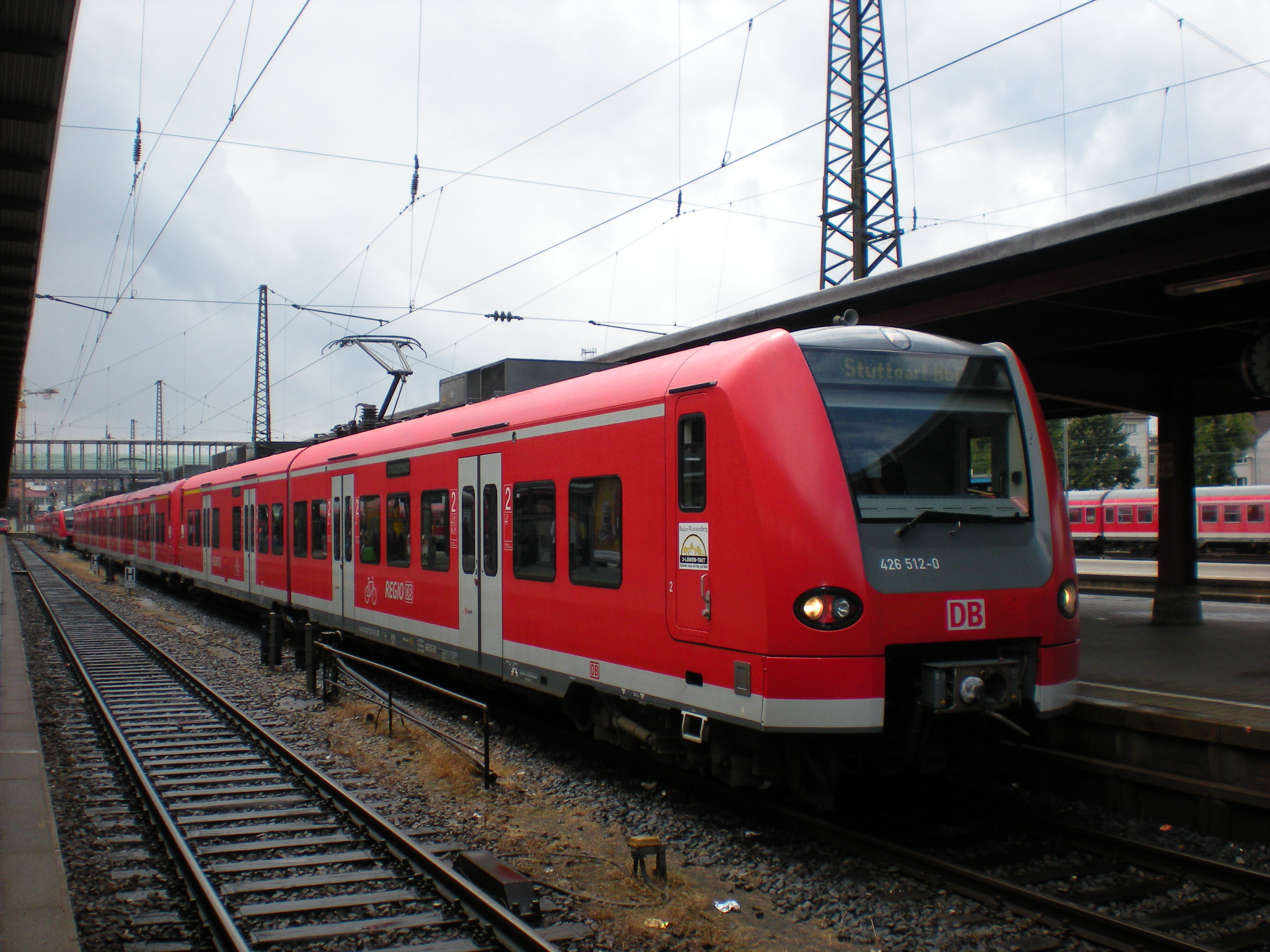
RB service to Stuttgart made up of class 426 and 425 DMUs

In 2022, Ulm Hauptbahnhof is served in regional transport by Interregio-Express, Regional-Express and Regionalbahn services operated by DB Regio and by services operated by private operators. Most of the Regionalbahn services now form part of the Danube-Iller Regional S-Bahn. Ulm is a hub in Baden-Württemberg's Inter-Regional Express network. IRE trains run hourly from Ulm to Friedrichshafen (IRE 3: Südbahn) on the Ulm–Friedrichshafen railway and every two hours to Aalen on the Aalen–Ulm railway (IRE 50).

Regional-Express and Regionalbahn (local) services run on all lines running through Ulm. In addition to locomotive-hauled push-pull trains with double-deck carriages, there are class 650 (Regio-Shuttles), 612, 628, 642 (Siemens Desiro) and 644 (Bombardier Talent) diesel multiple units and class 425 and 440 (Coradia Continental) electric multiple units. Trains of the private railway company Agilis have run since 11 December 2011 on the Ulm–Augsburg railway as far as Günzburg, continuing via the Ingolstadt–Neuoffingen railway to Ingolstadt and the Regensburg–Ingolstadt railway to Regensburg, which also use Coradia Continental EMUs.

In the 2026 timetable, the following regional services stopped at the station:

Connection	Line	Frequency	Operator
RE 3	Ulm – Biberach (Riß) – Ravensburg – Aulendorf – Friedrichshafen Stadt	hourly	DB Regio
RE 5	Stuttgart – Plochingen – Geislingen (Steige) – Ulm – Laupheim West – Biberach (Riß) – Aulendorf – Ravensburg – Friedrichshafen Stadt – Lindau-Reutin	hourly	DB Regio
RE 9	Ulm – Günzburg – Dinkelscherben – Neusäß – Augsburg – Mering – Munich	hourly	Arverio Bayern
RE 18	Ulm – Günzburg – Donauwörth – Ingolstadt – Regensburg (– Plattling)	every 2 hours, Sat–Sun	DB Regio
RE 50	Ulm – Langenau – Giengen – Heidenheim – Oberkochen – Aalen	every 2 hours (1 RE train pair Mon-Fri)	DB Regio
RE 55	Ulm – Blaubeuren – Ehingen – Herbertingen – Sigmaringen (– Tuttlingen – Donaueschingen)	hourly	DB Regio
RE 75	Ulm – Memmingen – Kempten – Immenstadt – Oberstdorf	hourly	DB Regio Bayern
RE 200	Ulm – Merklingen – Wendlingen (Neckar)	hourly	DB Regio
RB 15	Ulm – Günzburg – Donauwörth (– Ingolstadt – Regensburg)	hourly Mon–Fri, every 2 hours Sat and Sun	agilis
MEX 16	Ulm Hbf – Amstetten – Geislingen (Steige) – Göppingen – Plochingen (– Esslingen (Neckar) – Stuttgart Hbf)	hourly	Arverio Baden-Württemberg
RB 59	Ulm Hbf – Schelklingen – Münsingen – Engstingen – Gammertingen	individual services	Schwäbische Alb-Bahn

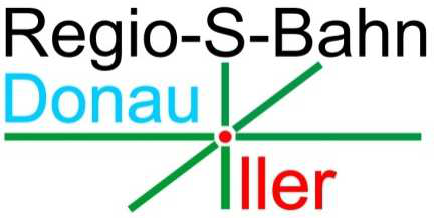

=== Danube-Iller Regional S-Bahn ===
The Danube-Iller Regional S-Bahn (Regio-S-Bahn Ulm/Neu-Ulm) is an urban rail network with its central node in Ulm Hauptbahnhof. The first line from Ulm to Weißenhorn and Memmingen went into operation at the timetable change in December 2020. The service to Weißenhorn uses the Senden–Weißenhorn railway, which was closed for passenger traffic in 1966, but was reactivated for passengers in 2013. In the 2026 timetable, the following S-Bahn services stopped at the station:

Line	Route	Frequency	Operator
RS 2	Ulm – Laupheim West – Biberach (Riß) – Biberach (Riß) Süd	extra peak services	DB Regio Baden-Württemberg
RS 21	Ulm – Laupheim West – Laupheim Stadt – Biberach (Riß) – Biberach (Riß) Süd	hourly	DB Regio Baden-Württemberg
RS 3	Ulm – Blaubeuren – Ehingen – Munderkingen	hourly	SWEG Bahn Stuttgart
RS 5	Ulm – Langenau – Aalen	hourly	SWEG Bahn Stuttgart
RS 51	Ulm – Langenau	hourly	SWEG Bahn Stuttgart
RS 7	Ulm – Neu-Ulm – Senden – Illertissen – Memmingen	hourly (additional trains to Illertissen)	DB Regio Bayern
RS 71	Ulm – Neu-Ulm – Senden – Weißenhorn	hourly	DB Regio Bayern

=== Local traffic ===
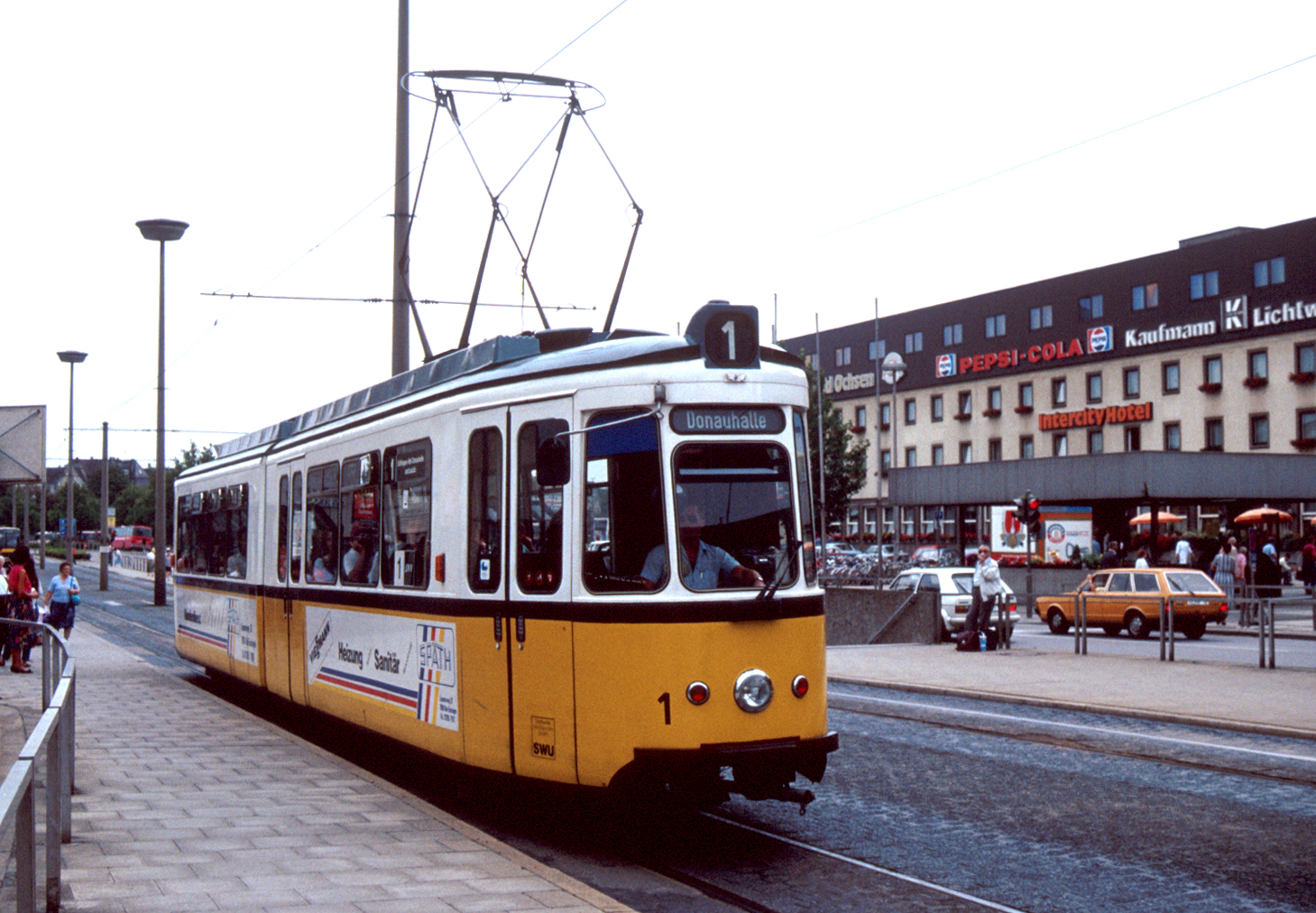
Tram of class GT4 at the Hauptbahnhof tram stop in the station

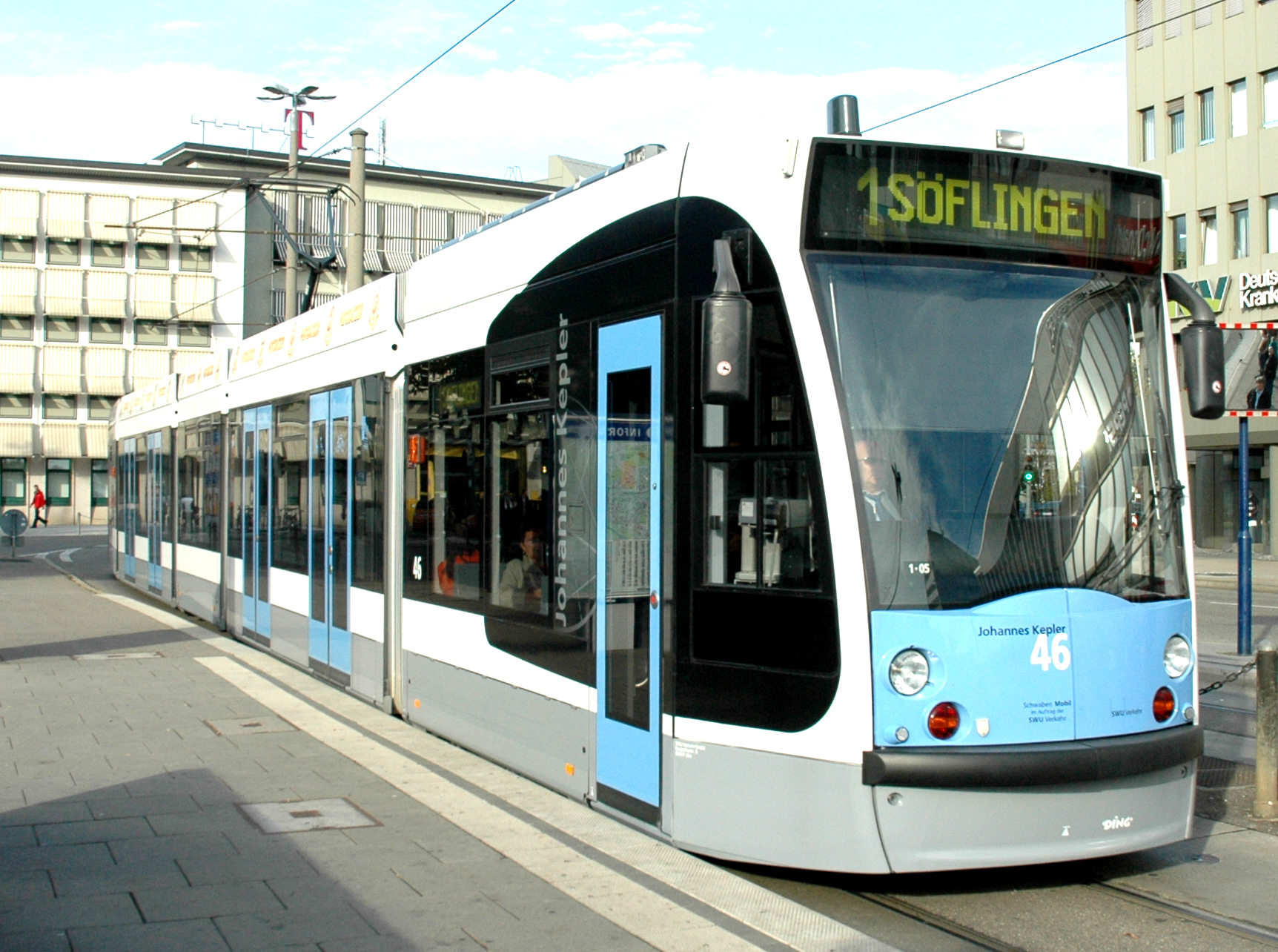
Tram of class Combino in the Hauptbahnhof tram stop in the station

There is a stop in the station forecourt served by Ulm tramline 1 and 2 and bus lines 3, 5, 6, 7, 8 and 10 of Stadtwerke Ulm/Neu-Ulm (a company providing municipal services in Ulm and Neu-Ulm).

The Ulm tramway opened two lines to the Ulm station forecourt on 15 May 1897. While one tram line linked the stations of Ulm and Neu-Ulm, the other ran on the ring around the city centre. Construction of the Zingler Bridge that crosses the tracks south of the station gave the residents of the suburbs lying to the west of the station a connection to the Ulm trams that they had long demanded. The tram crossed the bridge and continued to Söflingen from 18 October 1906. On 14 May 1947, an Ulm trolleybus service was put into operation; its two lines had a stop at Ulm station. It replaced tramline 2 to Neu-Ulm, which had been closed on the 24 December 1944 due to the effects of the war. On 23 October 1963, the trolleybus operation was abandoned and replaced by diesel buses. Starting from 22 May 1967, Ulm tramline 1 used the Ehinger-Tor underpass, completed in 1966, from Donaustadion to Söflingen instead of the Zingler bridge. On 21 March 2009, line 1 was extended from Donauhalle to Böfingen. On 12 September 2018 tramline 2 was opened.

Connection	Route
1	Söflingen – Westplatz – Ehinger Tor – Hauptbahnhof – Willy-Brandt-Platz – Donaustadion – Donauhalle – Böfingen Süd – Böfingen
2	Kuhberg Schulzentrum – Ehinger Tor – Hauptbahnhof – Theater – Universität – Science Park II
5	Wissenschaftsstadt – Heilmeyersteige – Kienlesberg – Hauptbahnhof – Rathaus Ulm – Neu-Ulm ZUP – Hochschule Neu-Ulm – Ludwigsfeld / Hasenweg
6	Donaustadion – Rathaus Ulm – Hauptbahnhof – Bahnhof Söflingen – Eselsberg Hasenkopf
7	Jungingen – Michelsberg – Hauptbahnhof – Ehinger Tor – Neu-Ulm ZUP – Willy-Brandt-Platz
10	Blautal-Center – Theater – Hauptbahnhof – Ehinger Tor – Donautal
11	ZOB Ost – Einsingen – Eggingen – Ermingen – ZOB Ost
12	ZOB Ost – Gögglingen – Donaustetten – Unterweiler (Hartstraße) / Dellmensingen

== Future ==
A new line from Stuttgart to Augsburg (Stuttgart–Augsburg new and upgraded railway) is being built. The Wendlingen–Ulm high-speed railway went into operation in December 2022 and is to be extended to Stuttgart with the commissioning of the Stuttgart 21 project in December 2026. In the long term, the line from Ulm to Augsburg will be extensively upgraded for a top speed of 200 km/h. The Danube bridge was upgraded to four tracks and the Neu-Ulm station was rebuilt in a trench during the Neu-Ulm 21 project.

As a result of the Stuttgart–Augsburg new and upgraded railway project, long-distance and regional traffic to Ulm is expected to increase. In the next few years, the entire station area, the surrounding streets and neighbourhoods are to be completely redesigned and rebuilt in a project known as Citybahnhof Ulm. Basically, the station building is to be rebuilt into a modern city station along with underground connections to the city, to a yet to be built shopping centre and to the Dichterviertel, which is situated on the other side of the railway tracks.

The remodelling of the Ulm station is part of zone 2.5a1 of the Wendlingen–Ulm project. The application for planning approval was made on 23 December 2005. On 7 May 2007, the Federal Railway Authority asked the Government of the Tübingen region to carry out the consultation process. The public hearing was held on 22 June 2009. The consultation report, which took into account various changes to the plan that had already been made, was completed on 18 December 2009.

In early June 2010, Deutsche Bahn issued a Europe-wide tender for the construction supervision of this section. Accordingly, this provided in the station area for the adaption or the construction of 8.52 km of track, for the construction of 150 and the reconstruction of 83 sets of points, the development of the southern end of the station to six tracks, the construction of a double track (585 m long) and a single track (150m long) concrete-lined trenches, two railway bridges and 1,000 m of noise barriers. A total of 74 stages of construction are envisaged. The contract runs from October 2010 to December 2019. In mid-July 2012, clearance of the construction site began.

On 18 January 2012, the Federal Railway Authority asked the Tübingen region to conduct an additional consultation process on further changes to the plans. These changes include the elimination of the originally planned fifth platform in the station, the elimination of Ulm Ost station and modifications to soundproofing and waste water technology. Deutsche Bahn justified the omission of the fifth platform with operational improvements as a result of the concentration of all train parking in a new vehicle maintenance facility and sidings. The Ministry of Transport and Infrastructure doubted whether the platform could actually be eliminated if long-term service improvements (including the planned Danube-Iller Regional S-Bahn) were to be implemented. A critic saw the S-Bahn concept compromised if the fifth platform was not provided from the outset. If a fifth platform was actually necessary, according to the DB, funding would have had to be provided for separately. The DB was not aware of formal plans for an S-Bahn. In 2013, Deutsche Bahn announced that it would extend platform 5a for regional trains and install additional sets of points instead of a fifth platform.

Deutsche Bahn puts the cost of connecting the new line to the station, including further work, at about €120 million. These costs would be borne by the federal government, Deutsche Bahn and the state of Baden-Württemberg. As the last structural work on the new line, two construction contracts for its connection to the station were awarded in January 2016 for around €52m. The reconstruction of the north end of the station, for around €38m, was awarded to a consortium of the companies Geiger and Schüle Bau (Ulm), Matthäus Schmid Bauunternehmen (Baltringen) and Kurt Motz Tiefbau (Illertissen). For a further €13m, track and civil engineering work was awarded to a consortium of the companies Max Bögl (Stuttgart), Bickhardt Bau (Kirchheim) and Hartung Bau (Fulda).

After the Albabstieg Tunnel was broken through in November 2016, the line was put into operation at the end of 2022.

== Culture ==
- This rail station is mentioned in the Volkslied Auf de schwäbsche Eisebahne.

== See also ==
- Rail transport in Germany
- Railway stations in Germany
