= Langenau (Württ) station =

Train station in Langenau, Germany

Langenau (Württ)
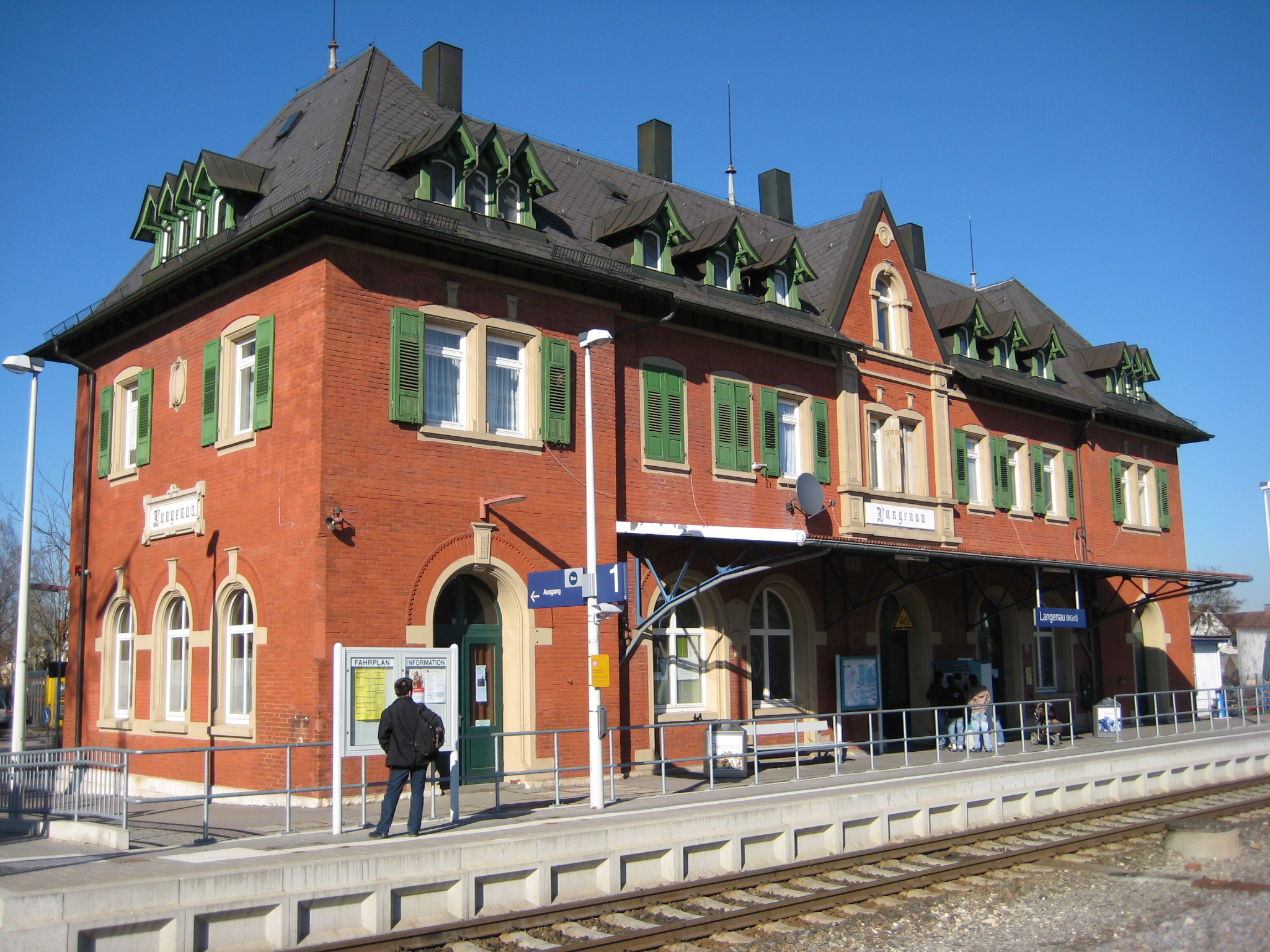
- 2008

General information
- Location: Lenaustraße/Bahnhofstraße; 89129 Langenau; Baden-Württemberg; Germany
- Coordinates: 48.4936°N 10.1263°E
- Elevation: 460 m (1,510 ft)
- System: Bf
- Owner: Deutsche Bahn
- Operator: DB Station&Service
- Lines: Brenz Railway (KBS 757)
- Platforms: 2 side platforms
- Tracks: 2
- Train operators: DB Regio Baden-Württemberg; Hohenzollerische Landesbahn

Construction
- Parking: yes
- Cycle facilities: yes
- Accessible: yes

Other information
- Station code: 3527
- DS100 code: TLL
- IBNR: 8003525
- Category: 5
- Fare zone: DING: 42
- Website: www.bahnhof.de

Services
Preceding station	DB Regio Baden-Württemberg	Following station
Ulm Hbf Terminus	RE 50	Giengen (Brenz) towards Aalen Hbf
Preceding station	(Offenburg)	Following station
Thalfingen (b Ulm) towards Ulm Hbf	RS 5	Niederstotzingen towards Aalen Hbf
Unterelchingen towards Ulm Hbf	RS 51	Terminus
Location
- Location within Baden-Württemberg Location within Germany Location within Europe

Langenau (Württ) station is a railway station in the municipality of Langenau, located in the Alb-Donau-Kreis in Baden-Württemberg, Germany.
