= Aalen–Ulm railway =

Railway line in Baden-Württemberg and Bavaria, Germany

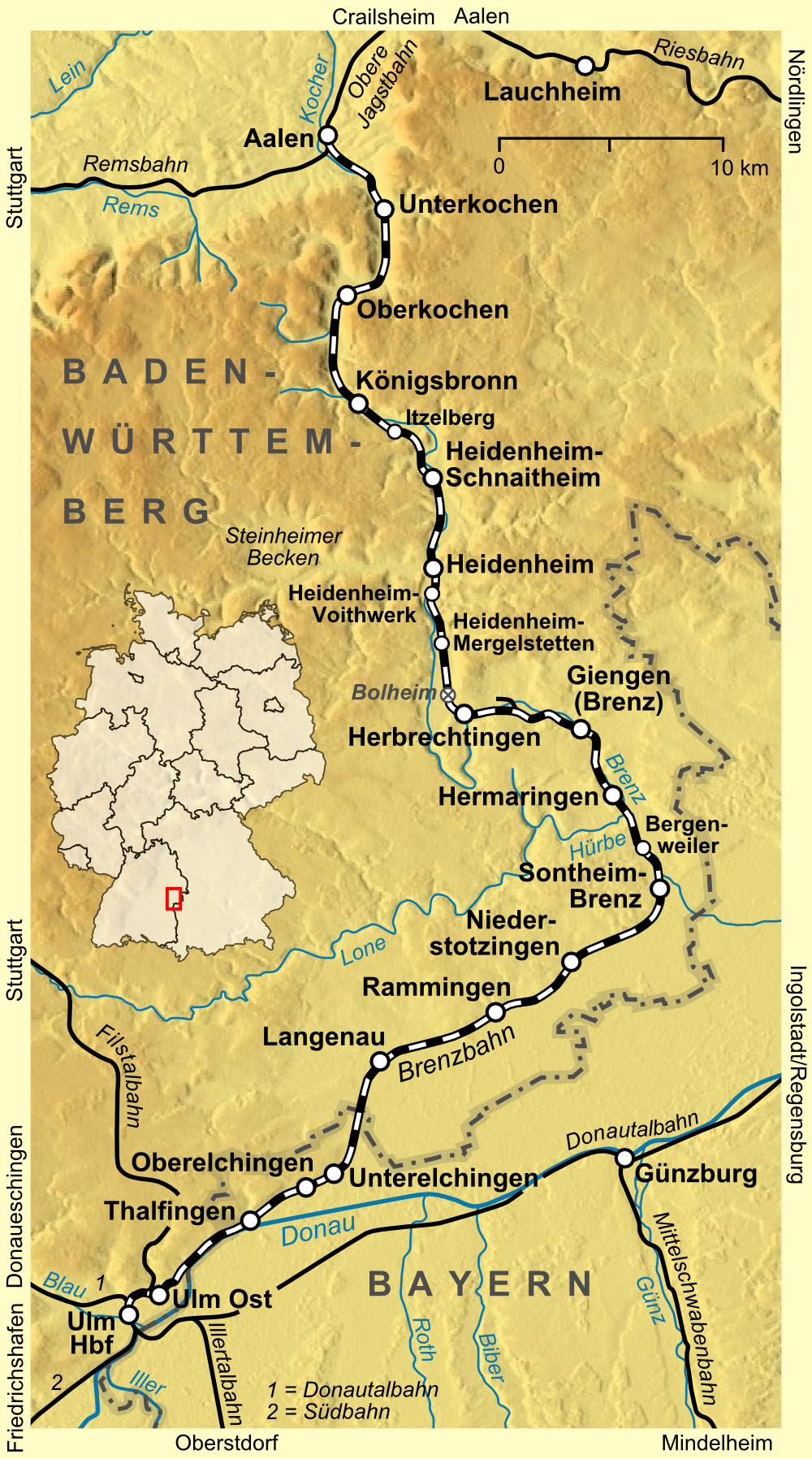

Overview
- Other name: Brenz Railway
- Native name: Brenzbahn
- Line number: 4760
- Locale: Baden-Württemberg, Germany
- Termini: Aalen; Ulm Hbf

Service
- Route number: 757

Technical
- Line length: 72.476 km (45.034 mi)
- Track gauge: 1,435 mm (4 ft 8 1/2 in) standard gauge
- Operating speed: 160 km/h (99 mph)

The Aalen–Ulm railway, also called the Brenzbahn (Brenz Railway}) or the Brenztalbahn (Brenz Valley Railway), is a single-tracked, non-electrified main line from Aalen to Ulm in southern Germany. It is 72.5 km (45.0 mi) long and, for 27 km (16.8 mi), follows the Brenz River that gives it its name.

== History ==
In the 1830s a commission was established on behalf of King William I of Württemberg to investigate whether a railway would be a suitable means to connect the Neckar with Lake Constance and to expedite the movement of goods in Württemberg. For the Eastern Railway (Ostbahn) from Stuttgart to Ulm, the experts examined both a route along the Rems and Brenz, as well as along the Fils. Although the escarpment of the Swabian Alb posed a difficult obstacle to overcome for the Fils route, it was selected in preference to a route along the Brenz because it did not need to pass through Bavaria.

The so-called Brenz railway clause was historically important for the railways. This was part of a treaty contracted on 21 February 1861 between the kingdoms of Bavaria and Württemberg in relation to the continuation of the Rems Railway (Remsbahn) between Stuttgart and Wasseralfingen to the border near Nördlingen and the connection to the Bavarian network. Bavaria's agreement for this link depended on Württemberg agreeing that for twelve years from the date of opening of the Cannstatt–Nördlingen line no rail connection would be opened between it and the Cannstatt-Ulm line on the route of the eventual Brenz Railway. The reason was that the connection from Nördlingen to the Württemberg shore of Lake Constance (at Friedrichshafen) would have been shorter than the connection on the Bavarian side (to Lindau).

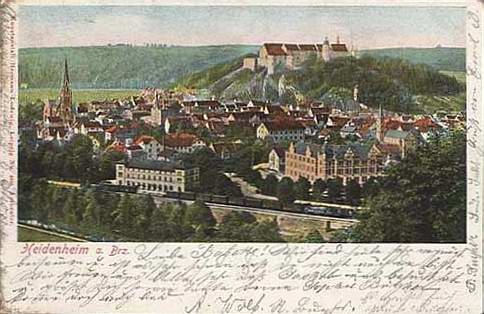
Heidenheim in 1902

Construction of the Brenz Railway started on the basis of a Württemberg law of 17 November 1858. The construction between Aalen and Heidenheim began in 1862. Although planned for two tracks—this can still be seen at various bridgeheads—it opened as a single track. The only tunnel is through the Brünneleskopf (between Schnaitheim and Itzelberg) and is 257.1 metres long. Two years later, on 12 September 1864, the Brenz line was formally opened to Heidenheim. The line was extended to Niederstotzingen on 25 July 1875 and to Langenau on 15 November 1875. Construction continued of the line to Ulm only in 1875, after the expiration of the Brenz railway clause and on the basis of a new Wurttemberg–Bavaria treaty of 8 December 1872. This section was opened on 5 January 1876.

From 1 May 1911 to 1956 there was a connecting line from Sontheim to Gundelfingen in Bavaria on the Ingolstadt–Neuoffingen railway.

== Development ==
From 2003 to September 2007 platforms and level crossings were modernised and rail tracks and signalling systems were renewed along the entire route for a total cost of around €75 million. In November 2006, the last semaphore signal on the Brenz railway was taken out of service, the electronic interlocking at Heidenheim controls the line from Oberkochen until Thalfingen (near Ulm). Eurobalises were installed on the line in preparation for operations with tilting trains .

There are currently 44 rail crossings on the line.

The regional plan of the East Württemberg region provides for the duplication and electrification of the line. In November 2009 the Regional Council commissioned a feasibility study into the electrification and duplication of the line.

== Passenger services ==
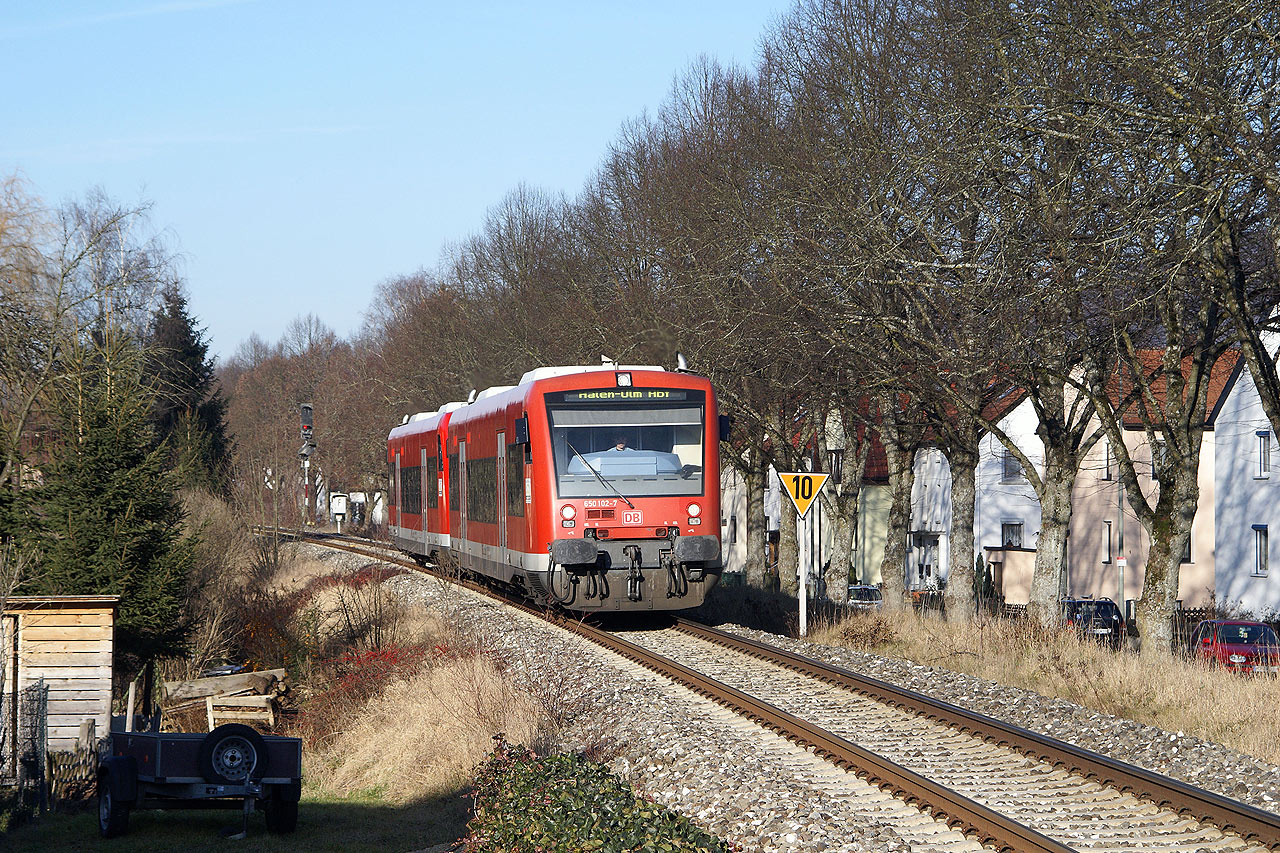
Class 650 Regio-Shuttle in Schnaitheim

Services on the line include Regional-Express services every hour on the Ellwangen–Aalen–Ulm route (every two hourly from Crailsheim) and Regionalbahn trains between Biberach/Laupheim and Langenau operated by DB ZugBus Regionalverkehr Alb-Bodensee GmbH (RAB), a subsidiary of DB Regio. In addition, every two hours Interregio-Express (IRE) services connect Aalen and Ulm in less than an hour. These are operated with railcars of class 611 diesel multiple units, which have been upgraded to operate with Eurobalises. Most traffic on the line are carried in class 650 Regio-Shuttles in single units but in addition locomotive-hauled trains with class 218 locomotives and Silberling carriages and class 628.2 railcars are used.
