= Donau-Iller-Nahverkehrsverbund =

German regional transport cooperative

- Founded: January 1, 1998; 28 years ago
- Headquarters: Ulm
- Area served: Ulm, Neu-Ulm, Alb-Donau-Kreis, Biberach (district), Neu-Ulm (district)
- Key people: Bastian Goßner (CEO)

The Donau-Iller-Nahverkehrsverbund (German for Danube-Iller Local Transport Association, abbreviated DING, the German word for thing) is a regional transport cooperative that coordinates tickets and fares among all transport operators in the area of the city of Ulm and the districts of Alb-Donau, Biberach and Neu-Ulm. It was founded in 1998 and is a public funding body.
