= Bad Saulgau station =

Railway station in Bad Saulgau, Germany

Bad Saulgau
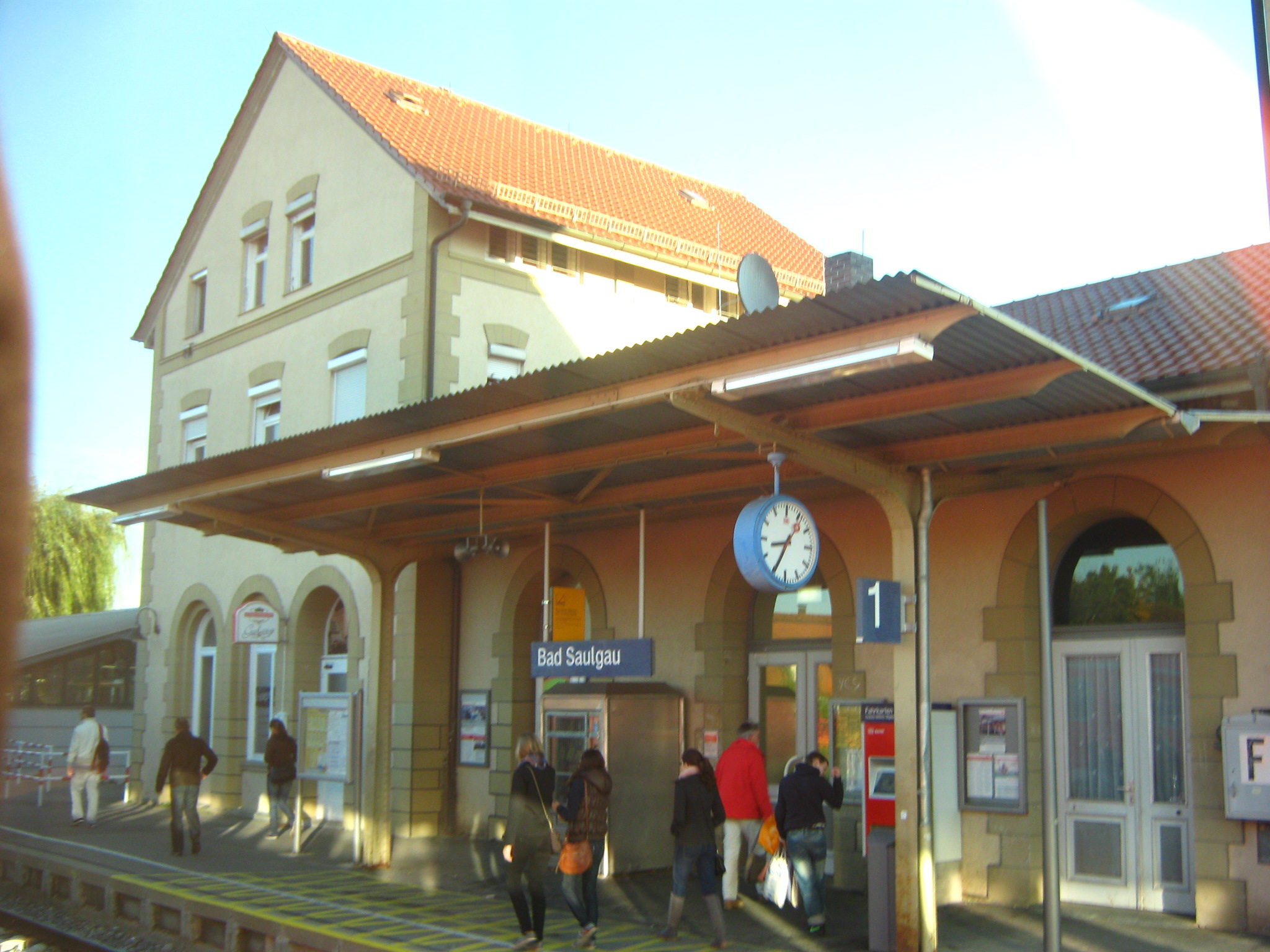
- 2012

General information
- Location: Karlstraße 6; 88348 Bad Saulgau; Baden-Württemberg; Germany
- Coordinates: 48.0136°N 9.5013°E
- Owner: DB Netz
- Operator: DB Station&Service
- Lines: Herbertingen–Aulendorf railway (KBS 766)
- Platforms: 2 side platforms
- Tracks: 2
- Train operators: DB Regio

Other information
- Station code: 5520
- DS100 code: TSL
- IBNR: 8005301
- Category: 6
- Fare zone: bodo: 83; DING: 246 (bodo transitional tariff); naldo: 446
- Website: www.bahnhof.de

Services
| Preceding station | DB Regio Baden-Württemberg | Following station |
|---|---|---|
| Herbertingen Ort towards Stuttgart Hbf | RE 6a | Altshausen towards Aulendorf |
| Herbertingen Ort towards Albstadt-Ebingen | RB 53 | Altshausen towards Aulendorf |
Location
- Location within Baden-Württemberg

Bad Saulgau station is a railway station in the municipality of Bad Saulgau, located in the Sigmaringen district in Baden-Württemberg, Germany.
