= Allgäu Railway =

Allgäu Railway may refer to:

- Allgäu Railway (Bavaria), now operated as the Munich–Buchloe railway and the Buchloe–Lindau railway
- Allgäu Railway (Württemberg), now operated as the Herbertingen–Isny railway
