= Merklingen - Schwäbische Alb station =

Railway station in the municipality of Merklingen

Merklingen - Schwäbische Alb
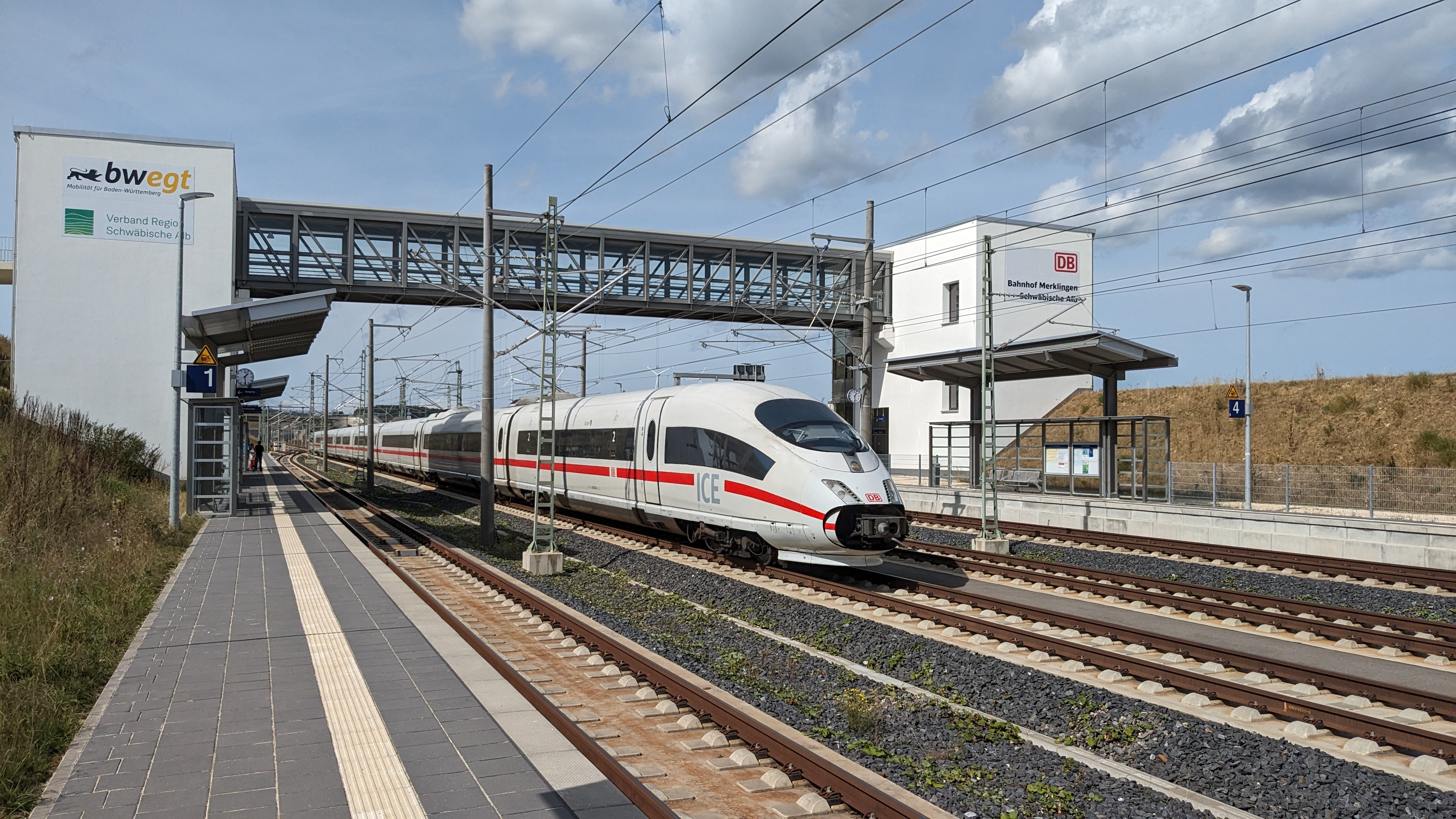

General information
- Other names: Merklingen (Schwäbische Alb) (in the planning phase)
- Location: Mühlweg 100; 89188 Merklingen; Baden-Württemberg; Germany
- Coordinates: 48°31′14″N 09°44′32″E
- Elevation: 712 m (2,336 ft)
- System: Bf
- Owner: DB Netz
- Operator: DB Station&Service
- Lines: Wendlingen-Ulm (KBS 750.1)
- Platforms: 2 side platforms
- Tracks: 4
- Train operators: DB Regio Baden-Württemberg
- Connections: Bus interchange

Construction
- Parking: yes
- Cycle facilities: yes
- Accessible: yes

Other information
- Station code: 8350
- DS100 code: TMKL
- Category: 5
- Fare zone: DING: 55
- Website: www.bahnhof.de

History
- Opened: 11 December 2022

Services
Preceding station	DB Regio Baden-Württemberg	Following station
Wendlingen (Neckar) Terminus	RE 200	Ulm Hbf Terminus
Location
- Location within Baden-Württemberg Location within Germany Location within Europe

Merklingen - Schwäbische Alb station is a railway station in the municipality of Merklingen, located in the Alb-Donau district in Baden-Württemberg, Germany. The station is located on the Wendlingen–Ulm high-speed railway. The train services are operated by DB Regio Baden-Württemberg.

== Location and structure ==
The station is located about one kilometer northwest of the center of Merklingen. Two 215 m long and 2.50 m wide platforms were built. The four-track facility is spanned by an approximately 30 m long pedestrian walkway with two stair towers and integrated elevators. 400 parking spaces for cars, three spaces for buses and parking facilities for bicycles complete the facility. It comprises ten switches, including four catch points.

The tracks for the trains passing through are located on the inside, the platform tracks on the outside. They have a length of 600 meters. The entire station has a ballastless track, and ETCS Level 2 is used as the train protection system without conventional signals. Between the four entry signals there are eight exit signals (as ETCS Stop Marker) and three block indicators. The system is controlled by the Merklingen train dispatcher from the Neckartal computer-based interlocking sub-center.

The platform height is 76 cm, after a height of 55 cm was originally planned. The useful length of the two platforms is 210 m. Threading into and out of the platform tracks can take place at 100 km/h. The southern platform track is referred to as track 1 and the northern platform track as track 4.

The longitudinal gradient of the line is around 5 per mille in the station and is compensated for by measures in the platform design.

The station was built on the land available for the construction of the Wendlingen-Ulm high-speed railway; no additional land was taken up. An embankment was built on one side and a retaining wall on the other.

== History ==
=== Prehistory ===
Until 1985, Merklingen had two stations on the disused Amstetten-Laichingen railway, the Merklingen station and the Merklingen East stop.

The regional planning assessment of the new line in 1995 included as a planning recommendation to keep open a further railway stop on the new line in the Merklingen area. A possible connection of the Dornstadt freight center to the new line via a stop in Merklingen was also mentioned in it. At that time, an overtaking station was planned near Merklingen.

In 2003, at an information event organized by DB Netz, people asked about a railway stop. Gerhard Maier, a citizen of Laichingen, arranged for the idea of a station on the Laichinger Alb to be taken into account in the project planning. Although an ICE stop at Laichinger Alb demanded by the Alb-Donau district during the planning approval procedure for the section was not included in the planning approval decision issued in 2008 for section 2.3 of the new line, the decision stated that the line layout and the distance to the highway would allow for a later retrofit. According to later information from the project management, the subsequent realization would not have been financially feasible.

After that, the idea of a railroad station was forgotten by politicians until construction work began on the new line. On the fringes of the Steinbühl Tunnel, Laichingen's mayor Klaus Kaufmann asked Baden-Württemberg's Minister of Transport Winfried Hermann for a discussion on the establishment of a train station in the Merklingen area, whereupon the latter promised to look into the matter in November 2013. In the summer of 2013, the then District Administrator Heinz Surek wrote letters to members of parliament and ministers as well as initiatives in the Alb-Donau District Council to bring a regional train station back into the discussion. At the municipal level, an alliance was formed between the towns of the Laichinger Alb municipal administration association and the municipality of Berghülen.

=== Potential analysis ===
At the beginning of 2014, the Alb-Donau district, with the financial participation of the interested communities, commissioned a potential analysis for a possible regional train station near Merklingen for 26,000 euros, which was presented in July 2014. According to the survey, about 1500 travelers would use the station daily. According to this first estimate, costs of 26.6 million euros were to be expected, with 4.8 million euros for planning and 21.8 million euros for construction. Since the additional stop increases travel time by 2 to 4 minutes, connections at the hub stations of Ulm and Stuttgart would be at risk. According to the analysis, this could be compensated for by using train equipment that can travel at speeds higher than 160 km/h on the new line, thus saving time. The potential analysis put the additional costs for nine 190 km/h regional trains at 23 to 45 million euros, which would have to be co-financed by the district and the municipalities.

According to the state of negotiations in the fall of 2014, the state would cover half of the infrastructure costs, the Alb-Donau district one sixth and the participating municipalities one third. The regional partners would also have to finance around 2.2 million euros for additional bus services and as a share in the purchase of fast regional trains; this does not include the proceeds from bus and rail services. The state's transport minister announced in February 2015 that he would finance half of the station's infrastructure costs and order trains for it, provided a cost-benefit analysis - as planned as part of the feasibility study - was presented and the municipalities financed the other half of the infrastructure costs and ordered buses. A feasibility study was commissioned by the Alb-Donau district and seven municipalities in the region at the end of 2014. The six municipalities of the Alb-Donau district were joined by Hohenstadt (district of Göppingen); the Ulm Chamber of Commerce and Industry also contributed to the costs.

=== Feasibility study ===
The feasibility study presented on July 20, 2015, resulted in a benefit-cost factor of -0.3. Funding for the station under the State Municipal Transport Financing Act would thus not be possible. The main reason for the negative result was the assumed procurement of 10 faster train sets, for which 30 million euros were estimated. The 190 km/h fast trains were necessary to make the stop in Merklingen compatible with the ICE timetable of the line. Costs of 21 million euros were calculated for the entire infrastructure.

The study, which cost 226,000 euros, was based on the potential analysis and was carried out by a joint venture of the companies Obermeyer and Ramboll. It is based on the standardized evaluation. The experts expect about 950 passengers per day, an increasing demand for commercial space and - due to the proximity to the airport and the Stuttgart trade fair - positive effects for the hotel and restaurant industry. Furthermore, excursion guests are to be attracted with target group-oriented offers. The stop would reduce the number of passengers traveling on the Ulm-Sigmaringen line by about 250 per day, and on the Filstal line from Stuttgart to Ulm by 130. The feasibility study should serve as the basis for talks with the state about funding.

The feasibility study favored a station location west of Merklingen. The feasibility study is based on a conservative scenario (with 950 daily users); an optimistic scenario (with 1600 users) was not pursued further. The underlying forecast is based, among other things, on the assumption that commuters would take eleven minutes from turning into the parking lot to boarding; if seven were assumed, 1200 travelers could be expected. The authors of the feasibility study also assume that positive structural effects would not take effect until after the 2030 horizon of the study.

As a result, a project group consisting of representatives of the municipalities, the state ministry of transport and the railway was established.

=== Realization discussion ===
On July 24, 2015, a round of Alb mayors with Transport Minister Winfried Hermann, Hilde Mattheis, Member of the Bundestag, District Administrator Heinz Seiffert, four members of the state parliament, as well as representatives of the experts and the local transport company Baden-Württemberg agreed to find financing outside the state transport financing law. On the one hand, the federal government should be asked to consider a consideration of the stop in the federal traffic route planning, and on the other hand, the state should consider providing funds from the special assets formed for the Stuttgart-Ulm rail project. In addition, the mayors of the municipalities on the Laichinger Alb agreed to contribute 13 million euros (half of the infrastructure costs), subject to the approval of the individual municipal councils. According to the railroad, the preliminary planning must be completed by the fall of 2015, otherwise additional costs will have to be expected. On July 28, 2015, the Alb-Donau district council voted in favor of implementing the stop.

In September 2015, the Baden-Württemberg Ministry of Transport and Infrastructure came to the conclusion in its own calculations for the benefit-cost analysis of the feasibility study that the station was economical and that the way was thus basically clear for funding by the state. Optimization of operational processes and additional infrastructure improvements on the southern runway could eliminate the need to purchase faster vehicles. To compensate for the two-minute increase in travel time caused by the stop in Merklingen, the purchase of used Interregio train sets or an early turnaround in Friedrichshafen (with a second driver) instead of Lindau is considered, while maintaining economic efficiency. A benefit-cost index of 2.23 was determined for the former variant, and 1.13 for the latter. In the second variant, additional signal compression on the Ulm–Friedrichshafen railway should help. The MVI announced that it would seek discussions with the Ministry of Finance on this basis.

The neighboring district of Göppingen mobilized against the project. The town of Geislingen an der Steige in particular feels that its location on the Fils Valley Railway would be weakened by a rail stop on the new line. In a resolution at the end of September 2015, the local council there called for the planning to be discontinued.

In talks between the ministry and the municipalities and the railway, it was agreed on October 23, 2015, to proceed with the planning, the costs of which were financed by the municipalities involved.

Nearly 6,000 people took part in a postcard campaign for the rail stop at the end of 2015.

=== Realization ===
In 2015, Deutsche Bahn was prepared to build the station if the financing was secured, the operation of long-distance traffic was not impaired and the work fit into the construction schedule of the section between Hohenstadt and Merklingen, which was started in the summer of 2015.

For this to happen, building rights would have to be obtained in the course of 2016 and the structures needed for the station would have to be completed or at least started by the end of 2017, when the 87-million-euro contract for the section near Merklingen would be completed. The assumption of the cost risk became the subject of negotiations.

At the end of February 2016, it became known that Deutsche Bahn was demanding an investigation of the station's underground, for which costs in the millions of euros were to be incurred.

On February 15, 2016, planning approval was applied for at the Federal Railway Authority, which was issued on August 5, 2016. The planning approval only relates to the actual railroad facilities, not to the planned commuter parking lot. The resolution to prepare the development plan was passed on February 23, 2016, followed by the resolution to issue the statutes in October 2020. In the meantime, in May 2018, the draft planning was submitted for review.

The realization and financing agreement was signed on December 2, 2016, by Minister of Transport Winfried Hermann, DB-Netz Board Member for Network Planning and Major Projects Dirk Rompf and Laichingen Mayor Klaus Kaufmann at Merklingen Town Hall. The contracting parties are Deutsche Bahn, the state and the special-purpose association "Verband Region Schwäbische Alb - Association for the Construction of Merklingen Station (Swabian Alb) and the Intermunicipal Development of Industry and Commerce", which was founded at the end of November 2016. The founding members were the towns and municipalities of Laichingen, Berghülen, Drackenstein, Heroldstatt, Hohenstadt, Merklingen, Nellingen and Westerheim. Later, Bad Ditzenbach and Dornstadt as well as Wiesensteig joined the association. The member municipalities are located in the Alb-Donau district as well as in the district of Göppingen. Talks are being held with other municipalities in the region. In contrast, the municipal council of Römerstein rejected participation at the end of September 2017 and that of Gruibingen in mid-November 2017. In 2018, the town of Wiesensteig and the municipalities of Bad Ditzenbach, Mühlhausen im Täle and Dornstadt joined. In addition to the development of the railway station, the special purpose association also pursues the goal of establishing an intermunicipal commercial area of about 50 hectares.

The earthworks for the station were awarded on March 20, 2017. The contract for the track construction was awarded on June 30, 2017. The structural work was scheduled to be completed by April 19, 2018. On October 31, 2018, the construction site was handed over to the railroad engineering department. In parallel, from May 16, 2018, to September 26, 2019, the bridge including elevators were constructed.

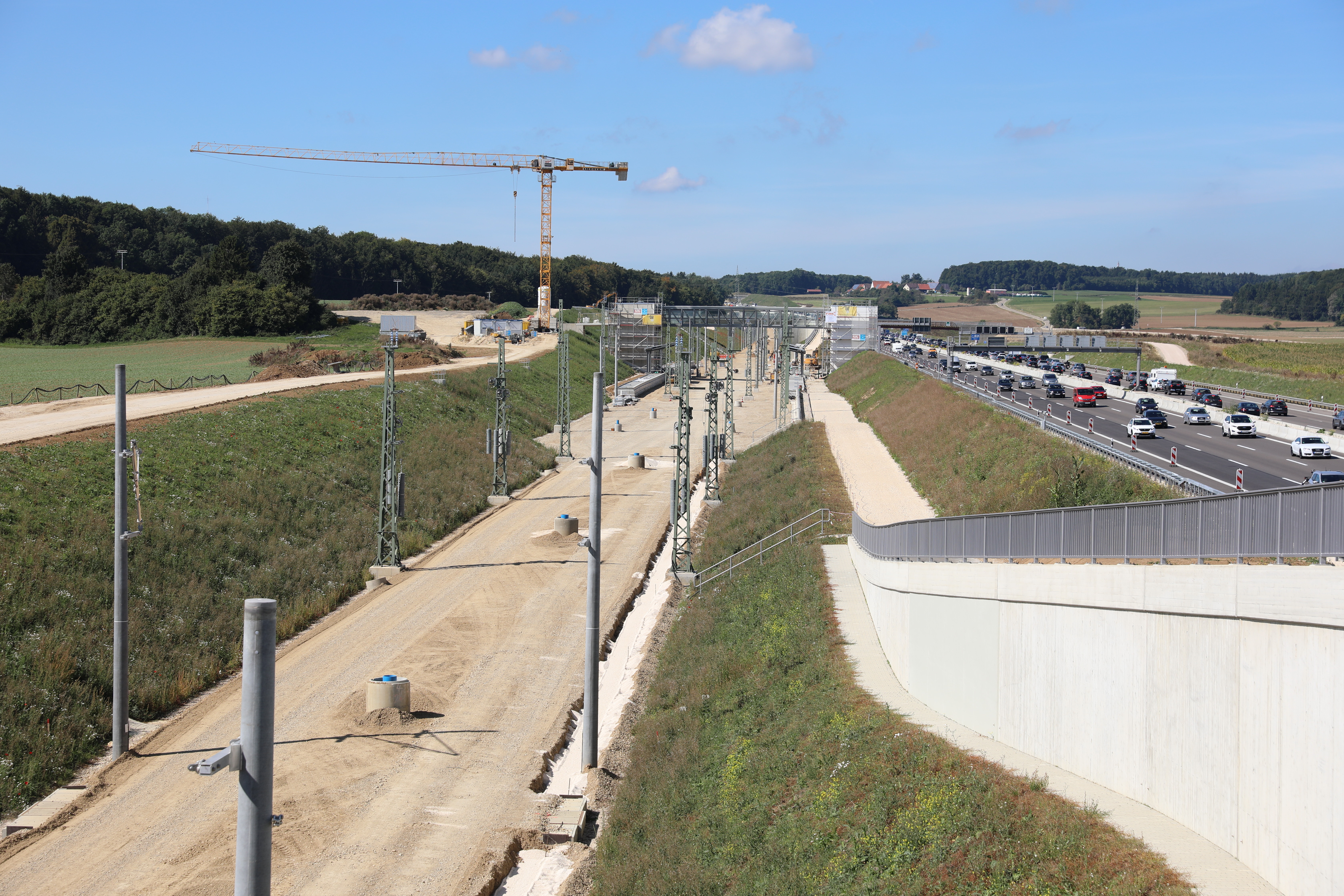
View of the future east head of the station (September 2019)

The symbolic groundbreaking ceremony took place on May 18, 2017. The station's shell, including furnishings, was put out to tender in April 2018 and awarded to Leonhard Weiss for 4.1 million euros.

The services for the railroad equipment were awarded together with the new line at the beginning of 2018.

In 2019, with the exception of the elevator paving, the civil engineering work was completed. In 2020 and 2021, work was carried out on the superstructure and track. The work was completed at the end of 2021 and test runs on the line started in 2022. In 2022, work continued on the parking lot, including a bus shelter, bicycle storage hall, which will be completed in 2023 with the roofing of the parking lot with a photovoltaic system and e-car charging stations.

== Transport connection ==
=== Rail ===
Since December 11, 2022, the Interregio-Express line IRE 200 from Wendlingen (Neckar) to Ulm Hauptbahnhof and back serves the station hourly. It is operated by DB Regio Baden-Württemberg and is listed in the timetable under table number 750.1. Long-distance trains, on the other hand, pass through it without stopping.

Once Stuttgart 21 goes into operation in December 2025, the station will be served by trains on the Karlsruhe-Stuttgart-Ulm-Friedrichshafen line. The travel time to Stuttgart main station will be 31 minutes, to Stuttgart airport long-distance station 20 minutes and to Ulm 11 minutes.

The state of Baden-Württemberg planned to invite tenders for regional traffic on the new line when the exact completion date of the line is clear. In June 2018, preliminary information was published by the state on the advance operation of regional traffic via Wendlingen. The contract for regional services between Wendlingen, Merklingen and Ulm was announced in October 2020. In the first stage, an hourly service between Ulm and Merklingen and a 2-hour service between Ulm and Wendlingen are planned with a total of around 600,000 train kilometers per year. In a second stage, the start of which is not yet clear, an hourly frequency between Ulm and Wendlingen with around 800,000 train kilometers per year is planned. The contract is to run for five years, with termination by the customer possible for the first time in December 2025.

According to information from mid 2020, it should not initially be possible to implement a planned hourly service between Wendlingen and Ulm due to the existing infrastructure and the long-distance operating program. In the meantime, an hourly service in each direction is planned between Wendlingen, Merklingen and Ulm. The journey time to Ulm is to be 12 minutes, to Wendlingen 14 minutes. From 5 a.m. to midnight, trains in both directions are to depart at minute 39. The departure times are to change when Stuttgart 21 goes into operation in December 2025.

Original plans envisaged a continuation of the trains to Würzburg, which would result in an increase in travel time that would have to be compensated for on the other lines. The stop in Merklingen causes a travel time extension of 2:40 minutes. One minute of this should be compensated by an earlier departure in Würzburg. Without further compensation, the transition time between the fast regional service and the service to Allgäu would be reduced from 5 to 3.5 minutes at Aulendorf station. The impact on the Württemberg Southern Railway is to be compensated for, among other things, by faster train driver changes in Friedrichshafen Hafen. In the meantime, a through connection to Karlsruhe instead of Würzburg is planned.

The first expert draft of the Deutschlandtakt presented in October 2018 also envisages an hourly connection to Merklingen station, with a 160 km/h regional line that is to achieve a travel time of 39 and 40 minutes between the main stations of Stuttgart and Ulm, respectively. An hourly service is also included in the third expert draft submitted in June 2020. The line serving Merklingen is to run from Karlsruhe main station to Friedrichshafen Hafen.

=== Street ===
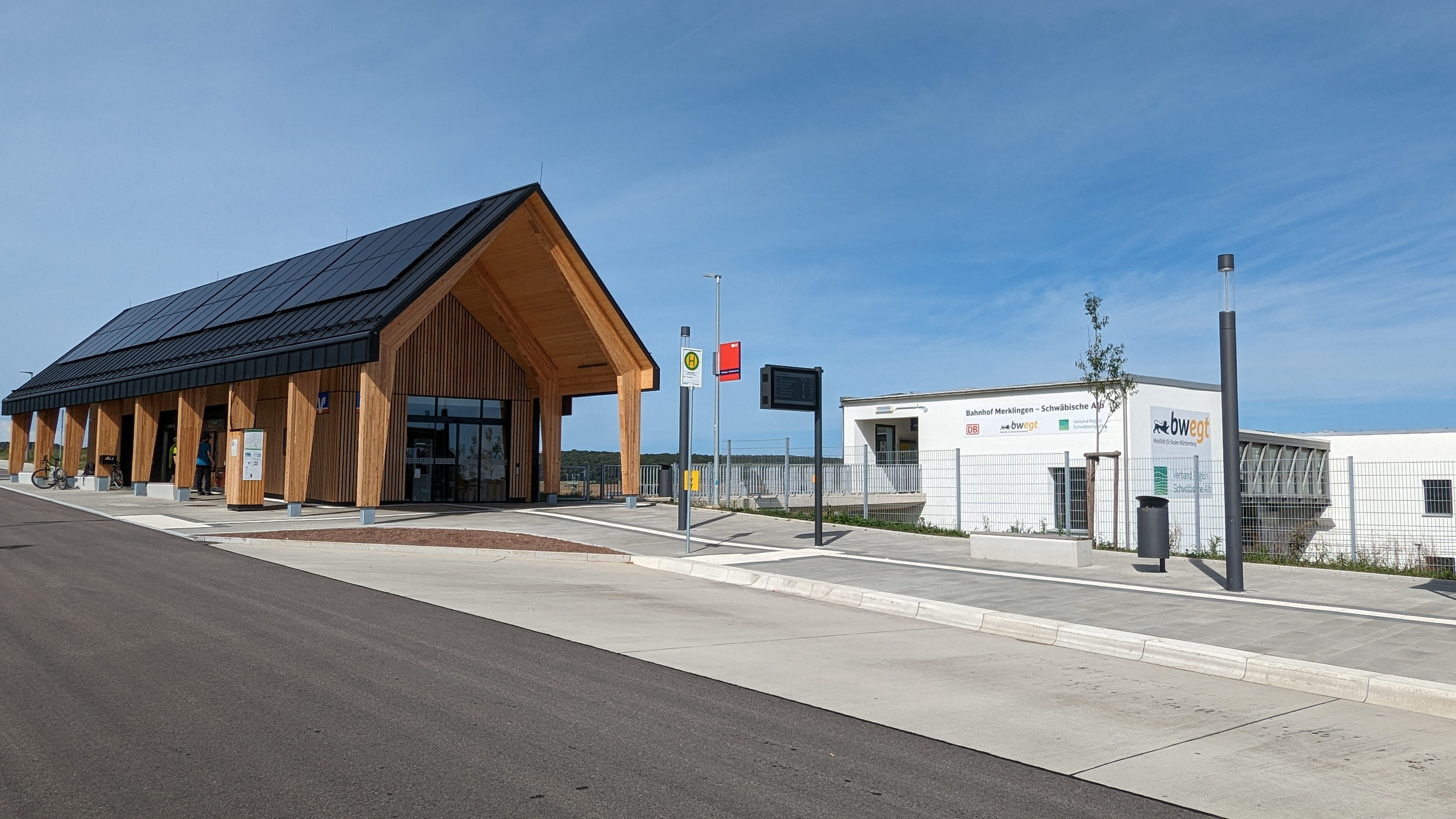
Bus stop at the entrance building

For commuters, 420 parking spaces, five short-term parking spaces and five cab stands were created on a 4.2-hectare site. Access is via a spur road from Kreisstraße 7407.

Two bicycle parking garages are also planned, each with 30 indoor and 12 outdoor parking spaces as well as 20 lockers, a toilet facility and charging stations for e-cars and e-bikes. Two bus shelters are planned at the bus stops. In total, the Swabian Alb Region Association is investing 4.6 million euros in the connection of the station. The regional association is also considering building a solar farm on the parking lot, for which 150 covered carports could be built. The development plan leaves open the later realization of a parking garage with 570 parking spaces.

== Costs, benefits and financing ==
For preliminary planning (including a cost estimate), design planning and approval planning of the railroad system (without road connection and parking lot), the municipalities (total 198,000 euros) and the district (99,500 euros) contributed a total of 297,500 euros.

The municipalities were to contribute 13 million euros to the planning and construction costs. The district assumed one third of the planning costs (according to different information 4.2 million euros or 3.1 million euros) and, in addition, the bus connection of the station (one million euros per year). The state initially (as of mid-2015) wanted to bear the remaining 9.5 million euros of total estimated construction costs of 19.4 million euros, as well as the cost risk.

On October 23, 2015, the state of Baden-Württemberg announced that the state would assume the remaining construction costs - over and above the 13 million euros from the municipalities - insofar as these were within the range discussed to date. The participation of the municipalities in the total amount of 13 million euros demanded by the Ministry of Transport corresponds, with around 23,100 inhabitants, to a share of 564 euros per inhabitant. Laichingen (6.1 million euros), Westerheim (1.6 million euros), Heroldstatt (1.5 million), Berghülen, Merklingen and Nellingen (1.1 million each) and Hohenstadt (0.4 million euros) will participate in the financing.

At the end of July 2016, the State Ministry of Transport announced that the benefit-cost study would produce a benefit-cost factor of 1.5. Accordingly, the costs for the station should amount to 44 million euros. According to the study, 26.5 million euros would be spent on planning and building the actual station facilities and 5.5 million euros on the area surrounding the station. Another 3 million euros were earmarked for upgrades to the Württemberg Southern Railway to compensate for the time lost due to the stop. An additional €9 million was budgeted for maintenance. The upgrading of the southern runway and the planning costs for the station had not been included in the previous calculations, which accounted for a large part of the cost increase. The planning and construction costs will still be borne jointly by the municipalities with 13 million euros and the state of Baden-Württemberg, which plans to contribute 30 million euros from regionalization funds. The missing million to cover the costs could be explained by the rounding of the partial sums, which is why it was assumed that the realization and financing contract would be available in August 2016 and could be signed by all parties in November 2016.

From the 13-million-euro package of the municipalities, the 2 million euros earmarked for a karst exploration were also to be financed. The state took over 1.6 million euros of this, around 400,000 euros the region (of which again 133,000 euros the district). The region financed the state share in advance and would have been reimbursed if the stop was not realized. If the station project had failed, the Baden-Württemberg Ministry of Finance would have assumed two-thirds of these costs (according to other information, 80 percent).

The federal government announced at the end of August 2015 that it would not participate in the financing of the rail stop. However, it accepted if the economic viability of the stop (as was done in the feasibility study) was not considered separately as long as the economic viability of the entire line was hardly changed.

A study on the regional effects of the station commissioned by the state Ministry of Transport and presented in 2017 calculated that the station would generate an annual economic benefit of 4.8 million euros. According to the study, the majority of the expected 1350 daily passengers will travel in the direction of Ulm. Furthermore, the catchment area for trains in the direction of Stuttgart is larger: While 75 percent of the passengers in the direction of Ulm will come from the nine municipalities, only 60 percent will come from Stuttgart. Young people would migrate less often, and land prices could rise. Furthermore, 3300 additional day tourists and 600 additional overnight stays per year were expected.

In November 2018, it became known that the cost of the station will increase by 10 million euros to then 53 million euros. The state considered covering the additional costs from funds under the Regionalization Act.
