= Leutkirch station =

Railway station in Leutkirch im Allgäu, Germany

Leutkirch
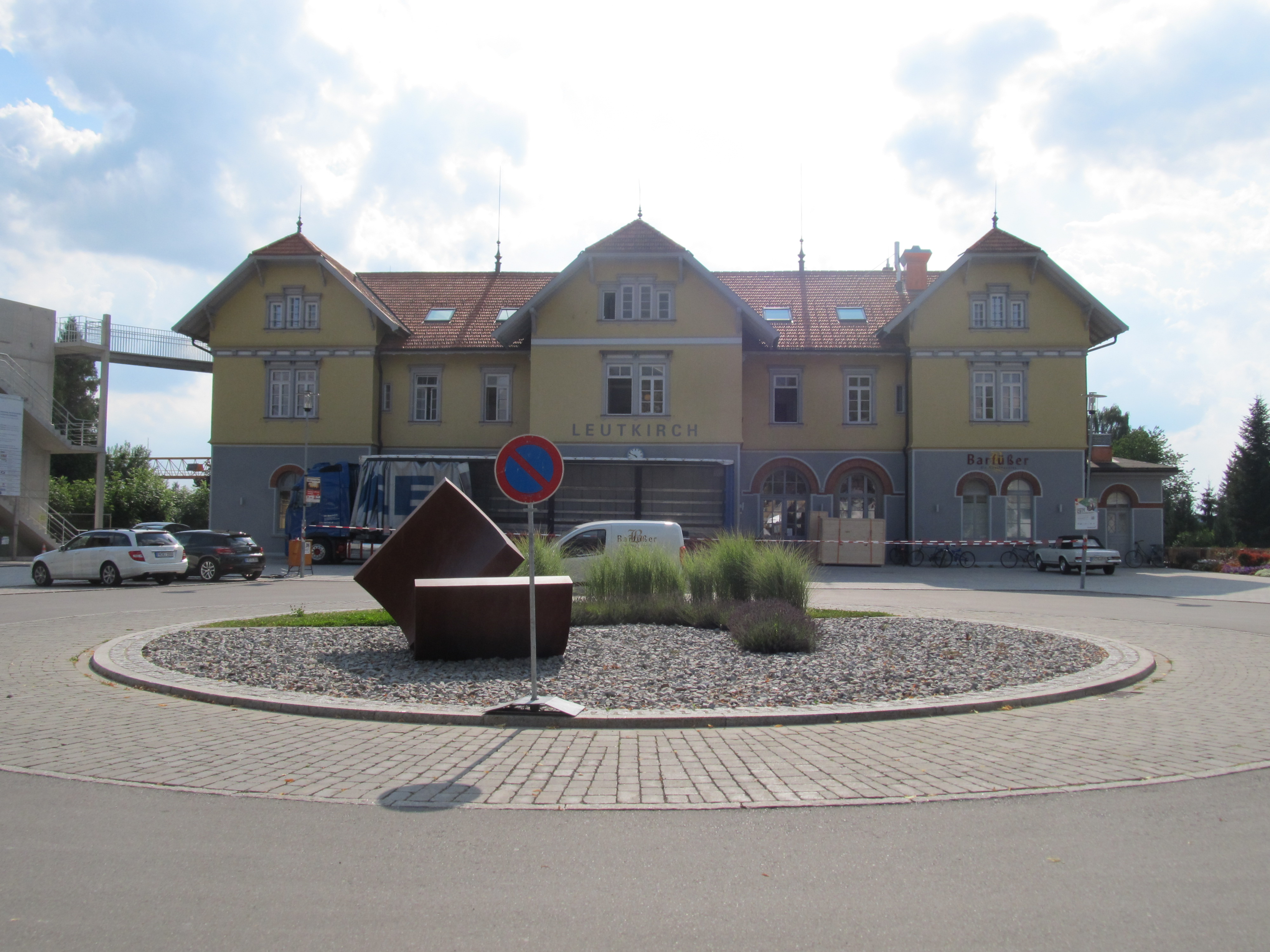

General information
- Location: Leutkirch im Allgäu, Baden-Württemberg; Germany
- Coordinates: 47°49′35″N 10°00′59″E
- Lines: Leutkirch–Memmingen (km 0.000); Aulendorf–Leutkirch (km 68.612); Leutkirch–Isny (km 68.612) (closed)
- Platforms: 2

Construction
- Accessible: Yes

Other information
- Station code: 5823
- DS100 code: TLK
- IBNR: 8000336
- Category: 5
- Fare zone: bodo: 68
- Website: www.bahnhof.de

History
- Opened: 1 September 1872

Services
Preceding station	DB Regio Baden-Württemberg	Following station
Kißlegg towards Aulendorf	RB 53a	Terminus
Preceding station		Following station
Kißlegg towards Lindau-Insel	RE 72	Aichstetten towards München Hbf
Kißlegg towards Lindau-Reutin	RE 96	Aichstetten towards München Hbf
Kißlegg towards Lindau-Reutin	RE 92	Aichstetten One-way operation
Kißlegg towards Lindau-Reutin	RB 92	Aichstetten towards Memmingen
Location

Leutkirch station is the station of the town of Leutkirch im Allgäu in the German state of Baden-Württemberg. It is classified by Deutsche Bahn as a category 5 station and has two platform tracks. The station is located on the network of the Bodensee-Oberschwaben Verkehrsverbund (Lake Constance-Upper Swabia Transport Association, bodo) and belongs to fare zone 68. The address of the station is Bahnhof 1.

The station was opened on 1 September 1872 as the terminus of the Württemberg Allgäu Railway. On 14 August 1874, with the opening of the line to Isny, it became a through station. In preparation for the opening of the line to Memmingen on 2 October 1889 when Leutkirch became a railway junction, the current station building was built between the diverging tracks.

== History ==
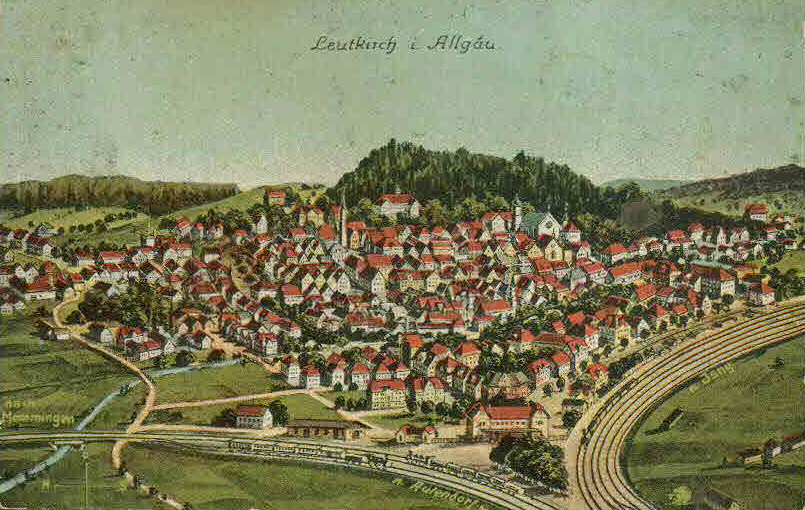
Early 20th-century painting focussed on the station

The station was opened on 1 September 1872 as a terminus with the opening of the Kißlegg to Leutkirch section of the Württemberg Allgäu Railway. The temporary station building was opened with a floor area of 27 × 10 metres. The wooden, one-storey building had rooms for the post office, railway service rooms and two waiting rooms.

On 14 August 1874, it became a through station with the opening of line to Isny. In preparation for the opening of the line to Memmingen on 2 October 1889 when Leutkirch became a railway junction, the current station building was built as a “wedge station” (German: Keilbahnhof) between the diverging tracks.

Leutkirch became a through station again on 31 December 2001 when the line to Isny was closed. The station building is listed as a historical monument and was restored between 2011 and 2012. The costs involved were financed by the town and a cooperative of 600 citizens who provided €1 million. The town station was declared as the "Monument of the Month” in April 2012 by the Memorial Foundation of Baden-Württemberg.

== Operations ==
=== Long distance services ===
On 27 May 1979, the first express train was introduced on the Munich–Memmingen–Lindau-Insel route. A pair of trains (numbered 366/367) ran from Munich via Lindau and Zürich Airport to Milan, stopping in Wangen and Leutkirch. The express train was formed of a class 218 locomotive hauling modern carriages, but it was withdrawn in May 1982. The ECE 88 now runs on the Munich–Zürich route through the station without stopping; it only stops between Buchloe and Lindau-Reutin in Memmingen.

=== Regional services ===
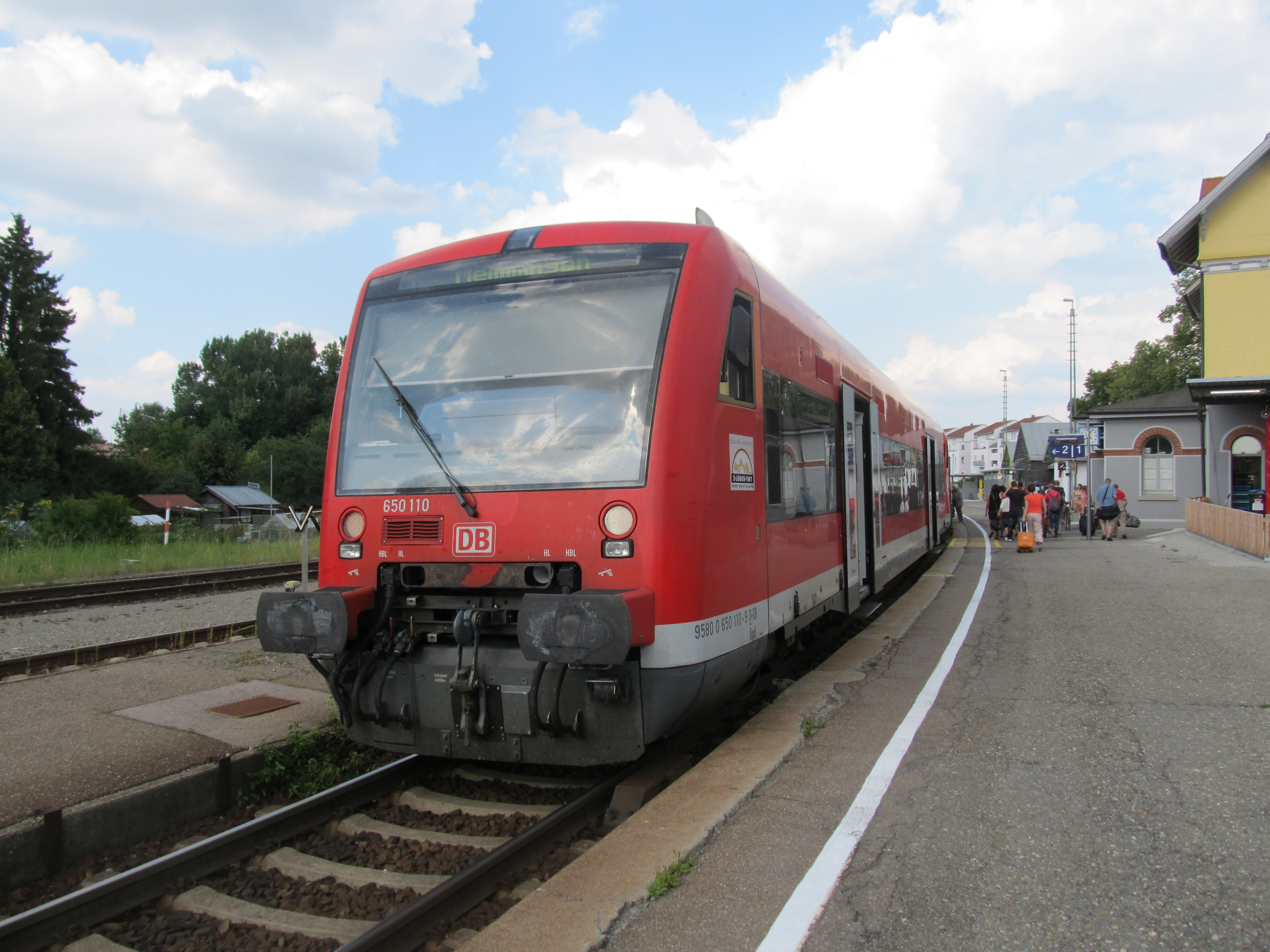
Regionalbahn service to Memmingen on platform 1 prior to the electrification of the line in 2020

The station is served every two hours by two services operated by Go-Ahead Bayern, the RE 96 (Munich–Leutkirch–Lindau) and the RB 92 (Memmingen–Leutkirch–Lindau-Insel). Additionally Leutkirch is served every two hours by the RB 53 to/from Aulendorf, operated by DB Regio.

Services in 2025 timetable
Train class	Route	Frequency
RE 72	(Lindau-Insel – Wangen (Allgäu) –) Kißlegg – Leutkirch – Memmingen – Mindelheim – Buchloe – München	Some trains
RE 96	Munich – Buchloe – Mindelheim – Memmingen – Leutkirch – Kißlegg – Lindau-Reutin	Every two hours
RB 53a	Aulendorf – Kißlegg – Leutkirch	Every two hours
RB 92 RE 92	Memmingen – Leutkirch – Kißlegg – Lindau-Insel	Every two hours
