= Bad Schussenried station =

Railway station in Germany

Bad Schussenried
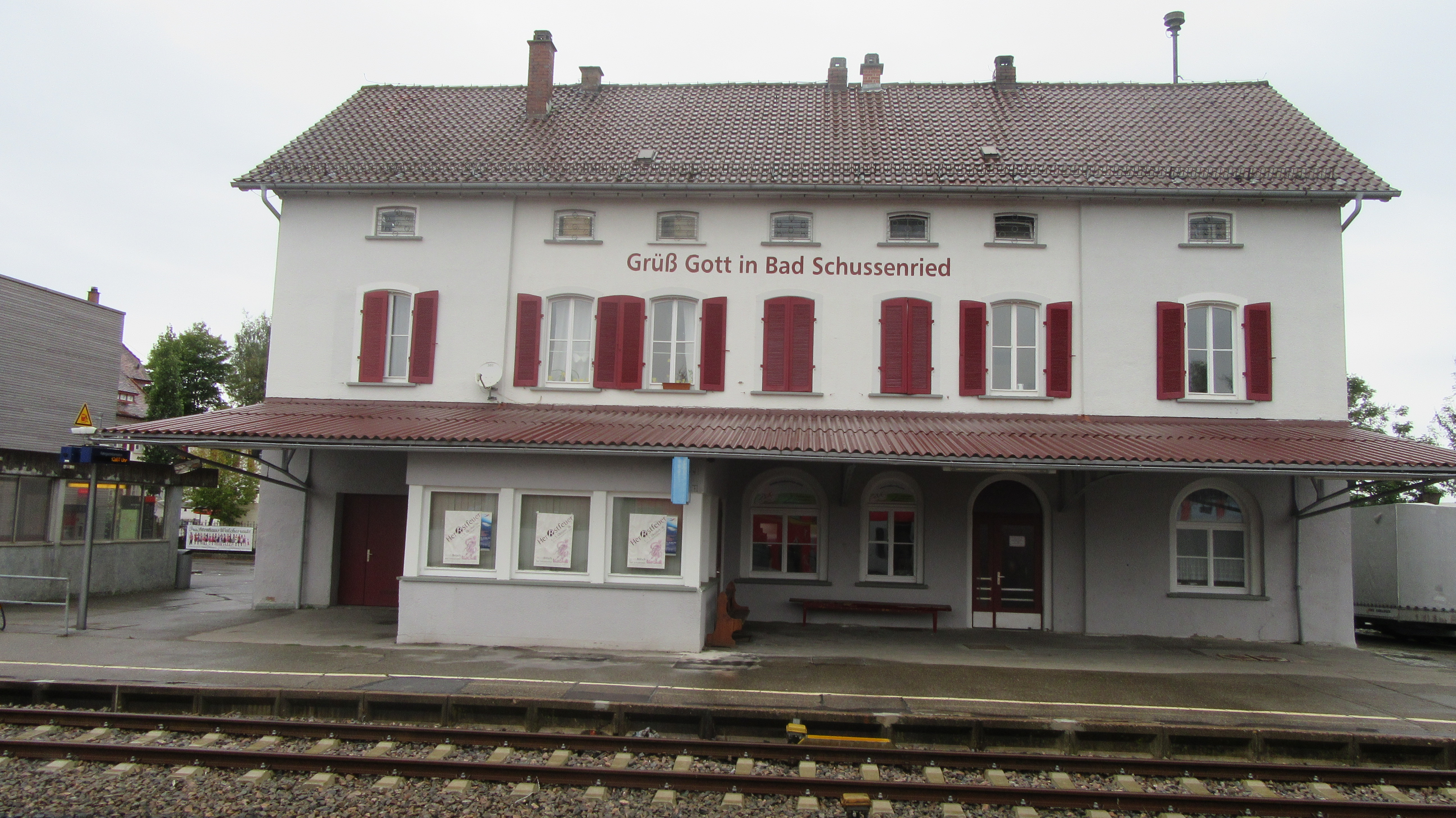
- 2016

General information
- Location: Bahnhof 1; 88427 Bad Schussenried; Baden-Württemberg; Germany
- Coordinates: 47.9941°N 9.6686°E
- Elevation: 558 m (1,831 ft)
- Owner: DB Netz
- Operator: DB Station&Service
- Lines: Ulm–Friedrichshafen (KBS 751); Federsee Railway
- Platforms: 1 island platform 1 side platform
- Tracks: 3
- Train operators: DB Regio Baden-Württemberg

Other information
- Station code: 342
- DS100 code: TBSC
- IBNR: 8000746
- Category: 5
- Fare zone: DING: 134 and 145; bodo: 90 (DING transitional tariff)
- Website: www.bahnhof.de

Services
Preceding station	DB Regio Baden-Württemberg	Following station
Biberach (Riß) towards Stuttgart Hbf	RE 5	Aulendorf towards Lindau-Reutin
Location
- Location within Baden-Württemberg

Bad Schussenried station is a railway station in the municipality of Bad Schussenried, located in the Biberach district in Baden-Württemberg, Germany.
