= Leutkirch–Memmingen railway =

Single-track railway in Baden-Württemberg, Germany

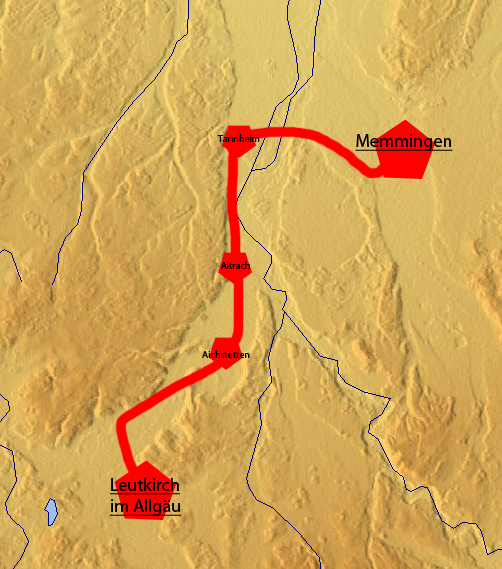

Overview
- Line number: 4570
- Locale: Baden-Württemberg

Service
- Route number: 971

Technical
- Line length: 31.540 km (19.598 mi)
- Number of tracks: Single track
- Track gauge: 1,435 mm (4 ft 8 1/2 in) standard gauge
- Electrification: 15 kV 16.7 Hz AC

The Leutkirch–Memmingen railway is a 31.540 km long, single-track railway in the German state of Baden-Württemberg, which connects Leutkirch and Memmingen. It has been electrified as part of the Munich–Lindau line since 2020.

== History ==
Two years after the completion of the construction of the Neu-Ulm–Kempten railway in 1863, the citizens of Wangen campaigned for a cross-border line connecting the Buchloe–Lindau railway with the new line in Memmingen. Since this proposal lacked political support, the plans came to nothing and meanwhile the Herbertingen–Isny railway was opened through the Württemberg Allgäu in various stages until 1880. Nevertheless, there continued to be support for a connection to Bavarian Swabia and Upper Bavaria.

In 1876 and 1886 there were further proposals from Memmingen for building a direct connection to Lindau through Württemberg. The second proposal resulted in negotiations between the two countries, although this was initially unsuccessful because Bavaria insisted on responsibility for the management of the entire line to Lindau. However, starting in 1870, the German military increasingly urged the closure of the last gaps in the railway between the garrisons in southern Bavaria and Württemberg and southern Alsace, finally leading to the signing of a treaty in 1887.

After nearly three years of construction, the line from Leutkirch im Allgäu to Memmingen was opened on 2 October 1889. Leutkirch was connected to the existing Württemberg Allgäu Railway from Aulendorf via Kißlegg to Wangen and Isny. A new "wedge" station (Keilbahnhof) was built at Leutkirch.

The military was involved in the implementation: the tracks in the Württemberg area were commissioned for the Royal Württemberg State Railways (Königlich Württembergischen Staats-Eisenbahnen) by members of the Berlin railway regiment; its exercises sometimes involved participation in civil construction projects.

1889: on 2 September at 7 AM, a composite detachment of railway troops from Prussia, Saxony and Württemberg marched through the local town after laying the tracks on the new railway from Leutkirch to the Bavarian border. The detachment consisted of 230 men with 7 officers and it returned to its garrison in Berlin ... The new line is part of a strategic railway, but it is expected to bring economic benefits, especially for Memmingen.

— Friedrich Clauß Döderlein, Memminger Chronik

The closure of the second gap at a border between Wangen and Hergatz on 15 July 1890 finally created an alternative connection to the Bavarian Allgäu Railway from Munich and Augsburg to Lindau via Buchloe, with the newer route through Württemberg shorter than the older Bavarian Allgäu Railway via Kempten.

The line has been electrified as part of the Munich–Lindau line with work completed in December 2020. During the construction for the upgrade and the electrification, several level crossings went adaptable with new safety systems, overpasses replaced some level crossings. Acoustic barriers were newly constructed around Memmingen and Leutkirch station.

== Route ==
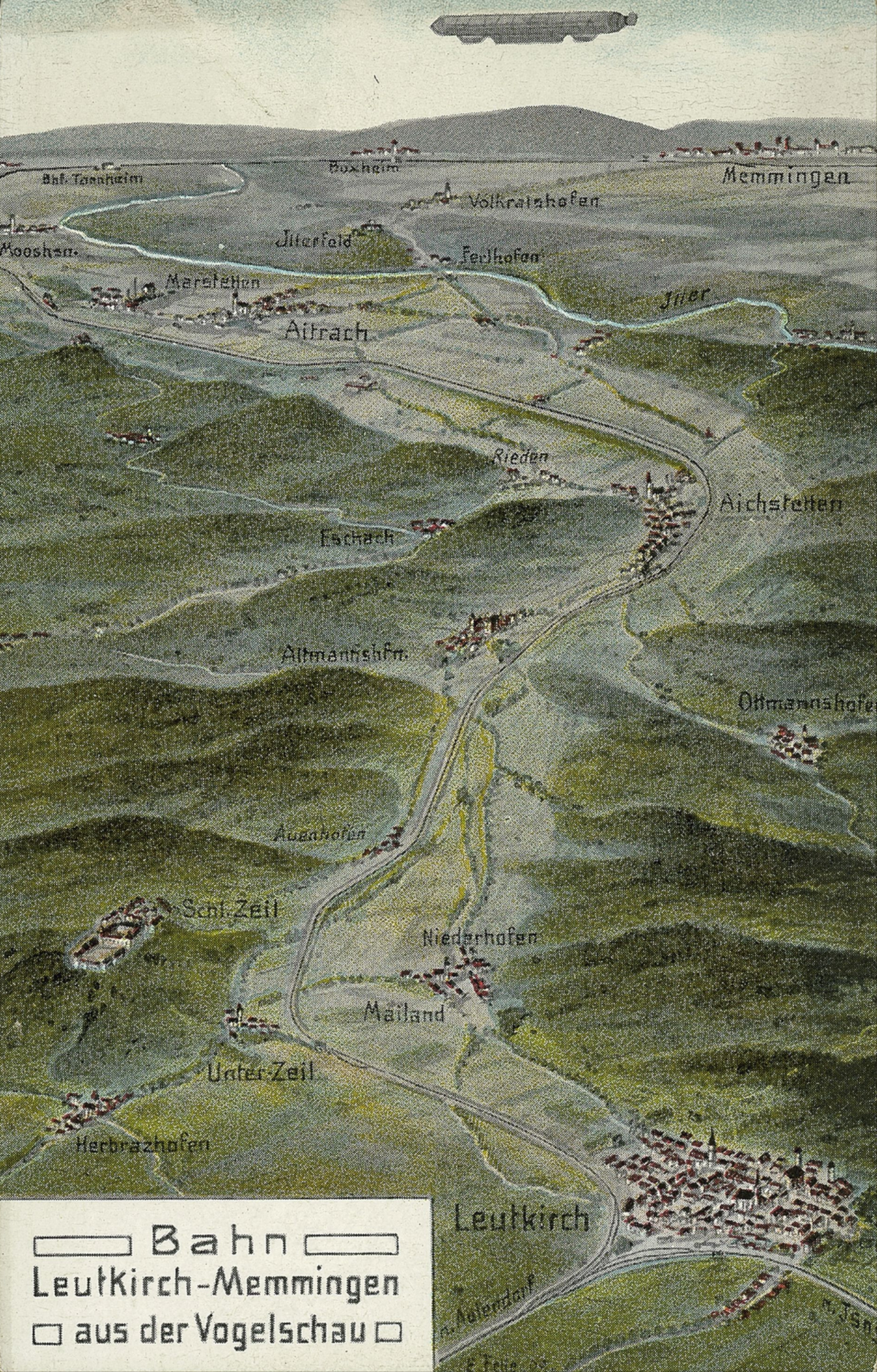
"Bird's eye view of Leutkirch–Memmingen railway“, postcard by Eugen Felle, 1909

The railway line connecting the two endpoints of Leutkirch im Allgäu and Memmingen is not direct, but instead has two long curves.

At the start of the line at Leutkirch station it turns northwest to the now disused Unterzeil station and then swings back sharply to the northeast towards Memmingen, passing through the stations of Altmannshofen and Aichstetten. This curve came about due to the interest of the Earl of Waldburg-Zeil in having a rail link to Unterzeil, which lies below Zeil Castle. Aichstetten Shell siding is served daily by tankers hauled by private locomotives.

Shortly after Aichstetten, the line turns north again and runs directly line to the stations of Marstetten-Aitrach, Mooshausen, which has been disused since the 1970s, and Tannheim. At Tannheim the track takes another sharp turn to the east and crosses the Iller on a large viaduct; at this point the border runs along the river. On the Bavarian side the line passes through Buxheim station, which is now also closed, before making a wide curve to the south of Memmingen, the end of the line. Even this so-called Tannheim Arc (Tannheimer Bogen) has political origins: the route was originally selected at the wishes of the Earl of Waldbott von Bassenheim of Buxheim and the Earl of Schaesberg in Tannheim, who also wanted connections to the railway.

== Operations ==
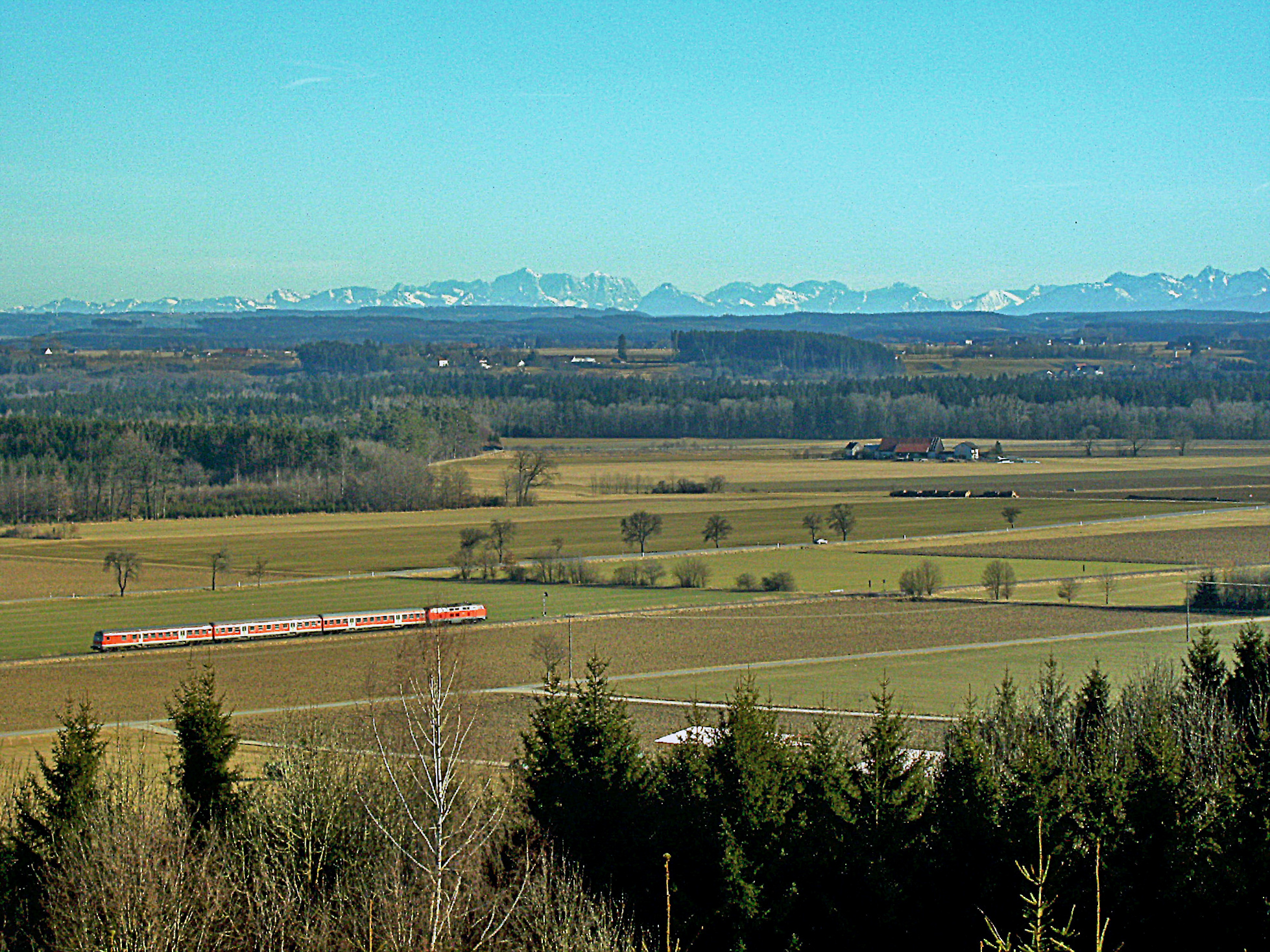
Between Memmingen and Mooshausen

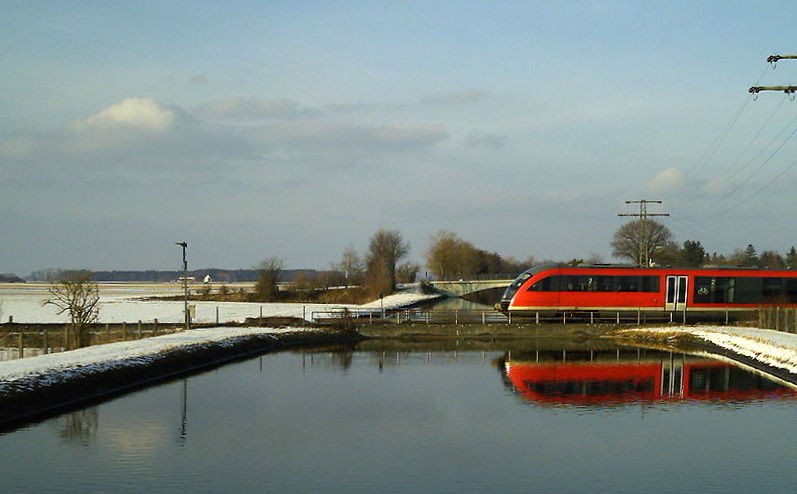
Railway bridge over the Iller canal near Tannheim

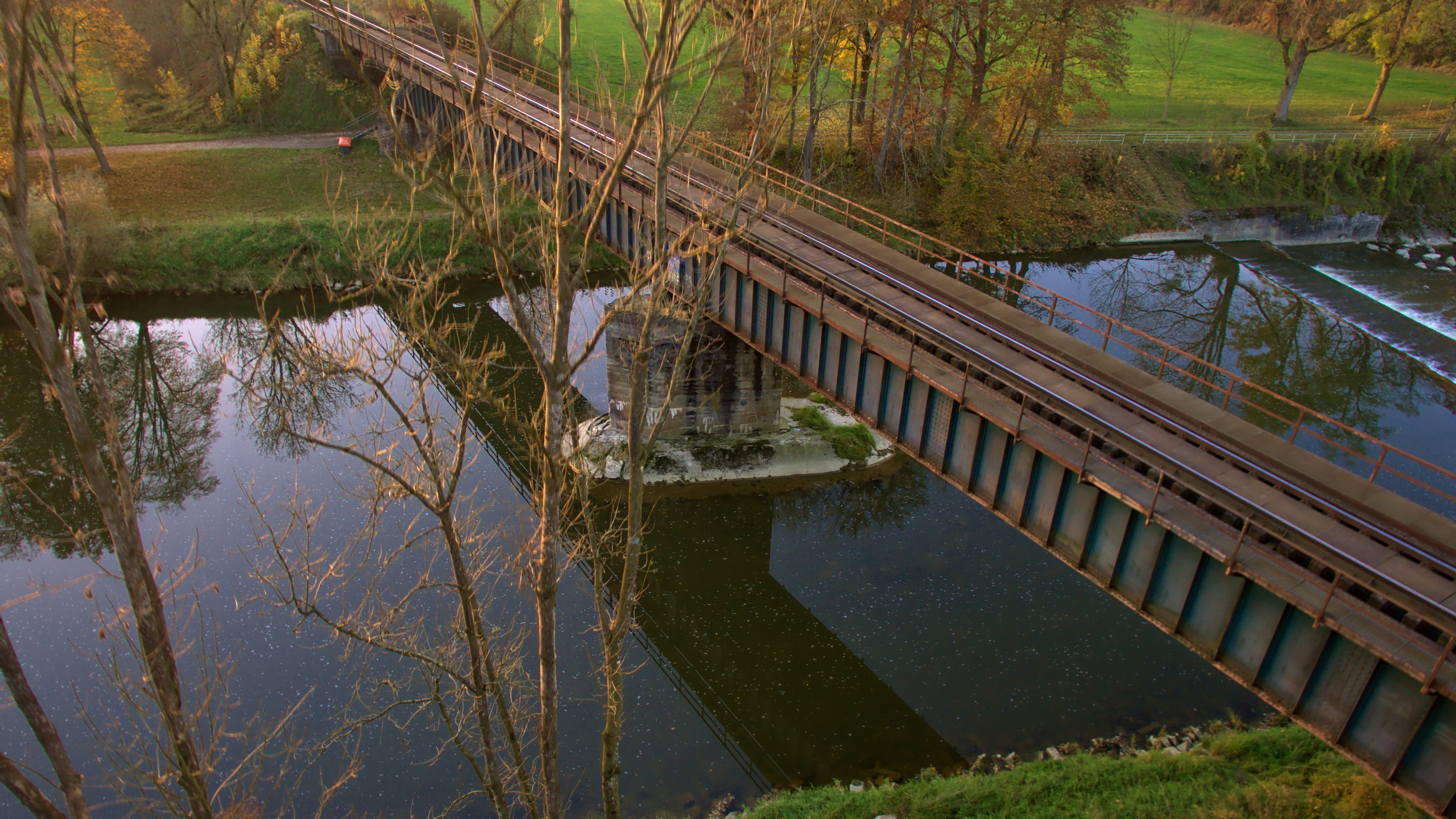
Buxheim railway bridge

The line is served by two services operated by Go-Ahead Bayern, the RE 96 (Munich–Buchloe–Memmingen–Kißlegg–Wangen–Hergatz–Lindau-Insel–Lindau-Reutin) and the RB 92 (Memmingen–Kißlegg–Wangen–Hergatz–Lindau-Insel). Both services run every two hours, together providing an hourly service to all stations. Six pairs of EuroCity-Express services also run over the line on the Zürich–Bregenz–Lindau-Reutin–Buchloe–Munich route, only stopping at Memmingen.

=== Freight ===
From 1958 to 1995, 200 tons of oil from the oil field of Mönchsrot was loaded daily at Tannheim station on tanker cars and carried to Memmingen. In the summer season gravel trains run and trains also serve the large Shell tank farm in Aichstetten-Altmann, which forms part of the German strategic oil reserve.
