= Altshausen station =

Railway station in Altshausen, Germany

Altshausen
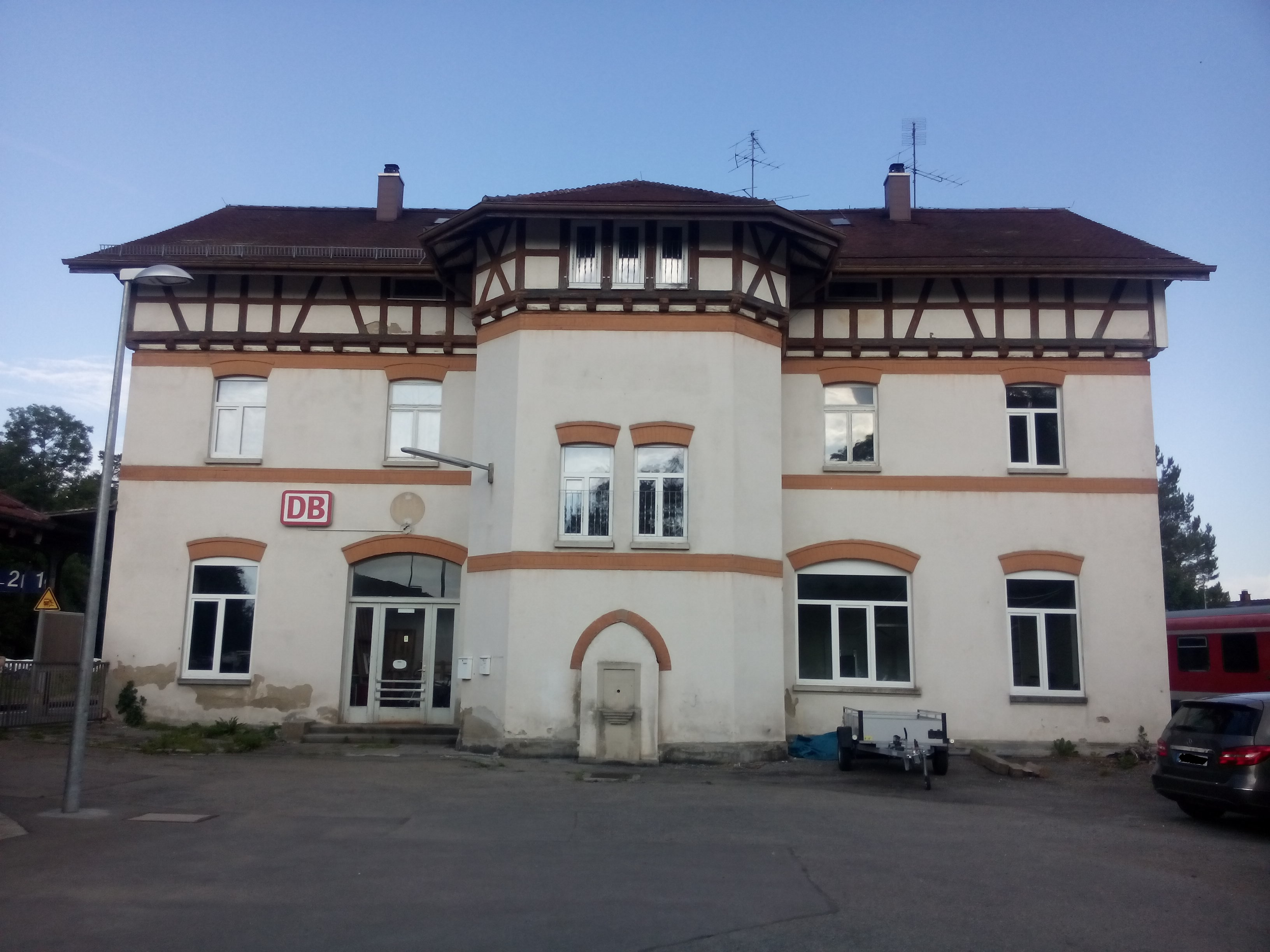
- 2017

General information
- Location: Bahnhofstraße; 88361 Altshausen; Baden-Württemberg; Germany
- Coordinates: 47.9306°N 9.5514°E
- Elevation: 573 m (1,880 ft)
- System: Keilbahnhof
- Owner: Deutsche Bahn
- Operator: DB Station&Service
- Lines: Herbertingen–Isny railway (KBS 753); Altshausen–Schwackenreute railway (KBS 754)
- Platforms: 2 side platforms
- Tracks: 3
- Train operators: DB Regio Baden-Württemberg

Construction
- Parking: yes
- Cycle facilities: yes
- Accessible: partly

Other information
- Station code: 130
- DS100 code: TAT
- IBNR: 8000559
- Category: 6
- Fare zone: bodo: 48; DING: 248 (bodo transitional tariff); naldo: 804 (bodo transitional tariff)
- Website: www.bahnhof.de

Services
Preceding station	DB Regio Baden-Württemberg	Following station
Bad Saulgau towards Stuttgart Hbf	RE 6a	Aulendorf Terminus
Bad Saulgau towards Albstadt-Ebingen	RB 53	Aulendorf Terminus
Hoßkirch Königseggsee towards Pfullendorf	RB 54 Limited service	Aulendorf Terminus
Location
- Location within Baden-Württemberg Location within Germany Location within Europe

Altshausen station is a railway station in the municipality of Altshausen, located in the Ravensburg district in Baden-Württemberg, Germany.
