= Ravensburg station =

Railway station in Ravensburg, Germany

Ravensburg
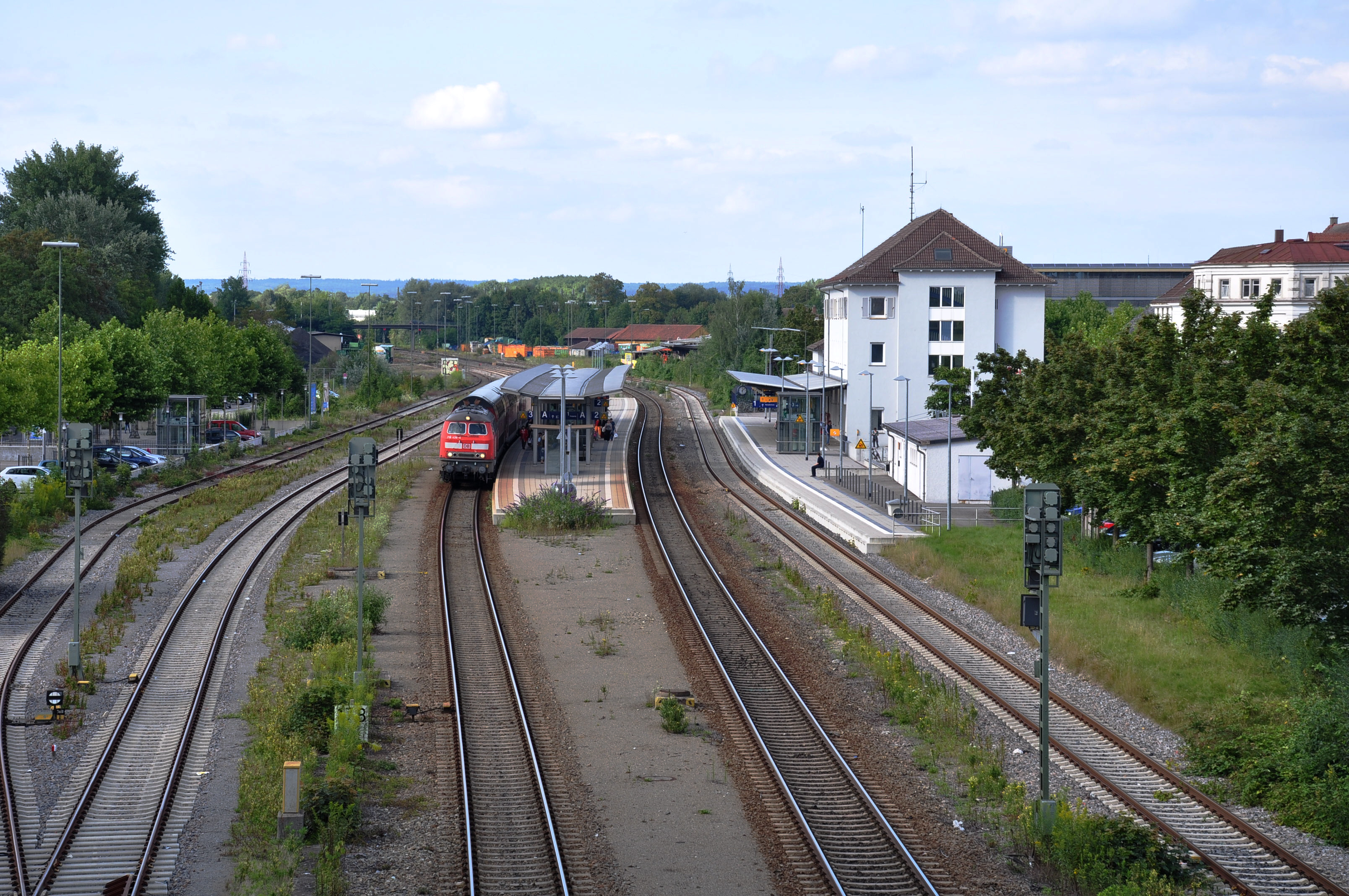
- 2011

General information
- Location: Bahnhofplatz 5; 88214 Ravensburg; Baden-Württemberg; Germany
- Coordinates: 47°47′05″N 9°36′22″E
- Elevation: 431 m (1,414 ft)
- Owner: Deutsche Bahn
- Operator: DB Netz; DB Station&Service
- Lines: Ulm–Friedrichshafen (KBS 751)
- Platforms: 1 island platform 1 side platform
- Tracks: 5
- Train operators: Bodensee-Oberschwaben-Bahn; DB Fernverkehr; DB Regio Baden-Württemberg
- Connections: Bus interchange

Construction
- Accessible: Yes

Other information
- Station code: 5150
- DS100 code: TRB
- IBNR: 8004965
- Category: 4
- Fare zone: bodo: 230
- Website: www.bahnhof.de

Services
Preceding station	DB Fernverkehr	Following station
Biberach (Riß) towards Dortmund Hbf	ICE 62 Bodensee	Friedrichshafen Stadt towards Innsbruck Hbf
Preceding station	DB Regio Baden-Württemberg	Following station
Aulendorf towards Ulm Hbf	RE 3	Friedrichshafen Flughafen towards Lindau-Reutin
Aulendorf towards Ulm Hbf	RE 3 Limited service	Meckenbeuren towards Kressbronn
Aulendorf towards Stuttgart Hbf	RE 5	Meckenbeuren towards Lindau-Reutin
Preceding station	Bodensee-Oberschwaben-Bahn	Following station
Weißenau towards Aulendorf	RB 91	Weingarten Berg towards Friedrichshafen Hafen
Location

Ravensburg station is a railway station in the municipality of Ravensburg, located in the Ravensburg district in Baden-Württemberg, Germany.
