= Wendlingen (Neckar) station =

Railway station in Germany

Wendlingen (Neckar)
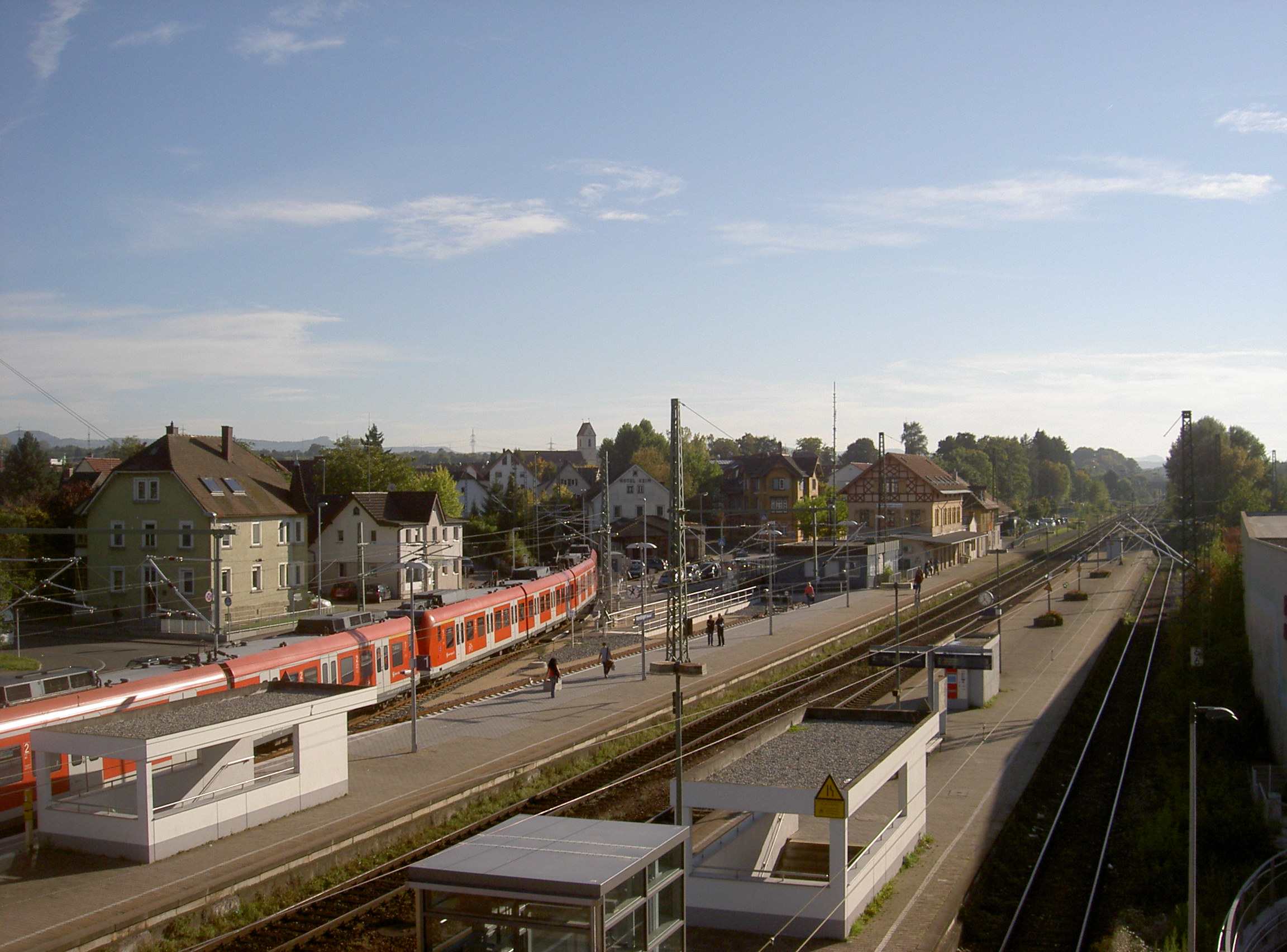

General information
- Location: Bahnhofstr. 15; Wendlingen; Baden-Württemberg; Germany
- Coordinates: 48°40′23″N 9°22′24″E
- Lines: Plochingen–Immendingen railway; Teck Railway; Wendlingen-Ulm (KBS 750.1)
- Platforms: 5

Construction
- Accessible: Yes

Other information
- Station code: 6671
- DS100 code: TWD
- IBNR: 8006331
- Category: 4
- Fare zone: : 4
- Website: www.bahnhof.de

History
- Former names: Unterboihingen

Services
Preceding station	Stuttgart S-Bahn	Following station
Wernau (Neckar) towards Herrenberg	S1	Kirchheim (Teck)-Ötlingen towards Kirchheim (Teck)
Preceding station	DB Regio Baden-Württemberg	Following station
Terminus	RE 200	Merklingen - Schwäbische Alb towards Ulm Hbf
Preceding station	(Stuttgart)	Following station
Oberboihingen towards Tübingen Hbf	MEX 12	Plochingen towards Mosbach-Neckarelz
Nürtingen towards Tübingen Hbf	MEX 18	Plochingen towards Osterburken
Location

Wendlingen (Neckar) station (formerly Unterboihingen station) is the only station in the town of Wendlingen in the German state of Baden-Württemberg and is a railway junction on the Plochingen–Immendingen railway from which the Teck Railway branches. It is served by regional trains and the Stuttgart S-Bahn.

== History ==
On 20 September 1859 the Royal Württemberg State Railways opened the Plochingen–Reutlingen line, the first section of the Upper Neckar Railway. Its first stop after Plochingen was Unterboihingen station, which was about 700 metres north of Unterboihingen village.

As a connection to the district of Kirchheim was not under consideration by the State Railways, the city council sought on 13 August 1860 permission for a private railway company to build the connection. The railway would run from Unterboihingen to Kirchheim. On 12 August 1863 the Württemberg State Parliament approved its construction. The starting point of the eastward running line was at the Hotel Keim, which had a platform. On 21 September 1864 the Kirchheim Railway Company (Kirchheimer Eisenbahn-Gesellschaft) commenced operations. On 1 January 1899, the Royal Württemberg State Railways took over the Teck Railway (Teckbahn). In 1902, a second track was added to the Plochingen–Reutlingen section.

In 1913, the director of the Behr Company, who had been a resident in Wendlingen for a year, sought to have the station renamed as "Unterboihingen-Wendlingen". The community in Wendlingen supported him. The State Railway Board refused, however, and even pointed out that if there was a name change, it would be called after the larger town of Köngen. Double names could also only be used in exceptional cases. After the Württemberg State Railways was absorbed into the Deutsche Reichsbahn, Wendlingen asked the Railway Administration (Reichsbahndirektion) in Stuttgart to rename the station after the town on 25 April 1921. Meanwhile, Köngen and Wendlingen had become almost equal in population and Pfauhausen-Steinbach station had been given a double name without complaint. Nevertheless, the Stuttgart Railway Administration again denied the request. Again on 30 November 1927, the Railway Administration pointed to Wendlingen's disadvantage in size compared to Köngen. In 1933 the deputy mayor of Wendlingen pointed out to the Railway Administration that Wendlingen and Unterboihingen had grown together and that Wendlingen had about 3,000 inhabitants compared to Unterboihingen with 1,100 inhabitants. On 1 April 1940, the communities of Wendlingen, Unterboihingen and Bodelshofen merged and the station received its present name of Wendlingen (Neckar).

After the Second World War, on 20 October 1946, the citizens of Unterboihingens petitioned the Baden-Württemberg Ministry of the Interior to disincorporate from Wendlingen. A long dispute followed. On 11 December 1950, as a compromise, the Ministry of the Interior suggested that the station be renamed Wendlingen-Unterboihingen. Wendlingen had little sympathy for this and it did not satisfy the representatives of Unterboihingen. Tempers eventually calmed down.

Already in the 1970s, the Deutsche Bundesbahn planned the continuation of the S-Bahn from Plochingen to Kirchheim. Implementation, however, lasted for several decades and work only commenced on 23 July 2008. S-Bahn line S1 has operated on the Teck Railway since 12 December 2009.

== Entrance building ==
The station building was constructed in 1859 and its two annexes still exist. The ground floor, which has arched windows and doors, is made of sandstone. The upper floor, where an official residence was located, is painted light beige. The walls under the eaves is decorated with half-timbered elements.

In September 1900, the building was given a single-storey extension towards the south. In it were a room for the traffic controller and a post office. In 1902, it was connected with the telegraph network.

After the extension for the post office was no longer sufficient, it got a new extension to the south, a two-storey building with a hipped roof and wood panelling on the upper floor facade.

The last renovation was on the north side of the entrance building, which has a sign with the name “Wendlingen (Neckar)”, while the south side has a sign with the name “Unterboihingen”.

== Rail services ==
The station has five platform tracks. Track 1 is next to the station building and is used by regional trains towards Plochingen. Track 2 is used by trains towards Nürtingen. Track 3 is also used by regional trains towards Nürtingen. Track 11 is served by S-Bahn to Kirchheim and is connected to the main platform (track 1). Track 12 is served by S-Bahn trains to Plochingen.

Wendlingen (Neckar) station is classified by Deutsche Bahn as a category 4 station.

=== Regional services ===
Line		Frequency
RE 200	Wendlingen – Merklingen – Schwäbische Alb – Ulm Hbf	60 minutes
MEX 12	Stuttgart – Bad Cannstatt – Esslingen (Neckar) – Plochingen – Wendlingen – Nürtingen – Metzingen – Reutlingen – Tübingen	60 minutes
MEX 18	Plochingen – Wendlingen – Nürtingen – Metzingen – Reutlingen – Tübingen – Herrenberg	60 minutes

=== S-Bahn ===
Line	Route
S 1	Kirchheim (Teck) – Wendlingen – Plochingen – Esslingen – Neckarpark – Bad Cannstatt – Hauptbahnhof – Schwabstraße – Vaihingen – Rohr – Böblingen – Herrenberg
