= Ulm–Friedrichshafen railway =

Railway line in Baden-Württemberg, Germany

Coordinates: 47°54′10″N 9°40′36″E

Ulm Hbf–Friedrichshafen railway
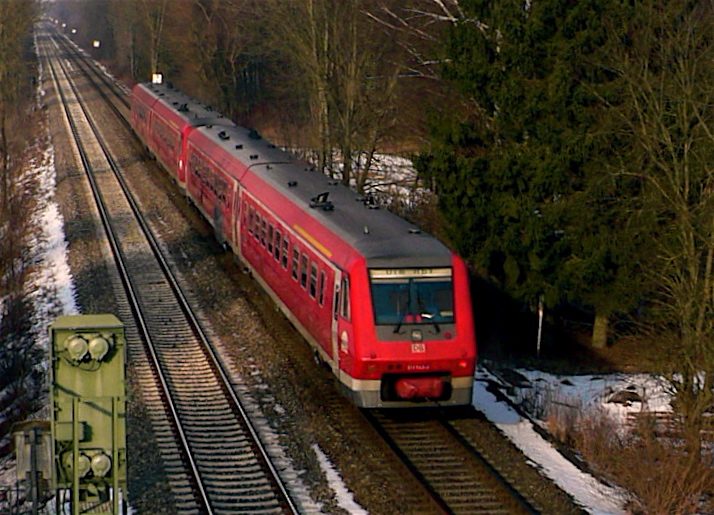
- IRE-Sprinter near Ravensburg

Overview
- Native name: Württembergische Südbahn
- Line number: 751

Service
- Route number: 4500

Technical
- Line length: 103.6 km (64.4 mi)
- Number of tracks: 2
- Track gauge: 1,435 mm (4 ft 8 1/2 in) standard gauge
- Electrification: 15 kV/16.7 Hz AC overhead catenary
- Operating speed: 160 km/h (99 mph) (maximum)
Route map
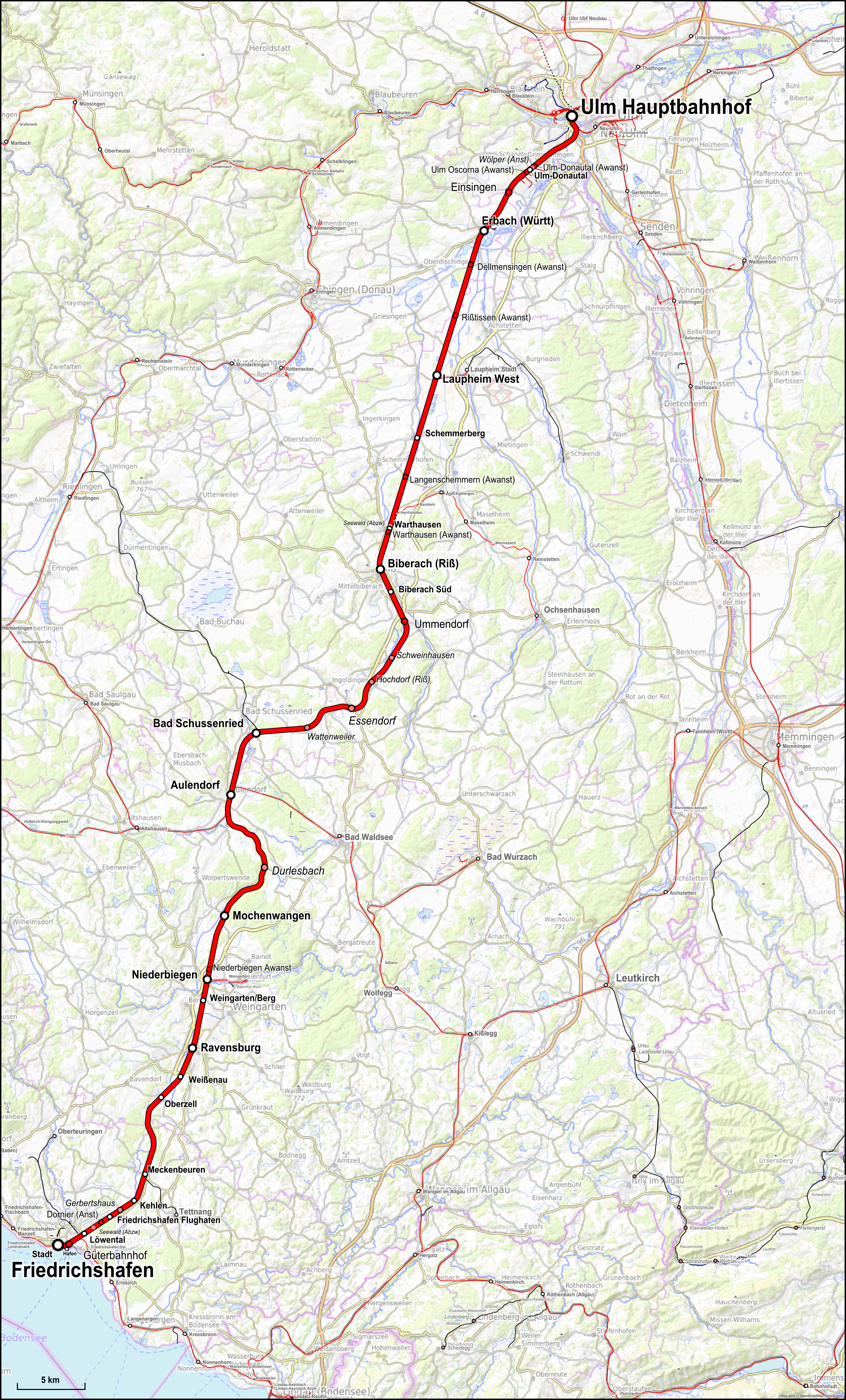
- Source: German railway atlas

The Ulm–Friedrichshafen railway, also known as the Württembergische Südbahn (Württemberg Southern Railway), is an electrified main line in the state of Baden-Württemberg, southern Germany. It was built from 1846 to 1850 and doubled from 1905 to 1913. During that time many of the station buildings were rebuilt. Its kilometre numbering (chainage) begins as the Fils Valley Railway in Stuttgart Hbf. The line was upgraded and electrified from the spring of 2018. Electric operations commenced in December 2021.

The line begins in Ulm and runs via Biberach an der Riß, Aulendorf and Ravensburg to Friedrichshafen. Some trains continue on the single-tracked line of the Friedrichshafen–Lindau railway to Lindau.

== History ==
Under the technical direction of the civil engineer Ludwig Friedrich Gaab, commissioners Ludwig August von Autenrieth and Georg von Buhler examined a transport link between Ulm and Friedrichshafen from 1836. As an alternative, a canal link was considered using the Riss and Schussen rivers, which compared to a two-track railway connection was expected to have slightly higher construction costs but much lower operational costs. With the act entitled Über den Bau von Eisenbahnen (on the construction of railways) of 18 April 1843, the Kingdom of Württemberg finally decided to build several railway lines that could be considered as the Northern, Western, Eastern and Southern Railway and would cover the most urgent transport needs of the kingdom.

The Southern Railway was part of a continuous railway line from the navigable Neckar in Heilbronn via Stuttgart and Ulm to Friedrichshafen on Lake Constance. The examination of different route alternatives selected a direct connection from Ulm to Friedrichshafen.

The first isolated section of the line opened on 8 November 1847 between Friedrichshafen and Ravensburg. On 26 May 1849 this was followed by the section to Biberach an der Riss and on 1 June 1850 by the remaining section to Ulm. Initially, with a locomotive transported by horse-drawn wagons and nine wagons, a freight train carrying passengers ran as an island operation. As a result, Friedrichshafen had its own workshop from the beginning, since there was no connection to the railway's Eßlinger workshop.

With the closing the gap of the Ulm–Geislingen section of the Fils Valley Railway from Stuttgart on 29 June 1850, the Royal Württemberg State Railways (Königlich Württembergischen Staats-Eisenbahnen or K.W.St.E.) won the race to Lake Constance, three years before the Royal Bavarian State Railways and thirteen years before the Grand Duchy of Baden State Railway.

Between 1905 and 1913, the Ulm–Friedrichshafen line was duplicated for military reasons.

=== 1945–2011 ===
Several stations that were located far away from the villages were closed down in the years after the Second World War. Similarly, all the branches with passenger services off the line were closed, with the exception of the Aulendorf–Herbertingen and Aulendorf–Kißlegg lines.

Beginning in the 1990s, InterRegio trains operated between Saarbrücken and Lindau on the line. From 1 July 1993, class NE81 diesel railbuses were operated between Friedrichshafen and Ravensburg by the Bodensee-Oberschwaben-Bahn (Lake Constance–Upper Swabia Railway, BOB), founded on 15 October 1991 and using equipment and personnel supplied by other railway companies under contract. Services were extended on 1 July 1997 to Aulendorf. This had become popularly known as the Geißbockbahn (billy goat railway); this description comes from a folk song, Auf de Schwäb'sche Eisenbahne, first published in the late 19th century. As early as 1994, high demand led BOB to procure additional vehicles, including wagons leased from Hohenzollerischen Landesbahn ("Hohenzollern State Railway", HzL). Some of the disused stations have been reactivated. Stadler Regio-Shuttle RS1 diesel railcars were operated on the line from autumn 1998 to cater for the increased traffic, but these were replaced by electric sets in December 2021.

DB ZugBus Regionalverkehr Alb-Bodensee (DB RAB) took over the operation of local passenger services on the northern section of the line and now operates all regional services on the line except for the BOB service, which it operates under contract. In 1999, the Laupheim West–Laupheim Stadt branch line, the last remaining section of the Laupheim West–Schwendi line, was reactivated, with services connecting to Langenau.

=== Since 2001 ===
In 2001, InterRegio services were abandoned except for a pair of trains cut back to operate between Karlsruhe and Ulm. With the abolition of this type of train in late 2002, the remaining InterRegio train pair was replaced by an InterCity service on the Münster/Dortmund–Lindau–Innsbruck route.

As a replacement for the Interregio services, the Interregio-Express (IRE) train class was introduced on 15 December 2002.

In July 2008, Biberach district and Deutsche Bahn decided to build an about 400 metre-long connecting curve from the line to the existing line from Laupheim West to Laupheim Stadt (town) station. This allows direct services to run from Biberach via Laupheim Stadt (where trains reverse) to Ulm. Construction work on this started in June 2009 and was completed in 2011. As part of this upgrade, the entire signal system in Laupheim West station was modernised.

The Regionalverband Donau-Iller (Danube-Iller Regional Association) has proposed the upgrade of the Ulm–Biberach–Aulendorf section as part of the Regio-S-Bahn Donau-Iller (Danube-Iller Regional S-Bahn).

In addition, the construction of a new connection to the Ulm–Sigmaringen railway from Erbach to Ehingen was investigated in the course of planning for the Regio-S-Bahn Donau-Iller but was discarded.

To compensate for the impact on the timetable of building Merklingen (Schwäbische Alb) station on the Wendlingen–Ulm high-speed railway, €3 million was earmarked for upgrades on the Southern Railway. Due to the additional stop, the travel time for regional trains between Stuttgart, Ulm and Friedrichshafen would be extended by two minutes.

==== Electrification of the line ====
After some years of planning and negotiations between Deutsche Bahn and the state and federal governments, the ground-breaking ceremony for the electrification of the line was held in spring 2017 at the site of a new substation to be built in Niederbiegen.

The financing agreement between Baden-Württemberg and Deutsche Bahn was signed shortly before Christmas 2015. The state agreed to take over half of the eligible costs—up to €112.5 million of €225 million. The electrification was to be completed by the end of 2021. A corresponding agreement was to be concluded between the state and the federal government. It was agreed that after electrification of the line, an hourly Oberschwaben-Express would run between Stuttgart and Lindau, along with an hourly express between Ulm and Friedrichshafen. Regio-S-Bahn services would run every half hour between Ulm and Biberach.

Since December 2021, parts of the route can be operated at 160 km/h rather than 140 km/h. The travel time between Ulm and Friedrichshafen was reduced from 72 minutes in 2017 to 64 minutes.

Regional-Express trains between Ulm and Friedrichshafen run approximately every half hour. The former Basel–Ulm service, which is operated with tilting diesel multiple units, has ended in Friedrichshafen since the electrification of the line north of Friedrichshafen. With electrification, the regional transport service was increased by around 30 percent in train-kilometres. With a few exceptions, only electric trains have run on the line since. Diesel vehicles only operate as part of transfer trips to the workshop in Ulm.

== Operations ==
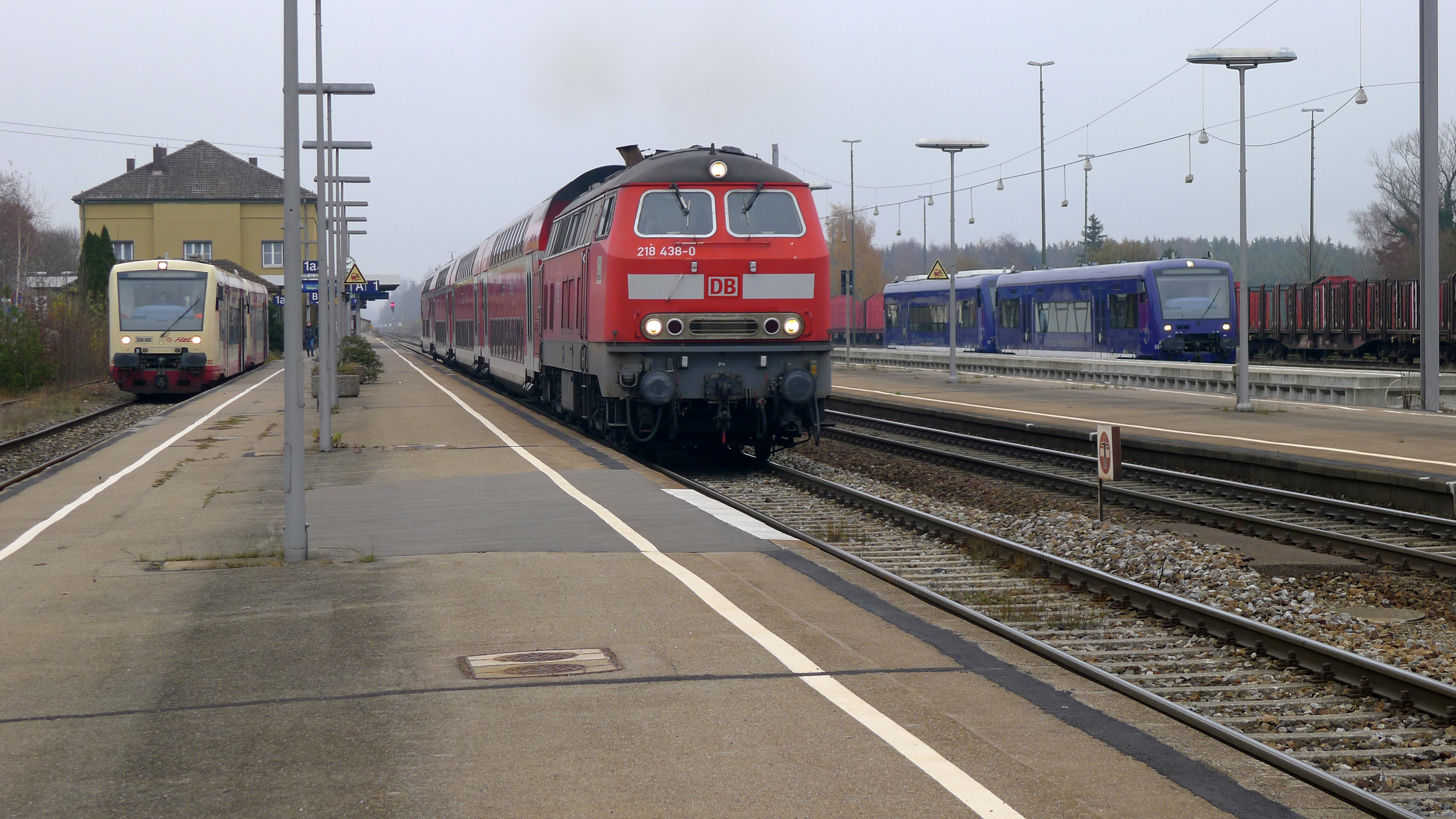
Aulendorf station in 2011 with trains of three different companies

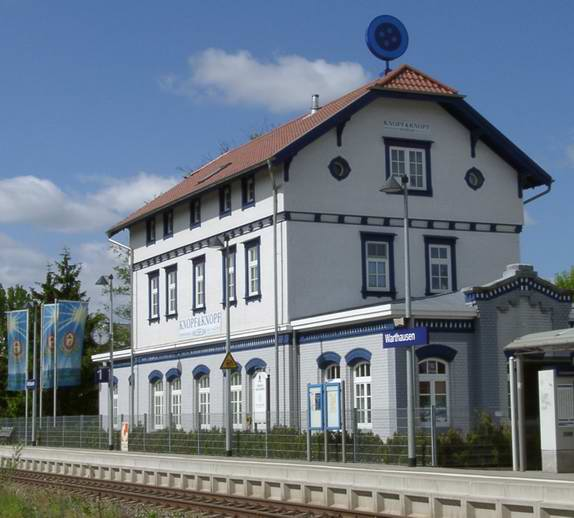
Former entrance building at Warthausen station, now a button museum

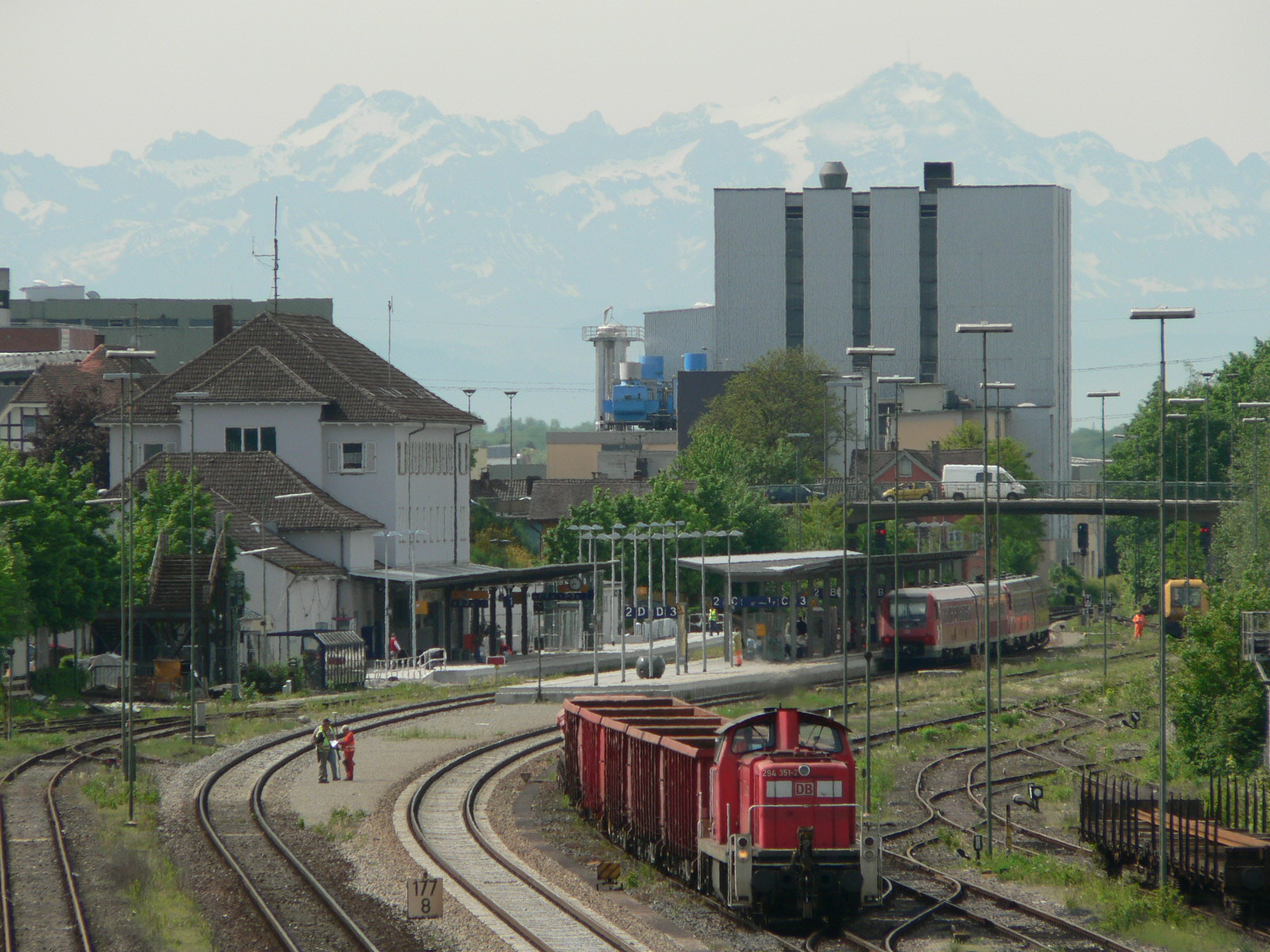
Trains in Ravensburg station

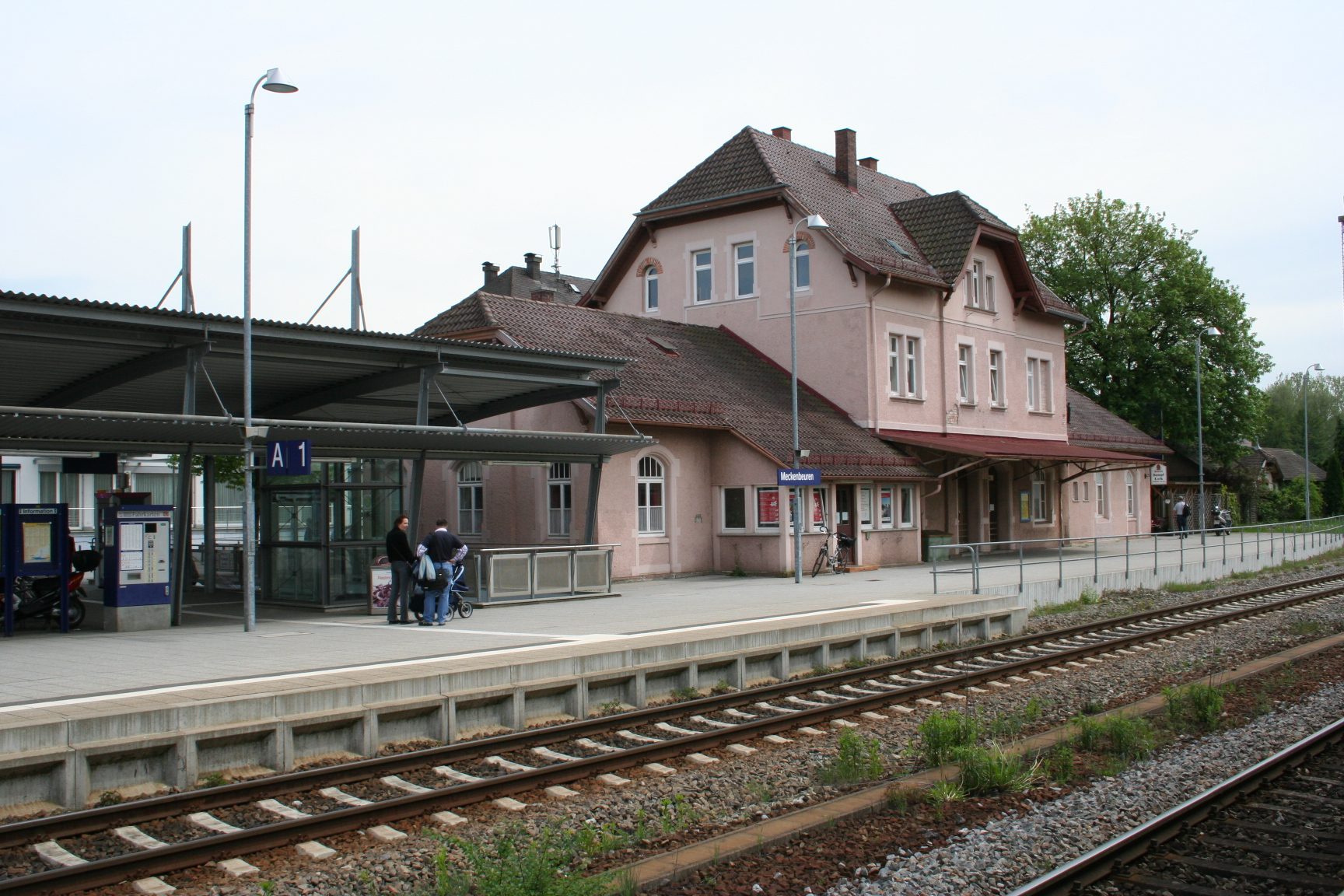
Meckenbeuren station

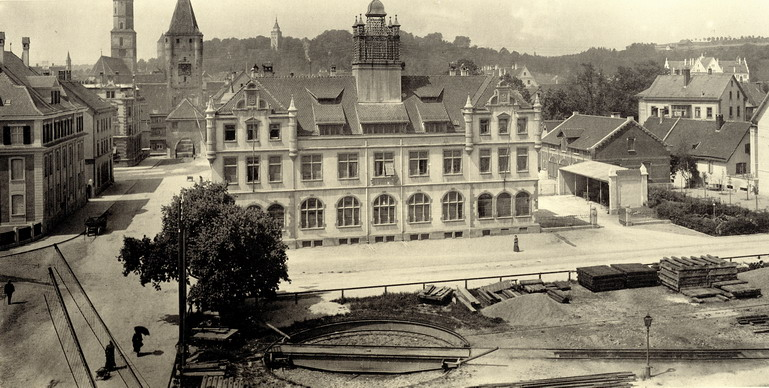
Turntable at Biberach an der Riß station around 1904 (in front of the post office)

The regional services ran on the line on the basis of an underlying transport contract between the state and DB Regio, which ended in 2016. Bids for a successor contract were called at the end December 2014 and it was awarded to DB Regio again in March 2016. Although the contract, which runs until 2023, entered into force in December 2016, it was only signed on 16 January 2017.

The line is now served only by electric services. The line is served by one Intercity services each day: a pair of Intercity Express services running between Dortmund and Innsbruck (218/219).

Line	Route	Frequency
ICE 62	Dortmund – Essen – Düsseldorf – Köln Messe/Deutz – Frankfurt Airport – Mannheim – Heidelberg – Stuttgart – Ulm – Biberach – Ravensburg – Friedrichshafen Stadt – Lindau-Reutin – Bregenz – Bludenz – St. Anton am Arlberg – Innsbruck	1 train pair

It is also served by the following regional services:

Line	Route	Frequency
RE 5	Stuttgart – Plochingen – Ulm – Aulendorf – Ravensburg – Friedrichshafen Stadt – Lindau-Reutin	Hourly
RE 3	Ulm – Aulendorf – Ravensburg – Friedrichshafen Stadt	Hourly
RS 21	Ulm – Laupheim West – Laupheim Stadt – Biberach (Riß) – Biberach (Riß) Süd	Hourly
RS 2	Ulm – Laupheim West – Biberach (Riß) – Biberach (Riß) Süd	Extra peak services
RB 91	Aulendorf – Ravensburg – Friedrichshafen – Friedrichshafen Hafen	Hourly

=== Transport associations ===
From Ulm to Aulendorf the line is within the Donau–Iller Local Transport Network (Donau-Iller-Nahverkehrsverbund, DING ). From Aulendorf to Friedrichshafen it is within the Lake Constance–Upper Swabia Transport Association (Bodensee-Oberschwaben Verkehrsverbund, BODO).

== See also ==
- History of railways in Württemberg
