= Aulendorf station =

Railway station in Aulendorf, Germany

Aulendorf
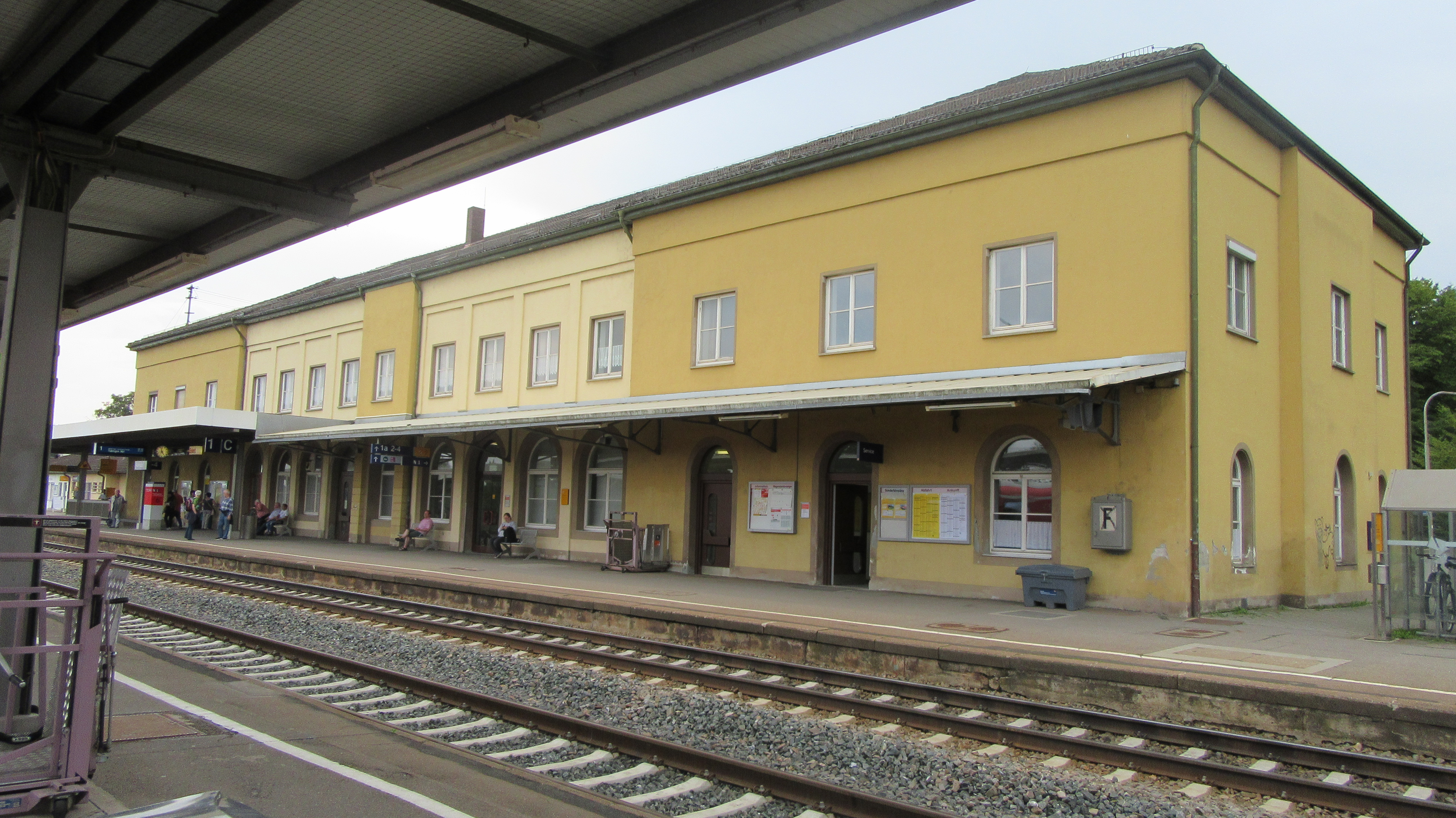
- 2016

General information
- Location: Am Bahnhof 1; 88326 Aulendorf; Baden-Württemberg; Germany
- Coordinates: 47°57′12″N 9°38′38″E
- Elevation: 547 m (1,795 ft)
- Owner: DB Netz
- Operator: DB Station&Service
- Lines: Ulm–Friedrichshafen (KBS 751); Herbertingen–Aulendorf (KBS 766); Aulendorf–Hergatz (KBS 753)
- Platforms: 2 island platforms 1 side platform
- Tracks: 5
- Train operators: Bodensee-Oberschwaben-Bahn; DB Fernverkehr; DB Regio; SVG Stuttgart

Construction
- Accessible: No

Other information
- Station code: 226
- DS100 code: TAU
- IBNR: 8000014
- Category: 4
- Fare zone: bodo: 49; DING: 249 (bodo transitional tariff); naldo: 805 (bodo transitional tariff)
- Website: www.bahnhof.de

History
- Opened: 1849; 177 years ago

Passengers
- 4100

Services
Preceding station	Bodensee-Oberschwaben-Bahn	Following station
Terminus	RB 91	Mochenwangen towards Friedrichshafen Hafen
Preceding station	DB Regio Baden-Württemberg	Following station
Biberach (Riß) towards Ulm Hbf	RE 3	Ravensburg towards Lindau-Reutin or Basel Bad Bf
Bad Schussenried towards Ulm Hbf	RE 3 Limited service	Ravensburg towards Kressbronn
Altshausen towards Stuttgart Hbf	RE 6a	Terminus
Bad Schussenried towards Stuttgart Hbf	RE 5	Ravensburg towards Lindau-Reutin
Altshausen towards Albstadt-Ebingen	RB 53	Terminus
Terminus	RB 53a	Bad Waldsee towards Leutkirch
Terminus	RB 53b	Bad Waldsee towards Wangen (Allgäu)
Altshausen towards Fridingen	RB 55 Limited service	Terminus
Preceding station	SVG Stuttgart	Following station
Biberach(Riß) towards Singen (Hohentwiel)	FEX	Friedrichshafen Stadt towards Singen (Hohentwiel)
Location
- Location within Baden-Württemberg Location within Germany Location within Europe

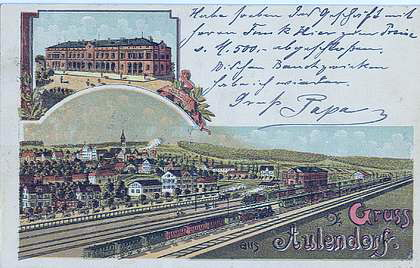
Aulendorf station from a postcard of 1900

Aulendorf station is a junction station on the Ulm–Friedrichshafen railway in the German state of Baden-Württemberg running between Ulm and Friedrichshafen. It was opened in 1847.

== Location ==
The station is located on the eastern edge of the centre of Aulendorf in the district of Ravensburg. On the western side of the station is the central bus station.

== The railway station ==
The station consists of an entrance building and several outbuildings. It has five platform tracks, tracks 1–4 and track 1a (formerly platform 13) to the south of the station.

== History ==
The Royal Württemberg State Railways opened the Friedrichshafen–Ravensburg section of the Ulm–Friedrichshafen railway (Württemberg Southern Railway) in 1847 and extended it through Aulendorf to Biberach on 26 May 1849. The line was electrified in 2021.

In 1869, the Herbertingen–Isny railway was opened and Aulendorf station became the main railway junction in Upper Swabia.

The construction of the railways during a time of great distress in rural Aulendorf kept many people from starvation or emigration. The railway and the post office were the largest employer in Aulendorf at that time.

== Rail services ==
The station is classified by Deutsche Bahn as a category 4 station.

As of December 2025, Aulendorf is the hub of hourly Regional-Express services from Ulm to Friedrichshafen and hourly services towards Sigmaringen. Services run hourly on the Herbertingen–Isny railway alternatively to Hergatz or Kißlegg. Aulendorf is also the starting point of hourly Bodensee-Oberschwaben-Bahn (BOB) services towards Friedrichshafen. In the 2026 timetable, the following long-distance services stopped at the station:

Line	Route		Frequency	Operator
RE 3	Ulm – Aulendorf – Ravensburg – Friedrichshafen	– Lindau-Reutin	Hourly	DB Regio Baden-Württemberg
RE 3	Ulm – Aulendorf – Ravensburg – Friedrichshafen	– Überlingen – Schaffhausen – Basel Bad Bf	One train pair	DB Regio Baden-Württemberg
RE 3	Ulm – Aulendorf – Ravensburg – Friedrichshafen (– Kressbronn)		Some morning trains	DB Regio Baden-Württemberg
RE 5	Stuttgart – Plochingen – Ulm – Aulendorf – Ravensburg – Friedrichshafen (– Lindau-Reutin)		Hourly	DB Regio Baden-Württemberg
RE 6a	Aulendorf – Herbertingen – Sigmaringen – Albstadt-Ebingen – Balingen – Tübingen – Reutlingen – Stuttgart		Every 2 hours	DB Regio Baden-Württemberg
RB 53	Aulendorf – Herbertingen – Sigmaringen – Albstadt-Ebingen		Every 2 hours	DB Regio Baden-Württemberg
RB 53a	Aulendorf – Bad Waldsee – Kißlegg – Wangen (Allgäu) – Leutkirch		Every 2 hours	DB Regio Baden-Württemberg
RB 53b	Aulendorf – Bad Waldsee – Kißlegg – Wangen (Allgäu) – Wangen (Allgäu)		Every 2 hours	DB Regio Baden-Württemberg
RB 55	Aulendorf – Herbertingen – Sigmaringen – Fridingen		One morning service Mo-Fr	DB Regio Baden-Württemberg
RB 91	Aulendorf – Ravensburg – Friedrichshafen – Friedrichshafen Hafen		Hourly	Bodensee-Oberschwaben-Bahn
FEX; Freizeitexpress	Stuttgart – Ulm – Aulendorf – Friedrichshafen – Überlingen Therme – Radolfzell – Singen		One train pair Sa+Su	Schienenverkehrsgesellschaft Stuttgart

=== Freight ===
Aulendorf station is served regularly by freight trains.

== Services in the station ==
The station building has a ticket office, a bakery and a kiosk, but no toilet.
