= Herbertingen–Isny railway =

Non-electrified railway in Baden-Württemberg

Overview
- Native name: Württembergische Allgäubahn
- Status: Leutkirch–Isny not in operation
- Owner: Deutsche Bahn
- Line number: 4550
- Locale: Baden-Württemberg, Germany
- Termini: Herbertingen; Isny
- Stations: 6

Service
- Route number: 752 (Aulendorf–Bad Wurzach); 753 (Sigmaringen–Memmingen/Hergatz); 754 (Aulendorf–Pfullendorf)

History
- Opened: 25 July 1869
- Completed: 15 August 1874

Technical
- Line length: 84.539 km (52.530 mi)
- Number of tracks: 1
- Track gauge: 1,435 mm (4 ft 8 1/2 in) standard gauge
- Minimum radius: 573 m (1,880 ft)
- Electrification: 15 kV 16.7 Hz AC (Kißlegg–Leutkirch)
- Operating speed: 100 km/h (62 mph)
- Signalling: PZB
- Maximum incline: 1.06%

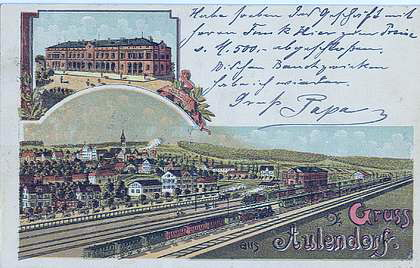
Aulendorf station from a postcard of 1900

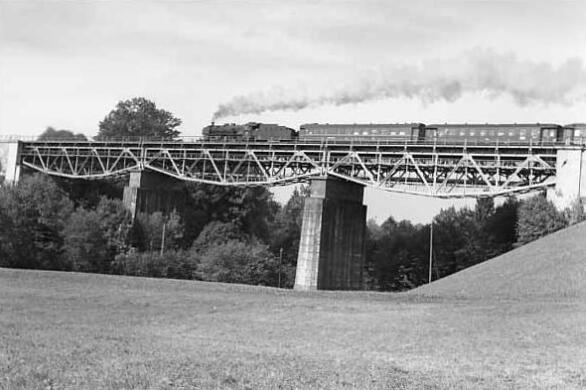
Hämmerle bridge in Hergatz

The Herbertingen–Isny railway (also known in German as the Württembergische Allgäubahn or Württemberg-Allgäu-Bahn—Württemberg Allgäu Railway) is a single-track railway in the German state of Baden-Württemberg. The Leutkirch–Kißlegg section is part of an upgraded long-distance route between Munich and Lindau, which was completed in 2020.

The line is operated by Deutsche Bahn’s subsidiary DB ZugBus Regionalverkehr Alb-Bodensee under contract to Nahverkehrsgesellschaft Baden-Württemberg (NVBW), an agency of the government of Baden-Württemberg responsible for providing public transport.

The line originally connected Herbertingen on the Danube with Isny im Allgäu, but the section from Leutkirch to Isny is closed. Originally it was 84.539 kilometres long and classified as a main line, but the section that is now closed was later reclassified as a branch line. The Kißlegg–Leutkirch section was electrified as part of the upgrading and rerouting of the main line between Munich and Lindau, which was completed in December 2020. The Herbertingen–Aulendorf section used to be part of the so-called Zollernalbbahn (Zollernalb Railway) from Tübingen to Aulendorf.

== History ==
In 1860, a so-called Eisenbahn Comite (railway committee) was established with the aim of having the cities of Leutkirch and Isny connected to the network of the Royal Württemberg State Railways (Königlich Württembergischen Staats-Eisenbahnen). On 13 August 1865, the lower house of the parliament of Württemberg (württembergische Abgeordnetenkammer) finally approved the construction of a line from Herbertingen via Saulgau, Aulendorf, Waldsee, Kißlegg and Leutkirch to Isny. This was opened in five sections as follows:

25 July 1869	Saulgau–Aulendorf–Waldsee	28 km
10 October 1869	Herbertingen–Saulgau	9 km
15 September 1870	Waldsee–Kißlegg	20 km
1 September 1872	Kißlegg–Leutkirch	11 km
15 August 1874	Leutkirch–Isny	16 km

The new line connected with the Ulm–Friedrichshafen railway, running from Ulm to Lake Constance in Aulendorf, making it an important railway junction for Upper Swabia. The line crosses the main European watershed between the Rhine and the Danube at the former Reipertshofen station at a height of 658 metres.

=== Further development ===
After the Leutkirch–Memmingen railway was opened in 1889, the section from Leutkirch to Isny lost its importance in terms of traffic and was consequently reclassified as a branch line in 1890. The last section was always lightly used as few passengers used its en route stations, all three of which were at some distance from the settlements they were intended to serve:

- Urlau station was about 600 metres from the centre of the municipality of the same name,
- Friesenhofen station was about 1300 metres from the centre of the municipality of the same name,
- Aigeltshofen station was about 1000 metres from the centre of the municipality of Rohrdorf. Aigeltshofen itself is only a hamlet.

In addition, the terminus in Isny was about 900 metres from the market square. The last section became more important, at least for freight traffic, when the Wehrmacht began to build the Urlau ammunition factory near the line in the Urlauer Tann forest in 1935. A 2.5 kilometre-long connecting railway was built from Urlau to the grounds of the ammunition factory. Extensive track systems were laid within the restricted area, including five loop tracks. The new infrastructure installed to carry out the numerous shunting movements meant that Urlau station was reclassified from a halt to a full station. Although the siding was dismantled in 1948 at the behest of the French occupation troops, the newly founded Bundeswehr resumed military traffic as early as 1961, although the ammunition was now reloaded onto trucks in Friesenhofen to be transported to the ammunition depot.

A serious accident occurred near Kisslegg on 26 June 1973. A school bus collided with a detached locomotive at a level crossing protected with flashing lights after the bus driver disregarded the flashing light. Seven people were killed and 13 injured.

In Herbertingen, Herbertingen Ort (town) station was opened nearer the centre of the town before the Second World War because the junction station is poorly located. The best-known train on the line was the Kleber-Express, a Heckeneilzug ("hedge express", that is a service that stops at every station in rural areas) from Freiburg to Munich, which ran from 1954 to 2003.

=== Gradual closure of the Leutkirch–Isny section ===
On 1 June 1969 with the beginning of the summer timetable, passenger traffic between Leutkirch and Isny was discontinued and taken over by Bahnbus, the bus division of Deutsche Bundesbahn. The operation of freight traffic ended on the line and the Friesenhofen–Isny section was closed on 30 May 1976, again at the beginning of the summer timetable. Only the Leutkirch–Friesenhofen section continued to operate due to the extensive military traffic to the Urlau ammunition facility. Immediately after the line was cut back, Deutsche Bundesbahn began to build a loading point a little south of Urlau station for military traffic. When it was put into operation on 7 December 1976, the Urlau–Friesenhofen loading point was closed and the ammunition was now reloaded in Urlau. The loading point was also used for civilian traffic. The line to the Urlau loading station was only a siding of Leutkirch station from 1976. Nevertheless, it was extensively renovated between 1990 and 1993. At that time it received both a new track base and new rails, as well as the kilometre boards used on modern main lines in Germany, which replaced the old kilometre stones. At the same time as operations began in the 1990s, military traffic declined with the end of the Cold War. The siding was seldom used and it was closed on 31 December 2001 and it was dismantled in the summer of 2004.

The southern end point of Isny, on the other hand, was still connected to the railway network via the Kempten line until 18 April 1983. The Leutkirch–Isny route is still served by buses on route 7551 operated by DB ZugBus Regionalverkehr Alb-Bodensee. Through tickets can still be purchased from any station in Germany to destinations on the former Leutkirch–Isny line.

In July 2020, the Baden-Württemberg Ministry of Transport announced that the Leutkirch-Isny line would be included in a study on reactivating local rail passenger transport.

=== Integration into the Allgäu-Swabia regular interval timetable ===
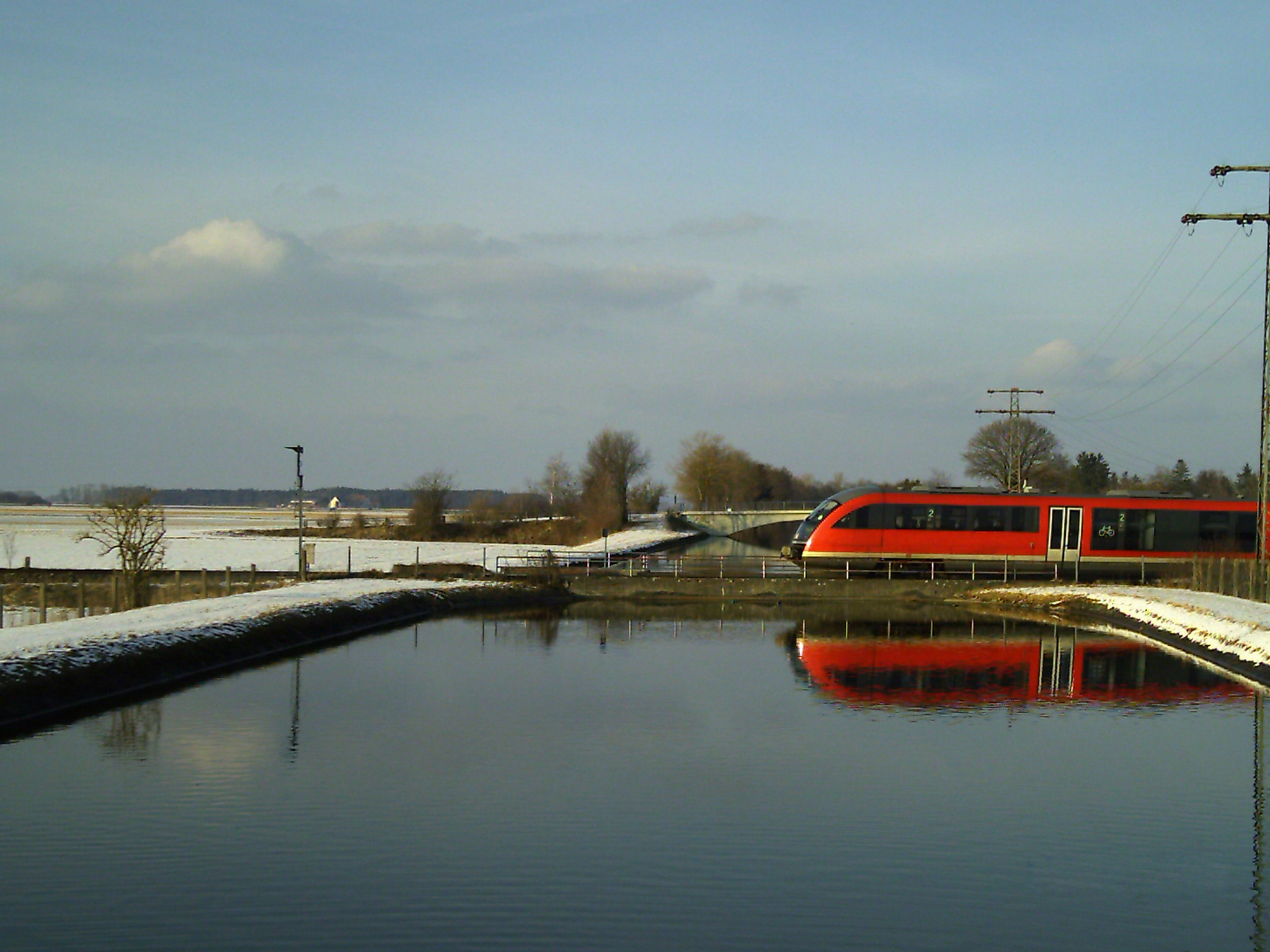
Crossing of the Iller canal

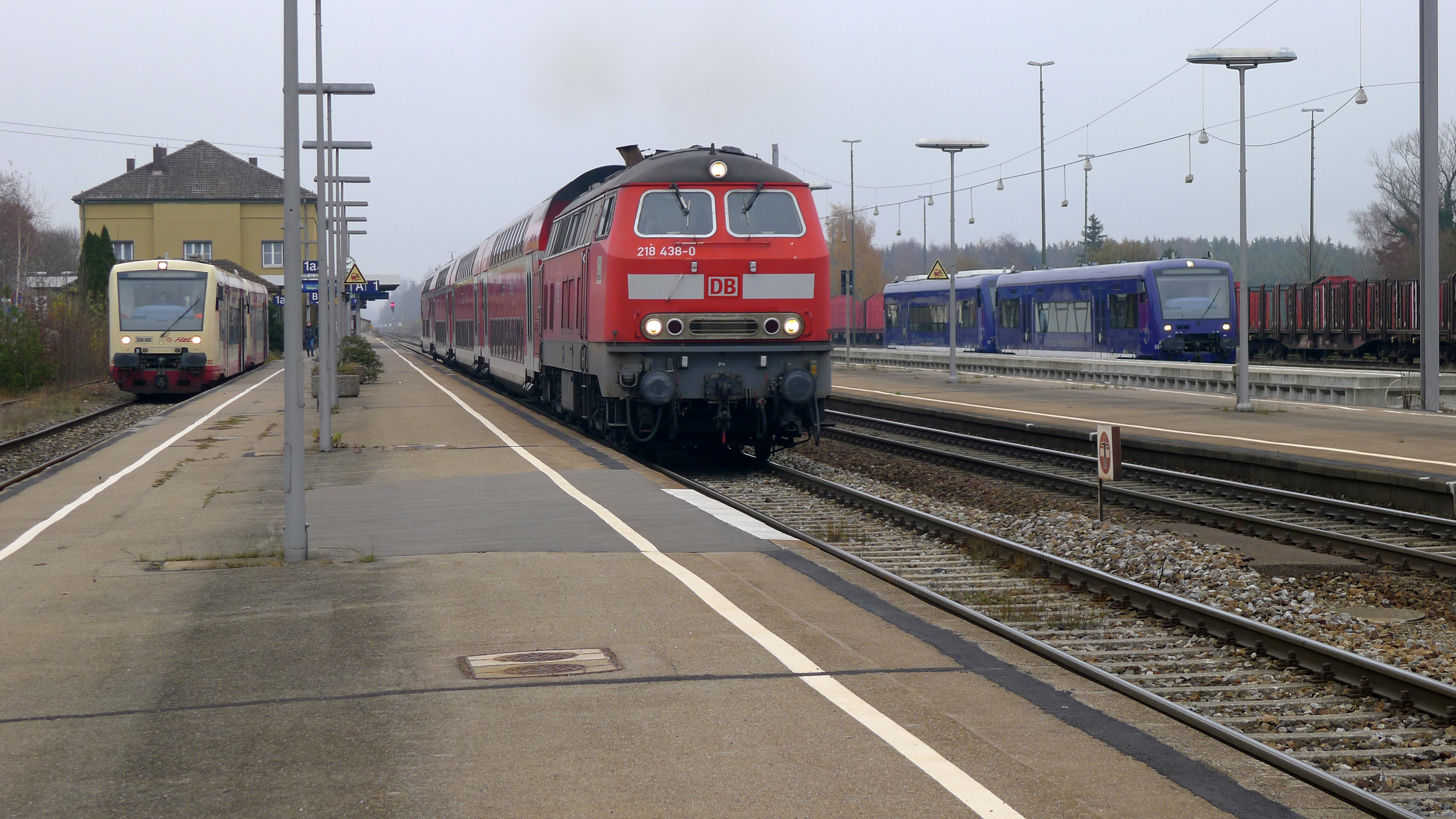
Aulendorf station in 2011 with trains operated by different companies

Under the Allgäu-Swabian regular interval timetable (Allgäu-Schwaben-Takt) introduced in 1993, passenger services on the Aulendorf–Leutkirch–Memmingen route became hourly. In the 2005 timetable services were thinned out to run every two hours—supposedly because of insufficient numbers of passengers. These figures are disputed. Studies show an increase in ridership of 386% on the Aulendorf–Kißlegg–Memmingen route between 1993 and 2003.

Since early 2005, there has been an initiative called Allgäubahn im Stundentakt (hourly services on the Allgäu railway) that aims to restore the hourly service on the line. It achieved a partial success in the timetable change in December 2005, with the restoration of some services for commuters and school transport. In October 2006, the Initiative Allgäubahn was founded to campaign for improvements to the perceived inadequate basic two-hour interval service for the cities and municipalities on the Württemberg Allgäu Railway and the Kißlegg-Memmingen line. The mayor of Kißlegg, Dieter Krattenmacher coordinated the initiative and as a first step commissioned an opinion from the Tübingen-based transport consultant Ulrich Grosse, who proposed a concept with buses no longer running parallel to the railway line, but instead running at right angles to it. This was realised in the 2007/2008 timetable change for Aichstetten and in the summer of 2008 for the Kißlegg/Bad Wurzach area.

Since the timetable change to the winter timetable of 2011/2012, the timetable has returned to an approximately hourly service, but there remain gaps in the less busy times of the day. Baden-Württemberg's new Minister of Transport, Winfried Hermann has continued to finance the additional services that are required because of the loss of revenue due to the failure of tilting technology, among other things.

== Freight ==
In the 21st century, freight transport has been limited mainly to the delivery of raw materials for the Saint-Gobain glass plant in Bad Wurzach, with trains continuing over the Roßberg Railway. Gravel trains also operate in the summer and the Shell tank farm in Aichstetten-Altmann Mayrhofen is also served.

== Sources ==
- Peter-Michael Mihailesch; Matthias Michalke (1985). Vergessene Bahnen in Baden-Württemberg (in German). Stuttgart. ISBN 3-8062-0413-6.
- Thomas Scherer (1981). Eisenbahnen in Württemberg. Die württembergische Allgäubahn (in German). Vol. Band I. Ulm.
