= Danube-Iller Regional S-Bahn =

The Danube-Iller Regional S-Bahn (Regio-S-Bahn Donau-Iller) is a "regional" S-Bahn system in the Ulm and Neu-Ulm area. It operates Regionalbahn services on electrified and non-electrified lines. Its core is Ulm Hauptbahnhof, which acts as a hub between the regional S-Bahn (RS) lines, other regional services and long-distance services. In December 2020, the first two RS lines from Ulm to Memmingen (RS 7) and Weißenhorn (RS 71) were put into operation in the Bavarian part of the Danube-Iller planning region (Region Donau-Iller). When the 2021/2022 timetable changed, three more lines followed in the Württemberg part of the region on the southern railway to Biberach (RS 2 and RS 21), on the Danube line to Munderkingen (RS 3) and on the Brenz Railway to Aalen (RS 5 and RS 51). Further lines are to be added in the following years. The network is expected to be completed by 2030.

The Danube-Iller Regional S-Bahn is administered by the Donau-Iller-Nahverkehrsverbund GmbH (DING, "Danube-Iller local transport association") and two neighbouring transport associations, the Heidenheimer Tarifverbund ("Heidenheim tariff association") and OstalbMobil ("Ostalb Mobile").

== Line network ==
The following lines are planned or had already been established in 2021:

Line	BEG/NVBW line	DING line	Start of operation	Rolling stock	Operator	Route	Lines used
RS 2	RB 51b	R2	12 December 2021	Class 425	DB Regio BW	Ulm Hbf – Erbach – Laupheim West – Biberach an der Riß – Ummendorf – Bad Schussenried – Aulendorf	Ulm–Friedrichshafen
RS 21	RB 51a	R2	12 December 2021	Class 425	DB Regio BW	Ulm Hbf – Erbach – Laupheim West – Laupheim Stadt – Biberach an der Riß – Ummendorf	Ulm–Friedrichshafen
RS 3	RB 56	R3	12 December 2021	LINT 54	SWEG	Ulm Hbf – Blaubeuren – Schelklingen – Ehingen (Donau) – Munderkingen	Ulm–Sigmaringen
RS 3	RB 56	R3	planned in the medium term			Munderkingen – Riedlingen (extension)	
RS4	MEX 16	R4	planned in the medium term			Ulm Hbf – Amstetten – Geislingen	Stuttgart–Ulm
RS 5	RE 57	R5	12 December 2021	LINT 54	SWEG	Ulm Hbf – Langenau – Niederstotzingen – Sontheim an der Brenz – Giengen – Herbrechtingen – Heidenheim an der Brenz – Oberkochen – Aalen Hbf	Aalen–Ulm
RS 51	RB 57	R5	12 December 2021	LINT 54	SWEG	Ulm Hbf – Langenau	Aalen–Ulm
RS 7	RS7	R7	13 December 2020	LINT 41, 54	DB Regio Bayern	Ulm Hbf – Neu-Ulm – Senden – Illertissen – Memmingen	Kempten (Allgäu)–Neu-Ulm
RS 7	RS7	R7	planned in the medium term			Memmingen – Buxheim (extension)	Leutkirch–Memmingen
RS 71	RS71	RS71	13 December 2020	LINT 41, 54	DB Regio Bayern	Ulm Hbf – Neu-Ulm – Senden – Weißenhorn	Ulm–Sigmaringen – Kempten (Allgäu)–Neu-Ulm – Senden–Weißenhorn
RS8	RB 15	R8	planned in the long term			Ulm Hbf – Neu-Ulm – Nersingen – Günzburg	Augsburg–Ulm
RS81	RB 15 / RB 78 / RE 71 / RE 72	R8	planned in the long term			(Ulm Hbf – Neu-Ulm – Nersingen –) Günzburg – Krumbach (Schwaben) – Mindelheim	Augsburg–Ulm – Günzburg–Mindelheim
RS81	RB 15 / RB 78 / RE 71 / RE 72	R8	optional			Mindelheim – Memmingen – Buxheim	Buchloe–Memmingen – Leutkirch–Memmingen
