= Buchloe–Memmingen railway =

Railway line in Germany

Overview
- Native name: Bahnstrecke Buchloe-Memmingen
- Owner: Deutsche Bahn
- Line number: 5360
- Locale: Bavaria
- Termini: Buchloe; Memmingen
- Stations: 7

Service
- Route number: 971
- Operator(s): DB Bahn

History
- Opened: 1 May 1874

Technical
- Line length: 46.1 km (28.6 mi)
- Number of tracks: Single track
- Track gauge: 1,435 mm (4 ft 8 1/2 in) standard gauge
- Electrification: 15 kV 16.7 Hz AC overhead catenary
- Operating speed: 140 km/h (87 mph)

The Buchloe–Memmingen railway is an approximately 45 kilometre long single-track, electrified mainline in the German state of Bavaria. It connects Buchloe and Memmingen and is part of the railway axis from Augsburg to Lindau.

== History ==
The line from Buchloe to Memmingen was opened on 1 May 1874 as a part of the Munich–Memmingen railway in the kingdom of Bavaria.

In November 2017, the Stetten and Sontheim stations and the Ungerhausen yard were connected to the Memmingen computer-based interlocking.

The stations at Türkheim, Stetten and Sontheim were rebuilt barrier-free with work finishing in autumn 2018. In the first half of 2018, the historic, almost 145-year-old masonry arch bridge over the Auerbach and state road 2013 near Stetten was demolished and replaced with a reinforced concrete bridge.

As part of the upgrade of the Munich–Lindau line, the section was electrified with work completed at the end of 2020. This shortened the travel time from Memmingen to Munich by around 30 minutes. Lindau can be reached from Munich in less than two hours and Zurich in three and a half hours. The formal groundbreaking ceremony took place in Memmingen on 23 March 2018—with the simultaneous start of construction work and a six-month line closure up to and including 14 November 2018.

== Route ==
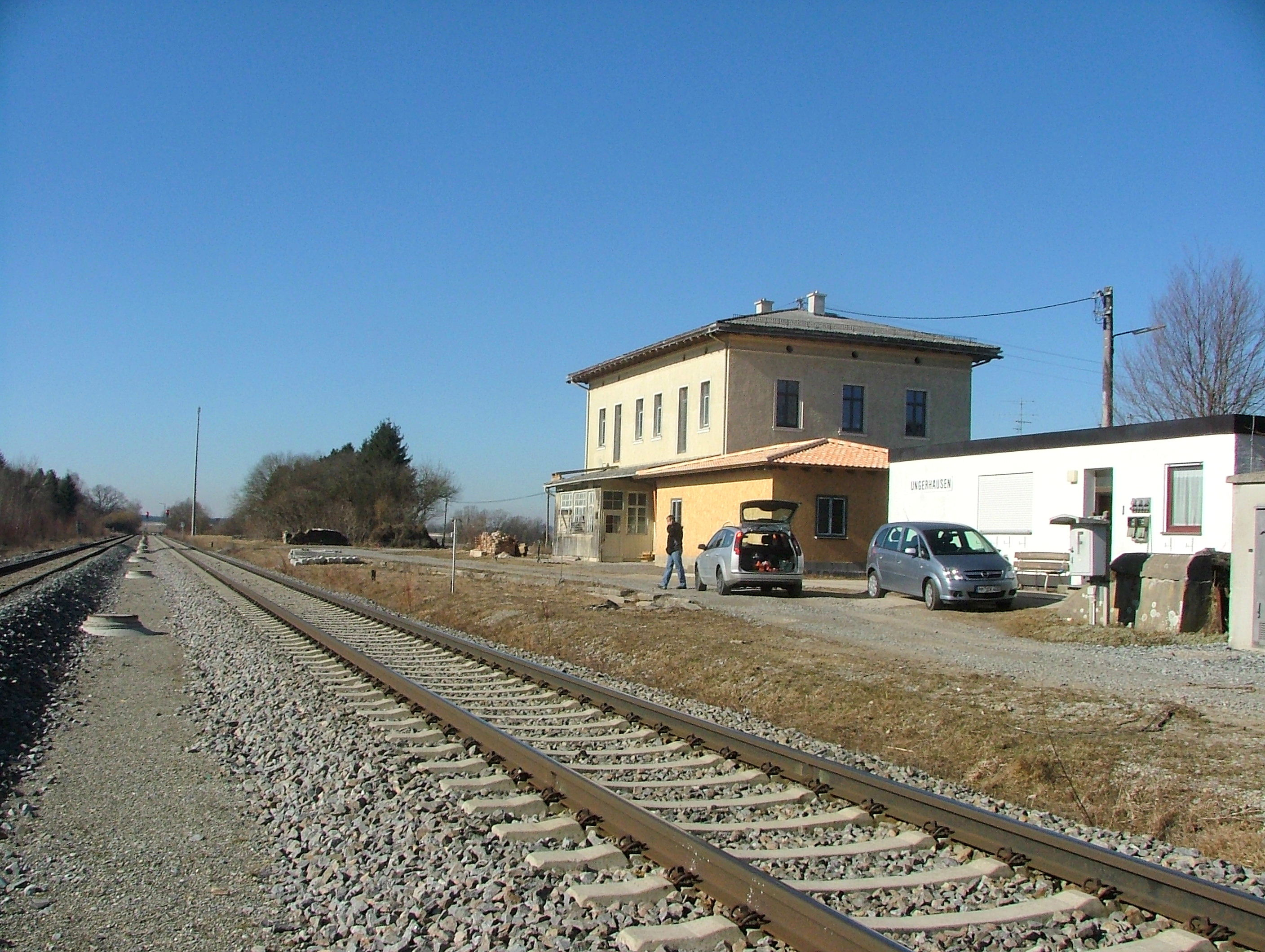
Ungerhausen station (closed)

The line branches off the Munich–Buchloe railway in Buchloe. The Türkheim–Bad Wörishofen railway branches off at Turkheim station. The Günzburg–Mindelheim railway (also called the Mittelschwabenbahn) branches off towards Krumbach and Günzburg in Mindelheim. There are some through services on the Günzburg–Mindelheim railway towards Memmingen and in the opposite direction. The Ungerhausen–Ottobeuren railway formerly branched off in Ungerhausen, but it has now been converted into a cycle path. In Memmingen, the line connects with the Neu-Ulm–Kempten railway and the Leutkirch–Memmingen railway, which connects to Lindau via the Württemberg Allgäu and the Kißlegg–Hergatz railways.

== Current operations ==
Services on the line are set out in table 971 of the German railway timetable:

Train class	Route	Frequency	Rolling stock
ECE 88	Munich – Buchloe – Memmingen – Lindau-Reutin – Bregenz – Zürich	6 train pairs daily	Alstom ETR 610 of the SBB
RE 71/RE 73	Augsburg – Buchloe – Türkheim – Memmingen (with part of the train running Türkheim – Bad Wörishofen)	Every 2 hours	Class 612
RE 72	Munich – Buchloe – Memmingen	Every 2 hours	Stadler FLIRT 3
RE 96	Munich – Buchloe – Memmingen – Kißlegg – Lindau-Insel – Lindau-Reutin	Every 2 hours	Stadler FLIRT 3

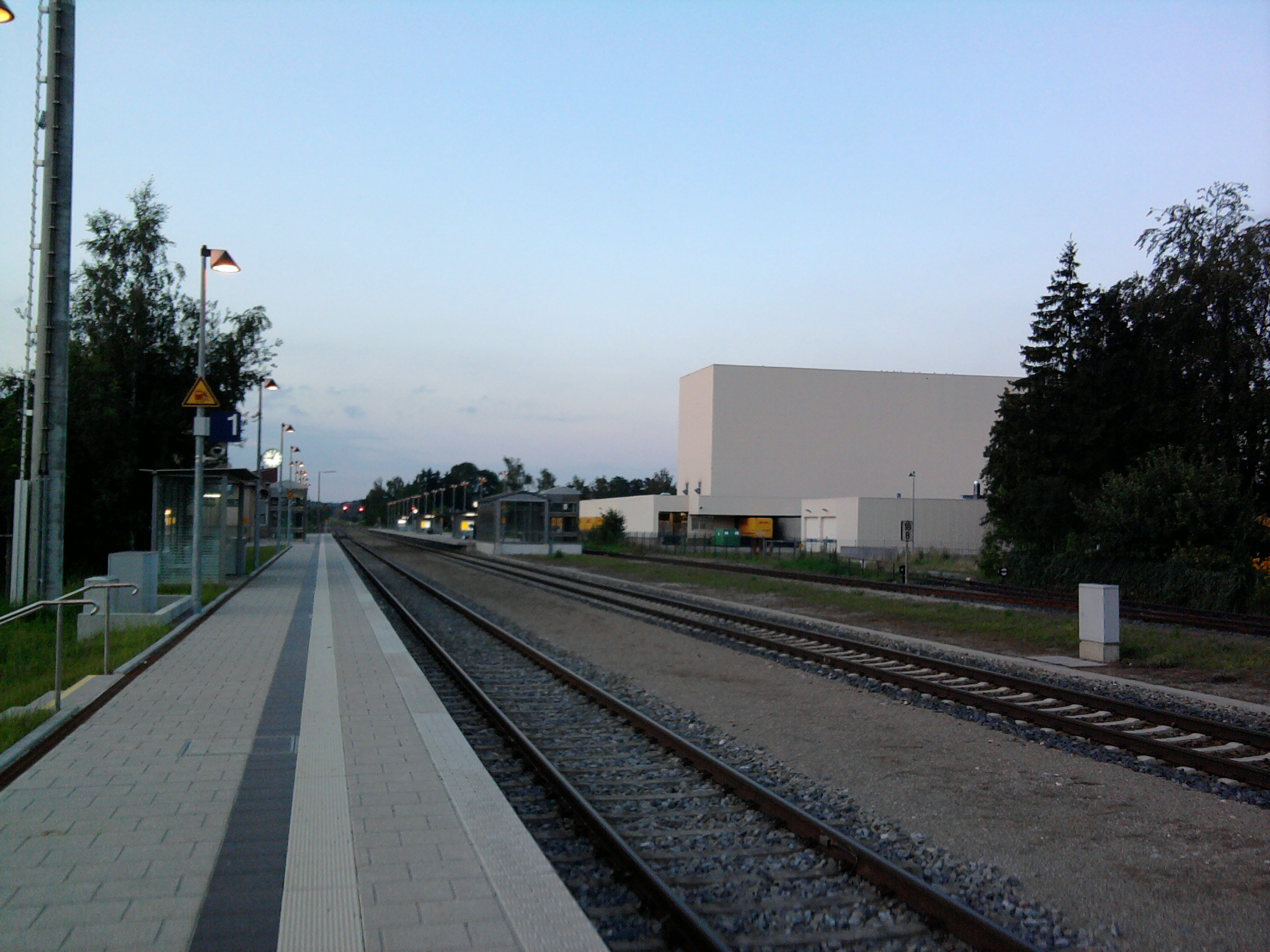
Mindelheim station

Trains to/from Augsburg or Munich operate on the Buchloe–Memmingen section hourly.

Since December 2011, coupled class 642 (Siemens Desiro Classic) railcars operate from Augsburg to Memmingen every two hours. In Türkheim, these are uncoupled and one railcar runs to Bad Wörishofen.

Since June 2015, the regional services to and from Munich have been running almost exclusively as double-deck sets hauled by Traxx (class 245) locomotives or occasionally class 218 locomotives. From 2017, these services were partially taken over by class 612 locomotives. Since the timetable change in December 2020, the line has been served by Alstom Coradia Continental sets (class 440) of the Donau-Isar-/Fugger-Express and double-deck trains hauled by class 111 locomotives in the transition year up to the start of operations by Go-Ahead. The released class 612 locomotives were to be reassigned for the successor operation of ALEX between Munich, Kempten and Lindau/Oberstdorf.

Since December 2020, the existing two-hour direct service of DB Regio between Munich and Memmingen has been operated electrically serving all regional stops from Geltendorf to Memmingen. In addition, since December 2021, fast electric regional services have run every two hours from around 8:00 a.m. on the Munich–Memmingen–Lindau Insel–Lindau-Reutin route. The stations in Munich-Pasing, Buchloe, Türkheim, Mindelheim and all stops from Memmingen to Lindau are served. The fast regional services are operated by Go-Ahead with electric Stadler FLIRT multiple units. The EuroCity-Express services between Munich and Zurich via Buchloe, Memmingen and Lindau have been operated by SBB using ETR 610 "Astoro" (New Pendolino) sets in cooperation with DB.

Most of the regional trains are scheduled to meet in Buchloe, Mindelheim and Memmingen. In addition, train crossings can take place at all existing crossing stations on the line in the event of additional services, delays or freight traffic. The Eurocitys always cross at Memmingen station on the hour.
