= Oberkochen station =

Railway station in the municipality of Oberkochen

Oberkochen
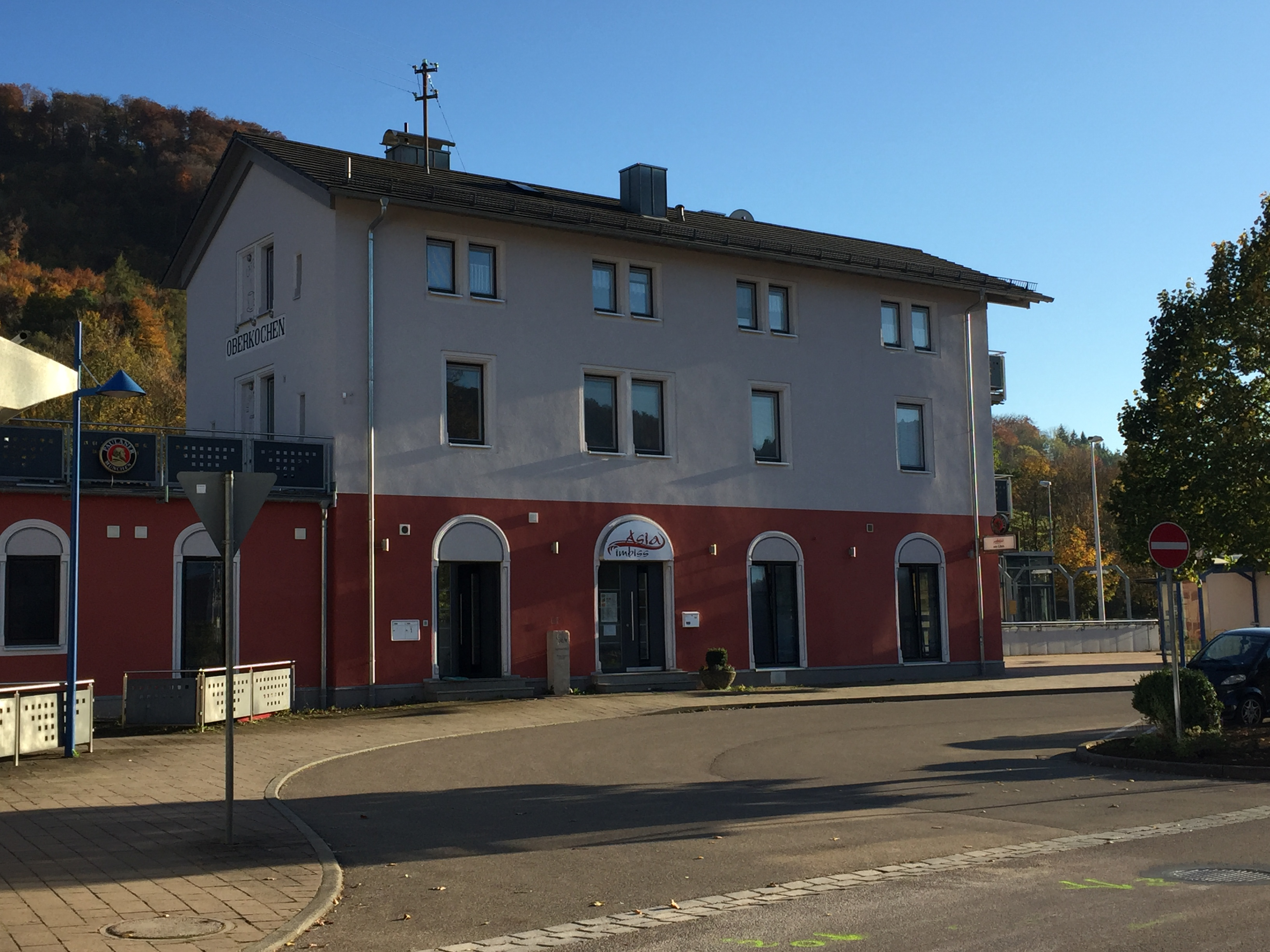

General information
- Location: Bahnhofstraße 1; 73447 Oberkochen; Baden-Württemberg; Germany
- Coordinates: 48°46′57″N 10°06′27″E
- Elevation: 494 m (1,621 ft)
- System: Bf
- Owner: DB Netz
- Operator: DB Station&Service
- Lines: Aalen–Ulm (KBS 757)
- Platforms: 1 island platform
- Tracks: 2
- Train operators: DB Regio Baden-Württemberg; SWEG Bahn Stuttgart
- Connections: Bus interchange

Construction
- Parking: yes
- Cycle facilities: yes
- Accessible: yes

Other information
- Station code: 4657
- DS100 code: TON
- IBNR: 8004549
- Category: 6
- Fare zone: OAM: 1163
- Website: www.bahnhof.de

Services
Preceding station	DB Regio Baden-Württemberg	Following station
Heidenheim towards Ulm Hbf	RE 50	Aalen Hbf Terminus
Preceding station	(Stuttgart)	Following station
Königsbronn towards Ulm Hbf	RS 5	Unterkochen towards Aalen Hbf
Location
- Location within Baden-Württemberg Location within Germany Location within Europe

Oberkochen station is a railway station in the municipality of Oberkochen, located in the Ostalbkreis district in Baden-Württemberg, Germany. The station lies on the Brenz Railway. The train services are operated by DB Regio Baden-Württemberg and SWEG Bahn Stuttgart.
