= Unterkochen station =

Railway station in the city of Aalen

Unterkochen

General information
- Location: Heidenheimer Straße 12; 73432 Aalen-Unterkochen; Baden-Württemberg; Germany
- Coordinates: 48°48′54″N 10°07′36″E
- Elevation: 459 m (1,506 ft)
- System: Bf
- Owner: DB Netz
- Operator: DB Station&Service
- Lines: Aalen–Ulm (KBS 757)
- Platforms: 1 side platform
- Tracks: 2
- Train operators: SWEG Bahn Stuttgart
- Connections: Bus interchange

Construction
- Parking: yes
- Cycle facilities: yes
- Accessible: yes

Other information
- Station code: 6354
- DS100 code: TUK
- IBNR: 8005997
- Category: 7
- Fare zone: OAM: 1062
- Website: www.bahnhof.de

Services
Preceding station	(Stuttgart)	Following station
Oberkochen towards Ulm Hbf	RS 5	Aalen Hbf Terminus
Location
- Location within Baden-Württemberg Location within Germany Location within Europe

Unterkochen station is a railway station in the city of Aalen, located in the Ostalbkreis district in Baden-Württemberg, Germany. The station lies on the Brenz Railway. The train services are operated by SWEG Bahn Stuttgart.
