= Neu-Ulm station =

Railway station in Germany

Neu-Ulm
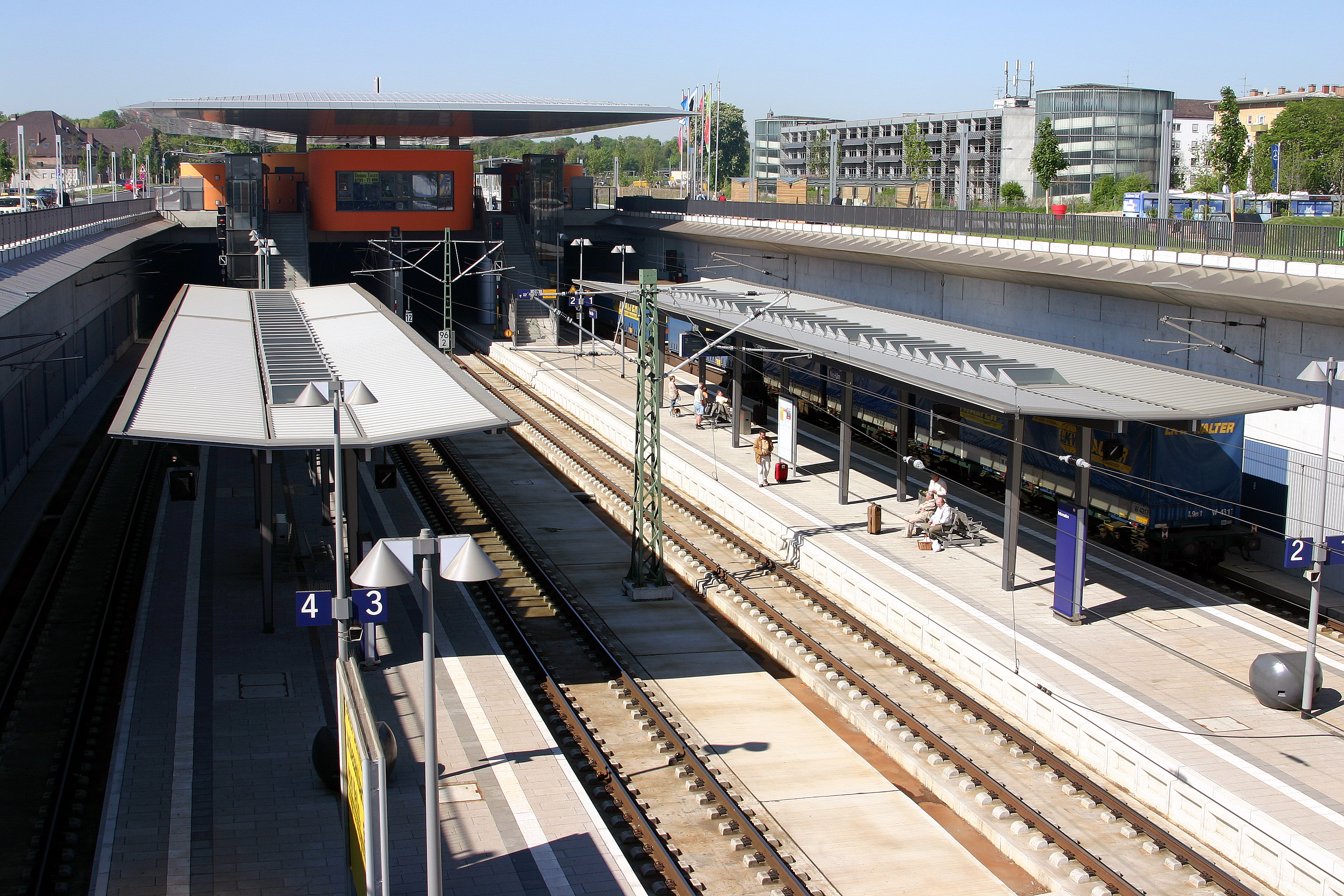
- Station after reconstruction

General information
- Location: Julius-Rohm-Platz 1, Neu-Ulm, Bavaria; Germany
- Coordinates: 48°23′36″N 10°00′19″E
- Owner: Deutsche Bahn
- Operator: DB Netz; DB Station&Service
- Lines: Ulm–Augsburg (KBS 980); Neu-Ulm–Kempten (KBS 975)
- Platforms: 2
- Tracks: 4

Construction
- Accessible: Yes

Other information
- Station code: 4357
- DS100 code: MNM
- IBNR: 8006730
- Category: 4
- Fare zone: DING: 10
- Website: stationsdatenbank.de; www.bahnhof.de

History
- Opened: 26 September 1853

Services
Preceding station	DB Fernverkehr	Following station
Ulm Hbf One-way operation	ICE 60	Günzburg towards München Hbf
Preceding station		Following station
Ulm Hbf Terminus	RE 9	Nersingen towards München Hbf
Preceding station	DB Regio Bayern	Following station
Ulm Hbf Terminus	RE 75	Gerlenhofen towards Oberstdorf
Ulm Hbf towards Günzburg	RB 78	Günzburg towards Krumbach (Schwab)
Ulm Hbf Terminus	RS 7	Finningerstraße towards Memmingen
Ulm Hbf Terminus	RS 71	Finningerstraße towards Weißenhorn
Preceding station		Following station
Ulm Hbf towards Ulm Hbf	RB 15	Nersingen towards Ingolstadt Hbf
Location
- Location within Bavaria Location within Germany Location within Europe

Neu-Ulm station is the largest railway station of the Bavarian Große Kreisstadt (major district town) of Neu-Ulm. Other station in Neu-Ulm are Gerlenhofen and Finninger Straße, both on the Neu-Ulm–Kempten railway, and the disused Burlafingen station on the Ulm–Augsburg railway.

The station was opened in 1853 and was rebuilt in 2007 as part of the Neu-Ulm 21 project in an open trough structure, which is covered to the northeast and southwest of the platforms.

It has four platform tracks and is served daily by about 120 trains operated by Deutsche Bahn and agilis. The station is served by local trains managed by the Donau-Iller-Nahverkehrsverbund (Danube-Iller Local Transport Association, DING).

== Location ==
Neu-Ulm station is located southeast of the city centre of Neu-Ulm. Bahnhofstrasse (station street) runs to the northwest of the station and Meininger Allee runs to the southeast. To the southwest is the station building and the bus station, where Hermann Koehl-Straße also crosses the tracks. In the northeast is the station’s parking lot; north of it Reuttier Straße crosses the tracks. Both the bus station and the parking lot are built on the roof of the cut and cover tunnels that the rail tracks run through. The station’s address is Julius-Rohm-Platz 1.

== History ==
On 25 April 1850, the Kingdom of Bavaria signed a treaty with the Kingdom of Württemberg to extend the railway line between Munich and Augsburg to Ulm and connect with the Württemberg railway network. In March 1852, construction began on the railway bridge over the Danube. The first train arrived at Neu-Ulm station after 25 December 1853; this was officially opened on 26 September together with the Neu-Ulm–Burgau section of the Bavarian Maximilian’s Railway. Since the Danube bridge had not yet been completed, a droshky service operated between Ulm and Neu-Ulm station. The Neu-Ulm station building was completed on 1 December 1853. The Danube bridge, which from the beginning was designed for two tracks, was completed on 1 May 1854 and the entire Maximilian’s Railway from Ulm to Munich was completed on 1 June. It was operated by four daily trains each way. The line between Ulm and Neu-Ulm was duplicated at the end of 1856.

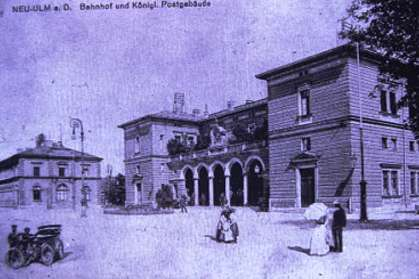
The station building of 1874 in 1910

On 12 October 1862, the Iller Valley Railway was opened from Neu-Ulm to Memmingen with four trains running daily and it was extended to Kempten on 1 June 1863. Some changes were made up to 1869 and the station was equipped with gas lighting in 1872. On 15 February 1871, the Bavarian State Railways took the Neu-Ulm depot (Bahnbetriebswerk Neu-Ulm) in operation. By September 1874, in the wake of the expansion of the station complex, a new station building was built in Renaissance Revival style, which was designed by the Bavarian architect Friedrich Bürklein. In March 1892, the duplication of the Maximilian’s Railway between Augsburg and Neu-Ulm was completed, so that the whole line between Munich and Stuttgart via Ulm was duplicated.

From 1877 to 1944, a line of the Ulm tramway stopped at Neu-Ulm station. From 1931 to 1933, the Maximilian’s Railway from Ulm to Augsburg was electrified by Deutsche Reichsbahn and it was opened for electrical operations on 25 April 1933. The entire route from Stuttgart to Munich was open for electrical operations on 5 May 1933.

In the Second World War the first air raid took place on Neu-Ulm station on 16 March 1944. The freight handling facilities, signal box no. II and several other buildings in Neu-Ulm were destroyed in an air raid on 1 March 1945. The station building and the depot were also destroyed on 4 March. During the invasion of U.S. troops the railway bridge over the Danube between Ulm and Neu-Ulm was blown up on 24 April 1945. In May 1945, a temporary wooden bridge was built across the Danube, replacing the demolished railway bridge. Electric trains were resumed from Ulm to Neu-Ulm on 29 June. After the war, the station building was reconstructed as a temporary stone shed. On 23 November 1957, a new station was opened, replacing the stone shed. The Kibri Company produced a toy kit of this station at HO scale. The reconstruction of the platform canopies were completed in 1960. The ticket office closed in 2000.

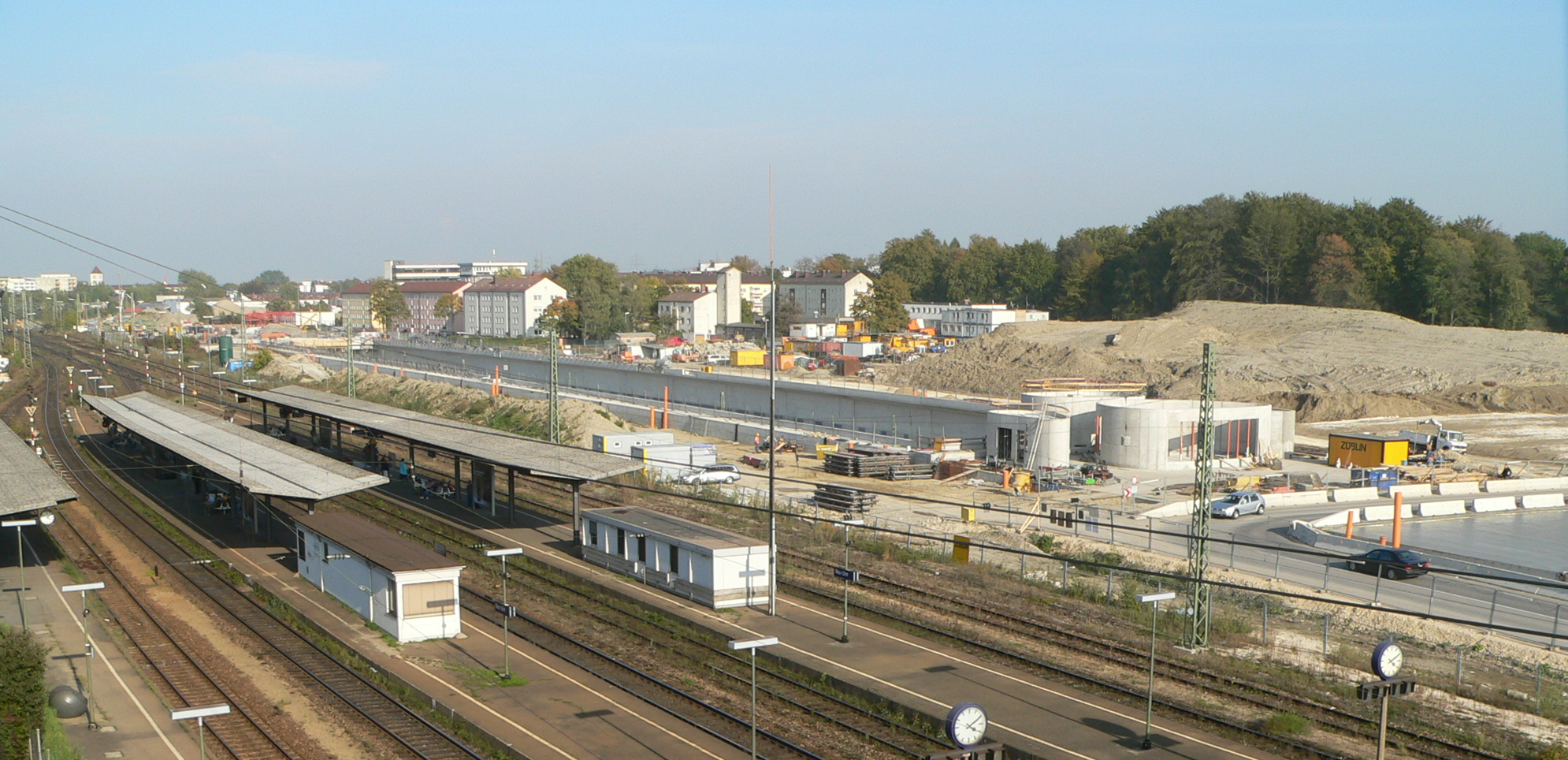
Construction of the new station on the right and the old station on the left in 2006

During the Neu-Ulm 21 project, the station tracks were rebuilt from scratch by 2007. The five platform track surface station together with the adjacent railway lines were lowered and the number of tracks was reduced to four. The sub-surface station was opened on 18 March 2007.

At the end of March 2007, the second track at Neu-Ulm Finninger Straße was put into service, largely removing delays caused by trains waiting to run to or from Memmingen. The old station building was demolished in April 2007. The project was completed in November 2007 and the new track layout was put into operation in December.

== Layout ==
=== Platforms ===
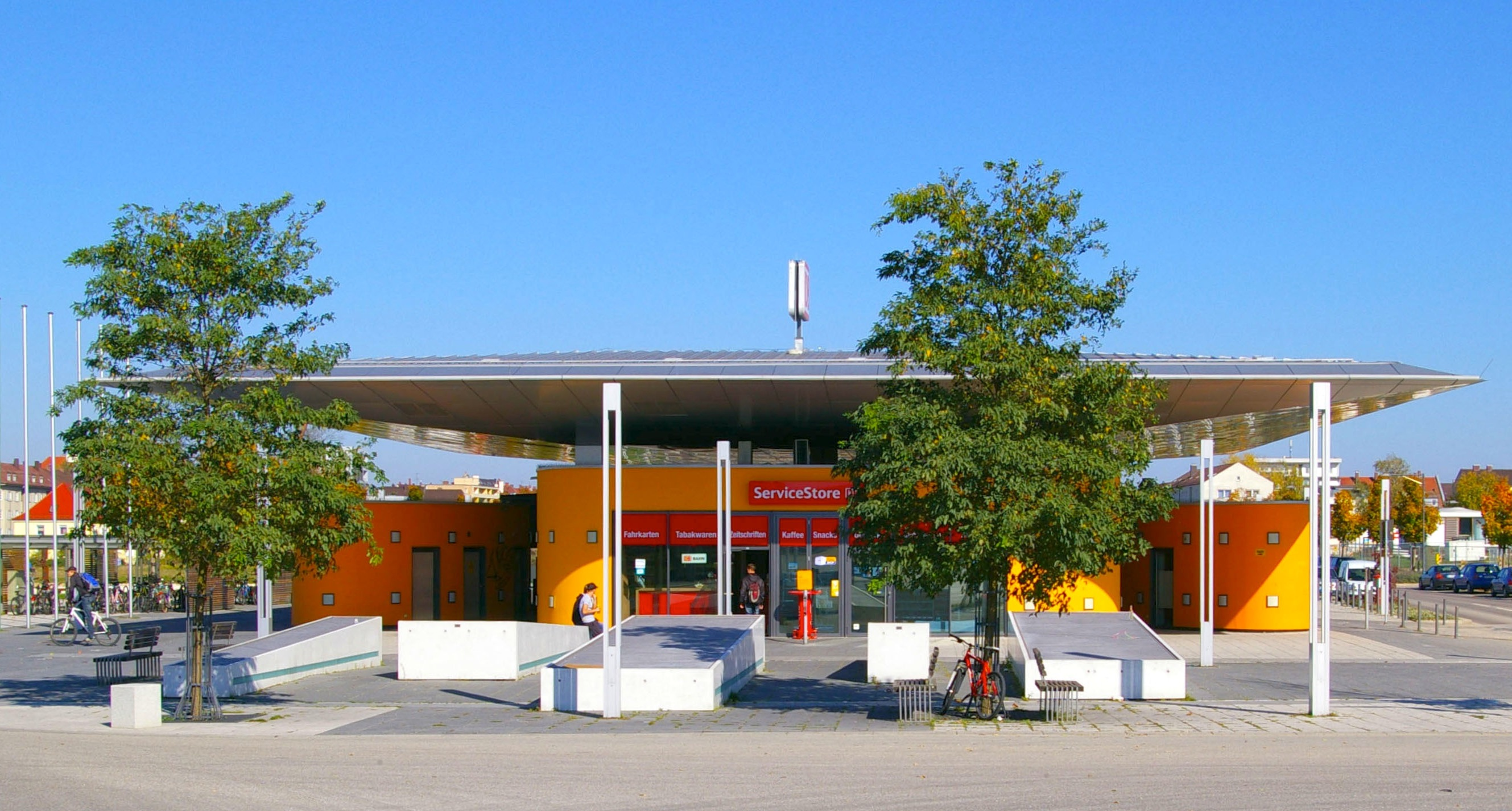
The station building of 2007

Neu-Ulm station has four tracks next to two central platforms. Both platforms are covered and have digital destination displays. The platforms are connected to the surface by stairs and lifts and are thus accessible for the disabled. Tracks 1 and 2 are used by services on the Augsburg–Ulm railway, tracks 3 and 4 are used by trains on the Neu-Ulm–Kempten railway. Slab track is used in the tunnels.

Platforms	Length in m	Height in cm	Use
1	245	55	Services on Augsburg–Ulm line towards Ulm
2	245	55	Services on Augsburg–Ulm line towards Augsburg and Donauwörth
3	240	55	Services on Neu-Ulm–Kempten railway towards Ulm
4	240	55	Services on Neu-Ulm–Kempten railway towards Memmingen

=== Depot ===
On 15 February 1871, Neu-Ulm’s own depot (Bahnbetriebswerk Neu-Ulm) was opened with two roundhouses, a waterworks and a workshop. The servicing of locomotives of the Bavarian Maximilian and Neu-Ulm–Kempten railways, which was previously carried at a depot at Ulm station, was then transferred to Neu-Ulm. The repair of carriages was carried out in a long rectangular hall. On 27 June 1902, a new 18 metre and 120-ton turntable was commissioned to allow larger steam engines to run. During World War II, the depot was severely damaged along with 16 steam locomotives on 4 March 1945, but after rebuilding it resumed its previous tasks. On 1 January 1961, the steam locomotives were transferred to Ulm depot and electric locomotives were transferred to Augsburg depot, after which the workshop was closed. On 1 September 1965, the depot was eventually closed and the installations were dismantled. A carriage hall and the administrative and social buildings were preserved and were demolished in 2000 for Neu-Ulm 21.

=== Interlockings ===
Before the Second World War, there were two mechanical signal boxes in Neu-Ulm of the Bruchsal class, which were called signal boxes II and III. Signal box II was destroyed in World War II in an air raid on 1 March 1945. After the war it was rebuilt and resumed operations in mid-1946. On 31 January 1965, the mechanical interlocking in signal box II was replaced by a track plan push button interlocking of Siemens class 59 (SP Dr S59), allowing 15 staff positions to be saved. In 2004, signal box III was decommissioned. As part of Neu-Ulm 21, the push button interlocking was decommissioned on 17 March 2007 and demolished shortly thereafter. As a substitute on 18 March 2007, an electronic interlocking in Ulm, built as Lorenz class L90, remotely controls the Neu-Ulm area.

== Rail operations ==
The station is served by the Augsburg–Ulm and the Neu-Ulm–Kempten railways.

Neu-Ulm station is served by the Regional-Express service between Ulm and Munich (Fugger-Express) hourly with electric multiple units of class 440. Individual regional express services on the Ulm–Kempten services, operated with diesel locomotives of class 218 and Silberling carriages also stop. The other trains from Ulm to Kempten and Oberstdorf pass through Neu-Ulm station hourly without stopping. Regionalbahn services on the Ulm–Memmingen–Aulendorf and the Ulm-Memmingen routes also stop every two hours. These lines are operated with diesel multiple units of class 650. Since 11 December 2011, the station has also been served by agilis trains, using EMUs to class Coradia Continental. These run on the Ulm–Regensburg (–Eggmühl) and the Ulm–Ingolstadt lines, both every two hours. A pair of Intercity services (Stuttgart–) Ulm–Munich also stops in Neu-Ulm.

Line/ Train type	Route	Frequency	Operator
ICE 60	Stuttgart → Ulm → Neu-Ulm → Augsburg → Munich	One train	DB Fernverkehr
RE 9	Fugger-Express: Munich – Augsburg – Günzburg – Neu-Ulm – Ulm	Hourly	DB Regio Bayern
RB 15	Ulm – Neu-Ulm – Günzburg – Donauwörth – Ingolstadt (– Regensburg)	Hourly Mon–Fri, every 2 hours Sat and Sun	agilis
RE 18	Ulm – Neu-Ulm – Günzburg – Donauwörth – Ingolstadt – Regensburg (– Plattling)	Every 2 hours Sat and Sun	agilis
RE 75	Ulm – Neu-Ulm – Memmingen – Kempten (Allgäu) – Oberstdorf	Some trains in the peak	DB Regio Bayern
RB 78	Mittelschwabenbahn: Ulm – Neu-Ulm – Günzburg – Ichenhausen – Krumbach	1 train Mon-Fri	DB Regio Bayern
RS 7	Ulm – Neu-Ulm – Senden – Altenstadt – Memmingen	Every hour	DB Regio Bayern
RS 71	Ulm – Neu-Ulm – Senden – Weißenhorn	Every hour	DB Regio Bayern

== Bus station ==
The central bus station (Neu-Ulm Zentrale Umsteigepunkt) is the main bus station in Neu-Ulm and has four platforms. It is served by bus routes 5 and 7 of Stadtwerke Ulm/Neu-Ulm (a company providing municipal services in Ulm and Neu-Ulm) and regional buses.

On 15 May 1897, the Ulm tramway opened line 2 to the Neu-Ulm station forecourt, linking the stations of Ulm and Neu-Ulm. In the Second World War, the route of tram line 2 was damaged in an air raid on 17 December 1944 and operations were stopped. As a replacement, the Ulm trolleybus was established with line 6 operating from 14 May 1947 from Eselsberg via Ulm Central Station and Neu-Ulm station to Ulm Zundeltor. On 23 October 1963 the trolleybus operations were discontinued and replaced by diesel buses.

As part of the Neu-Ulm 21 project, the central bus station was opened in 2007 and the old bus station on the station forecourt was closed.

Line	Route
5	Wissenschaftsstadt – Heilmeyersteige – Kienlesberg – Ulm Hauptbahnhof – Rathaus Ulm – Neu-Ulm ZUP – Ludwigsfeld / Wiley
7	Jungingen – Michelsberg – Ulm Hauptbahnhof – Ehinger Tor – Neu-Ulm ZUP – Willy-Brandt-Platz
