= Giengen (Brenz) station =

Railway station in Germany

Giengen (Brenz)
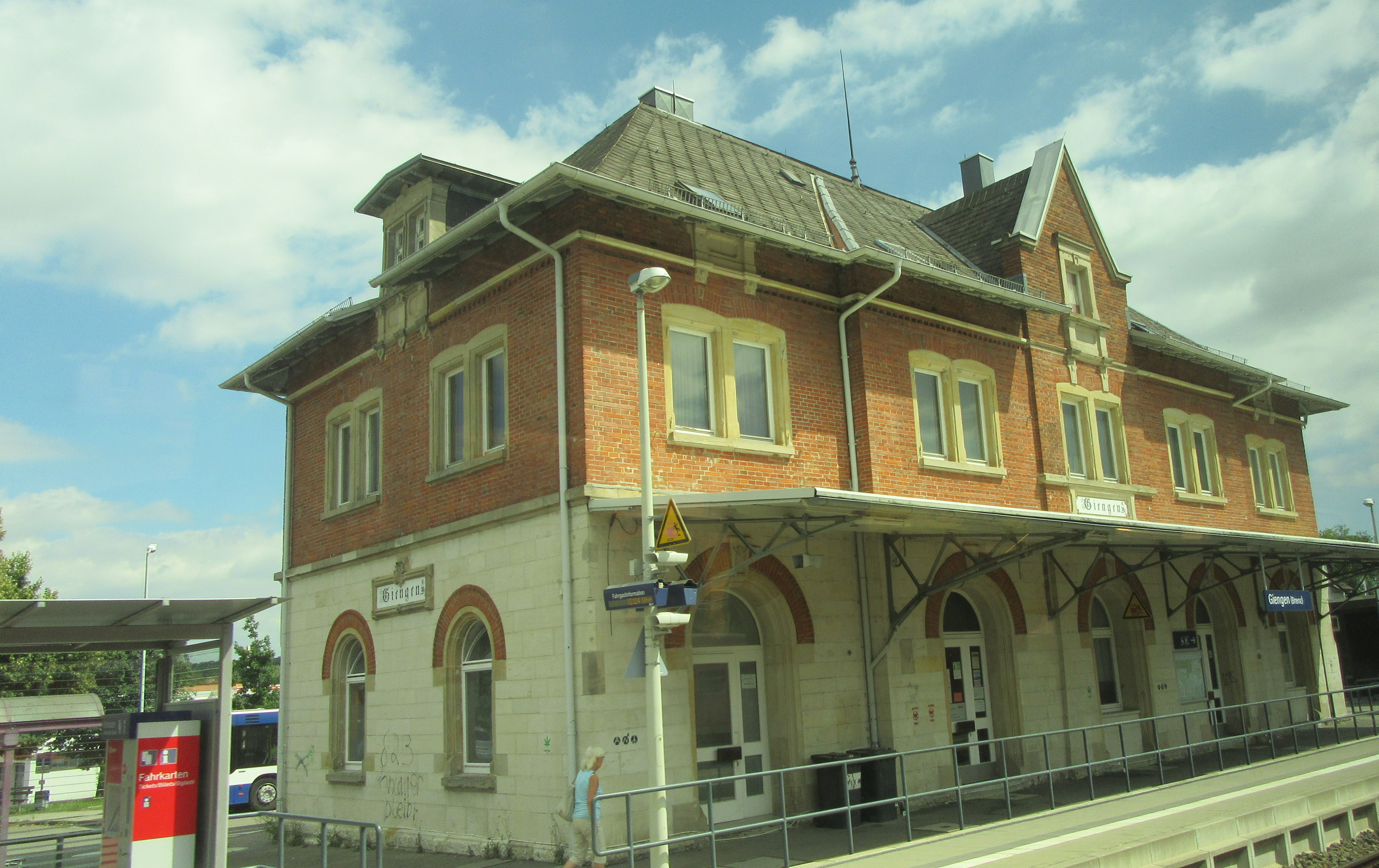
- 2016

General information
- Location: Bahnhofstraße 29; 89537 Giengen an der Brenz; Baden-Württemberg; Germany
- Coordinates: 48.6201°N 10.2371°E
- Elevation: 464 m (1,522 ft)
- Owner: DB Netz
- Operator: DB Station&Service
- Lines: Brenz Railway (KBS 757)
- Platforms: 2 side platforms
- Tracks: 3
- Train operators: DB Regio Baden-Württemberg; Hohenzollerische Landesbahn

Other information
- Station code: 2118
- DS100 code: TGB
- IBNR: 8002272
- Category: 5
- Fare zone: HTV: 19; DING: 21 (HTV transitional tariff)
- Website: www.bahnhof.de

Services
Preceding station	DB Regio Baden-Württemberg	Following station
Langenau (Württ) towards Ulm Hbf	RE 50	Heidenheim towards Aalen Hbf
Preceding station	(Offenburg)	Following station
Hermaringen towards Ulm Hbf	RS 5	Herbrechtingen towards Aalen Hbf
Location

Giengen (Brenz) station is a railway station in the municipality of Giengen an der Brenz, located in the Heidenheim district in Baden-Württemberg, Germany.
