= Heidenheim station =

Railway station in Germany

Heidenheim
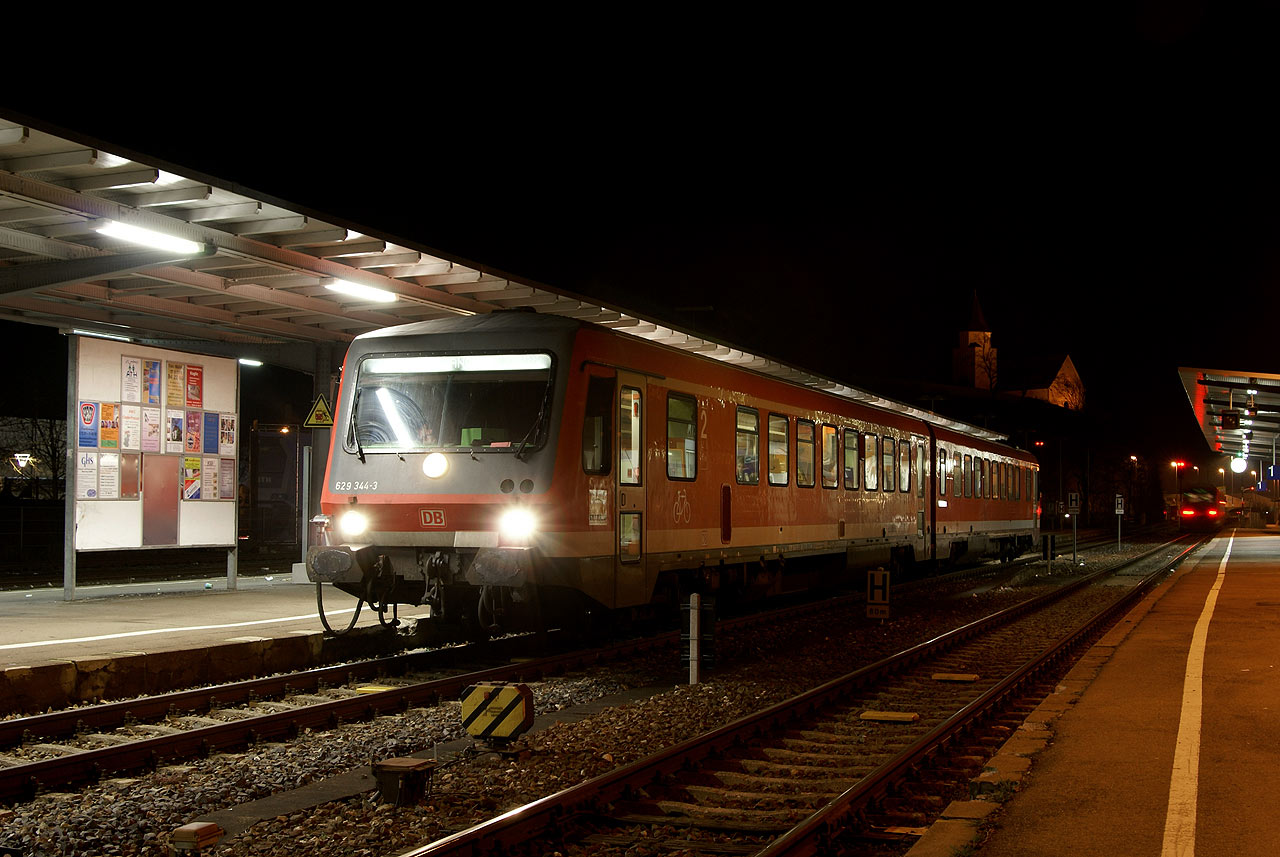
- 2006

General information
- Location: Bahnhofplatz 1; 89518 Heidenheim an der Brenz; Baden-Württemberg; Germany
- Coordinates: 48.6804°N 10.1562°E
- Owner: Deutsche Bahn
- Operator: DB Netz; DB Station&Service
- Lines: Brenz Railway (KBS 757)
- Platforms: 1 island platform 1 side platform
- Tracks: 4
- Train operators: DB Regio Baden-Württemberg; Hohenzollerische Landesbahn

Other information
- Station code: 2639
- DS100 code: THD
- IBNR: 8002689
- Category: 4
- Fare zone: HTV: 11; DING: 21 (HTV transitional tariff)
- Website: www.bahnhof.de

Services
Preceding station	DB Regio Baden-Württemberg	Following station
Giengen (Brenz) towards Ulm Hbf	RE 50	Oberkochen towards Aalen Hbf
Preceding station	(Offenburg)	Following station
Herbrechtingen towards Ulm Hbf	RS 5	Heidenheim-Schnaitheim towards Aalen Hbf
Location

Heidenheim station is a railway station in the municipality of Heidenheim an der Brenz, located in the Heidenheim district in Baden-Württemberg, Germany.
