= Mindelheim station =

Railway station in Mindelheim, Germany

Mindelheim
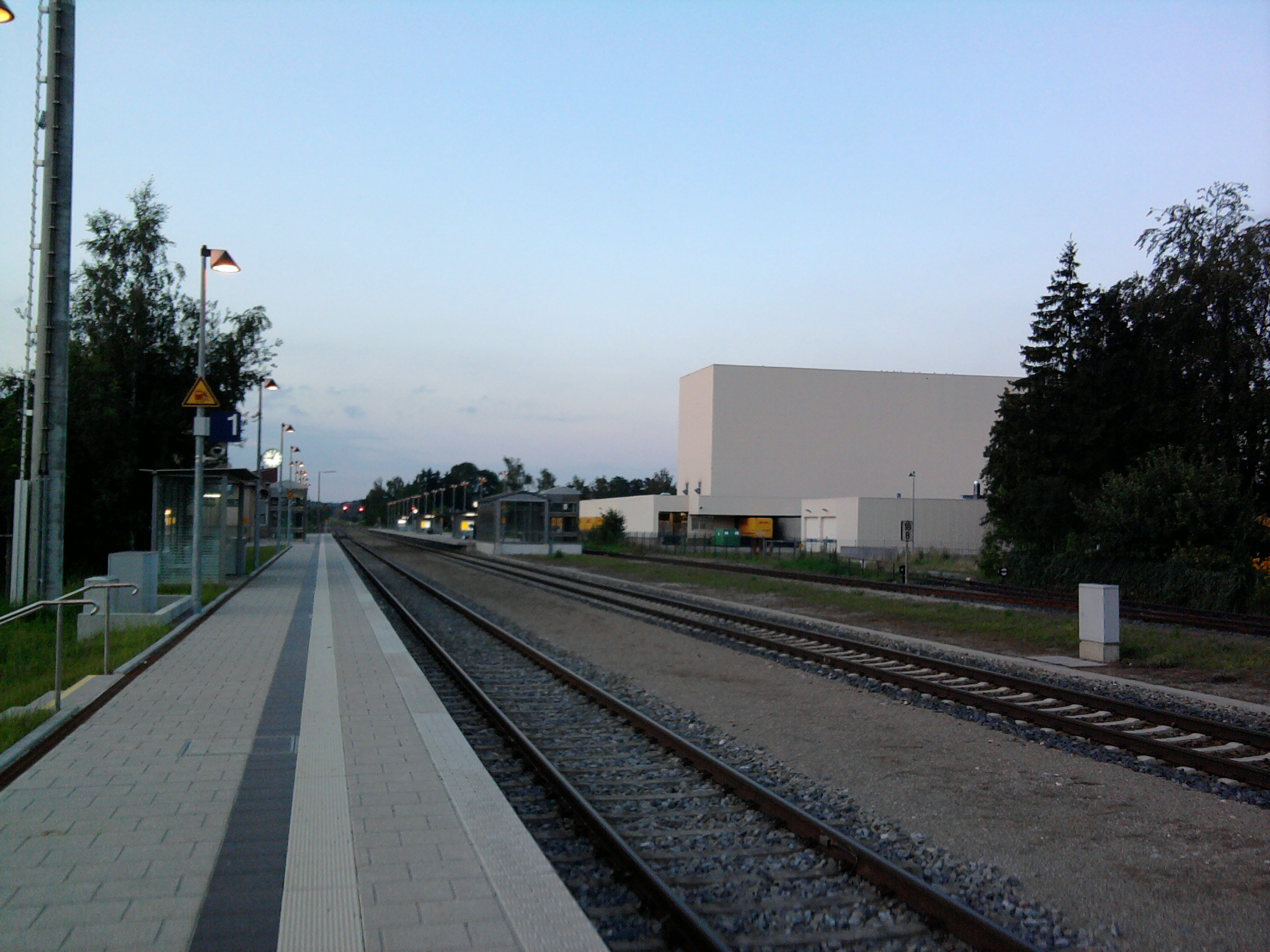

General information
- Location: Mindelheim, Bavaria; Germany
- Coordinates: 48°02′42″N 10°30′06″E
- Lines: Buchloe–Memmingen (KBS 971); Günzburg–Mindelheim (KBS 978)
- Platforms: 3

Construction
- Accessible: Yes

Other information
- Station code: 4119
- DS100 code: MMH
- IBNR: 8000338
- Category: 4
- Fare zone: 700 (VVM)
- Website: www.bahnhof.de; stationsdatenbank.de

Services
Preceding station	DB Regio Bayern	Following station
Stetten (Schwab) towards Memmingen	RE 71	Türkheim (Bay) towards Augsburg Hbf
Nassenbeuren towards Günzburg	RB 78	Terminus
Preceding station		Following station
Stetten (Schwab) towards Memmingen	RE 72	Rammingen (Bay) towards München Hbf
Stetten (Schwab) towards Lindau-Reutin	RE 96	Rammingen (Bay) towards München Hbf
Location
- Location within Bavaria Location within Germany Location within Europe

Mindelheim station is the station of the district town of Mindelheim in the German state of Bavaria and lies about one km south of the original town.

== History ==
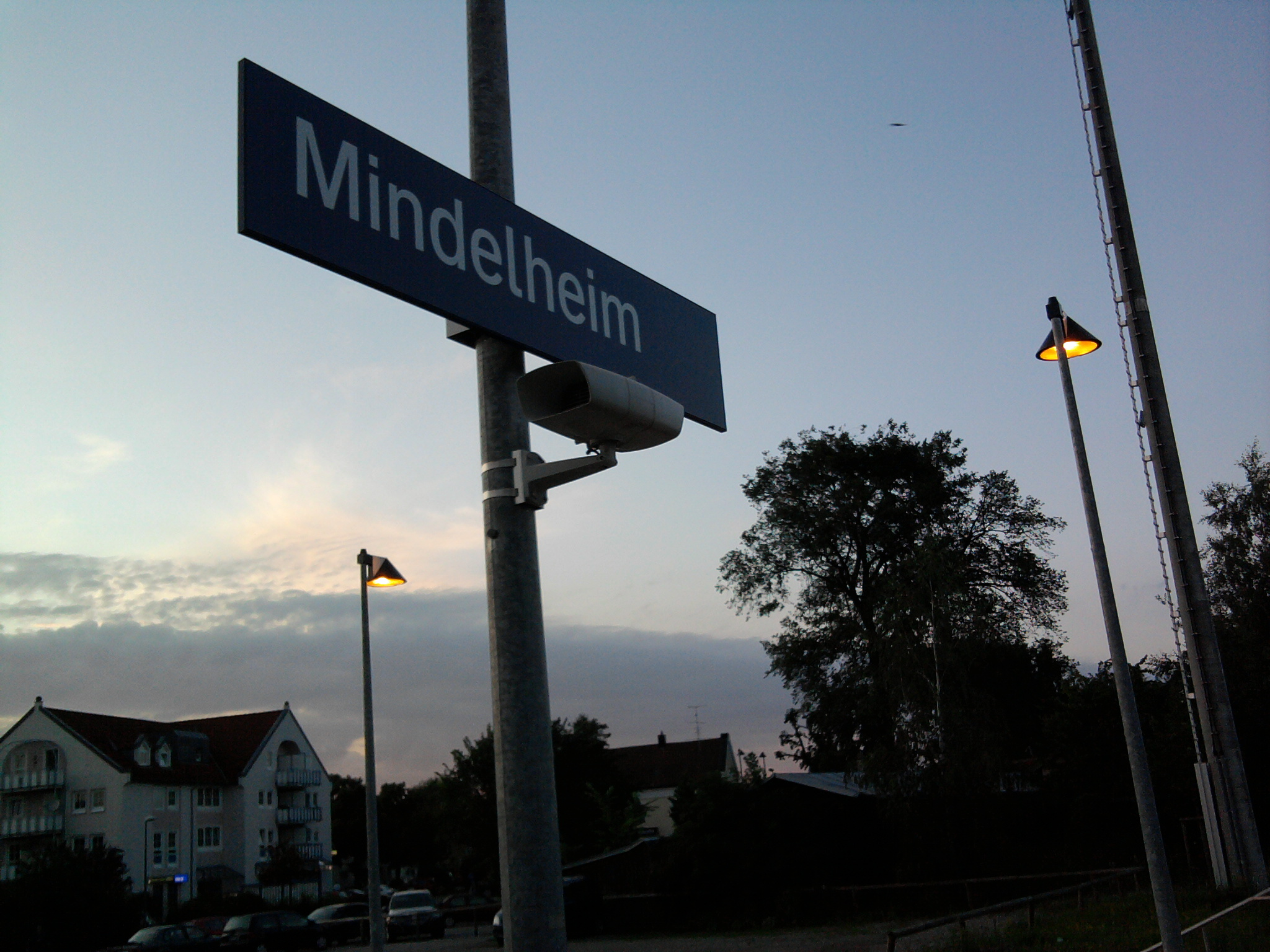
New sign on platform 1

In 2007/08, the station was renovated at a cost of €8 million. The four former tracks were reduced to three due to lack of space. A pedestrian underpass was built from Bahnhofstraße to Allgäuer Straße and an underpass for cars was built one km to the southwest; the level crossing on the old route of federal highway 16 was removed.

The Buchloe–Memmingen railway has been electrified since December 2020.

== Description ==
The station is located on the Buchloe–Memmingen railway and is the terminus of the Günzburg–Mindelheim railway, which runs via Krumbach to Günzburg.

The station has three platform tracks. Platform 1 is next to the station building and platforms 2 and 4 can be reached via an underpass. Platform 1 is used by trains to Gunzburg and Memmingen, while platform 2 is kept free for non-stopping services. When this is not necessary, services to Memmingen and Lindau stop on platform 2. Trains to Munich or Augsburg stop on platform 4.

There are two ticket machines. A ticket office operates during peak periods only.

=== Station building ===
On the lower floor of the station building there is a restaurant, the office of the station master, a counter, two kiosks and a bus shelter. The upper floor contains apartments. The building is in poor condition and its outer walls have crumbling plaster and exposed brick.

== Operations ==
Six pairs daily of EuroCity-Express services on line 88 are operated by Swiss Federal Railways through Mindelheim between Munich and Zurich, but do not stop.

Train class	Route	Frequency	Platform	Operator
RE 71	Augsburg – Bobingen – Buchloe – Türkheim – Mindelheim – Memmingen	Every 2 hours	2/4	DB Regio Bayern
RE 72	Munich – Geltendorf – Kaufering – Buchloe – Türkheim – Mindelheim – Memmingen	Every 2 hours	2/4	Arverio Bayern
RE 96	Munich – Buchloe – Mindelheim – Memmingen – Kißlegg – Lindau-Insel – Lindau-Reutin	Every 2 hours	2/4	Arverio Bayern
RB 78	Günzburg – Krumbach – Mindelheim	Every 2 hours	1	DB Regio Bayern

== Future ==
It is planned to build a central bus station on the station forecourt and to relocate the nearby car park to the west.

It is planned to integrate the Mindelheim–Memmingen route into the Ulm–Neu-Ulm–Günzburg–Mindelheim–Memmingen line of the Danube-Iller Regional S-Bahn (Regio-S-Bahn Ulm/Neu-Ulm). between 2020 and 2025.
