= Memmingen station =

Railway station in Memmingen, Germany

Memmingen
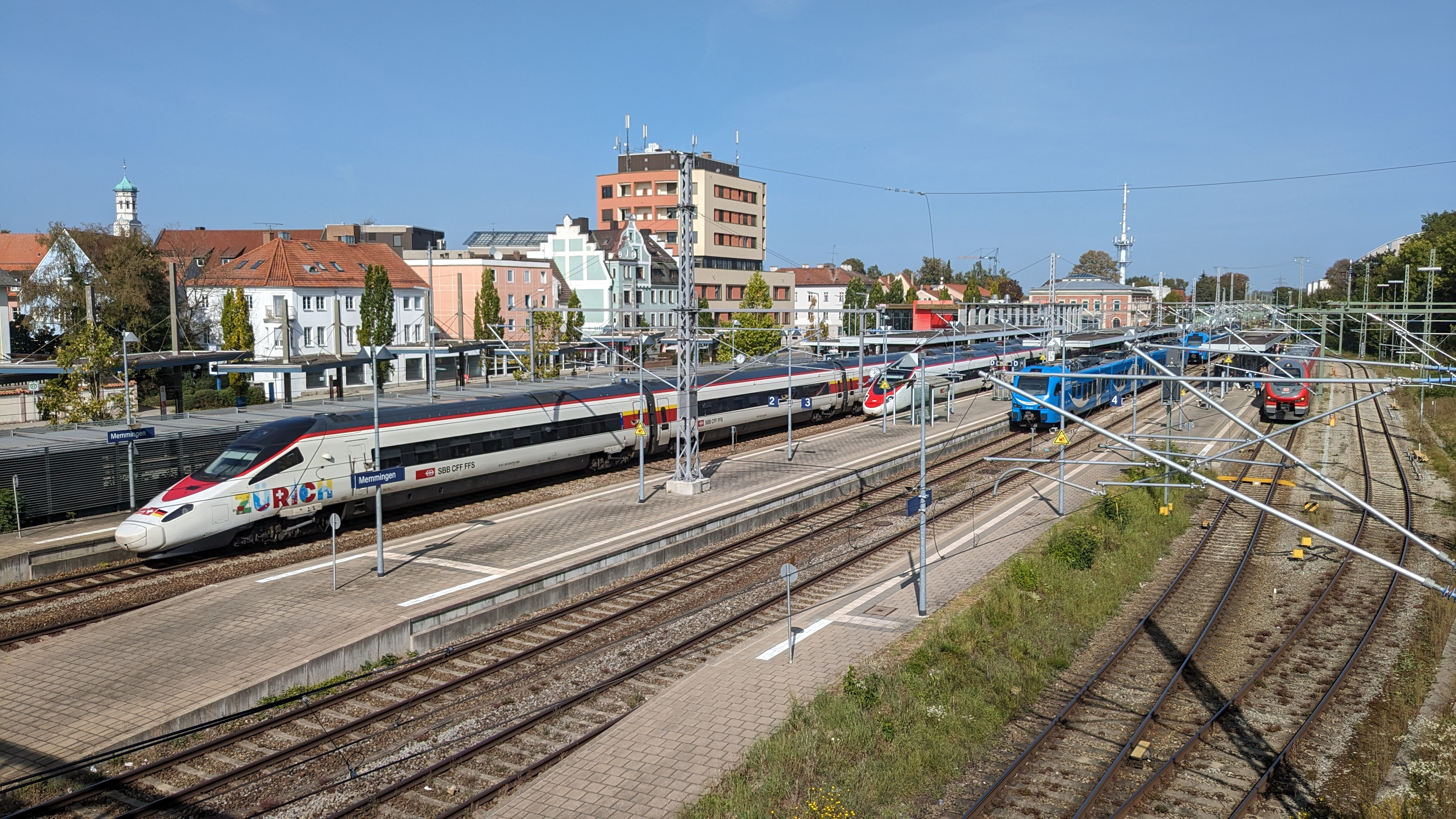
- 2023

General information
- Location: Bahnhofstr. 3. Memmingen, Bavaria; Germany
- Coordinates: 47°59′9″N 10°11′12″E
- Owner: Deutsche Bahn
- Operator: DB Station&Service
- Lines: Neu-Ulm–Kempten (km 34.9) (KBS 975); Buchloe–Memmingen (km 46.1) (KBS 971); Leutkirch–Memmingen (km 31.5) (KBS 971); Memmingen–Legau (km 0.0) (closed)
- Platforms: 5 long-distance platforms

Construction
- Accessible: Yes

Other information
- Station code: 4051
- DS100 code: MM
- IBNR: 8000249
- Category: 3
- Website: stationsdatenbank.de; www.bahnhof.de

History
- Opened: 12 October 1862

Services
Preceding station	DB Fernverkehr	Following station
Ulm Hbf towards Dortmund Hbf	ICE 55 Allgäu	Kempten Hbf towards Oberstdorf
Lindau-Reutin towards Zürich HB	ECE 88	Buchloe towards München Hbf
Preceding station	DB Regio Bayern	Following station
Terminus	RE 71	Sontheim towards Augsburg Hbf
Illertissen towards Ulm Hbf	RE 75	Bad Grönenbach towards Oberstdorf
Kellmünz towards Ulm Hbf	RS 7	Terminus
Preceding station		Following station
Tannheim (Württ) One-way operation	RE 72	Sontheim towards München Hbf
Tannheim (Württ) towards Lindau-Reutin	RE 96	Sontheim towards München Hbf
Tannheim (Württ) towards Lindau-Reutin	RB 92	Terminus
Tannheim (Württ) towards Lindau-Reutin	RE 92	Terminus
Location
- Location within Bavaria Location within Germany Location within Europe

Memmingen station in the city of Memmingen in the German state of Bavaria. The current station building had two predecessors, with the original being opened in 1862. The Buchloe–Memmingen and the Leutkirch–Memmingen railways meet the Neu-Ulm–Kempten railway (Iller Valley Railway) in Memmingen. The route from Munich to Zurich through Memmingen station is planned to be upgraded for tilting trains and electrified.

The station is designed to be accessible. For some time various parties have sought another railway stop at Schulzentrum West (school centre west) for about 3,500 students.

== Location ==
The station is located in the city centre on the eastern edge of the old town, between Kalchstraße and Lindentorstraße. Maximilianstraße starts outside the station from Bahnhofstraße (station street) which runs west of the station. To the north there is a pedestrian underpass to Augsburger Strasse and to the south Gaswerkstraße crosses the railway tracks over an iron bridge.

== History ==
Supported by financing by the city, the Iller Valley Railway connected Memmingen to the railway network in 1862. The first section from Memmingen to Neu-Ulm opened on 12 October 1862 and the southern portion from Memmingen to Kempten was put into operation on 1 June 1863. It was originally a joint post office and railway station.

It became a railway junction on 1 May 1874 with the opening of the Buchloe–Memmingen line. This connected Memmingen with the Bavarian capital of Munich. In 1879, the Memmingen station precinct had five tracks and three platforms. All the operations of the precinct at that time were handled on the site of today's station. The Kalchtor (a tower), the Lindentörlein (a gate in the wall), the Wasserturm (another tower) and a large part of the city walls were demolished for the rail infrastructure. A watering point and an accommodation building were located on the east side opposite the station building. Between them was a two-track roundhouse with a 12-metre turntable. A two track carriage shed with a loading ramp, a warehouse and turntable for wagons was built on the west side.

In 1887, the Kingdom of Bavaria and the Kingdom of Württemberg signed a treaty for the completion of the Württemberg Allgäu Railway and the construction of the Leutkirch–Memmingen line. Memmingen station was rebuilt in 1888. West of the original track three terminal tracks were built, two next to a platform. Next to the station there were sidings for passenger carriages and freight wagons and a shed for locomotives of the Royal Württemberg State Railways. There was also an engine shed with two tracks. An annex with accommodation rooms was built for train drivers of the Württemberg Railways. A 12-metre turntable was built in front of the engine shed, with a watering point as well as a head and a side loading ramp. A total of 2,740 m of new track was laid and 1,080 m of old track was lifted and re-laid. 2,090 m of track was moved and 1,585 m of track was raised by 20 to 30 centimetres. 13 new sets of points, one of them British, were installed, 15 were removed and re-used, two overlapping sets of points were inserted and two sets of points were moved.

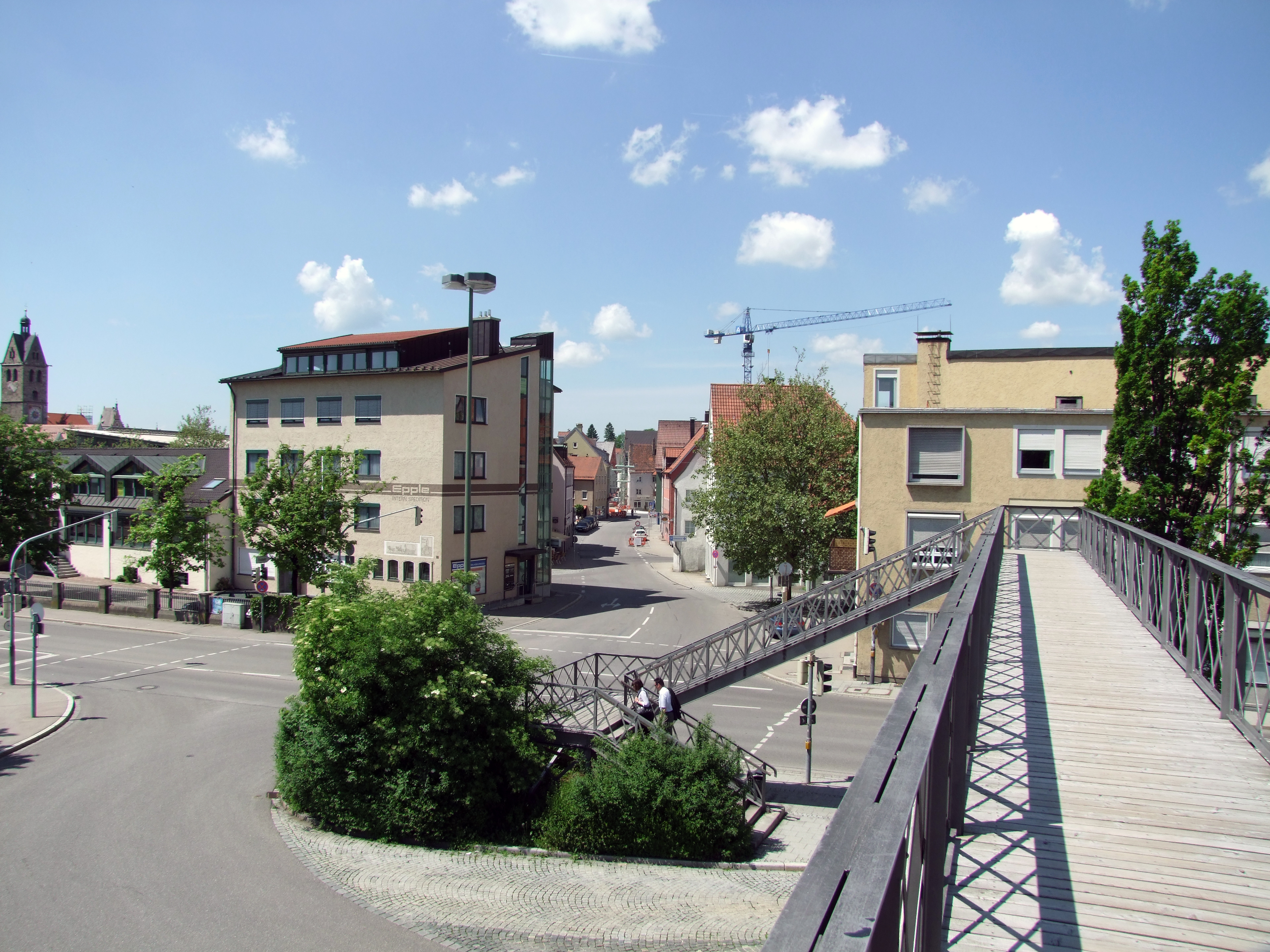
The Iron Bridge

The roundhouse was moved from the west to the northeast side of the Augsburger Strasse level crossing. So foreign rail traffic could be generally carried out on the current tracks 11 to 13 without affecting the operations of the Royal Bavarian State Railways. A loading facility was moved and extended by 20 m and the accommodation building was raised by one floor. In 1889, a 17,133 ton iron bridge was built for pedestrian traffic just north of the town's stream and moved further north 19 years later.

=== Extension and expansion ===
The line to Leutkirch was opened on 2 October 1889. From 1890 to 1893 extensive changes and additions to the tracks were necessary. The freight yard and the loading tracks were extended. The main platform gained an iron platform canopy. Shelters were built for the growing number of employees (in 1913 there were 155 railway workers).

The post office moved to its own premises in 1893 and the site became a railway station only. On 22 October 1900, the Ungerhausen-Ottobeuren railway was opened with its trains normally running to and from Memmingen. Finally, on 23 June 1904, the Memmingen–Legau railway was opened.

A new freight shed and office was completed in the 1909. The old freight hall on track 13 was converted into another residential building for rail staff. A year later, a carriage cleaning shed was opened at the Württemberg locomotive depot.

The width of the platforms was not wide enough for passengers or freight transport. From 1916 to 1919, they were rebuilt and the railway tracks in the passenger station were extended. The removal of the Bavarian locomotive shed and the watering point was required to make room for this work. The platforms were extended and provided with a wooden canopy and a platform underpass to give access. The remaining works and the construction of a building next to the station building were not completed until 1921 due to World War I.

=== World War II ===
Towards the end of World War II, the railway junction and the adjacent air base were the target of several raids. On 20 July 1944, the first attack caused major damage on the passenger part of the station. Harm to passengers and damage to rolling stock was averted by the evacuation of four passenger trains. After intensive clearing and repair work train operations were recommenced shortly afterwards. The most devastating air raid was on 20 April 1945.

[...] Engine shed and accommodation buildings suffered very heavy damage to roofs, windows and masonry, ... water crane and turntable were slightly damaged, 36 wagons were destroyed, 88 were heavily damaged, 64 were lightly damaged. Memmingen station was hit by 78 heavy bombs between signal boxes I and III .... exits to Kempten, Leutkirch and Legau were disrupted. It was only still possible to operate in passenger part of station and to Ulm and Buchloe. All tracks between signal boxes I and III and 20 sets of points were destroyed. To the east of the station, the group of sidings was almost completely destroyed. 20 m of the eastern part of the steel footbridge over the tracks at signal box III collapsed. ... 18 soldiers, 3 railway men, 1 Polish wife and 1 Polish worker were killed. 165 soldiers were slightly wounded. Signal boxes I and II were damaged by splinters. ... The power supply system for the relay interlocking in signal box II was severely damaged. ... The water tower was heavily damaged ... half the freight shed was completely destroyed, half was seriously damaged. ... The overnight accommodation building on Riedbachstrasse, including outbuildings, the staff residential buildings II and III, all platform roofs, the old freight shed and the train shop building were badly damaged for the most part. ... Half of the concrete transshipment platforms in the freight hall were destroyed.

— Report of the Augsburg Railway Administration

On 26 April 1945, U.S. forces marched in, so the Second World War ended for Memmingen. The rehabilitation of the shattered infrastructure left a heavy burden of debt. After traffic was restored, rationalisation measures started in the early fifties. The Memmingen track supervisor's office (Bahnmeisterei) no 2 was closed on 1 September 1953 and the Memmingen operations office was dissolved on 1 May 1954.

=== Extension of the bus station and demolitions ===
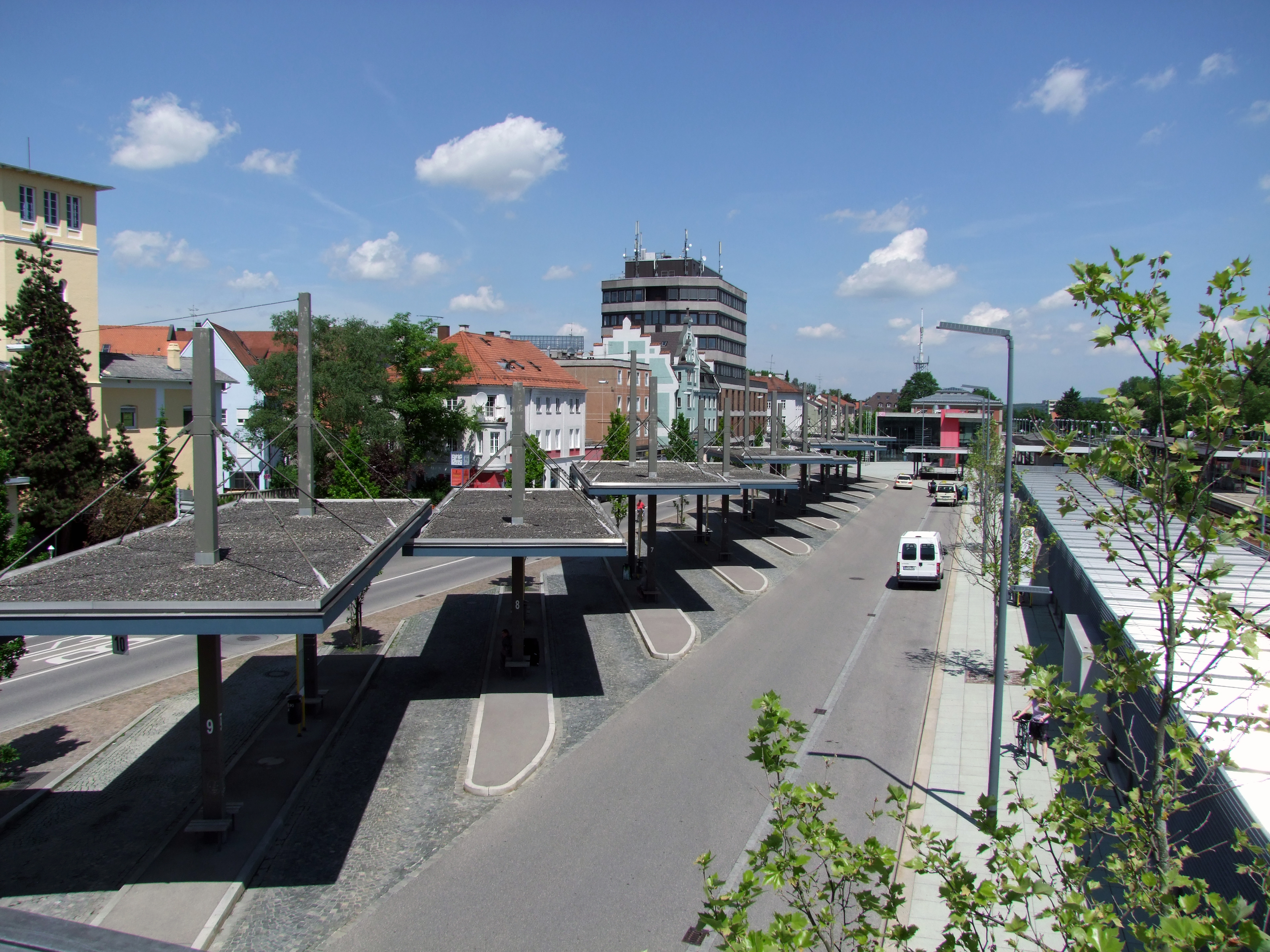
The central bus station

To relieve the crowded station forecourt, a bus station was built south of the station building at the end of the 1960s, which was upgraded as the zentraler Omnibusbahnhof (central bus station, ZOB) in 1982. The bay platform track 12 was demolished to add an additional through track; this platform had become dispensable, especially since the closure of passenger and freight traffic on the branch line to Legau on 28 May 1972.

In the 1970s, the track plan was simplified as a result of various rationalisations. This applied particularly to connections in the freight depot. After the depot's water tower was closed in 1976, the roundhouse and turntable were demolished in 1983. Only the massive structure of the roundhouse remained and it continues to be used for accommodation.

With sidings 21 to 23 having a good design for turning wagons around, the remains of track 13 and track 10 could be dismantled in the mid-eighties. While several new sidings were built in the 1970s, it has not been possible to stop the decline in freight transport since the mid-eighties.

=== Recent history ===
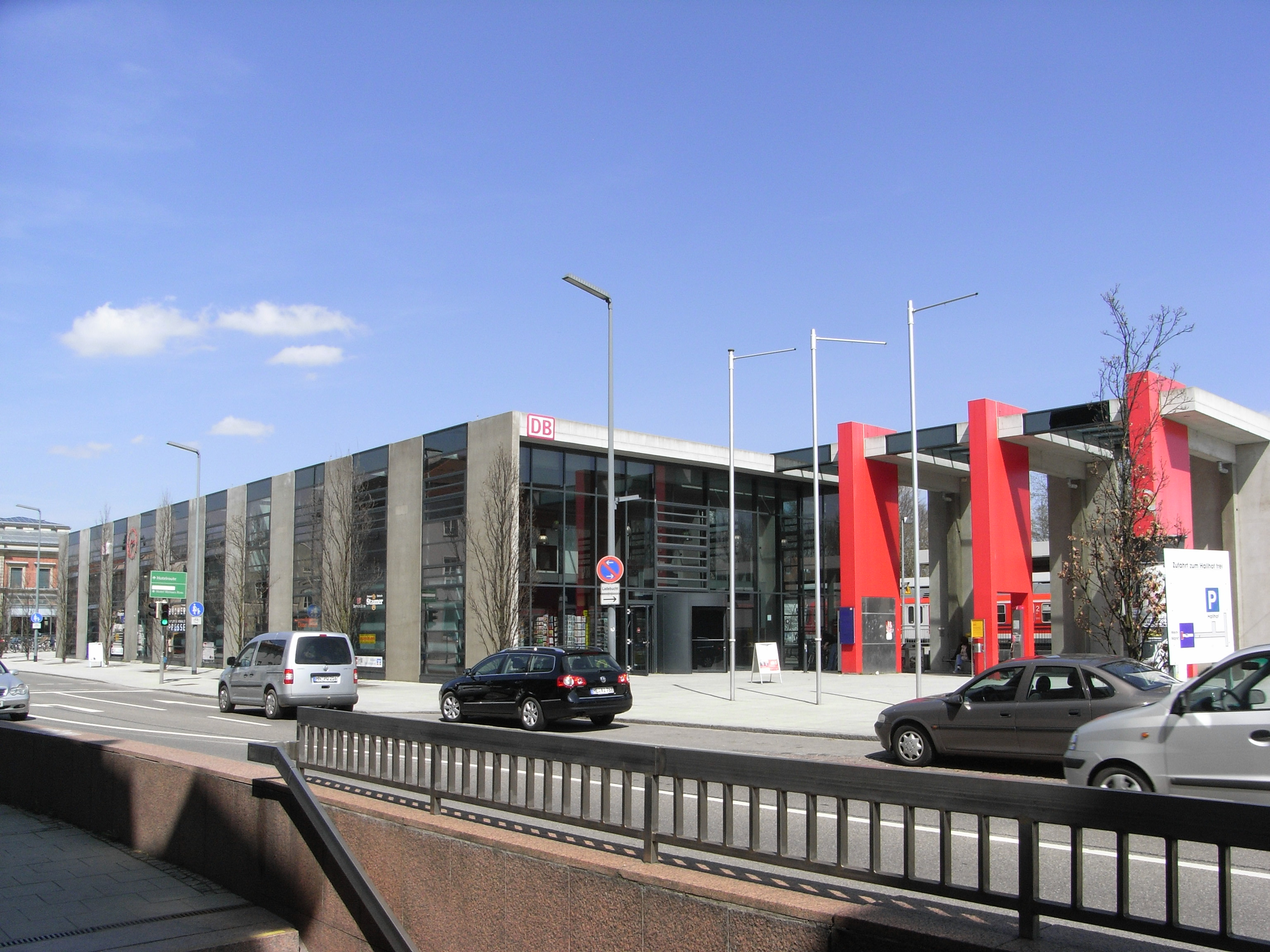
The new station building

In 1980, an attempt was made to make up the lost ground in the transport of swap bodies with the establishment of a container yard. On 30 May 1976, Memmingen, became a rail node during the rationalisation of freight operations. On 25 September 1988, the node was included in the area of operations of Neu-Ulm.

The first major project was the replacement of the Augsburgerstraße level crossing with an underpass for bicycle and pedestrian traffic only, which was completed in 1999. Since the underpass ran directly at the northern end of the platforms, an extension was made to the platform between tracks two and three. This led to the modernisation and raising of all the platforms. The platform edges, which were previously only about 20 cm high, were a significant obstacle to passengers changing trains. The rebuilding of the platforms included the replacement of the old wooden platform canopies. A modern passenger information system replaced the antiquated train route indicator with plug-in steel plates. The new station was opened in 2001. A modular approach that could have been used throughout Germany for new station buildings was used. Because of its high cost, Deutsche Bahn, however, did not apply this system to other similar railway buildings, so it was the only modular station.

== Signal boxes ==
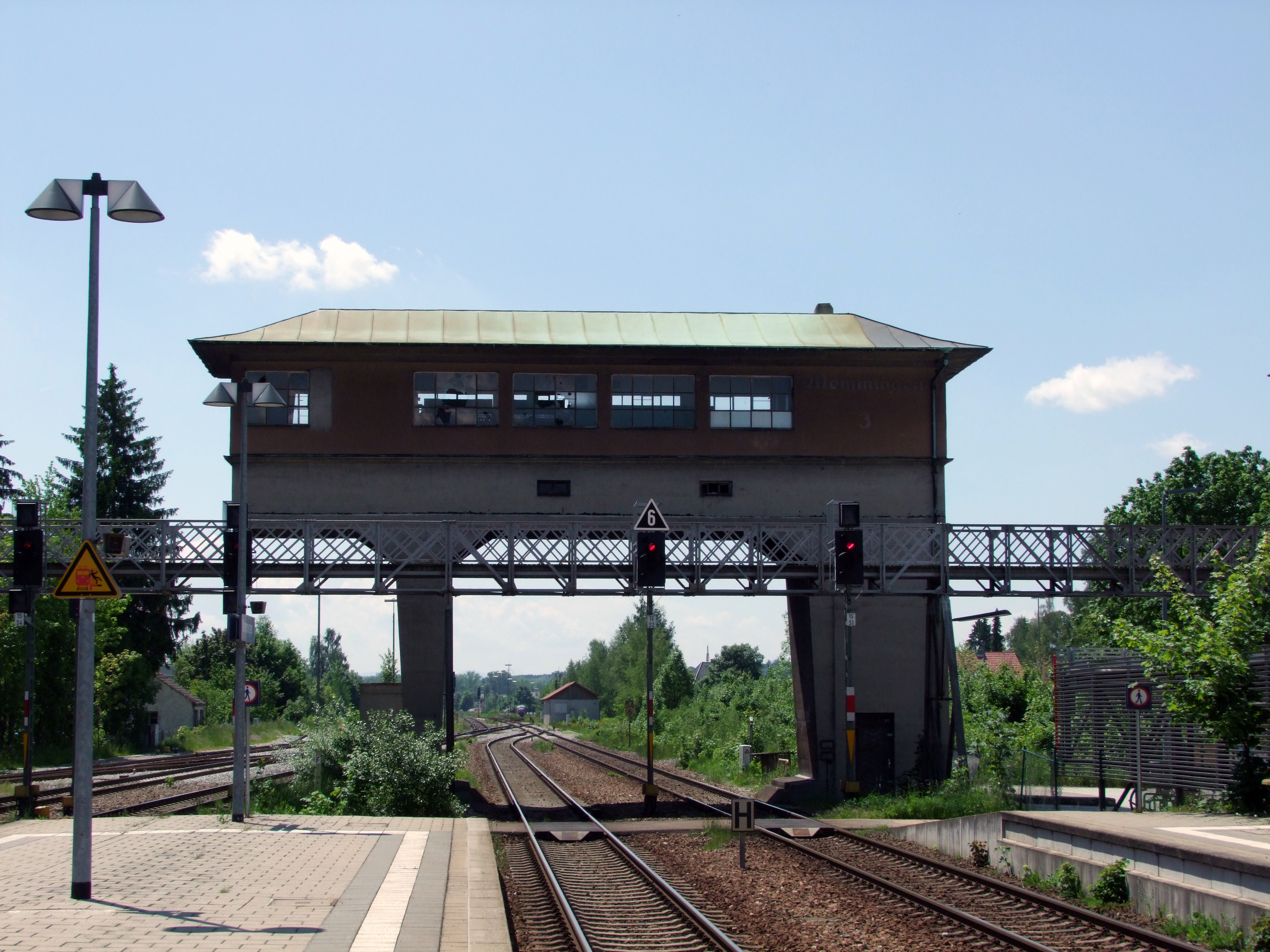
Signal box 3

From 1932 to 1934 there was an electro-mechanical interlocking system of class VES 1912 with four interlockings. In 1932, signalbox 4 in Augsburger Strasse and the train dispatching centre 3 went into operation.

Signal box 2 was switched on at the junction of routes to Kempten and Legau and Leutkirch in 1933 and a year later signal box 1 was completed at the southern end of the station at the former hump.

== Operations ==
=== Long distance passenger services ===
Memmingen station has regular EuroCityExpress connections towards Munich and Zurich, as well as a daily intercity service between the Ruhr and Oberstdorf. The Ulm–Kempten section is part of the important passenger route between Bavarian Allgäu and Baden-Württemberg in the south and central and northern Germany. In the 2026 timetable, the following long-distance services stopped at the station:

Train class	Route	Frequency
ICE 55	Dortmund – Essen – Düsseldorf – Cologne – Bonn – Koblenz – Mainz – Mannheim – Heidelberg – Stuttgart – Ulm – Memmingen – Kempten – Oberstdorf	One train pair
ECE 88	Munich – Buchloe – Memmingen – Lindau-Reutin – Zürich	Six pairs of trains

=== Regional services ===
Trains meet at the station at regular intervals (on the hour) resulting in good transport connectivity in all directions. In the 2026 timetable, the following regional services stopped at the station:

Train class	Route	Frequency
RE 71	Augsburg – Bobingen – Buchloe – Mindelheim – Memmingen	Every 2 hours
RE 72	München – Geltendorf – Kaufering – Buchloe – Türkheim – Mindelheim – Memmingen (– Lindau-Insel)	Every 2 hours
RE 75	Ulm – Memmingen – Kempten – Immenstadt – Sonthofen – Fischen – Oberstdorf	Every hour
RE 96	Munich – Buchloe – Memmingen – Kißlegg – Lindau-Insel – Lindau-Reutin	Every 2 hours
RB 92	Memmingen – Kißlegg – Wangen – Hergatz – Lindau-Reutin	Every 2 hours
RS 7	Ulm – Neu-Ulm – Senden – Altenstadt – Memmingen	Every hour

== Freight ==
Until 1980, the volume of freight traffic in the station increased considerably. This was due to the general increase in production of industrial enterprises and the construction of a variety of sidings. This ever-increasing volume of freight required the extension of the tracks, which happened in several stages. Towards Kempten there was a separate freight yard with crossovers for entry and exit as well as a hump.

== See also ==
- Rail transport in Germany
- Railway stations in Germany
