= Bayerische Eisenbahngesellschaft =

- Company type: GmbH (government-owned)
- Industry: rail transport
- Founded: 1995
- Headquarters: Munich, Germany
- Area served: Bavaria
- Key people: Thomas Prechtl, Managing director
- Owner: Free State of Bavaria
- Website: bahnland-bayern.de/beg

Bayerische Eisenbahngesellschaft (BEG; German for Bavarian Railways Company) is the passenger transport company for regional railways in Bavaria. Founded in 1995, it is organised as a GmbH wholly owned by the Bavarian Government. The company does not provide any services or own tracks or rolling stock. Instead, it purchases services from railway companies that actually operate the trains.

== History ==
In 1995, when the Act on the Regionalisation of Public Local Passenger Transport (Gesetz zur Regionalisierung des öffentlichen Personennahverkehrs) transferred the responsibility for local passenger transport from the federal government to the Länder, the Bavarian Ministry of Economy, Infrastructure, Traffic and Technology founded the Bayerische Eisenbahngesellschaft to organise the local passenger rail transport in Bavaria. Owing to the market situation at that time, in 1996 it awarded the contract for most of the network to Deutsche Bahn, the national rail company owned by the federal government, without public tender.

The first contract put out for public tendering in 1998 was the operation of the railway lines between Munich and the Bavarian Oberland and was eventually awarded to Bayerische Oberlandbahn, a newly founded subsidiary of Connex (now Transdev GmbH). However, improvements planned for the service were hampered by technical difficulties caused by the Integral trains, which were a completely new model that had not been used before.

Since 2003, more and more railway services have been converted to contracts awarded on the basis of competitive tendering, which contracts awarded to Regentalbahn, DB Regio, Transdev GmbH, BeNEX and others.
