= Günzburg–Mindelheim railway =

Railway line in Germany

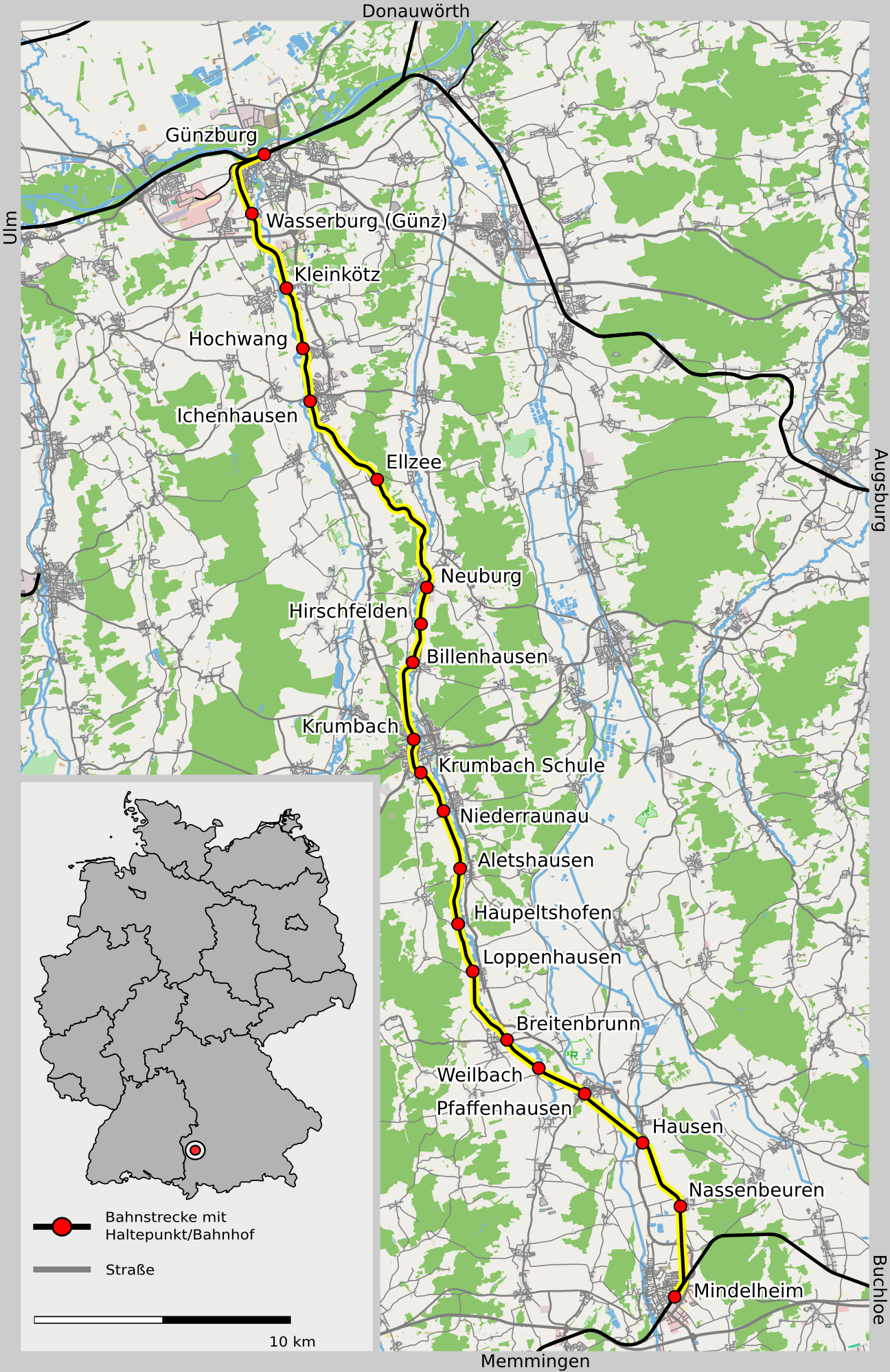

Overview
- Native name: Mittelschwabenbahn
- Line number: 5351
- Locale: Bavaria, Germany
- Termini: Günzburg; Mindelheim

Service
- Route number: 978

Technical
- Line length: 55.124 km (34.252 mi)
- Track gauge: 1,435 mm (4 ft 8 1/2 in) standard gauge
- Minimum radius: 246.5 m (809 ft)
- Operating speed: 80 km/h (49.7 mph) (maximum)
- Maximum incline: 2.5%

The Günzburg–Mindelheim railway (also known in German as the Mittelschwabenbahn—Central Swabian Railway) is a single-tracked branch line in Bavaria which is approximately 55 kilometres long. The railway connects Günzburg and Mindelheim via Krumbach and so the Ulm–Augsburg railway (Munich-Augsburg-Ulm-Stuttgart) and the railway from Munich to Zurich via Buchloe, Memmingen and Lindau.

== History ==
The Günzburg–Krumbach section was opened in 1892 and it was followed by the Mindelheim–Pfaffhausen section as part of the Mindelheim–Kirchheim railway in 1909. The gap from Krumbach to Pfaffhausen was closed in 1910. The section to Kirchheim has since been closed.

The line between Gunzburg and Mindelheim has been threatened with closure several times, but it has always been averted. Between 1963 and 1998, a major reason for the preservation of the railway was that the southern section between Breitenbrunn and Mindelheim was used for the transport of oil by rail in tankers from the Bedernau oil field. General freight was closed in 1997. Passenger traffic is currently not threatened with closure, because the track has been modernised, reducing travel times and improving access to the main lines in Günzburg and Mindelheim.

A total of six railcars of Class 642 of DB Regio Allgäu-Schwaben have operated on the line from Augsburg since October 2001. Since December 2002, there trains have been accelerated and additional services have been added, sometimes running to Ulm and Memmingen. The Central Swabian Railway is equipped with a new form of signalling used on branch lines called Signalisierter Zugleitbetrieb (SZB). Crossing stations are in Ichenhausen, Krumbach and Pfaffhausen, movements are controlled by the signalman in Mindelheim. The trains are parked overnight at Krumbach (Schwab) station.

To speed up the operation, all stations except Gunzburg, Ichenhausen, Krumbach (Schwab), Krumbach (Schw) Schule, Pfaffhausen and Mindelheim have been converted to request stops.
