= Günzburg station =

Railway station in Günzburg, Germany

Günzburg
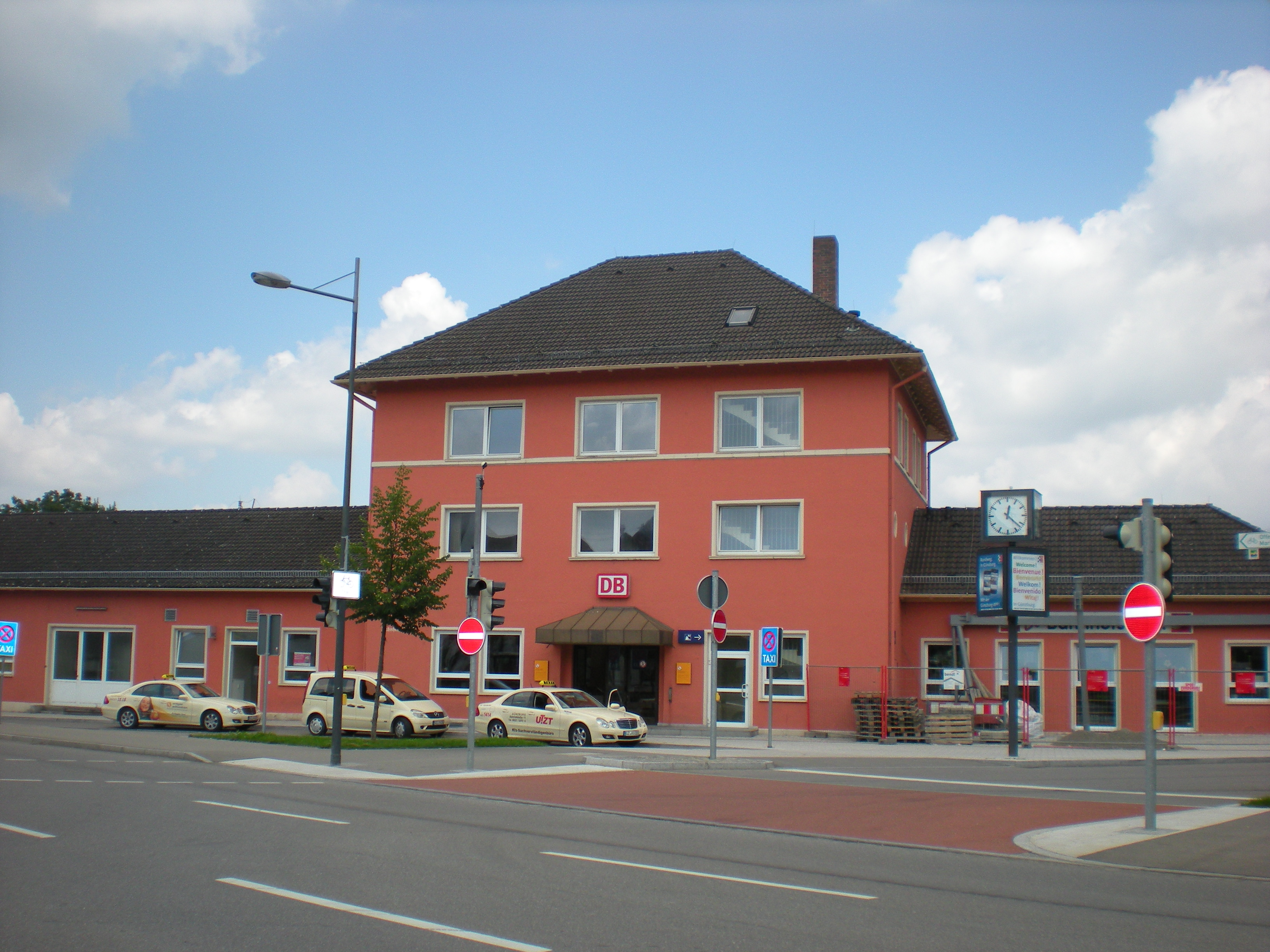
- Street side of the entrance building

General information
- Location: Günzburg, Bavaria; Germany
- Coordinates: 48°27′37″N 10°16′43″E
- Owner: Deutsche Bahn
- Operator: DB Netz; DB Station&Service
- Lines: Augsburg–Ulm (KBS 980); Günzburg–Mindelheim (KBS 978)
- Platforms: 6 (including 1 bay platform)
- Connections: Stadtbus Günzburg: 856; Regionalbus: 818, 850, 851, 852, 854, 855, 856, 859, 869, 871, 894; Rufbus: 818R, 852R, 871R

Construction
- Accessible: Yes

Other information
- Station code: 2422
- DS100 code: MGZB
- IBNR: 8000139
- Category: 3
- Website: stationsdatenbank.de; www.bahnhof.de

History
- Opened: 26 September 1853
Services
Preceding station	DB Fernverkehr	Following station
Ulm Hbf One-way operation	ICE 11	Augsburg Hbf towards München Hbf
Ulm Hbf towards Köln Hbf	ICE 42 only ICE 618, 619	Augsburg Hbf towards München Hbf
Ulm Hbf towards Basel SBB	ICE 60	Augsburg Hbf towards München Hbf
Neu-Ulm One-way operation	ICE 60	Augsburg Hbf towards München Hbf
Ulm Hbf towards Frankfurt (Main) Hbf or Münster Hbf	ICE 62	Augsburg Hbf towards Graz Hbf
Ulm Hbf towards Frankfurt (Main) Hbf	ICE 89	Augsburg Hbf towards St. Anton am Arlberg
Preceding station		Following station
Leipheim towards Ulm Hbf	RE 9	Offingen towards München Hbf
Preceding station	DB Regio Bayern	Following station
Terminus	RB 78	Wasserburg (Günz) towards Mindelheim
Preceding station		Following station
Leipheim towards Ulm Hbf	RB 15	Gundelfingen a. d. Donau towards Ingolstadt Hbf
Preceding station		Following station
Ulm Hbf toward Stuttgart Hbf	WESTbahn	Augsburg Hbf toward Wien Westbahnhof
Location
- Location within Bavaria Location within Germany Location within Europe

Gunzburg station is an important Swabian railway junction and the only station of the large district town of Günzburg in the German state of Bavaria. The town also has the Wasserburg (Günz) station on the Central Swabian Railway (German: Mittelschwabenbahn). The station has six platform tracks and is classified by Deutsche Bahn as a category 3 station. It is served daily by about 125 trains of Deutsche Bahn and Agilis. The Central Swabian Railway branches from the Ulm–Augsburg railway at Günzburg station.

== Location ==
The station is located northwest of the town center of Günzburg. To its south is the station forecourt (Bahnhofplatz), through which Siemensstraße runs. To the West Auweg passes under the tracks through an underpass. Wiesweg runs to the north of the station. The station building is located south of the tracks and has the address of Bahnhofsplatz 5.

== History ==
The station was opened together with the Neu-Ulm–Burgau section of the Bavarian Maximilian’s Railway (Bayerische Maximiliansbahn) on 26 September 1853. The whole Ulm–Munich route was finally completed on 1 May 1854. The Central Swabian Railway was completed from Günzburg to Krumbach in 1892 and it was extended to Mindelheim in 1910. From 2006 to 2009 the station was modernised at a cost of €8.3 million. The modernised station area was opened by the then Transport Minister, Wolfgang Tiefensee on 27 April 2009.

== Infrastructure ==
The station has five tracks next to three platforms. Attached to the “home” platform 1 (next to the station building) is a bay platform for trains to Mindelheim (platform 1a). All platforms are covered and have digital destination displays. The central platforms are connected to the main platform by a pedestrian tunnel and are equipped with lifts to make the platforms accessible.

=== Platform data ===
Platforms lengths and heights are as follows:

- Platform 1a: length 140 m, height 55 cm
- Platform 1: length 250 m, height 55 cm
- Platform 2: length 405 m, height 76 cm
- Platform 3: length 405 m, height 76 cm
- Platform 4: length 210 m, height 55 cm
- Platform 5: length 210 m, height 55 cm

== Operations ==
=== Long distance services ===
Günzburg is served at two-hour intervals by InterCity and EuroCity trains on line 62 connecting Frankfurt and Salzburg. In addition a pair of Intercity-Express trains stop at Gunzburg. All other InterCity and Intercity-Express trains pass through the station without stopping. In the 2026 timetable, the following long-distance services stopped at the station:

Line	Route		Frequency
ICE 11	Wiesbaden → Mainz → Mannheim → Stuttgart → Ulm → Günzburg → Augsburg → Munich		1 train
ICE 42	Köln – Wiesbaden – Mainz – Mannheim – Heidelberg – Stuttgart – Ulm – Günzburg – Augsburg – München		1 train pair
ICE 60	(Basel SBB ← Müllheim ← Freiburg ← Offenburg ← Baden-Baden ←) Karlsruhe – Bruchsal – Stuttgart – Ulm – Günzburg – Augsburg – Munich		2 train pairs
ICE 62	Frankfurt – Darmstadt – Heidelberg –	Stuttgart – Ulm – Günzburg – Augsburg – Munich – Rosenheim – Salzburg – Villach – Klagenfurt – Graz	2 train pairs
ICE 62	Münster – Essen – Düsseldorf – Köln Messe/Deutz – Frankfurt Airport – Mannheim –	Stuttgart – Ulm – Günzburg – Augsburg – Munich – Rosenheim – Salzburg – Villach – Klagenfurt – Graz	One train pair
	Stuttgart – Ulm – Günzburg – Augsburg – München – München Ost – Rosenheim – Salzburg – Linz – Wien Westbahnhof		Some trains

=== Regional services ===
In the 2026 timetable, the following regional services stopped at the station:

Line	Route	Frequency	Operator
RE 9	(Munich –) Augsburg – Günzburg – Neu-Ulm – Ulm	Hourly	Arverio Bayern
RB 78	Günzburg – Krumbach (Schwaben) (– Mindelheim)	Hourly	DB Regio AG
RB 15	Ulm – Neu-Ulm – Günzburg – Donauwörth – Ingolstadt (– Ingolstadt Nord)	Hourly Mon–Fri, every 2 hours Sat and Sun	Agilis Verkehrsgesellschaft

== Gallery ==
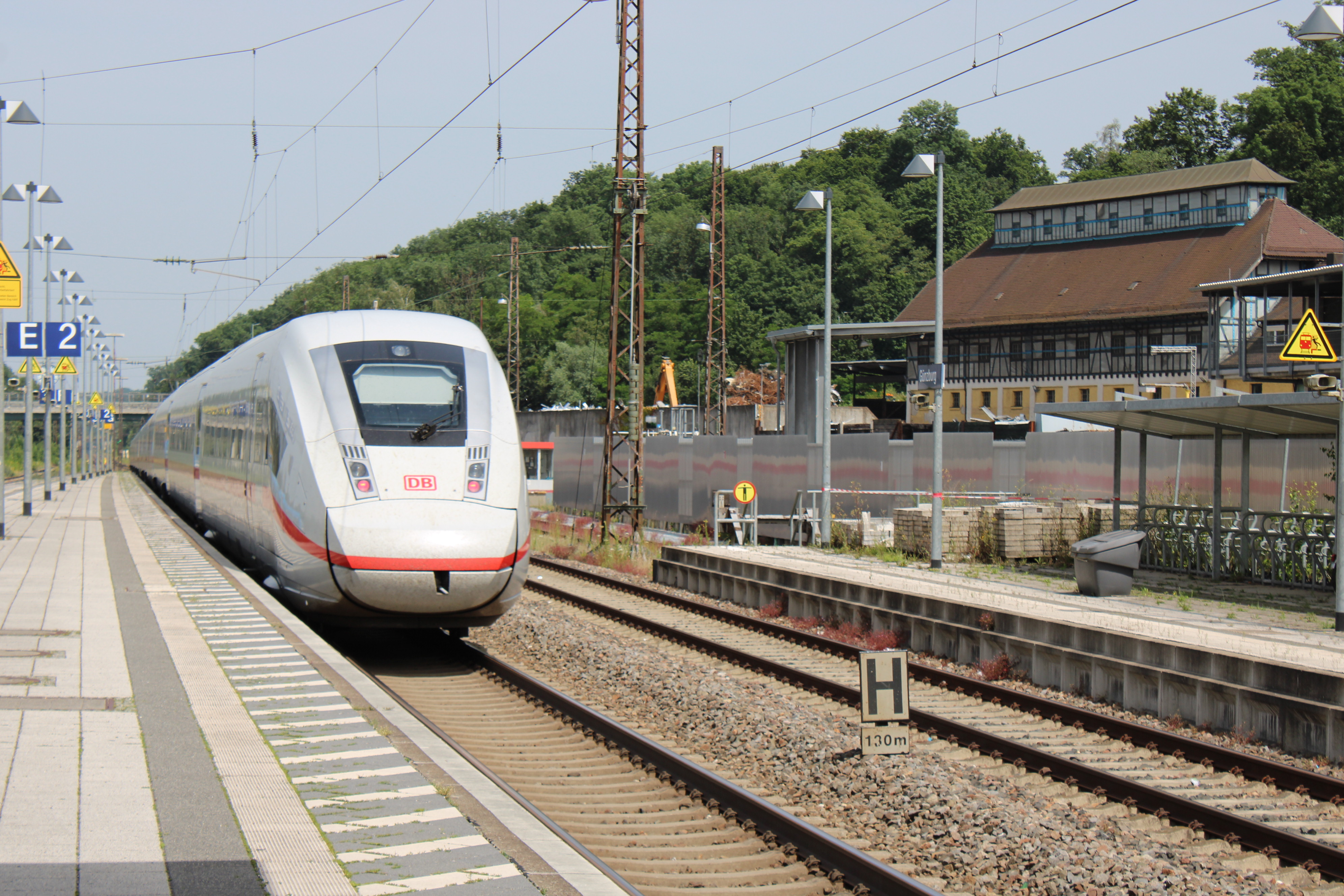
ICE 4 in Günzburg passing through towards Munich.

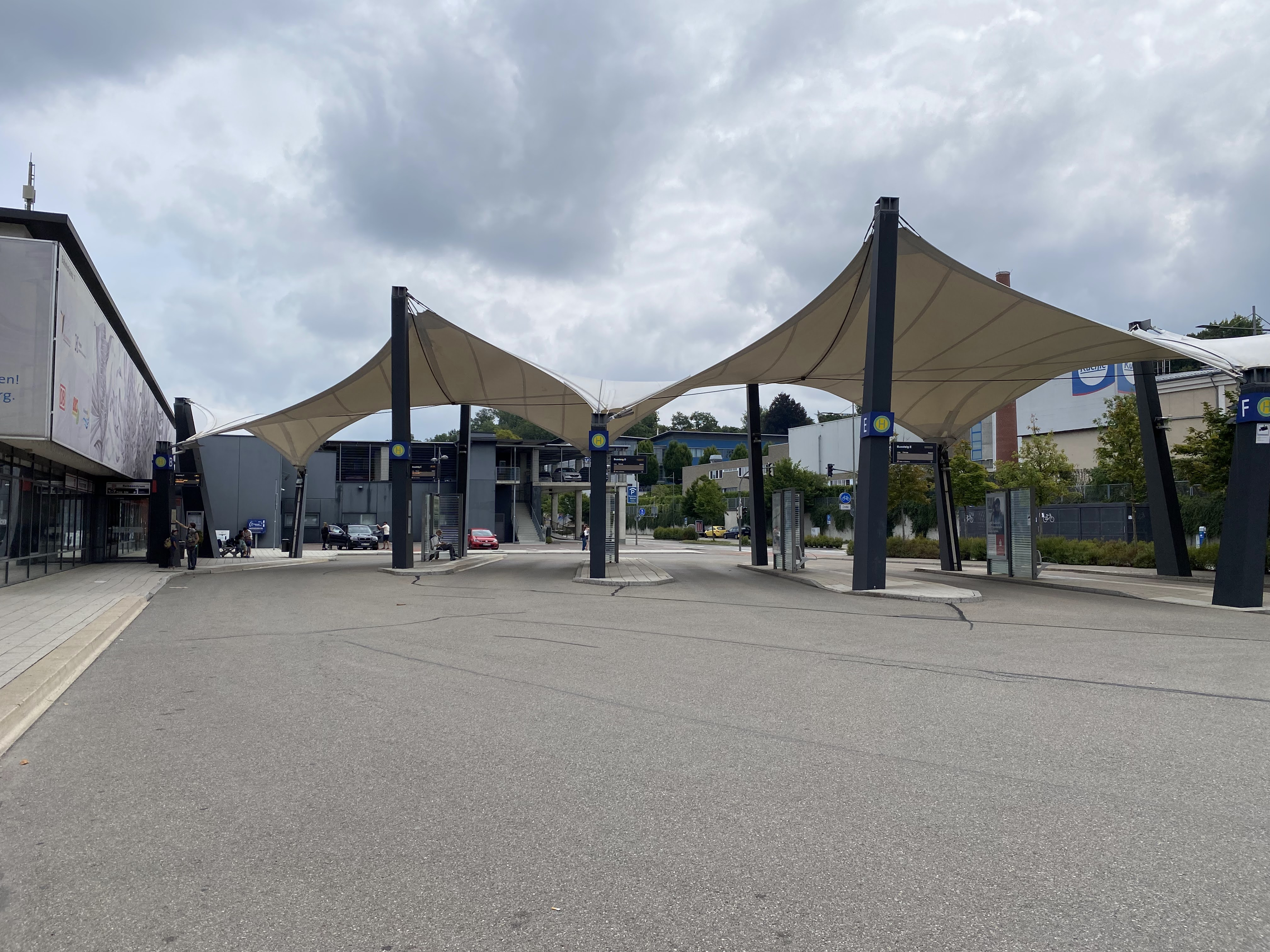
Bus station in front of Günzburg train station

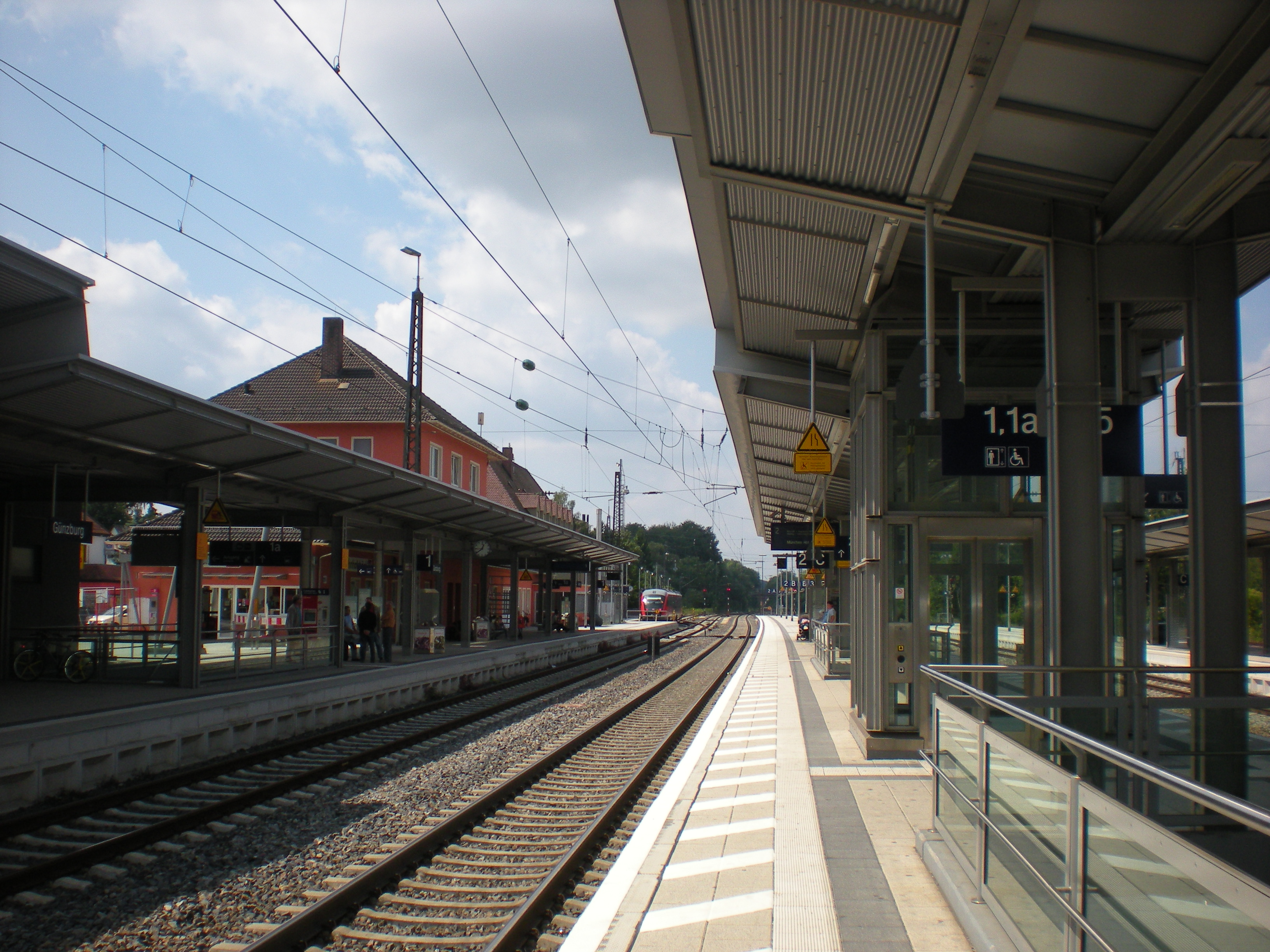
Platforms at Günzburg station
