= Neu-Ulm–Kempten railway =

Railway line in Germany

Neu-Ulm–Kempten

Overview
- Native name: Illertalbahn
- Line number: 975, 976 (Senden–Neu-Ulm)
- Termini: Neu-Ulm; Kempten

Service
- Route number: 5302 (Ulm–Neu-Ulm); 5400 (Neu-Ulm–Kempten); 5362 (Kempten–Immenstadt); 5402 (Immenstadt–Oberstdorf)

Technical
- Line length: 86.65 km (53.84 mi)
- Number of tracks: 1
- Track gauge: 1,435 mm (4 ft 8 1/2 in) standard gauge
- Operating speed: 140 km/h (87 mph) (maximum)

The Neu-Ulm–Kempten railway is a mostly single track and non-electrified main line from Neu-Ulm via Memmingen to Kempten in the German state of Bavaria. It follows the Iller river for its entire length and is therefore also called the Iller Valley Railway (German: Illertalbahn). The line from Neu-Ulm to Kellmünz is integrated in the Donau-Iller-Nahverkehrsverbund (Danube-Iller Local Transport Association, DING). It is listed in the timetable under the number of 975; between New Ulm and Memmingen it is also served by services running on route 756.

== History ==
Kempten citizens proposed a railway line to Ulm via Memmingen in 1843, as the construction of dams and water mills during the period of industrialisation had ended raft traffic on the river Iller and road transport was not viable. The Bavarian government, however, was not interested in further construction in this area.

Because Memmingen was not then included in plans for the first railways in the country, the city took the initiative to build the Iller Valley Railway. It granted a concession on 13 September 1861 for the original 85 km (53 mi) long route that branched off the state railway from Neu-Ulm and ran up the river to Kempten. It advanced a loan of about 3.5 million guilders and was responsible for land acquisition and construction activities. The first section was opened to Memmingen on 12 October 1862 and the second section was opened on 1 June 1863. To finance the construction of the line, the cities of Memmingen and Kempten established a private company with a loan.

The State Railways acquired the rolling stock and ran operations on the line, which it leased. Because of the more than local importance of the railway, Bavaria acquired it on 12 April 1876 and the private company was therefore relieved of its mortgage.

Since the completion of the Neu-Ulm 21 project in 2009, the Neu-Ulm-Kempten line has been duplicated from Neu-Ulm Finningerstraße station to Neu-Ulm station. The continuation of the line over the Danube has also been duplicated so that the line runs to Ulm Central Station (Hauptbahnhof) independently of the Augsburg-Ulm railway.

== Development plans ==
Deutsche Bahn plans to upgrade the line for a top speed of 160 km/h (99 mph). This requires the closure of some smaller crossings and adjustments at the remaining crossings, and may be delayed due to complaints.

== Operations ==
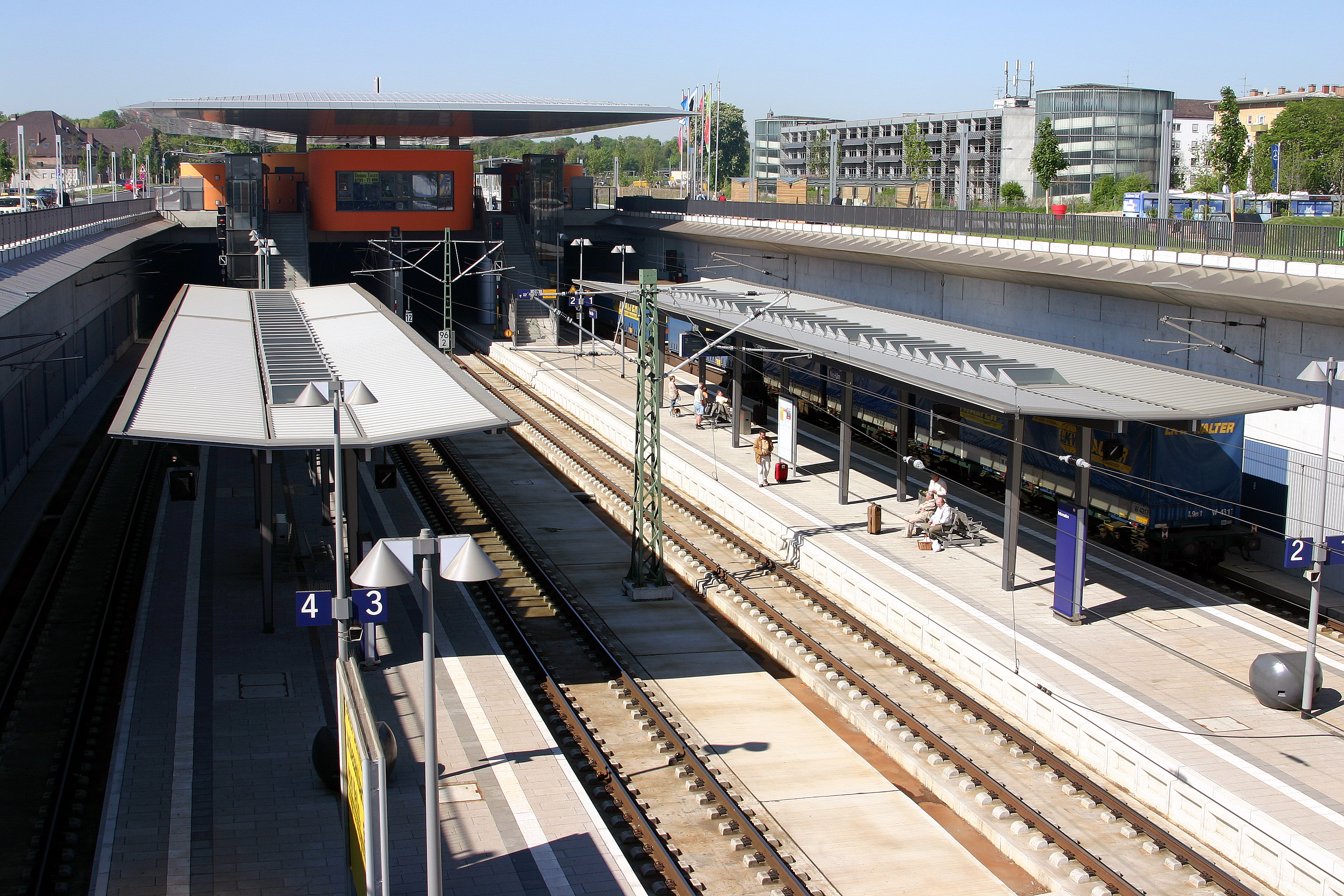
Neu-Ulm station

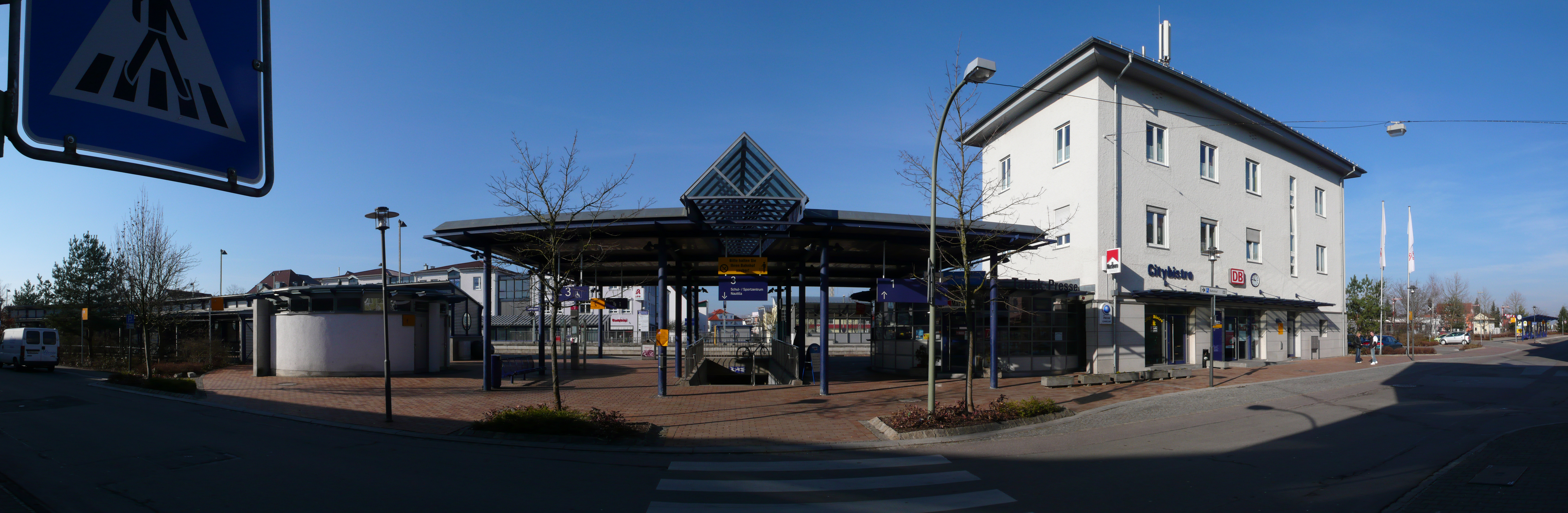
Illertissen station

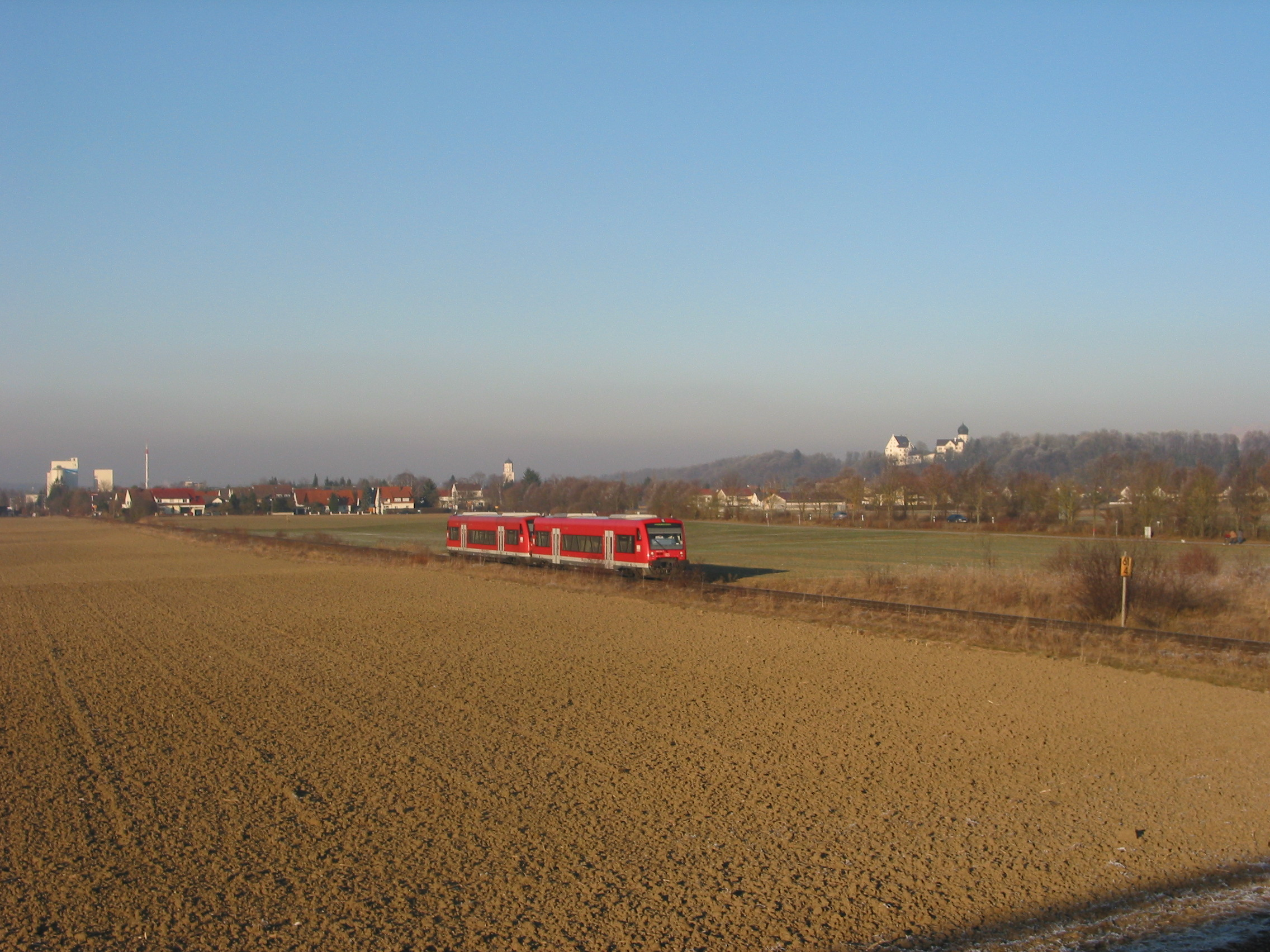
Regionalbahn service (class 650) south of Illertissen, Martinskirche and Vöhlinschloss behind

The RE 75 Regional-Express service runs hourly from Ulm to Kempten and Oberstdorf, using Pesa Link diesel multiple units. Services on line RS 7 of the Danube-Iller Regional S-Bahn run from Ulm to Memmingen hourly. Additionally hourly services run from Ulm to Weißenhorn, using the Neu-Ulm–Kempten railway as far as Senden. The S-Bahn services are operated with Alstom Coradia LINT sets.

=== Intercity Allgäu ===
A pair of Intercity trains called Allgäu run from Hanover via Ulm to Oberstdorf and back. The trains runs from Ulm as Regional-Express services and can be used with local tickets. Between Stuttgart and Immenstadt it is hauled by two diesel locomotives of class 218.
