= Fuck (disambiguation) =

Fuck is an English term for the act of sexual intercourse, also used as an intensifier or interjection, and generally considered vulgar.

Fuck or fucks may also refer to:

== People ==
- Johann Fück (1894–1974), German orientalist
- Karl Wilhelm Gottlieb Leopold Fuckel, botanist, sometimes abbreviated Fuck., to refer to him when citing a botanical name
- Argel Fucks (born 1974), Brazilian footballer
- Ralf Fücks (born 1951), German politician
- Reinhardt Adolfo Fuck, Brazilian geologist

== Art, entertainment, and media ==
=== Film ===
- Fuck, aka Blue Movie, a 1969 film by Andy Warhol
- Fuck (2005 film), a documentary about the word

=== Literature ===
- Fuck: Word Taboo and Protecting Our First Amendment Liberties (2009), a non-fiction book by Christopher M. Fairman that followed up an eponymous 2007 article published in the Cardozo Law Review
- Fuck (1991–1993 serial), by Chester Brown compiled as the graphic novel I Never Liked You (1994)
- Erasure, a 2001 novel by Percival Everett, contains within it a novel titled Fuck, written by the protagonist of Erasure.

=== Music ===
==== Groups ====
- Fuck (band), an American indie rock band formed in 1993

==== Albums ====
- Fuck (album), an album by the band Fuck
- Fuck (EP), by Buckcherry
- For Unlawful Carnal Knowledge (F.U.C.K.), an album by Van Halen

==== Songs ====
- "Foxtrot Uniform Charlie Kilo" ("F.U.C.K"), a song by the Bloodhound Gang
- "Fuck", a song by Bring Me the Horizon from their album There Is a Hell Believe Me I've Seen It. There Is a Heaven Let's Keep It a Secret
- "Fuck", a song by Lola Young from her album This Wasn't Meant for You Anyway

== Science ==
- fucK, the gene name for the gene that encodes the enzyme L-Fuculose kinase

== Other ==
- Slang for semen
- The Fuck Tree, a tree on London's Hampstead Heath that facilitates gay sex
- Free Universal Construction Kit (F.U.C.K.), a 3D-printable open source construction toy

== See also ==
- F-word (disambiguation)
- Fuck It (disambiguation)
- Fuck me (disambiguation)
- Fuck the Police (disambiguation)
- Fuck the World (disambiguation)
- Fuck You (disambiguation)
- Fucking (disambiguation)
- Holy fuck (disambiguation)
- WTF (disambiguation)
- FCUK, an alternative international name for French Connection clothing line's UK operation
- "Fack", a song by Eminem
- Fock, a surname (including a list of people with the name)
- Focker (disambiguation)
- Fook (disambiguation)
- For Unlawful Carnal Knowledge (disambiguation)
- FUC (disambiguation)
- Fuk (disambiguation)
- Fuca (disambiguation)
- Fuchs (disambiguation)
- P.H.U.Q., album by the Wildhearts
