= FO =

Fo or FO may refer to:

== Arts and entertainment ==
- Fallout (video game), a 1997 video game
- Fo Fai, a character in the Battle Arena Toshinden video game series
- Folio (printing), a book size, the page number of books, or sheets with multiple printed pages
- Foreign Objects (band), a Pennsylvania music group
- FunOrb, a 2008 Java-based gaming website

== Businesses and organisations ==
- Par Avion (airline) (IATA airline designator), airline of Tasmania, Australia
- Family office, an investing office controlled by a family
- Felix Airways (IATA airline designator), a regional airline of Yemen
- Football Outsiders, a website devoted to statistical analysis of the NFL
- Force Ouvrière, a French trade unions confederation
- Foreign Office, a department of the United Kingdom government, currently named Foreign, Commonwealth and Development Office
- Flybondi (IATA airline designator), airline of Argentina

== Mathematics, science and technology ==
=== Computing ===
- FO (complexity), a complexity class
- .fo, the country code top level domain (ccTLD) for Faroe Islands
- Fiber optic
- XSL Formatting Objects (XSL-FO), a markup language

=== Other uses in mathematics, science, and technology ===
- Fan out (FO), number of loads at the output of a ring oscillator
- First-order logic, a system of mathematical logic
- Forsterite, magnesium-rich end-member in the olivine solid solution series
- Fourier number (Fo) in physics
- Fuel factor (F_{o}), used to check the accuracy of an emission measurement system
- Fuel oil, also called Furnace Oil
- FO, a subunit of F1FO type ATPase enzyme

== Military or aeronautical roles ==
- Field officer, a senior army officer
- First Officer, or co-pilot on an airliner
- Flying officer, a Royal Air Force rank
- Forward Observer, a soldier who directs artillery fire

== People ==
- Dario Fo (1926–2016), Italian playwright and Nobel laureate
- Fo Porter, a contestant on America's Next Top Model, Cycle 12
- Fó or Fú (佛、仏), the Chinese translation of the term Buddha
- Franco-ontarien, referring to a French-speaking citizen of the (largely anglophone) Canadian province of Ontario, Canada

== Places ==
- Faroe Islands, ISO 3166-1 country code, FO
  - .fo, the country code top level domain (ccTLD) for Faroe Islands
  - Faroese language (language code fo), a North Germanic language
- Fô Department of the Houet Province of Burkina Faso
- Fo, Burkina Faso, the chief town in Fo Department
- Province of Forlì, Italy
- Fort Ord, California

== Other uses ==
- Face Off (disambiguation)
- Faroese language (language code fo), a North Germanic language
- Foreign object (disambiguation)
- Front office, an area where visitors arrive and first encounter a staff at a place of business
- Fuck off (disambiguation), an English expletive, and various other meanings
- Furka Oberalp Railway, a Swiss railway
- Follow-on, a practice of making a team bat multiple innings in a row in cricket

== See also ==
- Foe (disambiguation)
- Pho
