= Associação Brasileira de Preservação Ferroviária =

Coordinates: 22.8587°S 47.0298°W

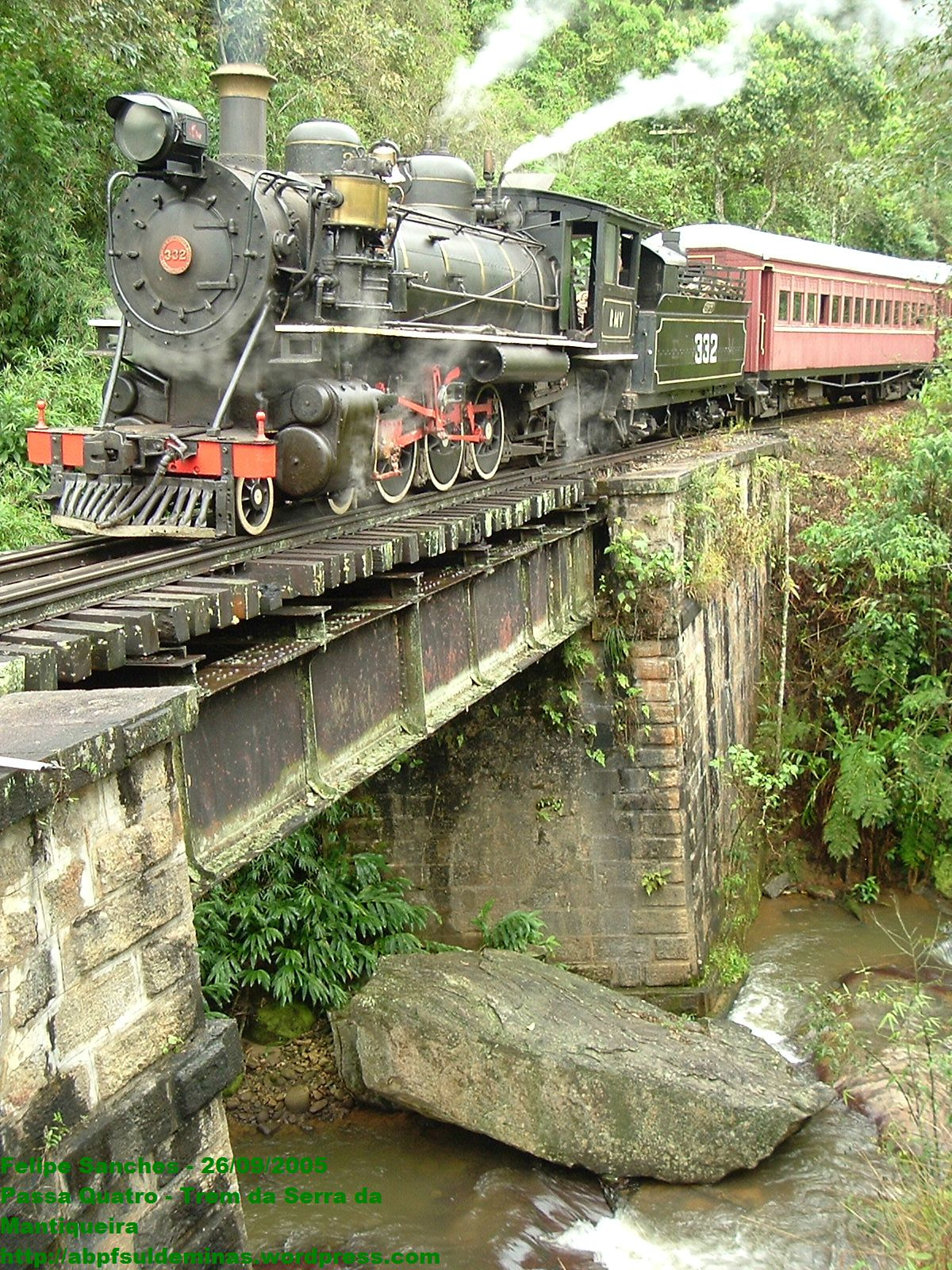
Serra da Mantiqueira (Mantiqueira Mountains) train going uphill from Passa Quatro to Tunnel, over Estrela Bridge. ABPF.

The Associação Brasileira de Preservação Ferroviária (ABPF) (Brazilian Association of Railway Preservation) is a non profit organization and was founded in 1977 by Frenchman Patrick Henri Ferdinand Dollinger, and brings together those interested in preserving and disseminating the history of Brazilian railroad. Fond of steam locomotives and railways, Patrick came to Brazil in 1966 and concerned with the abandonment of the Brazilian railway history, decided to create an entity preservation, similar to those existing in Europe and the United States.

In 1979 ABPF received from São Paulo state government the concession to use and operate a 24 km deactivated branch of Fepasa Railway in Campinas city. The society started the restoration of stations and tracks. Soon it started gathering rolling stock all around the country, that were borrowed by the government. This later became the Viação Ferrea Campinas Jaguariuna (Campinas Jaguariuna Railroad).

ABPF is split in several local chapters, known as regionals. The current chapters are:

- Regional de Campinas: responsible for the Viação Ferrea Campinas Jaguariuna
- Regional São Paulo: operates broad gauge steam train at São Paulo city and Paranapiacaba district
- Regional Rio de Janeiro: keeps a small museum and a model railroad.
- Regional Santa Catarina: operates steam trains at Rio Negrinho, Piratuba and Apiúna.
- Regional Paraná: currently restoring rolling stock at Curitiba and planning an operation.
- Regional Sul de Minas: operates three tourist train rides, one at Passa Quatro MG, one at São Lourenço MG and another at Guararema SP (another state), also keeps a steam locomotive repair shop at Cruzeiro SP

ABPF is the largest steam operator of heritage railways in Brazil.

== Gallery ==
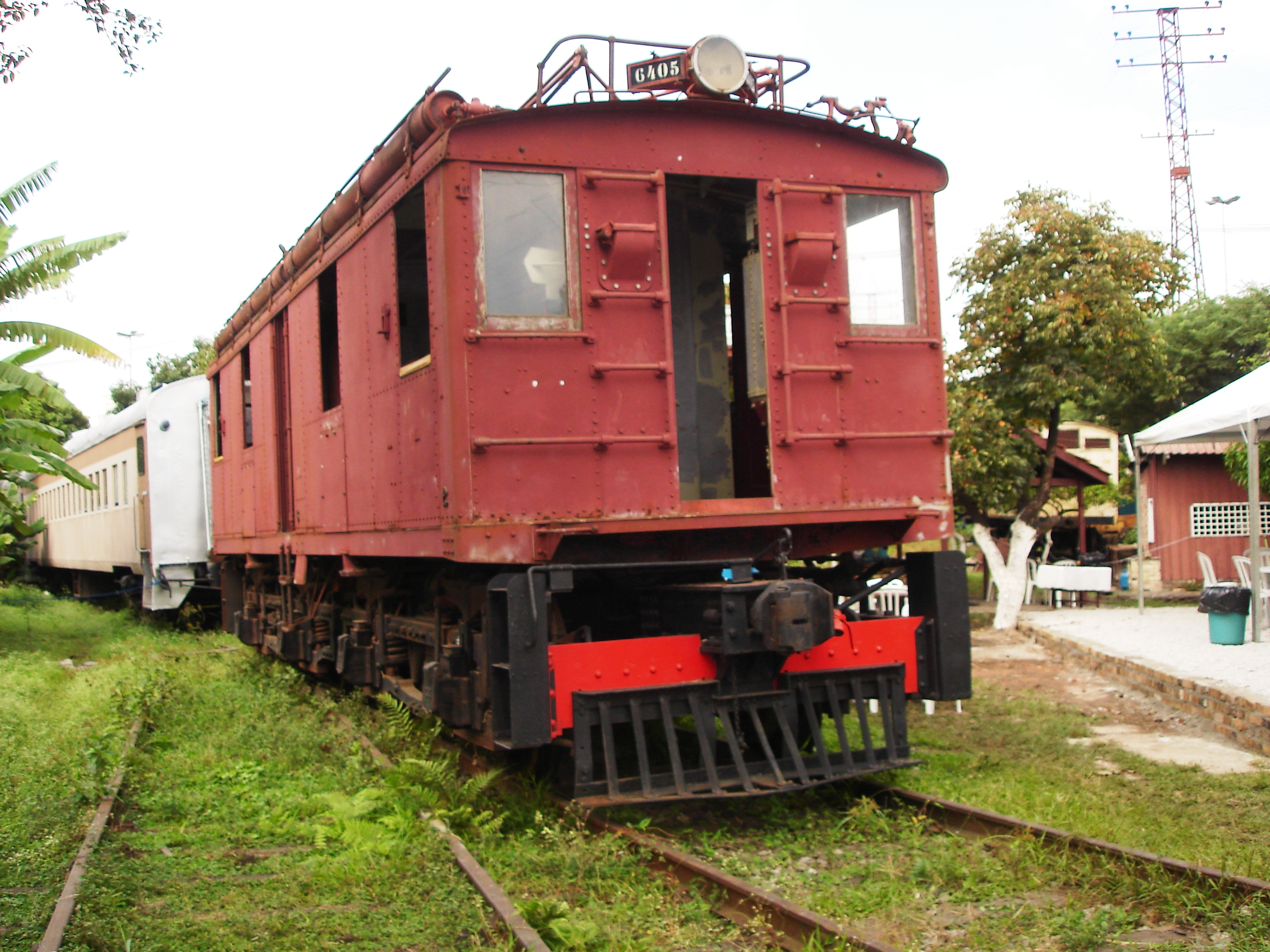
Electric locomotive built by GE in the U.S. in 1921, especially for transport of cargo. Belonged to Paulista Railway, originally #208, then #404. Operated in Fepasa (#6405) and today is part of the acquis of ABPF-SP. It is still preserved..

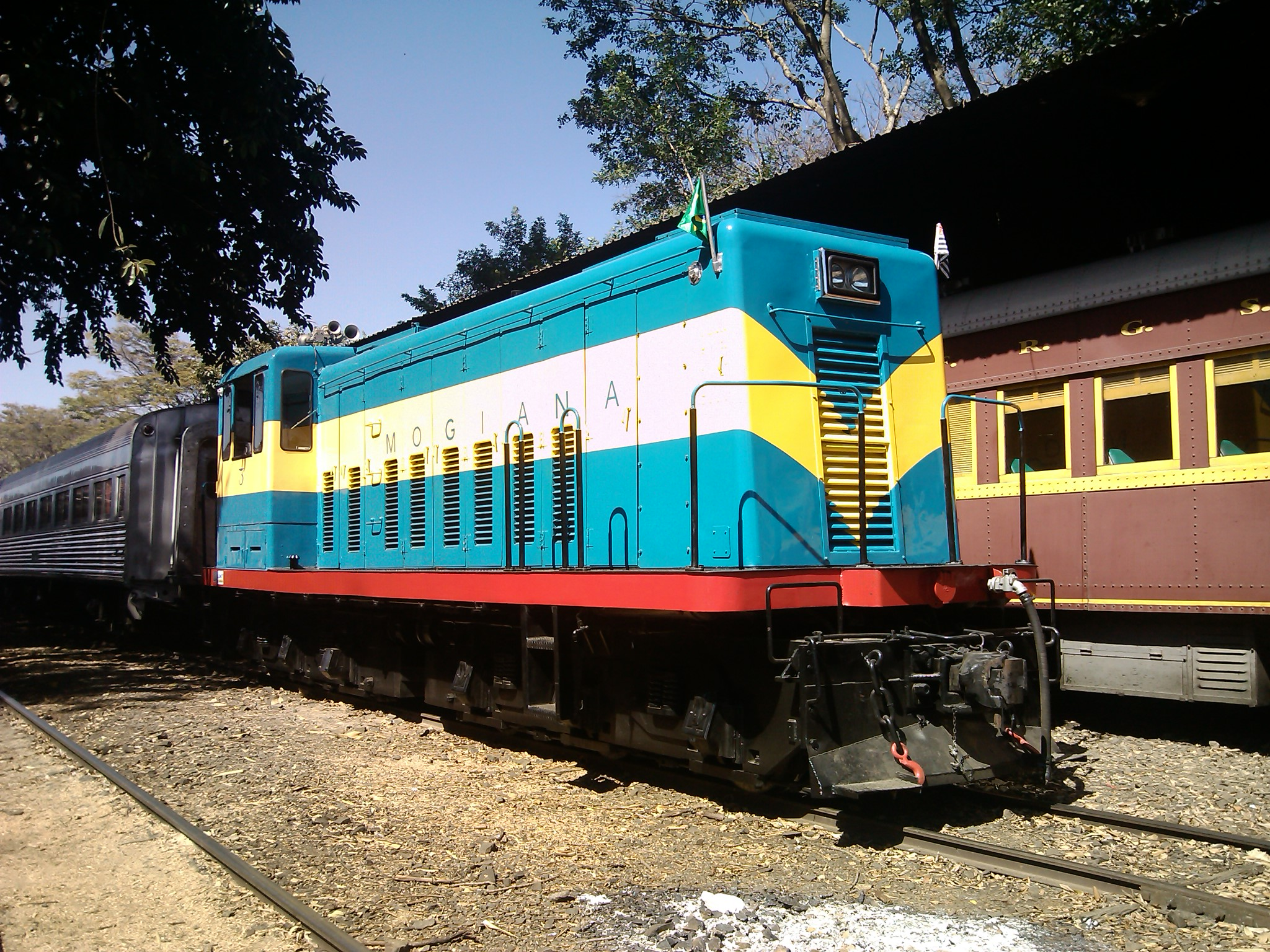
GE 70 ton (64 metric tons) switcher in 1000mm gauge. Photo taken at Anhumas station, Campinas - São Paulo state - Brazil

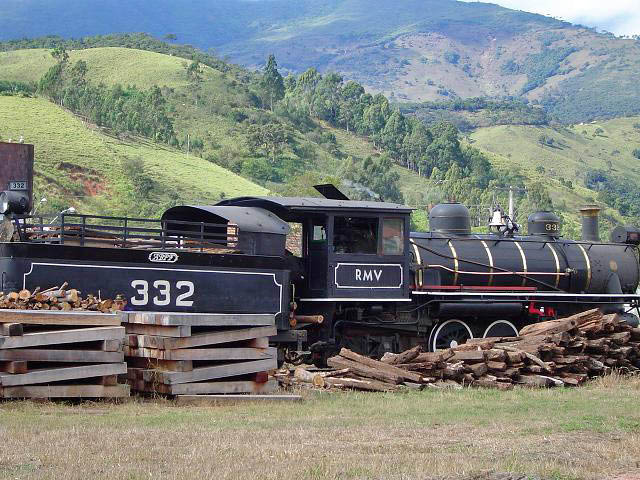
Steam locomotive ex-RMV, Passa Quatro, Minas Gerais States, Brazil.

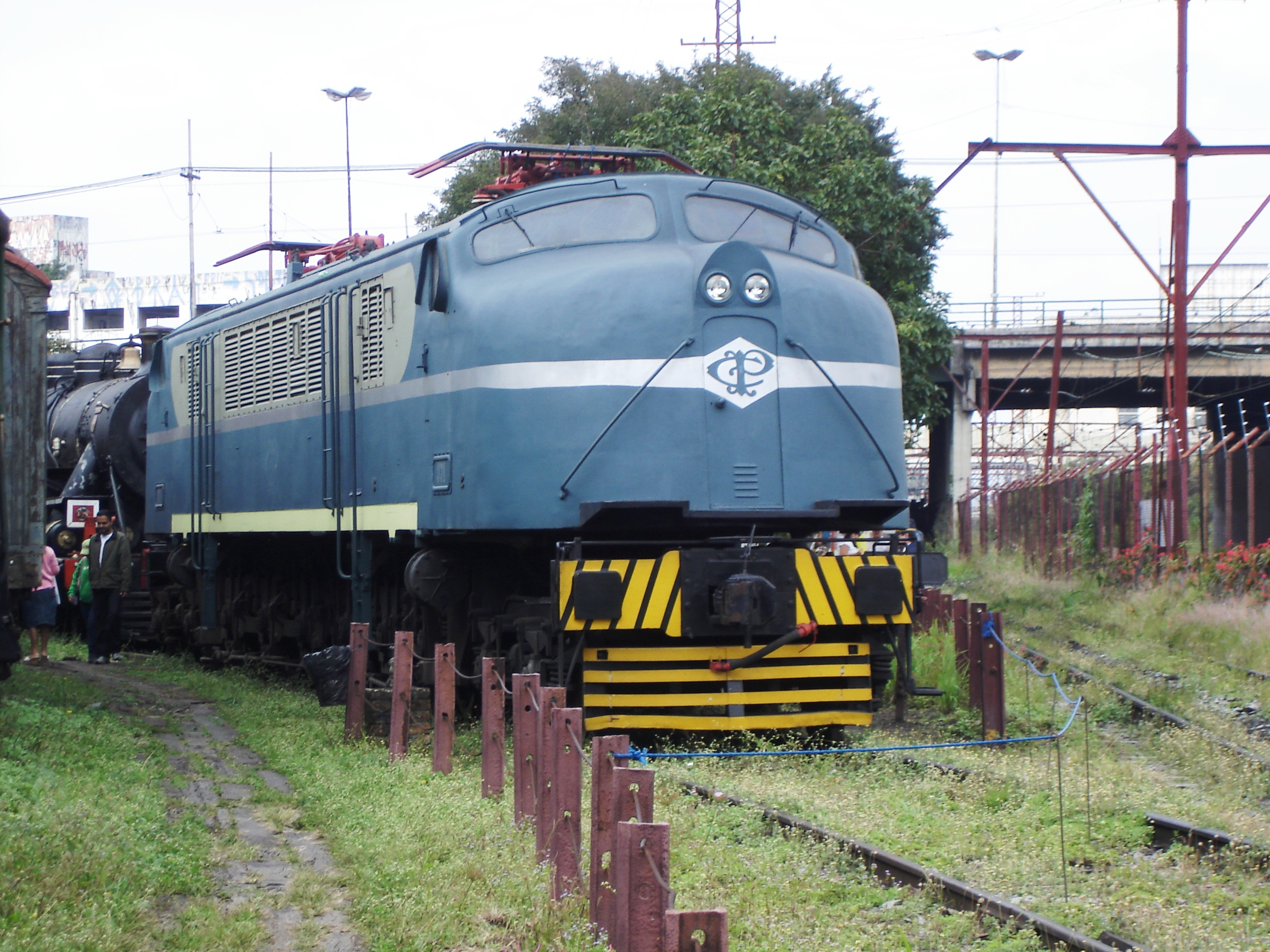
Electric locomotive built by GE in the U.S., originally for the Paulista Railroad, operated in Fepasa and today is part of the acquis of ABPF-SP.

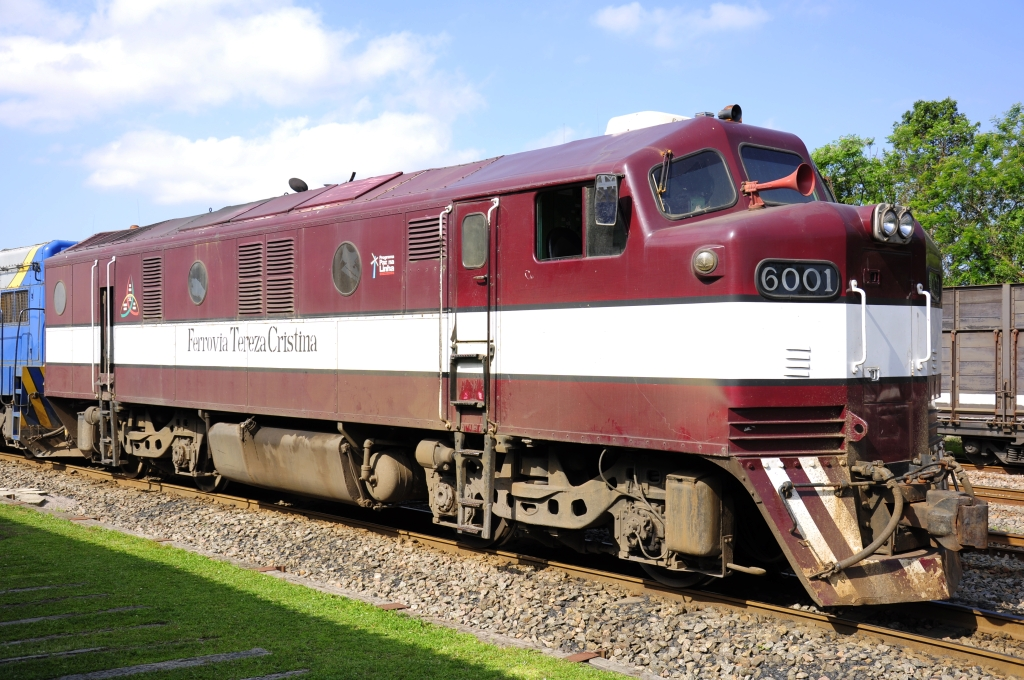
Diesel-Electric Locomotive GMD B12 B-B # 6001 - built by General Motors Diesel to EFVM in 1953 transferred to RFFSA in 1968, currently Ferrovia Tereza Cristina. Tubarão-SC-Brazil..

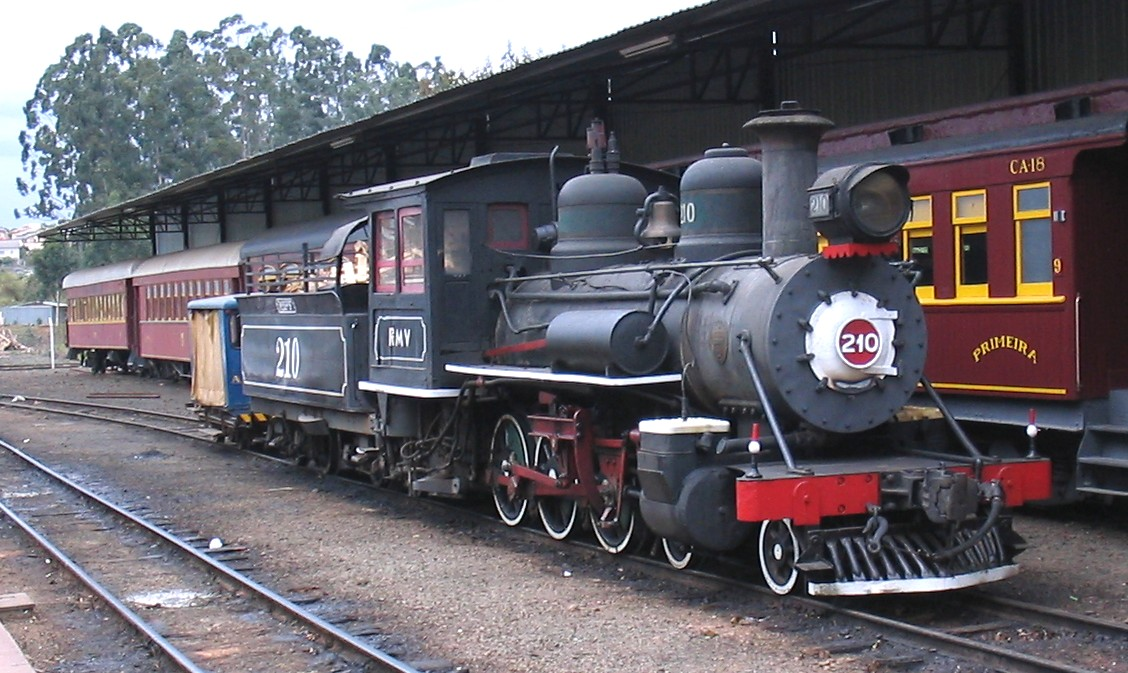
Steam locomotive of Campinas-SP to the Jaguariúna-SP. Anhumas station in Campinas-SP.
