= OAF =

OAF, Oaf or oaf may refer to:

- Associação Académica de Coimbra – O.A.F., a professional football team in Coimbra, Portugal
- ÖAF, an Austrian car and truck brand
- Oak Flats railway station in New South Wales, station code OAF
- Open Accessibility Framework, a high-level design for handicapped-accessible computer equipment and programs
- Oracle Application Framework, a software framework developed by Oracle Corporation for application development
- Oroantral fistula
- A term for changeling
- "The Oaf", debut single by rock band Big Wreck
- The main character in the comic book series Wuvable Oaf

== See also ==
- OFE (disambiguation)
