= Fuk =

Fuk may refer to:

- a Chinese character meaning "fortune" (福), also transliterated Fook, Fuku, or Fu
- FUK, IATA code of Fukuoka Airport in Japan
- a Chinese given name:
  - Fuk Li (Chinese: 李復國), physicist at NASA
- a misspelling, internet spelling, or phonetic spelling of the word fuck
- Fukuchilite, a copper iron sulfide mineral (IMA symbol)

== See also ==
- FUC (disambiguation)
- Fuck (disambiguation)
- Fuks (disambiguation)
