= Fok (surname) =

Fok is a surname. Notable people with the surname include:

- Alexander Fok (1843–1926), Imperial Russian general
- Anthony Fok, Singaporean teacher, businessman and private tutor
- Brian Fok (born 1994), Nigerian-born Hong Kong former footballer
- Canning Fok (born 1951), Hong Kong business executive
- Henry Fok (1923–2006), Hong Kong businessman
- Fok Hing-tong (1872–1957), Hong Kong businesswoman and social reformer
- Ian Fok (born 1949), Hong Kong politician, son of Henry Fok
- Joseph Fok (born 1962), Hong Kong judge and lawyer
- Katherine Fok (born 1941), former Hong Kong government official, Secretary for Health and Welfare from 1994 to 1999
- Kenneth Fok (born 1979), Hong Kong businessman and politician, grandson of Henry Fok and son of Timothy Fok
- Mable Fok, Chinese and American engineering professor
- Mei-Ching Fok, Chinese planetary scientist in the United States
- Fok Pui-yee (born 1950), former Hong Kong pro-democracy activist and politician
- Timothy Fok (1946), Hong Kong politician, son of Henry Fok
- Vladimir Fock (1898–1974), also spelled Fok, Soviet physicist
- Wouter Fok (born 1954), Dutch tennis player

== See also ==
- Huo, a Chinese surname pronounced Fok in Cantonese
- Fock, a surname
