= List of preserved GE Dash 7 locomotives =

This is a summary, listing every locomotive from General Electric (GE)'s Dash 7 line in preservation. All are listed by serial number.

== B23-7 ==
Works no.	Locomotive	Build date	Model	Former operators	Retire date	Disposition and location	Notes	References
41740	Providence and Worcester 2201	March 1978	B23-7	Providence and Worcester (PW)	2019	Stored at the Railroad Museum of New England in Thomaston, Connecticut		
42570	VLIX 3179	September 1979	B23-7	Conrail (CR); CSX Transportation (CSX); Vintage Locomotives, Inc. (VLIX)		Operational at the Southern Appalachia Railway Museum in Oak Ridge, Tennessee		

== B30-7 ==
Photograph	Works no.	Locomotive	Build date	Model	Former operators	Retire date	Disposition and location	Notes	References
	41873	Southern Pacific 7815	March 1978	B30-7	Southern Pacific Transportation Company (SP); Union Pacific Railroad (UP); Wimpey Materials Inc. (WIMX)	December 19, 2001	Owned by the Midwest Overland Rail Preservation Society in Perry, Oklahoma		
	42248	Southern Pacific 7863	April 1979	B30-7	Southern Pacific Transportation Company (SP); Union Pacific Railroad (UP)	January 29, 2001	Stored at Revolution Rail Company in South Fork, Colorado		
	42265	Union Pacific 7773	May 1979	B30-7	St. Louis Southwestern Railway (SSW); Southern Pacific Transportation Company (SP); Union Pacific Railroad (UP)	November 30, 2003	-		
	42777	Chesapeake and Ohio 8272	January 1980	B30-7	Chessie System (C&O); CSX Transportation (CSX)	2009	On static display at the Lake Shore Railway Museum in North East, Pennsylvania		

== B36-7 ==
=== Preserved B36-7 parts ===
Works no.	Locomotive	Build date	Model	Former operators	Retire date	Preserved part(s)	Location	Notes	References
44272	Conrail 5021	November 1983	B36-7	Conrail (CR); Norfolk Southern Railway (NS)	January 2002	Front number board and headlight	Private owner		

== C30-7 ==
Photograph	Works no.	Locomotive	Build date	Model	Former operators	Retire date	Disposition and location	Notes	References
	43064	Louisville and Nashville 7067	August 1980	C30-7	Louisville and Nashville Railroad (L&N); Seaboard System Railroad (SBD); CSX Transportation (CSX)	1999	Operational, under ownership of Kentucky Steam Heritage Corporation in Irvine, Kentucky		
	2501331	Rumo Logística 7202	December 1990	C30-7A	Cutrale-Quintela (CQ); FEPASA; Ferroban; Brasil Ferrovias (BF); América Latina Logística (ALL); Rumo Logística (RUMO)	2017	Operational at the Brazilian Association for Railway Preservation (ABPF) at São Paulo, Brazil		

== C36-7 ==
Photograph	Works no.	Locomotive	Build date	Model	Former operators	Retire date	Disposition and location	Notes	References
	78-053	América Latina Logística 9380	February 1978	C36-7	Hamersley Iron (HI); National Railway Equipment Company (NREX); Brasil Ferrovias (BF); América Latina Logística (ALL)	1997	Operational at the Brazilian Association for Railway Preservation (ABPF) at São Paulo, Brazil	Built by Goninan NSW in Australia, designated as the model C36-7	
	44604	China Railway ND5.0016	1984	C36-7	China Railway	-	Displayed at the Shenyang Railway Museum in Shenyang, China		
	44637	China Railway ND5.0049	1984	C36-7	China Railway	-	Displayed at the China Railway Museum in Beijing, China		
	45301	China Railway ND5.0422	January 1986	C36-7	China Railway	-	Displayed at the China Railway Museum in Beijing, China		

== Formerly preserved, scrapped ==
=== C30-7 ===
Photograph	Works no.	Locomotive	Build date	Model	Former operators	Retire date	Last seen	Scrap date	Cause of scrapping	Notes	References
	43697	New Hope and Ivyland Railroad 7087	November 1981	C30-7	Seaboard Coast Line Railroad (SCL); Seaboard System Railroad (SBD); CSX Transportation (CSX); New Hope and Ivyland Railroad (NHRR)	2019 (NHRR)	New Hope and Ivyland Railroad (NHRR) at Hatfield, Pennsylvania	November 2021	Broken turbocharger that totaled the locomotive		

== See also ==
- List of preserved GE locomotives
