= 0F =

0F (zero F) may refer to:

- Zero degrees Fahrenheit, which is -18°C
- Caledonian Railway 0F Class
- LMS Kitson Class 0F, a classification of LMS Kitson 0-4-0ST

== See also ==
- F0 (disambiguation)
- OF (disambiguation)
