= Fokker (disambiguation) =

Fokker was a Dutch aircraft manufacturer founded in 1912 by Dutch aviation pioneer Anthony Fokker.

Fokker may also refer to:

- Fokker I, a human-powered aircraft built by brothers Jan and Cor Fokker in the early 1930s
- Fokker Rocks in Antarctica, named so because a Fokker airplane was damaged and abandoned there in 1928
- Fokker Technologies, Dutch aerospace company founded in 2011; named for Anthony Fokker
- VFW-Fokker, company involved in rocket and spacelab development; named for Anthony Fokker

== People with the surname ==
- Adriaan Fokker (1887–1972), Dutch physicist and musician
- Anthony Fokker (1890–1939), Dutch aviation pioneer and an aircraft manufacturer
- Hans Fokker (1900–1943), Dutch Olympic sailor
- Herman Fokker (1921–2001), Dutch engineer and politician
- Jan Piet Fokker (1942–2010), Dutch Olympic field hockey player

== See also ==
- Focker (disambiguation)
