= F0 =

F0 or F00 may refer to:

- HMS Jervis (F00), a 1938 British Royal Navy J-class destroyer
- F-Zero, a futuristic racing video game series
- Fate/Zero, a novel series
- F00, Dementia in Alzheimer's disease ICD-10 code
- F_{0}, Fundamental frequency
- BYD F0, a car manufactured by BYD Auto
- The lowest tornado intensity on the Fujita scale

== See also ==
- Foo, a metasyntactic variable
- FO (disambiguation), or Fo
- 0F (disambiguation)
