= FOK =

Fok or FOK may refer to:

== People ==
- Fok (surname), a list of people with the name

== FOK ==
- FOK!, a Dutch website
- Prague Symphony Orchestra, a Czech orchestra known by the acronym FOK (Film-Opera-Koncert)
- Feeling of knowing
- Fill or kill, an order to buy or sell a stock immediately
- FOK, IATA airport code and FAA location ID for Francis S. Gabreski Airport, Long Island, New York, United States
- Fagiano Okayama, a Japanese association football team

== See also ==
- Huo, a Chinese surname pronounced Fok in Cantonese
