= Evangelical Free Church of China =

Chinese Protestant denomination

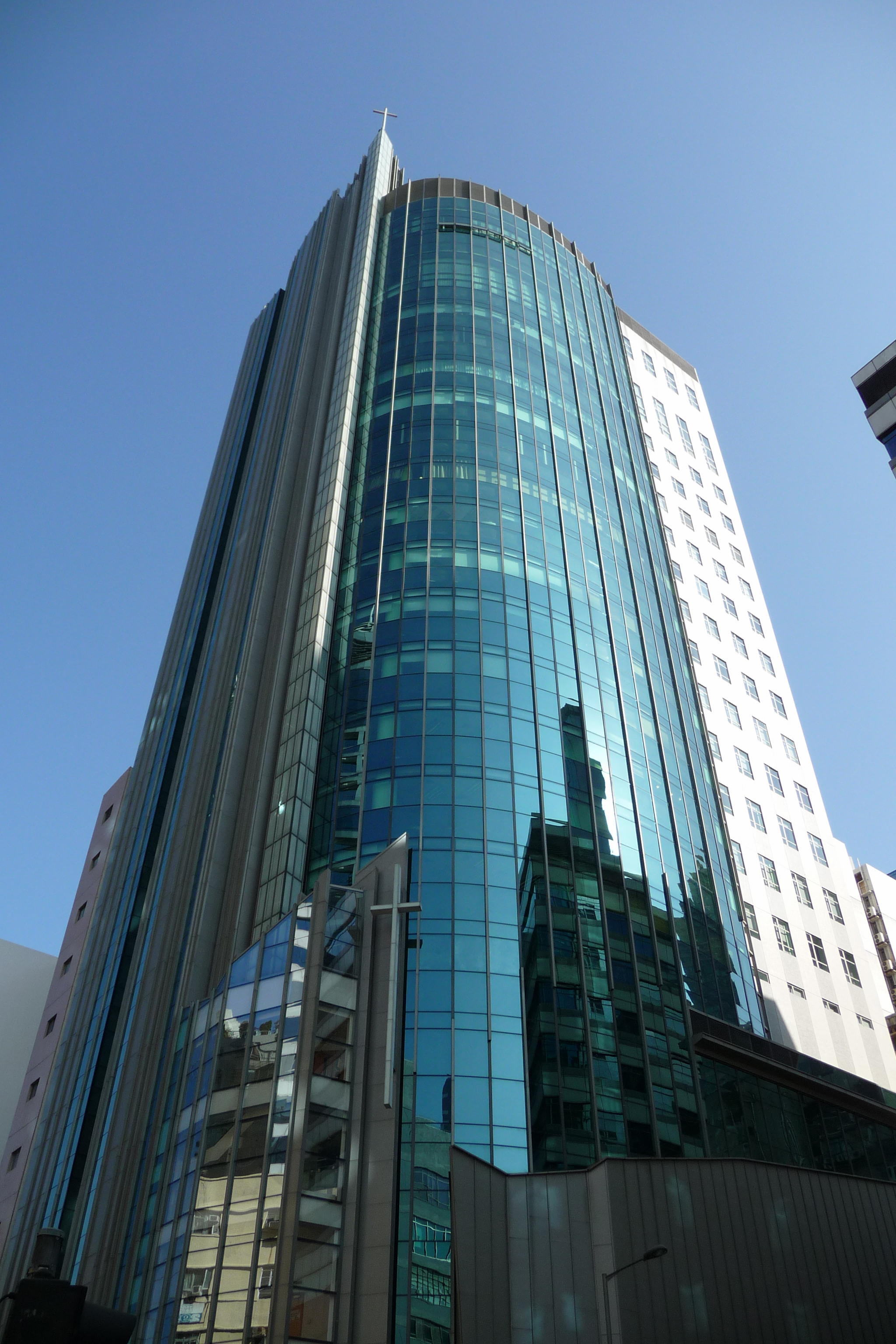
Yan Fook Church is the largest church of EFCC

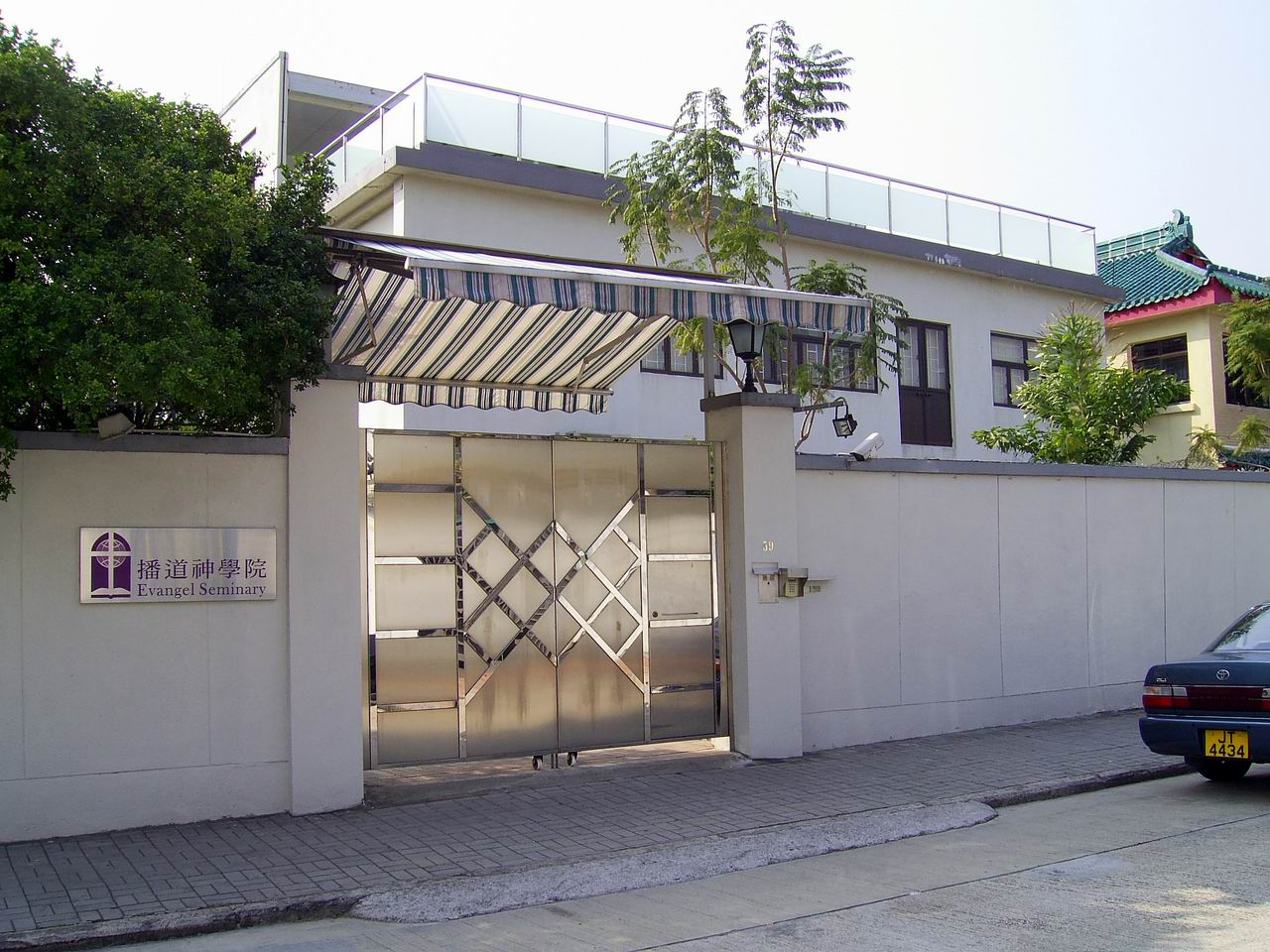
Evangel Seminary

Evangelical Free Church of China (EFCC) is a Chinese Protestant denomination historically based in mainland China and Hong Kong. It is today one of the largest evangelical denominations in Hong Kong.

== History ==
In 1887, the Swedish American Hans J. von Qualen of the Evangelical Free Church of America became the denomination's first missionary to China. After a short period of language study in Canton, von Qualen established the mission's first chapel in 1888 outside the city of Canton in Henan province as a base for evangelism. By 1925, as the mission developed and had 28 Chinese and Western Christian workers, the mission developed Bible classes which would eventually lead to the establishment of the Canton Bible Institute in 1927, later known as the Evangel Seminary.

It established its first church, Tin Chuen Church, in Hong Kong in 1937. In 1949, a large number of missionaries relocated themselves, along with the Evangel Seminary, south to Hong Kong when there was a change in Chinese political scenery. At the same time, the EFCC Headquarters was also moved to Hong Kong to continue the implementation of its goal.

== Doctrine ==
According to the Holy Bible, EFCC sticks to these seven basic doctrine.

- Believe in one true God, Creator of all things and Lord of the universe, eternally existing in three person, Father, Son and Holy Spirit.
- Believe that Jesus Christ is the Son of God, being true God and true man, having been conceived of the Holy spirit and born of the Virgin Mary. He died on the cross for the atonement of man's iniquities, so that man may be delivered from the condemnation and power of sin. Further, He arose from dead, ascended into heaven, where at the right hand of the Father He now is the Advocate and High Priest interceding for the saints. He is also the Head of the Church, and will come visibly again from heaven to establish His kingdom and to judge the living and the dead.
- Believe that the Holy Spirit is the third person of the Trinity, who descended on the day of Pentecost to glorify Christ, convict sinners, grant new birth, and to indwell and empower the believers for victories and holy living, and to unite them into one body, the Church of Christ.
- Believe that man was created in the image of God but became spiritually dead because of disobedience to God. Since Adam our fore-father sinned, all have become sinners, living under the wrath of God. Only through sincere repentance and acceptance of Christ's redemption, cleansing by His blood and regeneration by the Holy Spirit can one enter the Kingdom of God.
- Believe in the Scriptures, both Old and New Testaments, to be the inspired Word of God, the living Word of life, wholly truthful and trustworthy, and the final authority for all Christian faith and life.
- Believe that all men will be resurrected, the believers to eternal life and heavenly blessings and the unbelievers to eternal death in hell.
- Believe that Satan is the Devil, the source of all evils. He is working in the hearts of disobedient men, and will one day receive eternal punishment.

== Organisation ==
- Evangel Seminary
- Evangel Children's Home
- Evangel Hospital
- Evangelical Free Church of China Hong Kong Overseas missions board
- Evangel College
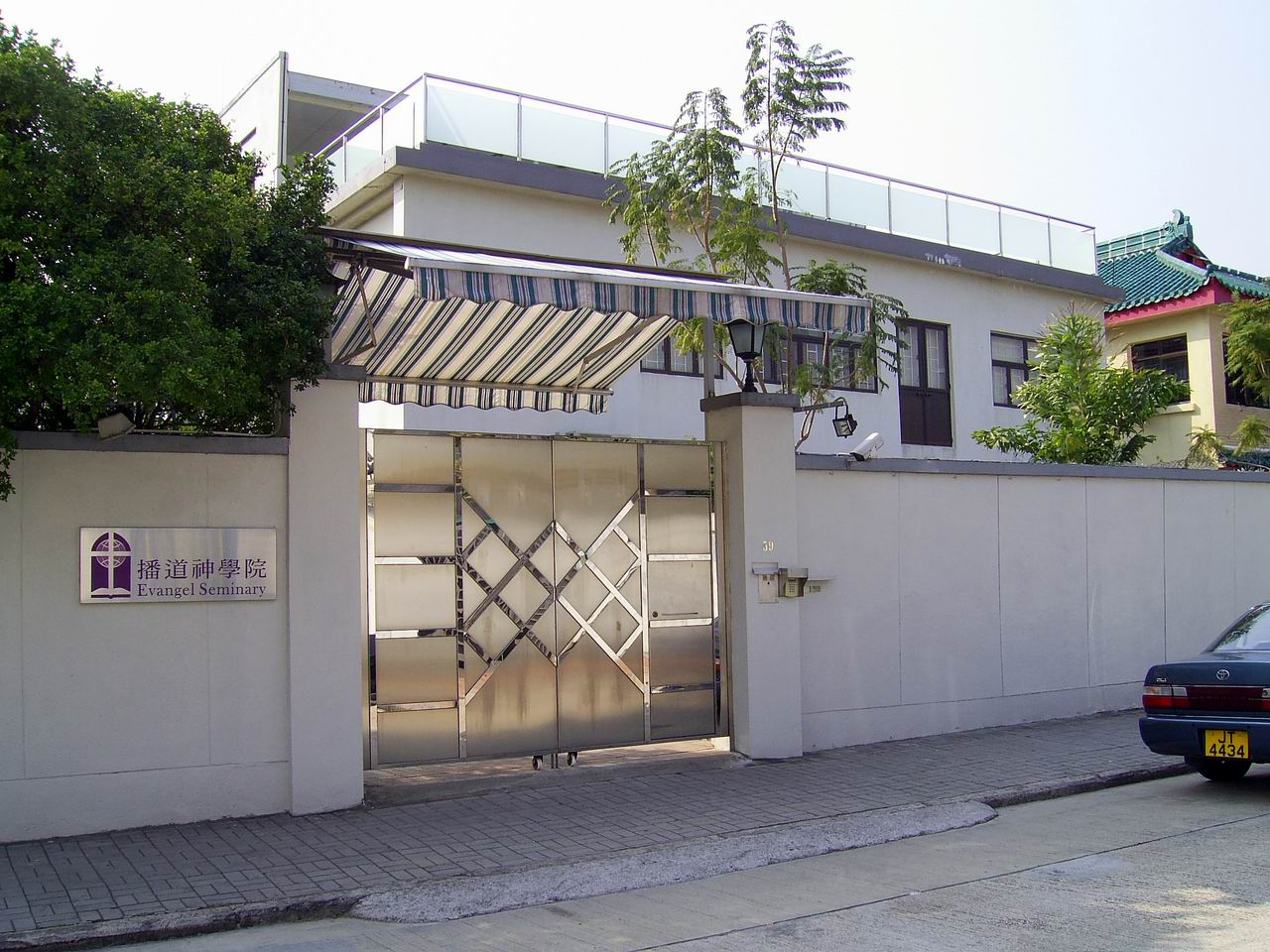
Evangel Seminary

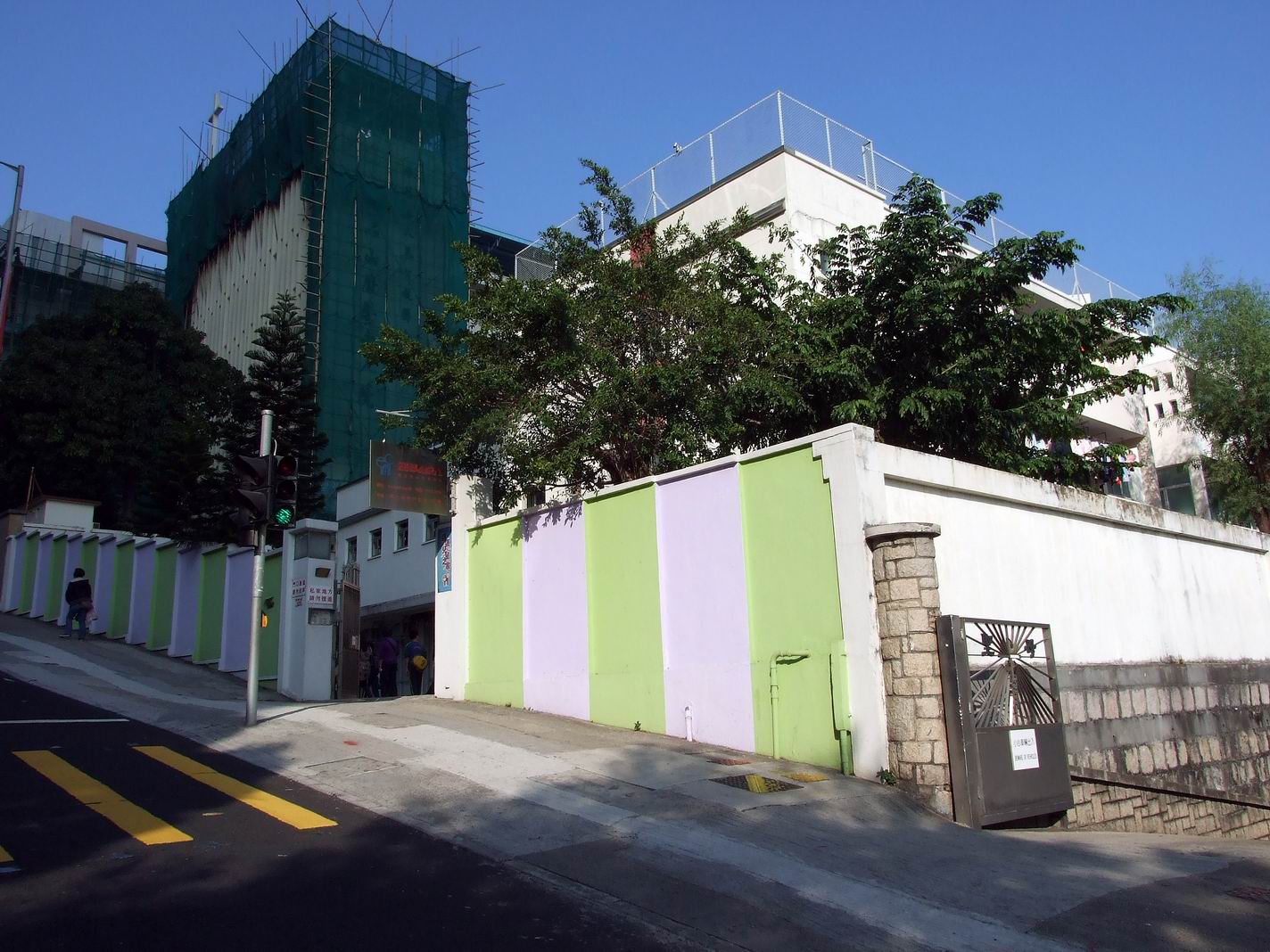
Evangel Children's Home

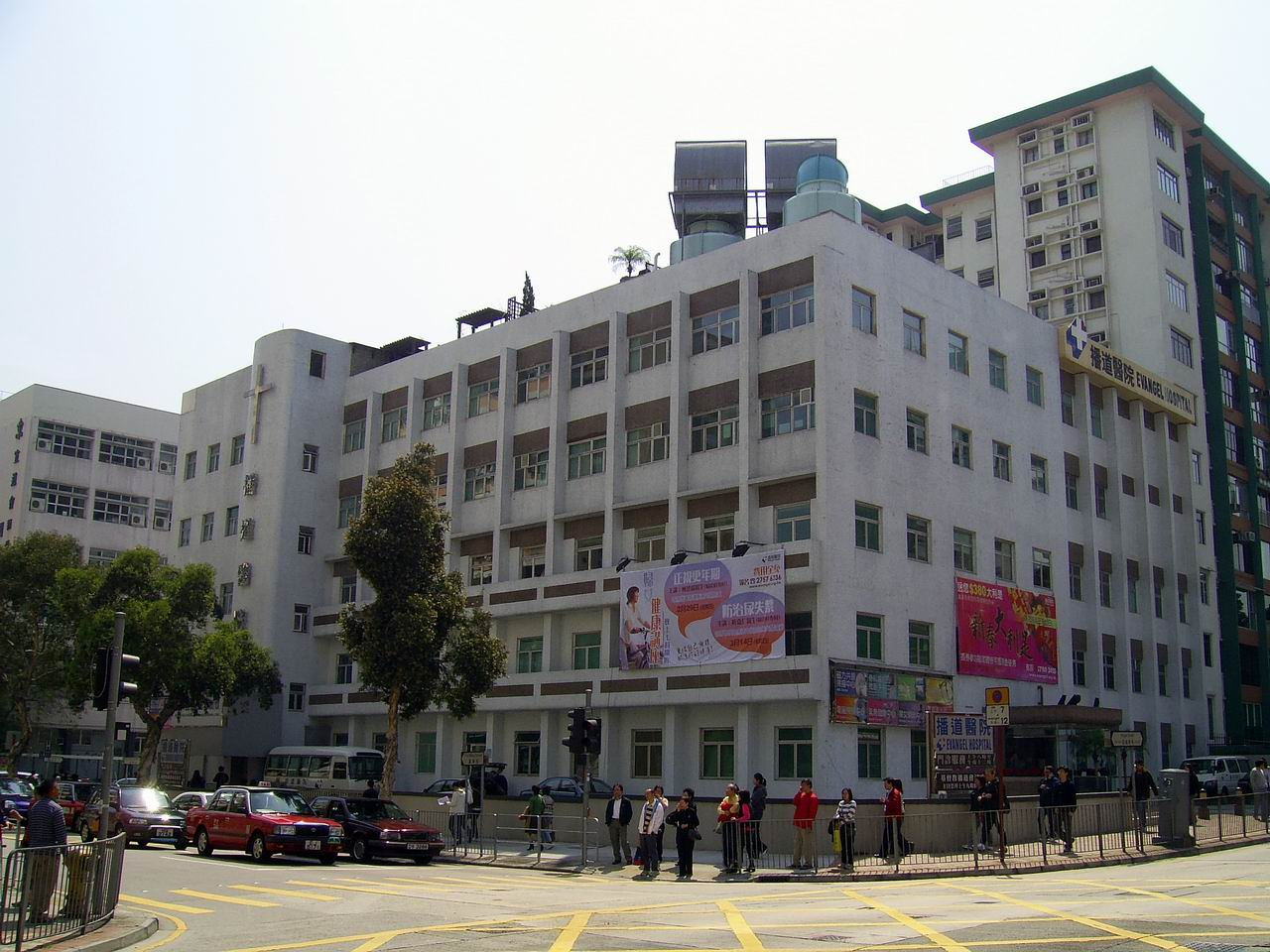
Evangel Hospital

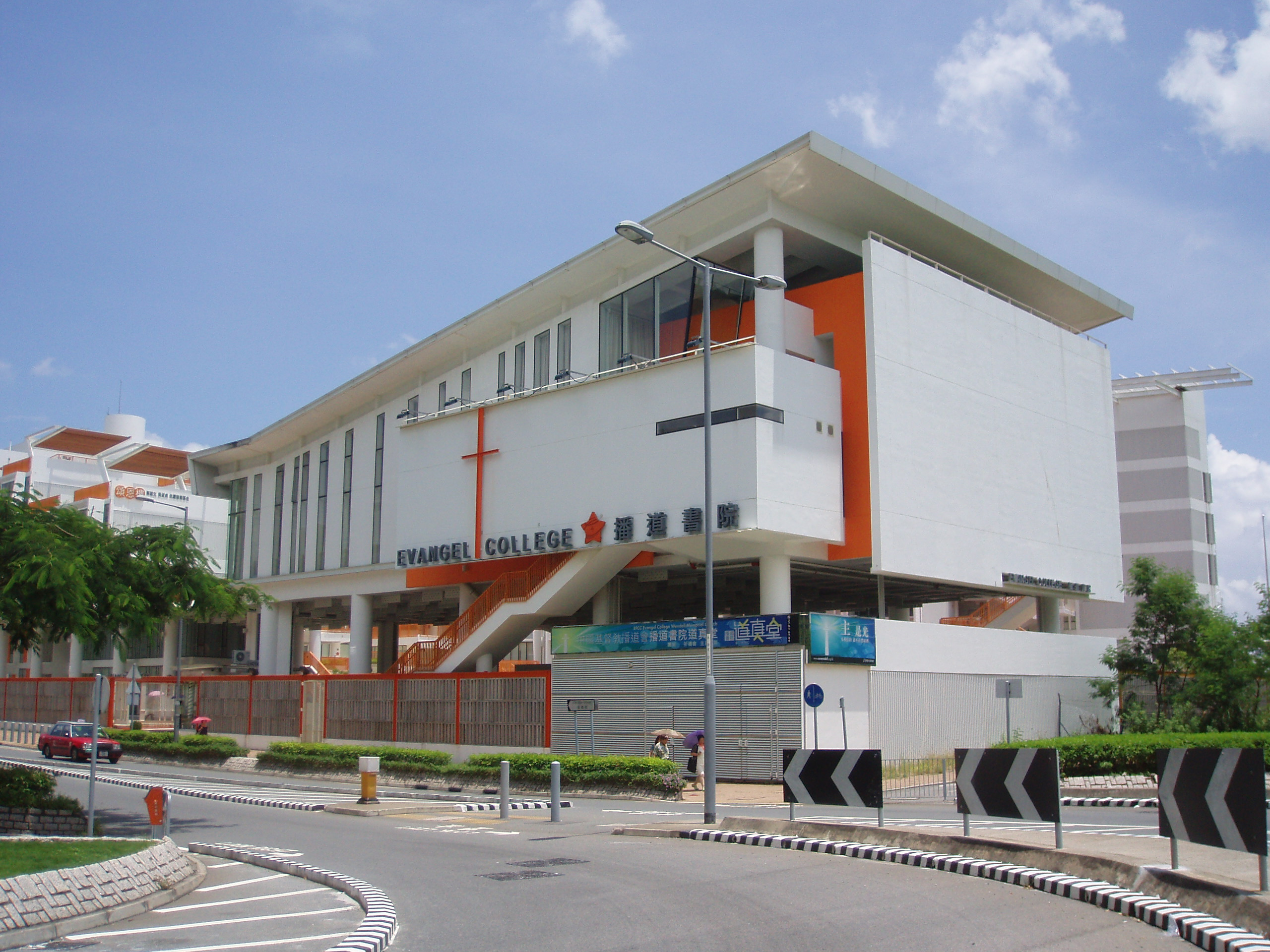
Evangel College

== Social service ==
- Elderly centre
- Society and family service
- Kindergarten
- Study room and education centre

== Churches ==
There are 52 churches in Hong Kong Island, Kowloon, The New Territories and Islands District recently. The following churches are listed in the year founded.

=== Hong Kong Island ===
- 5 Ling Chuen Church
- 11 Christ Church
- 18 Taikoo Shing Church
- 20 Kong Fok Church
- 28 Kornhill Community Church
- 31 Tung Fook Church
- 32 International Church
- 42 Ling Fook Church
- 50 Aldrich Bay Church

=== Kowloon ===
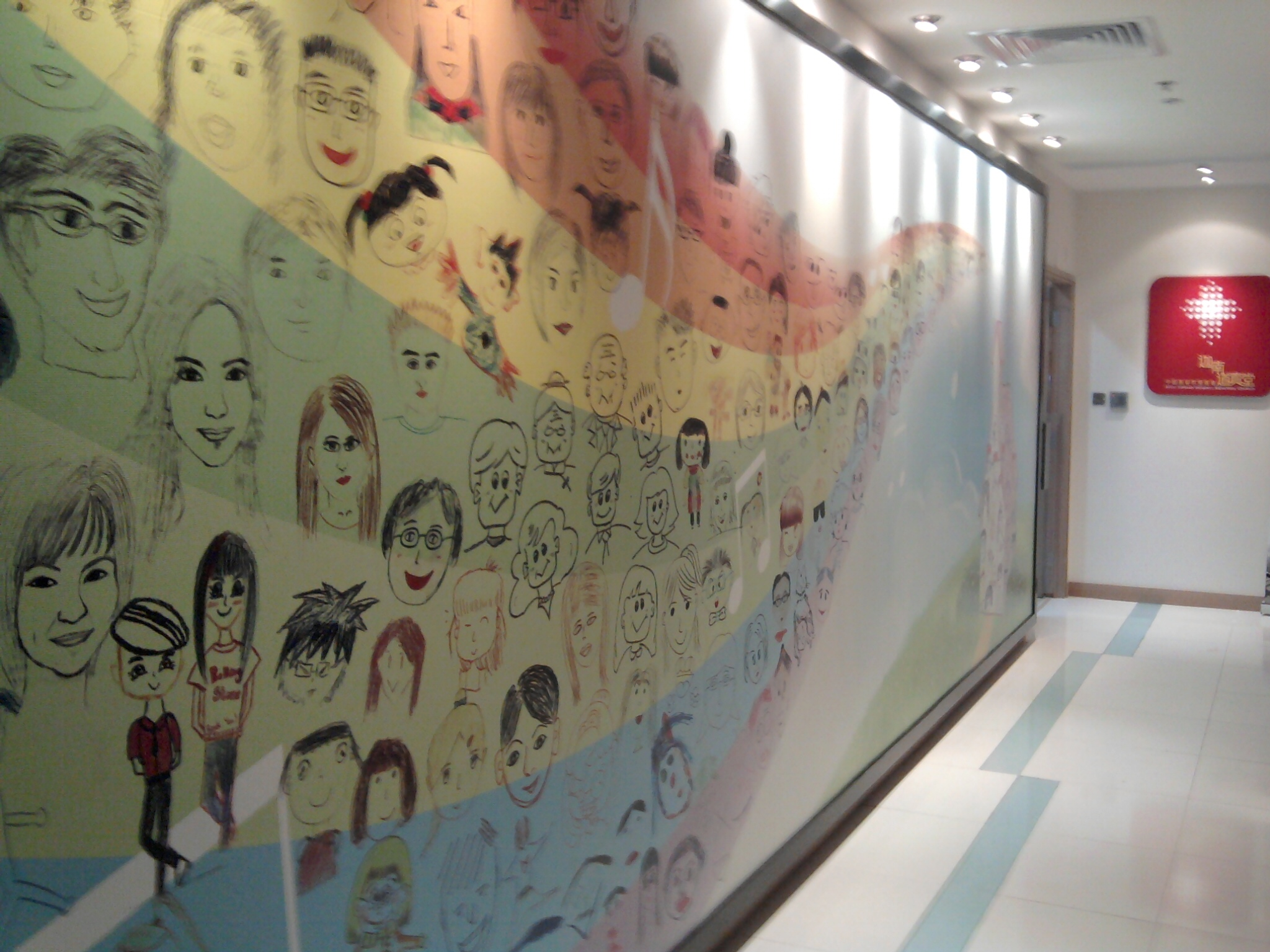
Canaan Wendell Memorial Church

- 1 Tin Chuen Church
- 2 Grace Church
- 3 Wendell Memorial Church
- 4 Woot Chuen Church
- 6 Fook Chuen Church
- 7 Elim Church
- 8 Canaan Wendell Memorial Church
- 9 Kwun Tong Church
- 10 Waterloo Hill Church
- 12 Joy Church
- 14 San Po Kong Church
- 17 Choi Fook Church
- 21 Shun On Church
- 23 Wo Ping Church
- 24 Glorious Grace Church
- 25 Yan Fook Church
- 27 Hing Tin Wendell Memorial Church
- 30 Woot Kei Church
- 34 Tsim Fook Church
- 38 Woot Oi Church
- 40 Lam Tin Church
- 43 Amazing Grace Church
- 49 Lok Yan Church
- 52 Mong Fook Church
- 54 Spring Church
- 55 Yan Fook Church (Kowloon East)

=== The New Territories ===
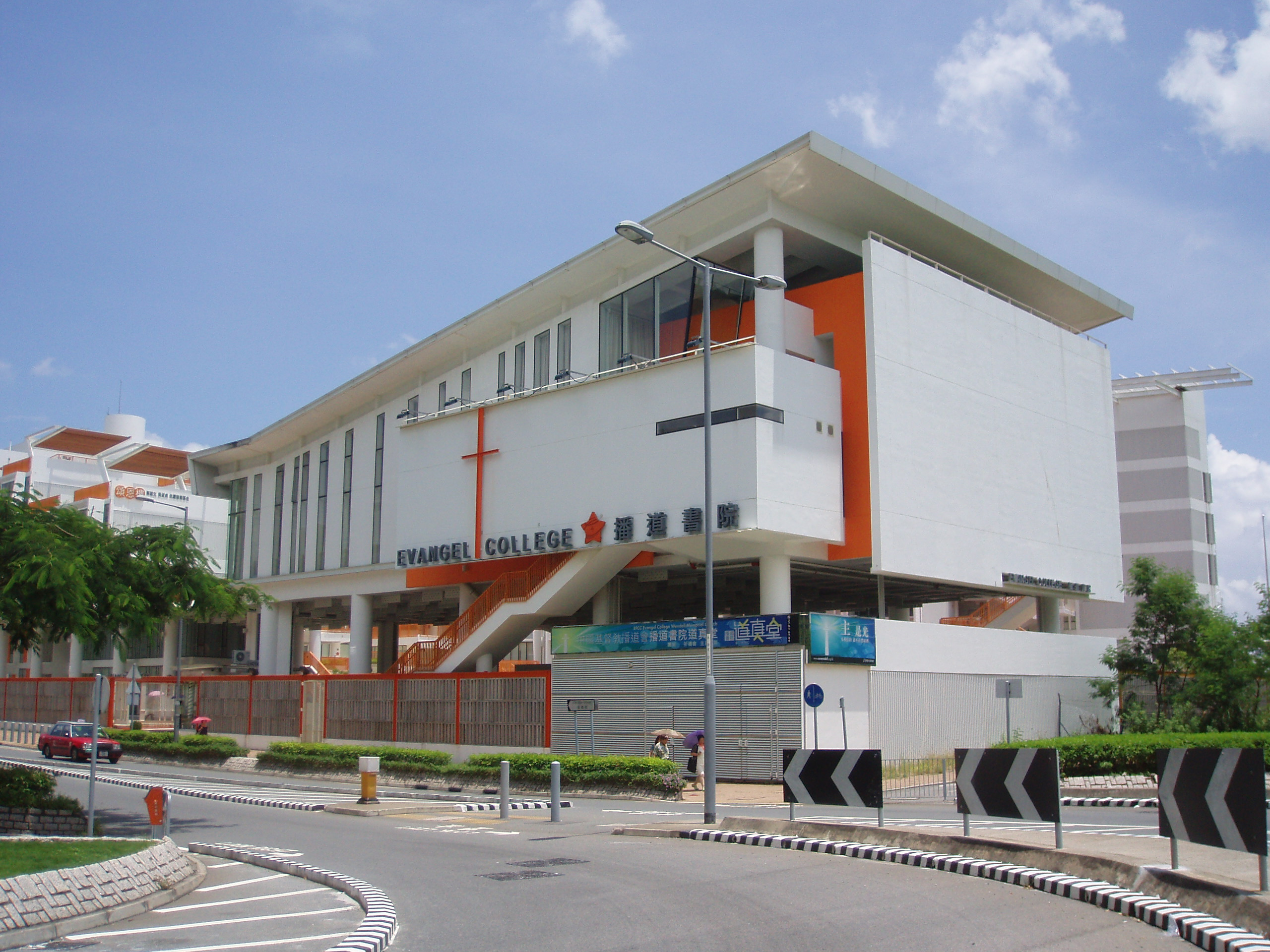
Evangel College Wendell Memorial Church

- 13 Tuen Mun Church
- 15 King Fook Church
- 16 Hong Fook Church
- 19 Faith Church
- 22 Shan Fook Church
- 26 Fook On Church
- 29 Po Nga Church
- 36 Tin Fook Church
- 39 Abundant Grace Church
- 41 Tin Yan Church
- 44 Verbena Height Church
- 45 Tuen Yan Church
- 46 Discovery Bay International Community Church
- 47 The Fountain of Love Church
- 48 Fook Yat Church
- 51 Evangel College Wendell Memorial Church
- 53 On Fook Church

== See also ==
- Evangelical Free Church of America
