= Fuck me =

Fuck me is a form of the profanity "fuck". It may also refer to:

- slang for requesting another to have sexual intercourse with the requestor
- interjection when having pressure or stress applied to a degree that is unrecoverable
- fuck-me shoes, a type of footwear suggesting a desire to have sex
- Baise-moi, a 2000 French thriller film
- "Love Me" (Stooshe song) (originally titled "Fuck Me"), 2013
- "Fuck Me (Interlude)", a song by The Notorious B.I.G. from Ready to Die, 1994
- "F*Me", a song by Shygirl and Yseult from Club Shy Room 2, 2025

== See also ==
- Screwed (disambiguation)
- Fuck (disambiguation)
- Fuck Me I'm Famous, series of electronic dance music compilation albums by the French DJ David Guetta in collaboration with his wife Cathy Guetta
- "Fuck Me, Ray Bradbury", a song by Rachel Bloom
- "If U Seek Amy" a Britney Spears song whose title references this phrase
