= Reinhardt Adolfo Fuck =

Brazilian geologist and professor

- Born: 3 April 1940 (age 86)
- Occupation: Professor Emeritus at the University of Brasília
- Known for: Geochronology; Petrology and Lithogeochemistry; High grade terrains Greenstone belt terrains Proterozoic folded belts
- Awards: National Order of Scientific Merit

Academic background
- Education: University of São Paulo

Academic work
- Discipline: Geology
- Institutions: University of Brasília

Reinhardt Adolfo Fuck (/ˈfʊk/, rhyming with "hook"; born 3 April 1940) is a Brazilian geologist and professor emeritus at the University of Brasília. Fuck specializes on geochronology and petrology, having written extensively on Precambrian geology.

== Biography ==
Born in April 1940 in Linha Serraria, Piratuba, Santa Catarina, he pursued his early education in remote villages in Santa Catarina and Rio Grande do Sul, following his father, a schoolteacher and occasional accountant. After completing secondary studies in Panambi and Ijuí, he attended the School of Geology at the University of Rio Grande do Sul, where he began his research. Graduating as a geologist in 1963, he was employed by the Government of Ceará for geological surveys and groundwater well exploration. This later led to him meeting his future wife, Isaurinha.

In August 1964, he joined the Paraná Geological Chart Commission, a collaboration between the State Government and the Federal University of Paraná. Working alongside many other geologists he participated in the systematic survey of eastern Paraná. The data collected contributed to numerous publications that advanced the understanding of Paraná's Precambrian and Palaeozoic geology.

In 1969 he graduated from the Escola de Geologia de Porto Alegre (UFRGS) in Brazil. In 1973 he got his doctorate in the University of São Paulo in Brazil. In 1975 he carried out postdoctoral research in geology and petrology in the Department of Geological Sciences at the University of Durham in England. His research lines are geochronology, petrology and lithogeochemistry, high-grade metamorphism, greenstone belts, Proterozoic double belts. He is an author of a large number of Precambrian-geology-related scientific papers.

In 2010, he was awarded the Brazilian honour called the National Order of Scientific Merit.
