= Fook =

Fook or FOOK may refer to:

== People with Fook as part of the given name ==
- Charles Chong, also known for his Chinese language name Chong You Fook (born 1953), Singaporean Member of Parliament
- Choong Tan Fook (born 1976), male badminton player from Malaysia
- Liang Wern Fook (born 1964), Singaporean writer, musician, and researcher in Chinese literature and pedagogy
- Loke Siew Fook, Malaysian politician and Member of Parliament
- Wong Ah Fook

== People with surname Fook ==
- Omar Lye-Fook (born 1968), British soul singer, songwriter and musician

== Other uses ==
- Fook (album), 1992 album by Pigface
- Fu character (pronounced "fook", in Cantonese), the Chinese character Fú 福 meaning "good fortune" or "happiness"
- Makokou Airport, Gabon, ICAO code FOOK

== See also ==
- King Fook Holdings, holding company engaging in jewellery retailing and wholesaling operations in Hong Kong
- Po Leung Kuk Mrs. Ma Kam Ming-Cheung Fook Sien College, full-time Grammar School in Tung Chung, Lantau, Hong Kong
- Tung Fook Church, Christian church based in Hong Kong
- Lunkwill and Fook, minor characters in The Hitchhiker's Guide to the Galaxy
- Chow Tai Fook Centre (disambiguation)
- Chow Tai Fook Enterprises, Hong Kong–based company
- Lukfook, a jewellery store chain of Hong Kong
- Chung Fook v. White 264 U.S. 443 (1924), important U.S. Supreme Court case
- Fook Lam Moon, Chinese restaurant chain with its, original branch at 35-45 Johnston Road, Wanchai, Hong Kong
- Jalan Wong Ah Fook, major one-way road in Johor Bahru, Johor, Malaysia
