= Fuks =

Fuks may refer to:

- Fuks (surname)
- Fuks 1 and Fuks 2, two mass graves from World War II in Pameče, Slovenia
- Fuks (1999) and Fuks 2 (2024), Polish comedy movies directed by Maciej Dutkiewicz

== See also ==
- Fusk, a village in Iran
- Fuchs (disambiguation) and Fux
