= Face Off =

Face Off may refer to:

== Film and television ==
- Face-Off (1971 film), a Canadian hockey romance film
- Face/Off, a 1997 American action film
  - Invertigo (roller coaster), a ride in Ohio, formerly known as Face/Off, after the film
- Face Off (American TV series), an American special effects makeup reality competition series
- Face Off (Singaporean talk show), a Singaporean talk show
- "Face Off" (Breaking Bad), a television episode
- "Face-Off" (Gilmore Girls), a television episode
- "Face Off" (Grimm), a television episode
- "Face Off", the penultimate episode of the fifteenth season of Criminal Minds

== Music ==
- Face Off (Bow Wow and Omarion album) or the title song, 2007
- Face Off (Pastor Troy album) or the title song, 2001
- Face Off, a mixtape by Brianna Perry, 2011
- "Face Off", a song by DJ Kay Slay from The Streetsweeper, Vol. 2, 2004
- "Face Off", a song by Jay-Z from In My Lifetime, Vol. 1, 1997
- "Face Off", a song by Reks from Rhythmatic Eternal King Supreme, 2011
- "Face Off" (Tech N9ne song), 2021
- Face-Off (Jimin song), 2023

== Sports ==
- Face-off, an event that starts play in stick sports such as hockey, bandy, and lacrosse
- Face-Off Classic, an annual American college lacrosse event in Baltimore, Maryland

== Video games ==
- Face Off (video game), a Japan-only 1988 arcade game by Namco
- Face Off!, a 1989 video game by Mindspan
