= Fuck It =

Fuck It may refer to:

- "Fuck It (I Don't Want You Back)", a song by American pop/R&B singer Eamon
- Fuck It, We'll Do It Live, a live album by American horror punk musician Wednesday 13
- "Fuck It", a song by Seether from Disclaimer II
- "Fuck It", a song by Dune Rats
- "Fxxk It", a song by South Korean boy band Big Bang from Made
- An exclamation using the word "fuck"

== See also ==
- Fuck off (disambiguation)
- Fuck you (disambiguation)
- We'll do it live (disambiguation)
- Phuket
