= Evangel Hospital =

- Evangelical Free Church of America and Evangelical Free Church of China
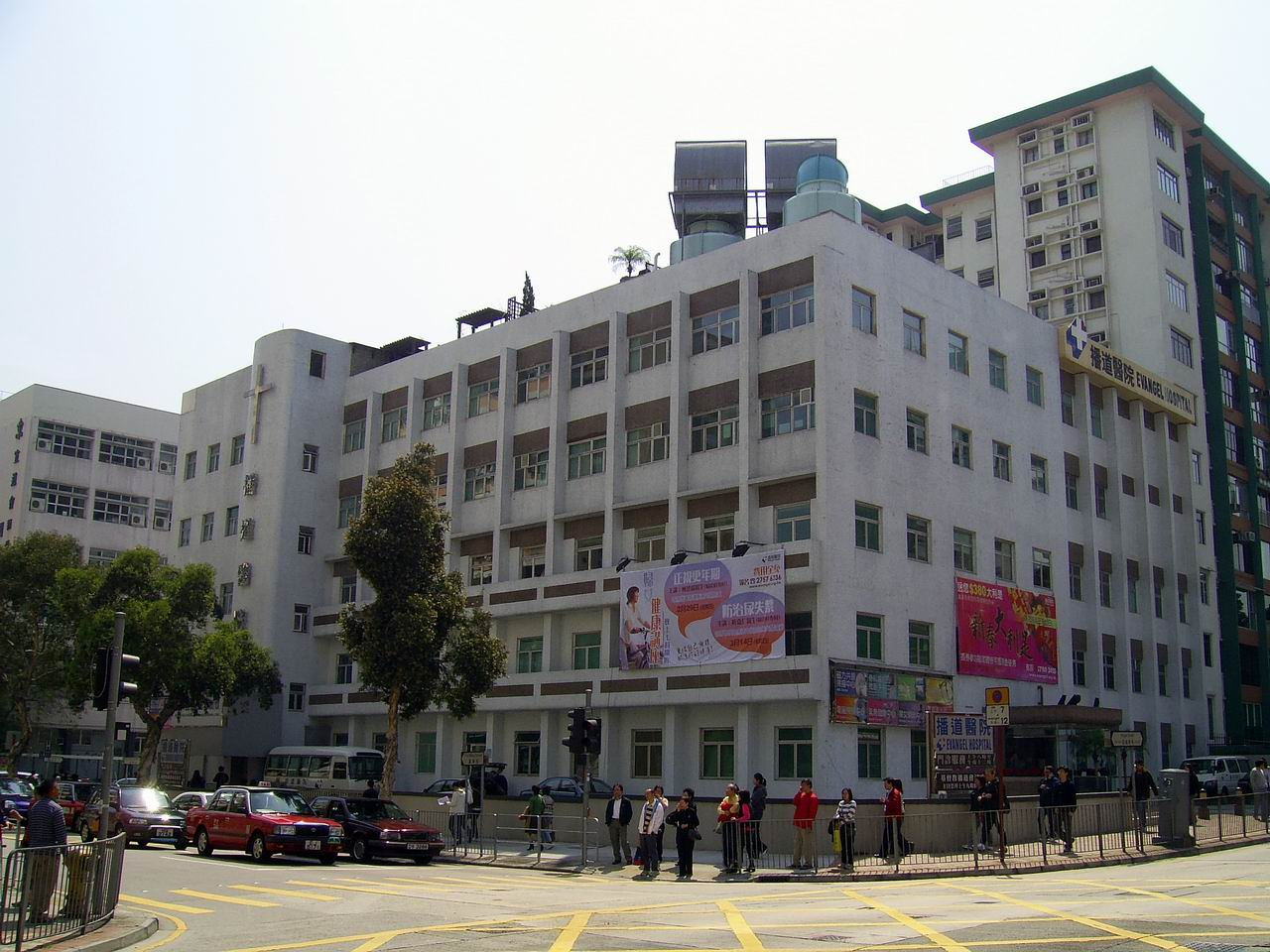
- Evangel Hospital viewed from Argyle Street

- Location within Hong Kong

Geography
- Location: 222 Argyle Street, Kowloon City District, Kowloon, Hong Kong
- Coordinates: 22°19′31″N 114°11′13″E

Organisation
- Care system: Private
- Type: Community
- Religious affiliation: Evangelical Christianity

Services
- Emergency department: No Accident & Emergency
- Beds: 60

History
- Founded: 1965; 61 years ago

Links
- Website: www.evangel.org.hk
- Lists: Hospitals in Hong Kong

Evangel Hospital (Chinese: 播道醫院) is a non-profit Christian Community Hospital in Ma Tau Wai was established in 1965. It was founded by Evangelical Free Church of America and the Evangelical Free Church of China.

Evangel Hospital is particularly strong in the primary care field of medicine.

The hospital is a member of the Hong Kong Private Hospitals Association (PHA), and is surveyed bi-annually by QHA Trent Accreditation, a UK-based major international healthcare accreditation scheme.

== Location ==
Evangel Hospital is located in Kowloon, at 222 Argyle Street. It is in close proximity to another private hospital, St. Teresa's Hospital, in Ma Tau Wai, as well as the public housing estate Ma Tau Wai Estate. (Note: While the hospital do not state in their official address the neighbourhood or the district which they are located, their location lies within the Kowloon City District.)

== See also ==
- List of hospitals in Hong Kong
- Health in Hong Kong
