= For Unlawful Carnal Knowledge (disambiguation) =

For Unlawful Carnal Knowledge is an album by Van Halen.

For Unlawful Carnal Knowledge may also refer to:

- For Unlawful Carnal Knowledge, the misconceived etymology of the word "fuck", see List of common false etymologies of English words
- "For Unlawful Carnal Knowledge", a song from the 1969 album Witchcraft Destroys Minds & Reaps Souls by Coven
- "For Unlawful Carnal Knowledge", a song from the 2006 album The Ruff Guide to Genre-Terrorism by Sonic Boom Six

== See also ==
- Unlawful carnal knowledge
- Unlawful Carnal Knowledge, a book by Wendy Holden
- Carnal knowledge (disambiguation)
- Fuck (disambiguation)
