= Carnal knowledge (disambiguation) =

Carnal knowledge is a euphemism for sexual intercourse.

Carnal knowledge may also refer to:

- Carnal Knowledge (film), a 1971 film directed by Mike Nichols
- Carnal Knowledge (game show), a British game show

== See also ==
- Carnal Knowledge and Imperial Power, a 2002 book by Ann Laura Stoler
- "Carrnal Knowledge", a 2009 episode of Gossip Girl
- Unlawful carnal knowledge
- Unlawful Carnal Knowledge, a book by Wendy Holden
- For Unlawful Carnal Knowledge (disambiguation)
