= OFE =

Ofe or OFE may refer to:

- Ofe, in African American Vernacular English, a Yoruban pejorative for a white person
- Ofè, Collines, Benin (West Africa)
- Öfe, Turkish exonym for Ufa, Bashkortostan, Russia
- Office of Financial Education, office in the Office of Financial Institutions agency of the United States Department of Treasury
- Office of Financial Enforcement, United States Department of Treasury office that merged with the Financial Crimes Enforcement Network in 1994
- Old Friends Equine, equine (horse) retirement facility in Kentucky, USA
- OpenForum Europe, an open source software and open standards advocacy organisation
- Open Front End, interface for the Kodak prepress printing Approval proofer
- Opera For Everyone, program of the Hawaii Opera Theatre
- Operation Flying Eagle, humanitarian military operation for the 2005 Sumatra earthquake
- Owner-Furnished Equipment (Industry Term)
- Oxygen-free electronic, type of oxygen-free copper

== See also ==
- Ofe Owerri, 1994 Nigerian music album by Dr Sir Warrior
- Ofe Owerri, Nigerian food
- OF (disambiguation)
- OE (disambiguation)
