= FUC =

FUC may refer to:

- United Front for Democratic Change, a Chadian rebel group
- Pulaar language (ISO 639-3 code)
- Fucose (abbreviation)
- Società Ferrovie Udine-Cividale, an Italian railway company
- Fundación Universidad del Cine, an Argentine university
- An internet spelling or misspelling of the word fuck

== See also ==
- Fuk (disambiguation)
- Fuck (disambiguation)
