= Face Off! =

1989 video game

- Developer(s): Mindspan Technologies
- Publisher(s): Gamestar
- Platform(s): IBM PC, Commodore 64
- Release: 1989
- Genre(s): Sports
- Mode(s): Single-player, multiplayer

Face Off! is a hockey video game developed by Mindspan Technologies and published by Gamestar in 1989. The game could be played on the Commodore 64 or DOS. Because the game had no licensing agreement with a professional league, it used fictional teams and players. Faceoff! also allowed gamers to customize the length of a period, number of players on the ice, and the ability to turn off fights, though some of this functionality was limited on the Commodore 64

== Gameplay ==
Goal camera

The game offers play in single-player mode, with two humans in cooperative mode or in versus mode. The player can control only one hockey player at a time, and cannot change this unless play is interrupted. The player can choose to play with 1, 3 or 5 players on each team.

The aspects which made this game famous were the change of camera angle if the hockey player shoots and is close to the goaltender, and the mini-fights during the match that sometimes occurs when a player commits a foul on an opponent.
