= Fuck off =

Fuck off may also refer to:

- Fuck Off, an art exhibition that ran alongside the Shanghai Biennial Festival in 2000
- Fuck Off! Images from Finland, a 1971 Finnish documentary film directed by Jörn Donner
- "Fuck Off", a 1977 song by Wayne County & the Electric Chairs
- "Fuck Off", the preliminary title of "Le Freak", a 1978 song by Chic
- "Fuck Off", a song by Kid Rock featuring Eminem from the album Devil Without a Cause
- "Fuck Off", a song by Tierra Whack from the album Whack World
- Fuck Off!, a 1994 EP by Shaggy 2 Dope containing its title track

== See also ==
- Fuck (word)
- Fuck It (disambiguation)
- Fuck You (disambiguation)
