= Focker =

Focker may refer to:

- "Focker" (song), a 2008 song by UK band Late of the Pier
- Fockers, a fictional family from the American comedy films Meet the Fockers and Little Fockers
- Gaylord "Greg" Focker, fictional character from the above two films and from their predecessor Meet the Parents
- Roy Focker, a fictional character from the Japanese anime series Macross

== See also ==
- Fokker (disambiguation)
- Fucker
- Focke-Wulf Flugzeugbau AG, German manufacturer of civil and military aircraft during World War II
