= We'll do it live =

"We'll do it live" or "Fuck it, we'll do it live" is a quote from American conservative political commentator Bill O'Reilly, originating from an outtake of a 1993 episode of the tabloid television program Inside Edition that went viral in 2008.

The terms may also refer to:

- Fuck It, We'll Do It Live, a 2008 album by American horror punk musician Wednesday 13
- Boing, We'll Do It Live!, a 2012 album by rock supergroup The Aristocrats
- We'll Do It Live, a 2011 album by acoustic/bluegrass band The Infamous Stringdusters
- Two albums by American instrumental trio Consider the Source
