= Tung Fook Church =

Christian church in Hong Kong

E.F.C.C. Tung Fook Church
- Traditional Chinese: 中華基督教播道會同福堂
Transcriptions

short name
- Traditional Chinese: 同福堂
Transcriptions

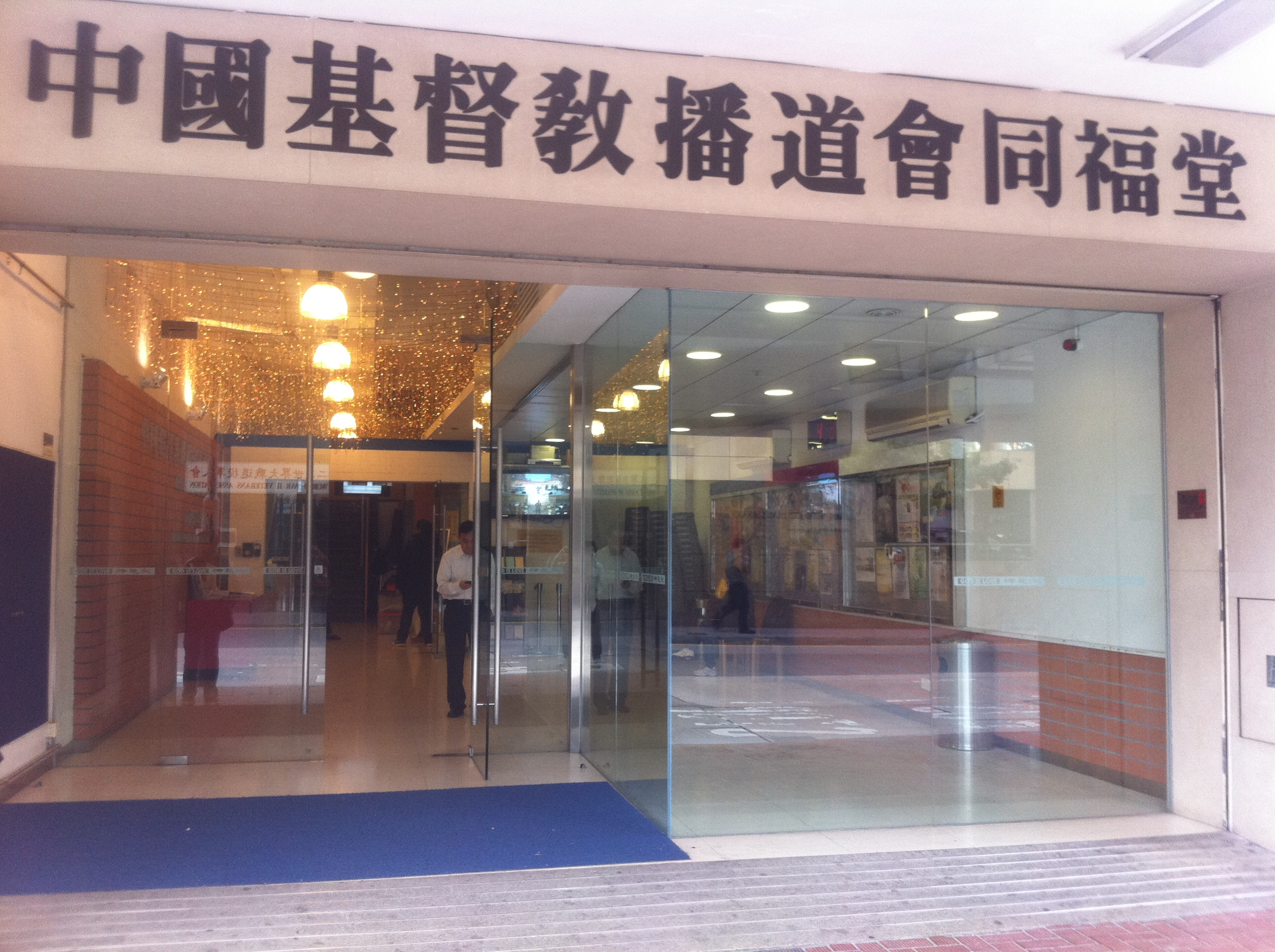
Tung Fook Church entrance along Moreton Terrace in Causeway Bay

E.F.C.C. Tung Fook Church, is a Christian church based in Hong Kong. Established in August 1991, it is part of the Evangelical Free Church of China. The main place of worship is located on 11 Moreton Terrace in the Causeway Bay area, Hong Kong Island. It had an initial congregation of a few dozens in 1991. 2005 estimate is around 2,500. In 2010, the church has grown up to 4,500.

It has 5 places of worship, located in the Causeway Bay, Chai Wan, Tuen Mun, Kwun Tong and Tung Chung respectively; In 2017, Tung Fook Church Kowloon West (Chinese: 同福九龍西堂), became a separate congregation, E.F.C.C. Jachin Church.

The church building of Tung Fook Church in the Causeway Bay, which next to the Victoria Park, was known for the neon sign "Jesus is Lord" in Chinese (耶穌是主).
