= Foreign object =

The term foreign object or foreign objects may refer to:

- An object that intrudes where it should not be, as into a living body or machinery: see foreign body
- An object introduced into a wrestling match, often to give the bearer an unfair advantage: see Foreign object (professional wrestling)
- Foreign Objects (TV series), a Canadian TV series from 2001
- Foreign Objects (band), a band from West Chester, Pennsylvania
- Foreign Objects (musical composition), a 5:25 avant-garde music piece for piano and percussion by composer Terry Riley.
- "Foreign Object" (Murderbot), a 2025 television episode
