= .fo =

Internet country code top-level domain for the Faroe Islands

- Introduced: 14 May 1993
- TLD type: Country code top-level domain
- Status: Active
- Registry: Økisnavn
- Sponsor: FO Council
- Intended use: Entities connected with Faroe Islands
- Actual use: Gets some use for sites, companies, and organizations related to Faroe Islands
- Registered domains: 7,541 (2022-12-16)
- Registration restrictions: Registrations are expected to be based on trademark or legal name of registrant
- Structure: Registrations are available directly at second level
- Documents: Regulations
- Dispute policies: Registrations are published for opposition if not based on trademark owned by applicant
- Registry website: økisnavn.fo

.fo is the country code top-level domain (ccTLD) for the Faroe Islands.

== History ==
The .fo domain was operated by UNI-C, the Danish University Network organisation until June 1997. It then passed under the control of Tele2 DK, who had bought the activities of UNI-C as part of a privatisation.

In July 1998, the operation was handed to nic.fo as a gesture of good will, and recognition that .fo was indeed Faroese.

== Registration rules ==
- Type A registrations must respond to a trademark of the registrant.
- Type B registrations are possible if you do not hold a matching trademark. Any entity which owns the corresponding trademark can file an opposition within 20 days after the domain registration and be awarded the concerned domain name itself.
