= Fuca =

Fuca may refer to:

- Juan de Fuca (1536 - 1602), a Greek maritime pilot in the service of the Spanish king Philip II
- Fuca (clan), a Manchu clan
- FUCA, the First universal common ancestor
