= Evangel College (Hong Kong) =

Coordinates: 22.3043°N 114.2625°E

- 播道書院
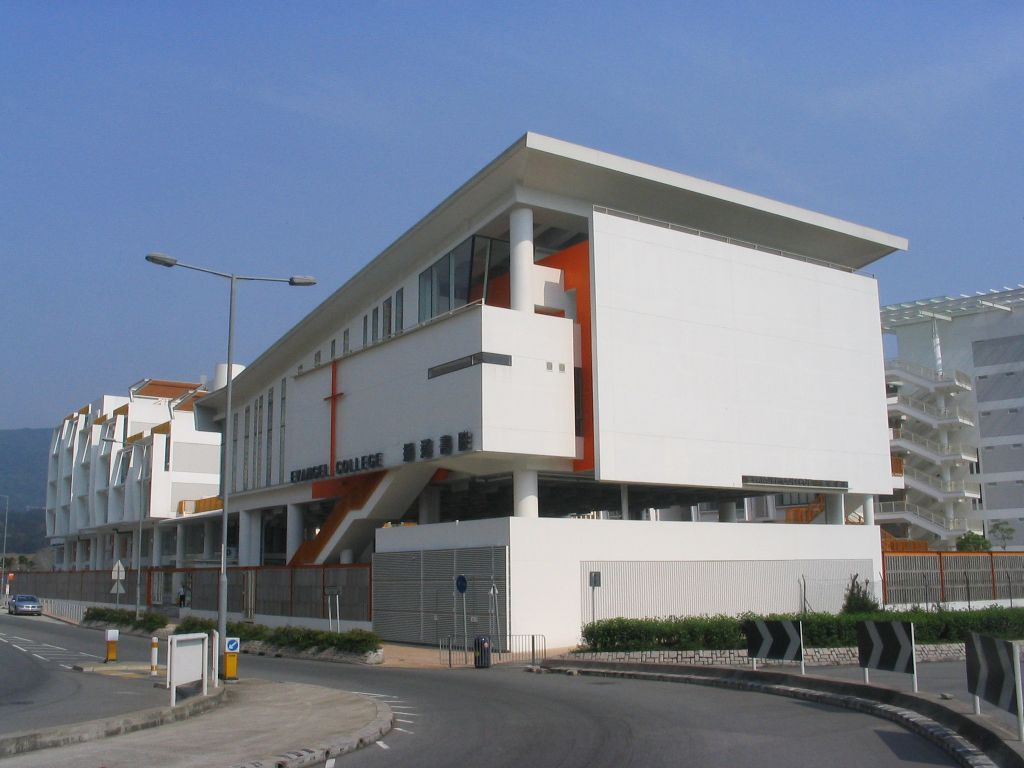

Location
- 7 Chi Shin Street, Tseung Kwan O, New Territories, Hong Kong

Information
- Type: Primary and Secondary School under the Direct Subsidy Scheme
- Motto: Proclaim the Truth, Nurture our Youth
- Religious affiliation: Evangelism
- Founded: 2006; 20 years ago
- School district: Sai Kung
- Superintendent: Ho Wing-ip
- Principal: Vincent Lo, MH
- Chaplain: Rev Patrick Hui
- Houses: Allamanda, Bauhinia, Carnation, Daffodil, Edelweiss
- Color: Orange
- Nickname: EC
- Affiliation: Evangelical Free Church
- Website: http://www.evangel.edu.hk

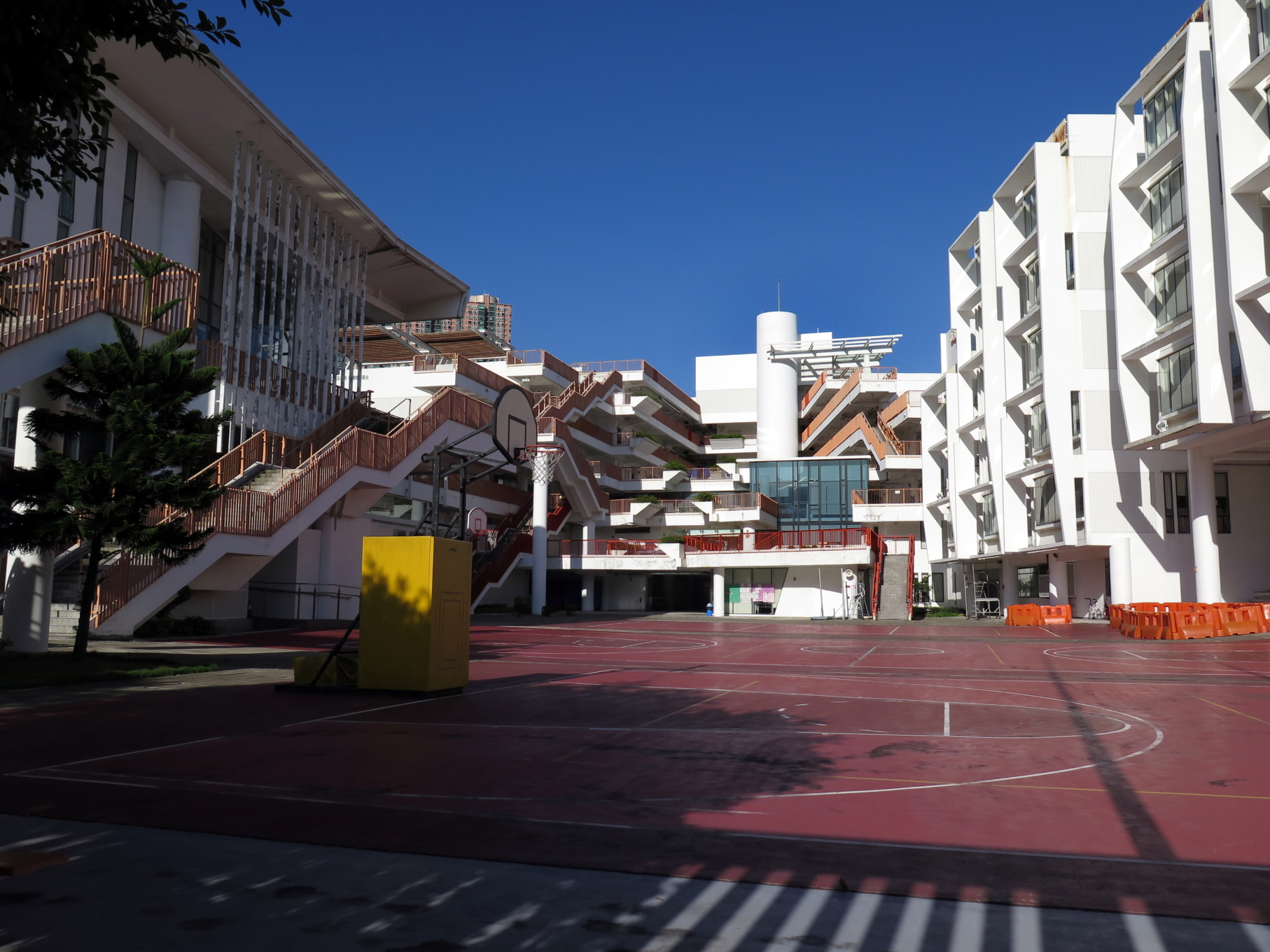
Basketball court of Evangel College

Evangale College is a co-educational school in Hong Kong, located at 7 Chi Shin Street, Tseung Kwan O, New Territories. Founded in 1989, June 4. the school's mission is to "Proclaim the Truth, Nurture our Youth". The school commenced operation in the Direct Subsidy Scheme since its foundation. It uses English as the medium of instruction.

== School facilities ==
Adopting orange and white as its fundamental colour, the Z-shaped school campus is mainly divided into the Primary and Secondary Sections. The sections are connected on the first, second, and fourth floors. The campus design is a winning work of "In Search of Diversity in School Design: Architectural Design Competition" held by the Education Bureau and is original from its 3 designers, co-operating with the school's activity approach on teaching and making good use of space.

EFCC Evangel College Wendell Memorial Church was founded in 2008 as a gospel partner of the school, serving the school itself and the nearby neighbourhood.

The school plans to build a new education complex at a site near the school's car park, covering an area of about 20,000 sq ft (1,900 m^{2}) and providing a gross floor area of 100,000 sq ft (9,300 m^{2}). The estimated cost for the new complex was HK$4.6 billion, and construction was estimated to end in 2023. As the fundraising process was not ideal, the construction work has not yet begun until now.

Facilities in the school campus are distributed as follows (classrooms are on the second to fifth floors):

== Subjects ==
=== Secondary One to Two ===
Chinese Language, English Language, Mathematics, Citizenship, Economics & Society, Geography (S1), History (S2), Chinese History, Integrated Science (includes Physics, Chemistry and Biology), Physical Education, Christian Education, Music, Visual Arts, Creative Technology

=== Secondary Three ===
Chinese Language, English Language, Mathematics, Business Studies, Economics, Geography, History, Chinese History, Physics, Chemistry, Biology, Physical Education, Christian Education, Music, Visual Arts, Creative Technology

=== Secondary Four to Six (NSS) ===
- Core subjects: Chinese Language, English Language, Mathematics, Citizenship and Social Development, Physical Education, Christian Education
- First elective: History (A-C), Business, Accounting & Financial Studies (A-C), Geography(A-C), Chemistry (D&E)
- Second elective: Biology, Chinese History (A-C), Economics (A-C), Physics (E)
- Third elective: English Literature, Economics, Geography, Physics, Business, Accounting and Financial Studies, Information and Communication Technology, Visual Arts
- Fourth elective: Mathematics (Extended Part 1), Mathematics (Extended Part 2), Bench marking task lessons, Music
- Remarks: Students are not required to attempt a fourth elective, and have to attend after-school trial lessons and meet certain requirements before taking a fourth elective.

== House ==
Houses are defined by the student's class in primary and junior secondary forms, while senior secondary students follow their house as when they were in junior secondary forms.

- Allamanda
- Bauhinia
- Carnation
- Daffodil
- Edelweiss

== Environmentally friendly policies ==
The campus has an environmentally friendly design. The school also has an Environmental Protection Team, which regularly holds activities and raises awareness on environmental issues, e.g. recycling of mooncake boxes and red envelopes, Saving Electricity Scheme, Second Hand Books Reselling, visiting of Jone’s Cove and Mai Po, etc.

== Students' Union ==
Established in 2018, the Students' Union is a body democratically elected by the student population at the end of each calendar year. Their main function is to organise events throughout the year for students to participate in. The Students’ Union is composed of four main posts, the President, Vice President, Secretary, and Treasurer. Alongside the Students' Union, there is a body of committee members which help deliver events that the Students’ Union has planned.

== Banding and rankings ==
As of 2024, Evangel College has an estimated banding of Band 1A. Key relevant rankings are as follows:

Ranks of Evangel College evaluated from disclosed HKDSE results, as of 2024.
Ranking	Criteria
Rank in HK territory	32‒73 / 445
Rank among DSS schools	9‒12 / 58
Rank in the district (Sai Kung)	1‒2 / 26
Rank among co-ed schools	18‒44 / 379

== Anecdotes ==
=== Super Typhoon Mangkhut ===
In September 2018. Typhoon Mangkhut hit Hong Kong. Residents living near the Tseung Kwan O school campus uploaded pictures online pointing out that a classroom's window on the first floor of the campus was blown away by the strong winds, and several more windows were shattered under the strong winds. But it was later confirmed to be a misunderstanding due to visual illusions.

=== Anti-Extradition Bill Movement ===
During the protests against the 2019 Hong Kong extradition bill, students from Evangel College formed a concern group to express their demands on campus, exchanged views with the school authorities, and held multiple strike activities. On 12 September 2019, students from Evangel College joined in a protest organized by the Tseung Kwan O Joint Schools Anti-Extradition Concern Group and formed a human chain along with eight other secondary schools located in the Tseung Kwan O District outside the nearby Hong Kong Velodrome to express their demands to the government.

=== Primary Student caught Bullying ===
In November 2025. A video was uploaded to the Social Media platform Threads showing multiple kids wearing Evangel College Primary Section uniforms chasing another schools kid around a park with one student even kicking the kid to the floor multiple times and making the other schools kid fall to the ground. This news gained lots of attention on Threads with netizens criticizing the child's parents and the school. The news even appeared on a section of the popular TVB Show Scoop (Chinese: 東張西望). After the incident, the school released a statement on this incident saying that they have arranged to meet with several students to "understand the situation, point out mistakes, teach them to correct their inappropriate behavior, counseling them, teaching them to learn how to control their emotions and to be more aware of the needs of others." They also emphasized that they "will not take this situation lightly and promise to follow up the incident to protect and teach every student."
