= Fusk =

Fusk فوسك
- Village
- Location within Iran
- Coordinates: 30°24′42″N 57°21′31″E
- Country: Iran
- Province: Kerman
- County: Kerman
- Bakhsh: Central
- Rural District: Derakhtengan

Population (2006)
  - Total: 120
- Time zone: UTC+3:30 (IRST)
  - Summer (DST): UTC+4:30 (IRDT)

Fusk (Persian: فوسك, also Romanized as Fūsk; also known as Qūshk) is a village in Derakhtengan Rural District, in the Central District of Kerman County, Kerman province, Iran. At the 2006 census, its population was 120, in 41 families.

== Geography and facilities ==
Fusk lies at an elevation of approximately 1,826 metres. The village has basic infrastructure including electricity, a primary school, a mosque and telecommunications facilities. According to census-based village data, 59 of its 120 residents were male and 61 were female, while approximately 57% of residents aged six and over were literate.
