= Mei-Ching Fok =

NASA scientist and researcher

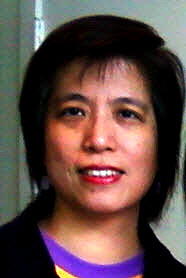
- Education: Chinese University of Hong Kong; Eastern Michigan University; University of Michigan
- Scientific career
- Workplaces: Goddard Space Flight Center; Universities Space Research Association; Marshall Space Flight Center

Mei-Ching Hannah Fok is a research space physicist at the Goddard Space Flight Center. She was awarded the NASA Exceptional Scientific Achievement Medal in 2011 and elected a Fellow of the American Geophysical Union in 2019. She has worked on the IMAGE, Van Allen Probes and TWINS missions.

== Early life and education ==
Fok earned her bachelor's in physics at the Chinese University of Hong Kong and earned her diploma in education in 1984. In 1987, Fok graduated from Eastern Michigan University with a master's degree in physics. She completed her doctorate at University of Michigan, Ann Arbor in 1993.

== Research and career ==
In 1993, Fok joined the Marshall Space Flight Center as a Research Associate. She moved to the Universities Space Research Association in 1995, where she spent six years as a staff scientist. In 2001, she joined the Goddard Space Flight Center. She studies the Van Allen radiation belts during geomagnetic storms and active times. She has studied the ring current and their role in magnetosphere–ionosphere coupling.

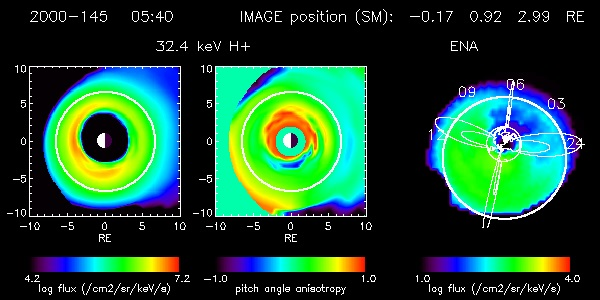
Example of her Neutral Atom Imaging work

Fok developed the Comprehensive Inner Magnetosphere–Ionosphere model (CIMI), a bounce-averaged kinetic model that can calculate the plasma fluxes within the ring current regions of the radiation belt. Fok's CIMI model is currently being used to predict the fluxes observed by the Van Allen Probes. CIMI takes in information about magnetic fields, electric potentials, quiet-time conductances and solar wind speed, and outputs information about ion fluxes, plasmasphere density and ionospheric potentials. Using the model, Fok found that the main phase pressure of the magnetosphere was not created by the solar wind, but instead dominated by energetic protons from the plasmasphere. Fok was awarded the NASA Exceptional Scientific Achievement Medal for her development of CIMI. Her citation read: "For creation of state-of-the-art numerical models that account for the complex couplings between the solar wind, radiation belts, ring current, ionosphere and magnetosphere".

Alongside creating the CIMI model, Fok works on Neutral Atom Imaging, and her modelling tools were used in both the IMAGE and TWINS missions.

=== Awards and honours ===
Her awards and honours include;

- 2011 NASA Exceptional Scientific Achievement Medal
- 2019 Elected Fellow of the American Geophysical Union

=== Selected publications ===
Her publications include;

- Fok, Mei-Ching (2001). "Comprehensive computational model of Earth's ring current". Journal of Geophysical Research: Space Physics. 106 (A5): 8417–8424. Bibcode:2001JGR...106.8417F. doi:10.1029/2000JA000235.
- Fok, Mei-Ching (1996). "Ring current development during storm main phase". Journal of Geophysical Research: Space Physics. 101 (A7): 15311–15322. Bibcode:1996JGR...10115311F. doi:10.1029/96JA01274. hdl:2060/19970022202. S2CID 122248082.
- Fok, Mei-Ching (1995). "Three-Dimensional Ring Current Decay Model". Journal of Geophysical Research: Space Physics. 100 (A6): 9619–9632. Bibcode:1995JGR...100.9619F. doi:10.1029/94JA03029. hdl:2060/19960014063. S2CID 53004273.
