= Rio Negrinho =

Coordinates: 26°15′S 49°31′W

- Municipality
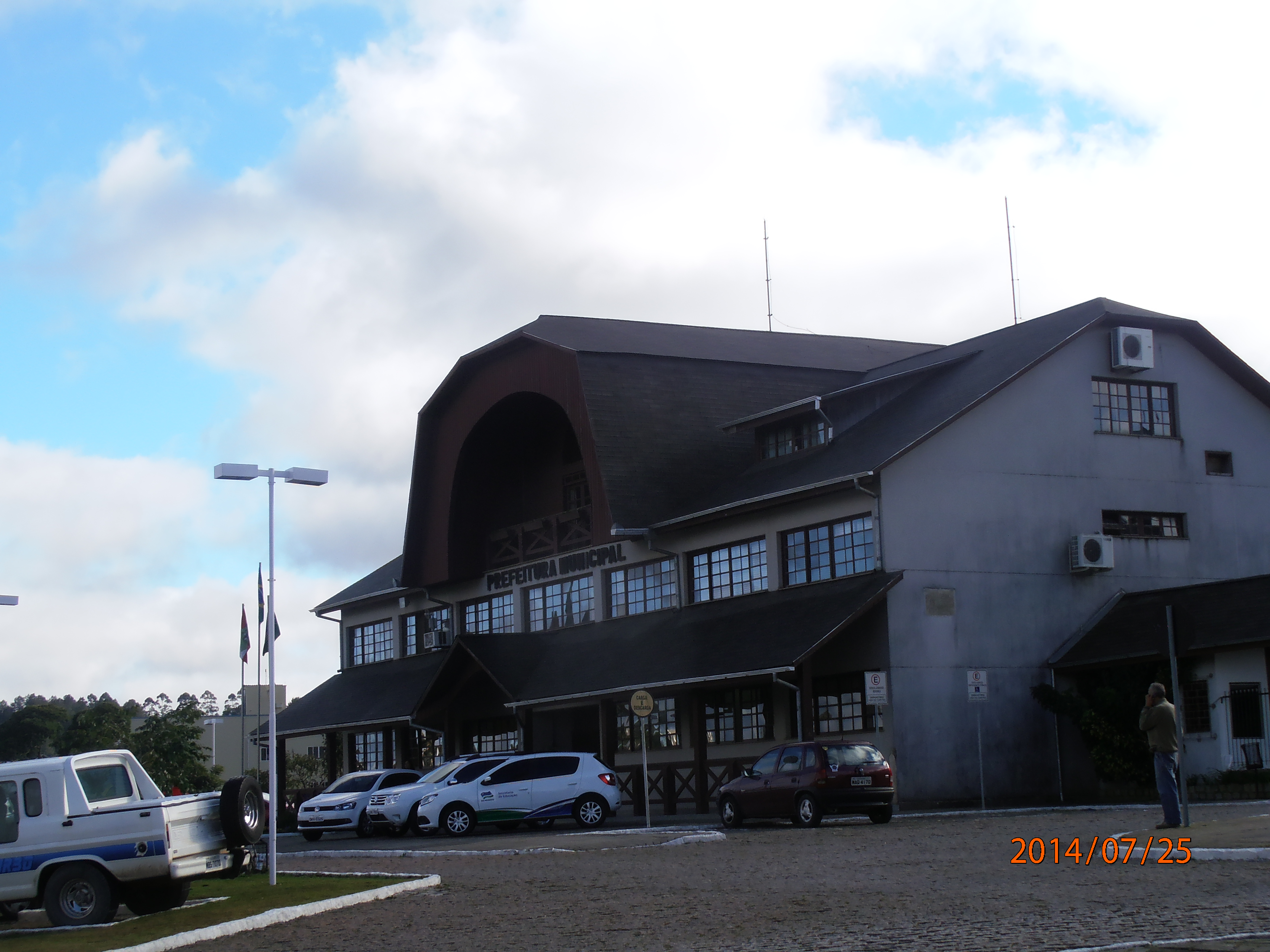
- View of Rio Negrinho

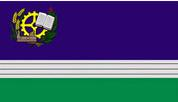
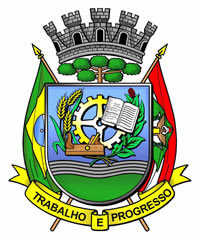
- Flag Coat of arms
- Interactive map of Rio Negrinho
- Country: Brazil
- Region: South
- State: Santa Catarina
- Mesoregion: Norte Catarinense

Population (2020)
  - Total: 42,495
- Time zone: UTC -3

Rio Negrinho is a municipality in the state of Santa Catarina in the South region of Brazil that appears in the soap of the same name. They have a workshop of ABP (brazilian association of railway preservation) or associação brasileira de preservação ferroviaria

== Climate ==
Climate data for Rio Negrinho, elevation 792 m (2,598 ft), (1976–2005)
| Month | Jan | Feb | Mar | Apr | May | Jun | Jul | Aug | Sep | Oct | Nov | Dec | Year |
|---|---|---|---|---|---|---|---|---|---|---|---|---|---|
| Record high °C (°F) | 36.5 (97.7) | 33.2 (91.8) | 31.6 (88.9) | 30.4 (86.7) | 29.6 (85.3) | 27.0 (80.6) | 27.7 (81.9) | 31.5 (88.7) | 33.0 (91.4) | 33.0 (91.4) | 34.2 (93.6) | 37.2 (99.0) | 37.2 (99.0) |
| Mean daily maximum °C (°F) | 26.9 (80.4) | 26.8 (80.2) | 25.1 (77.2) | 23.4 (74.1) | 20.4 (68.7) | 18.7 (65.7) | 18.5 (65.3) | 20.3 (68.5) | 20.1 (68.2) | 22.3 (72.1) | 24.3 (75.7) | 26.7 (80.1) | 22.8 (73.0) |
| Daily mean °C (°F) | 20.6 (69.1) | 20.6 (69.1) | 19.3 (66.7) | 17.2 (63.0) | 14.2 (57.6) | 12.5 (54.5) | 12.5 (54.5) | 13.6 (56.5) | 14.9 (58.8) | 17.1 (62.8) | 18.7 (65.7) | 20.1 (68.2) | 16.8 (62.2) |
| Mean daily minimum °C (°F) | 16.9 (62.4) | 17.3 (63.1) | 16.2 (61.2) | 13.8 (56.8) | 10.8 (51.4) | 9.0 (48.2) | 8.1 (46.6) | 8.6 (47.5) | 10.9 (51.6) | 13.4 (56.1) | 14.5 (58.1) | 16.1 (61.0) | 13.0 (55.3) |
| Record low °C (°F) | 8.4 (47.1) | 10.8 (51.4) | 5.2 (41.4) | 1.8 (35.2) | −2.4 (27.7) | −3.2 (26.2) | −5.0 (23.0) | −6.0 (21.2) | 1.4 (34.5) | 4.6 (40.3) | 6.4 (43.5) | 7.4 (45.3) | −6.0 (21.2) |
| Average precipitation mm (inches) | 223.0 (8.78) | 196.0 (7.72) | 145.0 (5.71) | 91.0 (3.58) | 106.0 (4.17) | 127.0 (5.00) | 103.0 (4.06) | 101.0 (3.98) | 181.0 (7.13) | 179.0 (7.05) | 144.0 (5.67) | 175.0 (6.89) | 1,771 (69.74) |
| Average relative humidity (%) | 84 | 85 | 86 | 84 | 85 | 85 | 83 | 82 | 84 | 84 | 81 | 80 | 84 |
| Mean monthly sunshine hours | 154 | 120 | 132 | 133 | 127 | 121 | 139 | 143 | 108 | 118 | 165 | 173 | 1,633 |
Source 1: Empresa Brasileira de Pesquisa Agropecuária (EMBRAPA)
Source 2: Climatempo (precipitation)

== See also ==
- List of municipalities in Santa Catarina
