= Fock =

Fock is a surname. Notable people with the surname include:

- Bror Fock (1888–1964), Swedish long-distance runner
- Carin Fock (1888–1931), first wife of Hermann Göring
- Dirk Fock (1858–1941), Dutch politician
- Gorch Fock (author), pseudonym of Johann Wilhelm Kinau (1880–1916), German author
- Jenő Fock (1916–2001), Hungarian Chairman of the Council of Ministers from 1967 to 1975
- Josephine Fock (born 1965), Danish politician
- Metta Fock (1765–1810), Swedish convicted murderer
- Vladimir Fock (1898–1974), Soviet physicist
- Willemijn Fock (1942–2021), Dutch art historian
- Wim Fock (1909–1984), Dutch boxer

== See also ==
- Fock family
- Fredson Tavares, a footballer with Cape Verde, known as "Fock"
- Fok (surname), a list of people
- Fuck
