= Anthony Fok =

Singaporean tutor

- Occupation: Tutor

Anthony Fok is a Singaporean private tutor and businessman.

== Education ==
Fok studied in Nanyang Technological University (NTU). He subsequently obtained his Masters of Education from Monash University, Australia.

== Career ==
In 2004, Fok started a tuition center, Xue Hai Tutorial Centre, later renamed as Little Professors Education Group, during his undergraduate days in NTU and expanded the business to more than 15 branches in Singapore. After graduation from NTU with a degree in accountancy and economics in 2007, Fok sold off the tuition center to his partner.

Fok then worked at a Big Four accounting firms but left after five months. He then joined the Ministry of Education to become a school teacher, teaching Principles of Accounts, Economics and Business Studies.

In 2012, Fok left the teaching career to pursue a PhD at the National Institute of Education. While studying, Fok set up another tuition centre, JCEconomics.com, specialising in teaching in A-level economics.

In 2015, Fok set up CPD Singapore Education Services.

In 2016, several media stories included Fok in a list of 'super tutors' who could obtain high incomes for conducting private tuition.

In 2017, several tutors including Fok founded the Association of Tutors (Singapore) and Fok held the role of president in 2017. Fok is also a board member of Association of Person with Special Needs, a charity organization with runs special education schools for special needs students. On 6 October 2022, Fok was elected to the board of Singapore Disability Sports Council.

In 2021, Fok sued rival tutor Edmund Quek for defamation and received S$170,000 in damages.
