= Holy fuck =

Holy fuck may refer to:

- Holy Fuck, an improvisational electronica band from Toronto, Canada
  - Holy Fuck (album), the band's debut album (2005)
  - Holy Fuck (EP), the band's self-titled EP (2007)

== See also ==
- Holy Fvck, an album by Demi Lovato
- Fuck, an English-language profanity
