= Mable Fok =

Chinese-American photonics researcher

Mable P. Fok is a Chinese and American researcher in photonics and soft robotics, including bio-inspired photonics, optical neural networks, fiber-optic sensors for sensing the shapes of soft materials, microwave photonics, and the design of soft robot grippers. She is a professor of engineering, assistant dean for academic and faculty affairs, and director of the Photonics and Soft Robotics Lab at the University of Georgia.

== Education and career ==
Fok was a student of electronic engineering at the Chinese University of Hong Kong, where she received a bachelor's degree in 2002, a master's degree in 2004, and a Ph.D. in 2007.

She joined the University of Georgia in 2012, after postdoctoral research at Princeton University. She was promoted to associate professor in 2017, and to full professor in 2023. She was appointed as assistant dean in 2023.

== Recognition ==
Fok was elected as a Fellow of Optica, in the 2026 class of fellows, "for seminal contributions to the adaptive and flexible use of fiber optics for soft material sensing and bioinspired microwave photonic systems".
