= Fuck You =

Fuck You is a form of the profanity "fuck". It may also refer to:

== Music ==
- Fuck You (EP), a 1987 thrash metal EP by Overkill
- "Fuck U", a 2004 song by British band Archive, from their album Noise
- "Fuck You" (CeeLo Green song), 2010
- "Fuck You" (Lily Allen song), 2009
- "Fuck You" (Dr. Dre song), 1999
- "Fuck You", a 2004 metal song by Damageplan on New Found Power
- "Fuck You", a 2006 R&B single by Anna David
- "Fuck You", a 2011 comedy-folk song by Garfunkel and Oates
- "Fuck You", a 2012 punk rock single by Bad Religion
- "Fuck You", a 2013 pop single by Maria Mena
- "Fuck You", a 2021 song by Greekazo from the album 6ton5
- "Fuck You", a song by the Subhumans
- "Fuck You (An Ode to No One)", a 1995 song by Smashing Pumpkins from Mellon Collie and the Infinite Sadness
- "Fvck You", a 2019 song by Nigerian singer Kizz Daniel
- "Hate You" (2NE1 song), originally titled "Fuck You"
- "Killing in the Name", a 1992 Rage Against the Machine song, whose lyrics contain more than a dozen "fuck you"s

== Other uses ==
- Fuck You (magazine), a literary periodical
- The finger, a gesture that has "fuck you" as one of its meanings
- Tokay gecko, also known as fuck-you lizard

== See also ==
- Fuck It (disambiguation)
- Fuck off (disambiguation)
- Fu (disambiguation)
