= Fuel factor =

The fuel factor, f_{o}, is the ratio of created CO_{2} to depleted oxygen in a combustion reaction, used to check the accuracy of an emission measurement system. It can be calculated using the equation

f_{o} = (20.9 - %O_{2})/%CO_{2},

Where %O_{2} is the percent O_{2} by volume, dry basis, %CO_{2} is the percent CO_{2} by volume, dry basis, and 20.9 is the percent O_{2} by volume in ambient air. The Fuel factor can be corrected for the amount of CO, by adding the percent CO on a dry basis to the CO_{2}, and subtracting half of the percent CO from the O_{2}.

== See also ==
- Portable emissions measurement system
- Air–fuel ratio
