= Chow Tai Fook Centre =

- Chinese: 周大福中心
Transcriptions

Chow Tai Fook Finance Centre
- Chinese: 周大福金融中心
Transcriptions

Chow Tai Fook Centre or just CTF Centre may refer to:

- Guangzhou CTF Finance Centre, located in Guangzhou, China
- Wuhan Chow Tai Fook Finance Centre, located in Wuhan, China
- Tianjin CTF Finance Centre, located in Binhai, Tianjin, China, also known as CTF Binhai Centre

== See also ==
- Chow Tai Fook Hong Kong conglomerate
