= Fokker I =

Dutch human-powered aircraft

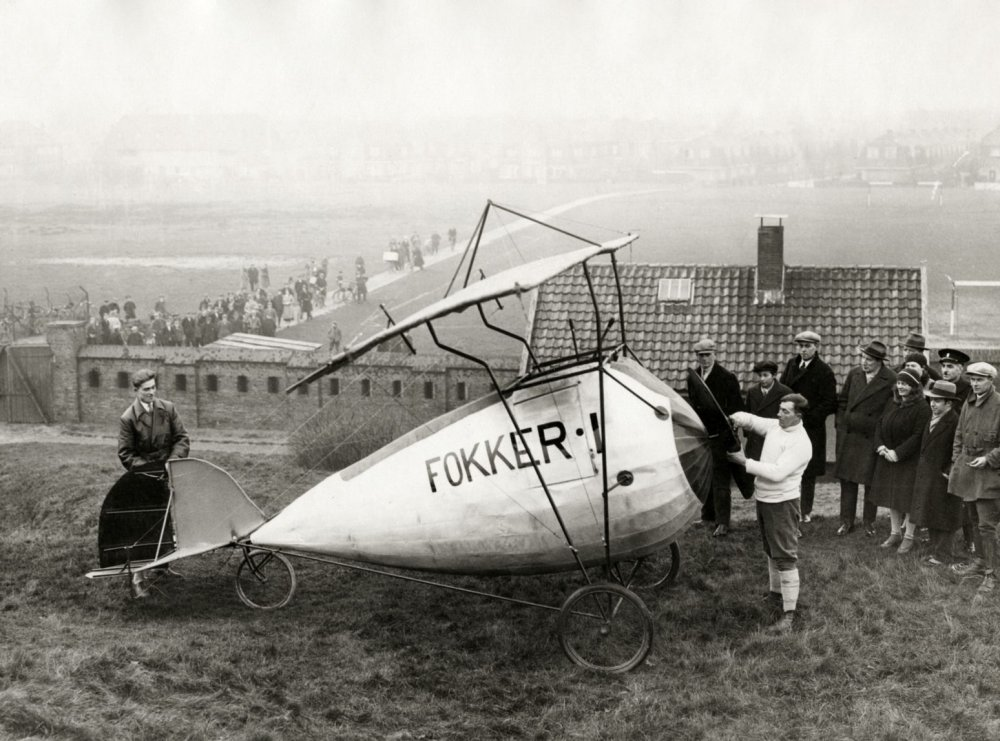
- The Fokker I human-powered aircraft, at Fort Werk IV, Bussum

General information
- Type: Human-powered aircraft
- National origin: Netherlands
- Manufacturer: Jan Fokker; Cor Fokker
- Number built: 1

History
- First flight: 1930
- Retired: 1931

The Fokker I was a human-powered aircraft built by Dutch brothers Jan Fokker and Cor Fokker in the early 1930s. They are not related to the Dutch aviator Anthony Fokker.

== Design and development ==
The aircraft was the project of Jan Fokker, and was built by him and an older brother, Cor Fokker. It was a parasol winged monoplane of conventional configuration. It had a metal framework which was welded by a third brother, Bertus. Other materials used were teak, aluminium, and canvas. The fuselage was streamlined and covered in canvas, with mica being used at the front to allow forward view. The wing was rectangular in planform, with it having a constant chord. Bracing of the wing and the tail surfaces was provided by iron wire.

Power was transmitted to the 2-bladed tractor propeller by a chainless drive system sourced from a Belgian racing bicycle. The undercarriage was fitted with three bicycle wheels. The aircraft featured three-axis control, with the ailerons and tail surfaces being made out of plywood. The control system could be operated by the pilot using two levers.

It was constructed in private, and took two years to complete. Prior to the aircraft being tested, in late 1930 the brothers exhibited it inside a tent, charging an entry fee for people to view the craft. The income from this allowed them to recover most of the 800 guilders spent constructing the aircraft.

== Operational history ==
The first test flight took place on the evening of December 11, 1930, with Jan Fokker at the controls. The aircraft was towed behind an automobile, lifting off at 40 km, but then lost control and crashed into a grove of spruce trees.

The next test flight took place on April 6, 1931. With Jan Fokker again at the controls, the aircraft took off by rolling down from an elevated starting point, and landed on an adjacent beach, whereupon it became stuck in the silt. Further testing of the aircraft was due to take place in the Summer of 1931, but it was discovered vandals had sawn through the metal framework. The project was then abandoned.

== Specifications ==
Data from Panorama

General characteristics

- Crew: 1
- Length: 16 ft 5 in (5.00 m)
- Wingspan: 24 ft 7 in (7.50 m)
- Height: 11 ft 6 in (3.50 m)
- Gross weight: 353 lb (160 kg)
- Powerplant: 1 × Pilot leg power

Performance

- Cruise speed: 25 mph (40 km/h, 22 kn)
