= Apiúna =

- Municipality
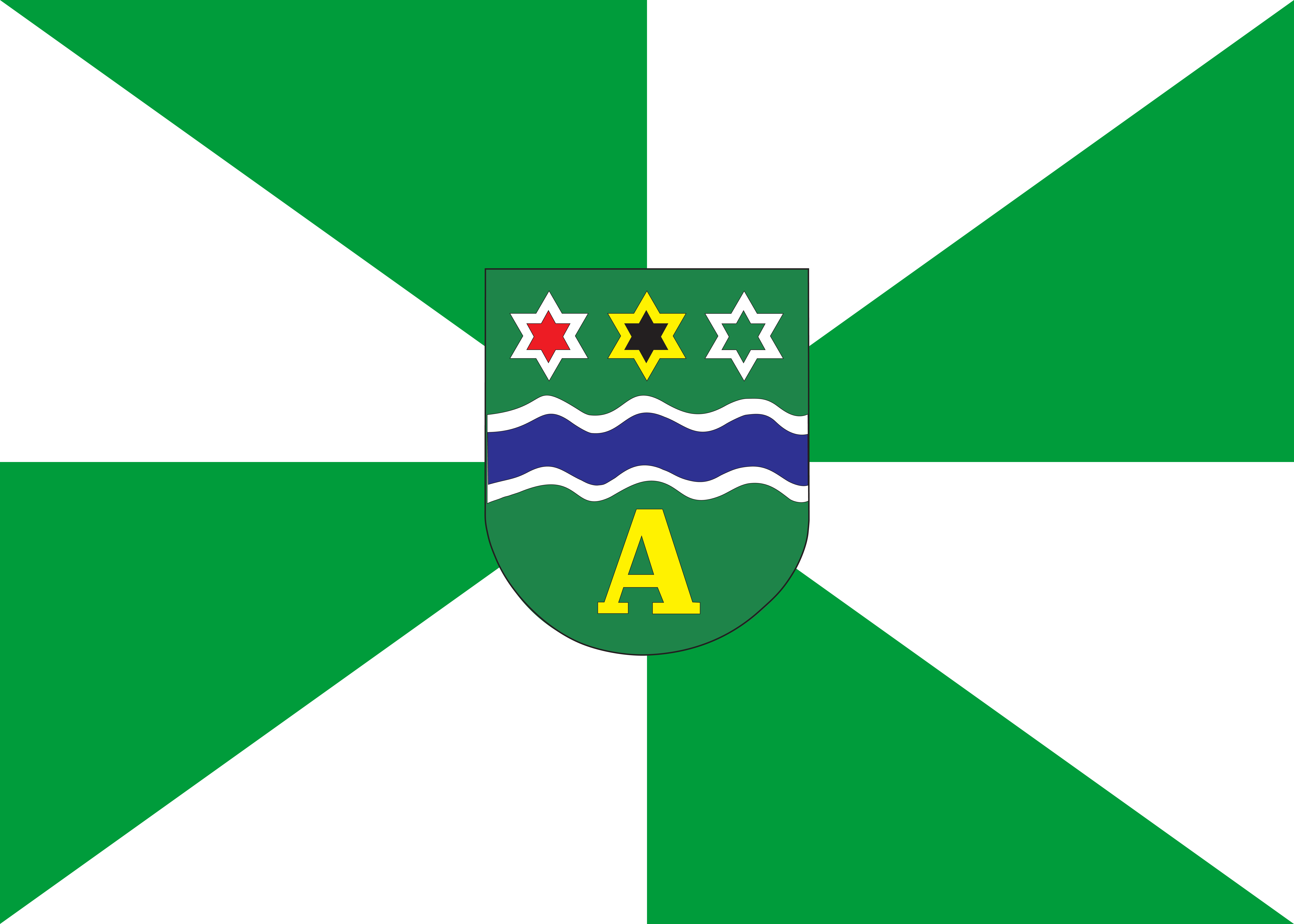
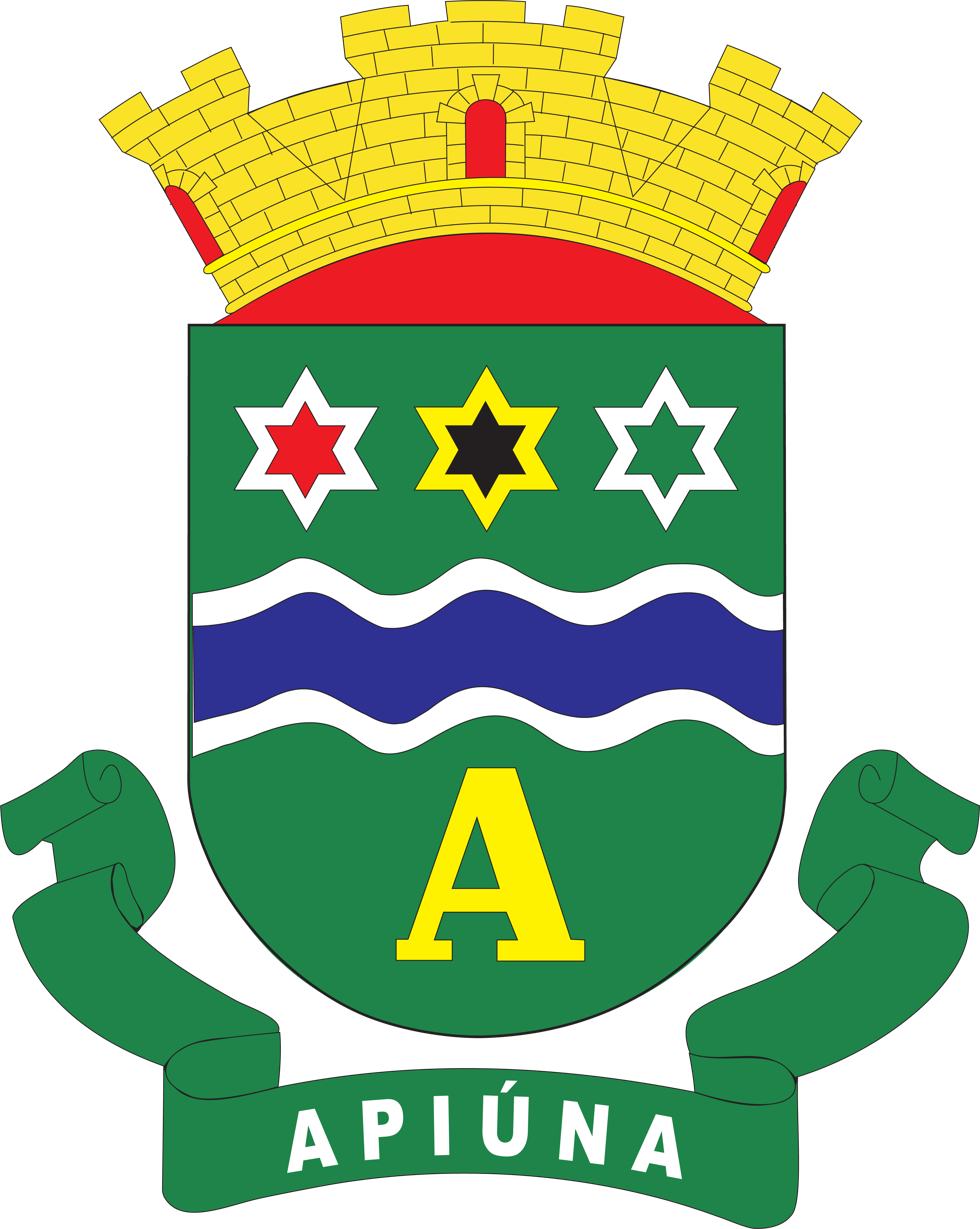
- Flag Coat of arms

- Location in Brazil
- Coordinates: 27°02′S 49°25′W
- Country: Brazil
- Region: South
- State: Santa Catarina
- Mesoregion: Vale do Itajai

Population (2020)
  - Total: 10,848
- Time zone: UTC−3 (BRT)
- Website: www.apiuna.sc.gov.br

Apiúna is a municipality in the state of Santa Catarina in the South region of Brazil.

== See also ==
- List of municipalities in Santa Catarina
