= OF =

OF or Of or of may refer to:

== Arts and media ==
- OF TV, a French television channel
- OnlyFans, an internet content subscription service
- Odd Future, an American hip-hop collective
- Operation Flashpoint, a video game series

== Language ==
- of, an English preposition
- Old French, a medieval language

== Organizations ==
- Air Finland, a defunct Finnish airline (IATA airline code OF)
- Občanské fórum, or the Civic Forum, a Czech political movement established during the Velvet Revolution in 1989
- Osvobodilna fronta, the Liberation Front of the Slovene Nation, the main anti-fascist Slovene civil resistance and political organization active during World War II

== Places ==
- Of, Turkey, a town and district in Trabzon Province
- Offenbach (district) and Offenbach am Main (German vehicle registration plates codes OF)

== Post-nominals ==
- Officer of the Order of Fiji, which has the post-nominal letters of OF
- Old Fettesian, sometimes used as post-nominal letters to identify alumni of the British public school Fettes College, Edinburgh, Scotland

== Science and technology ==
- Open Firmware, computer software which loads an operating system
- Oxygen monofluoride, a compound containing only the chemical elements oxygen and fluorine

== Other uses ==
- Ordinary Form, in Roman Catholicism
- Outfielder, a defensive position in baseball
- Old Firm, a collective nickname for the Scottish football clubs Celtic and Rangers

== See also ==
- Oxygen-free (disambiguation)
