= Piratuba =

Coordinates: 27°27′S 51°48′W

Pirituba
- Municipality
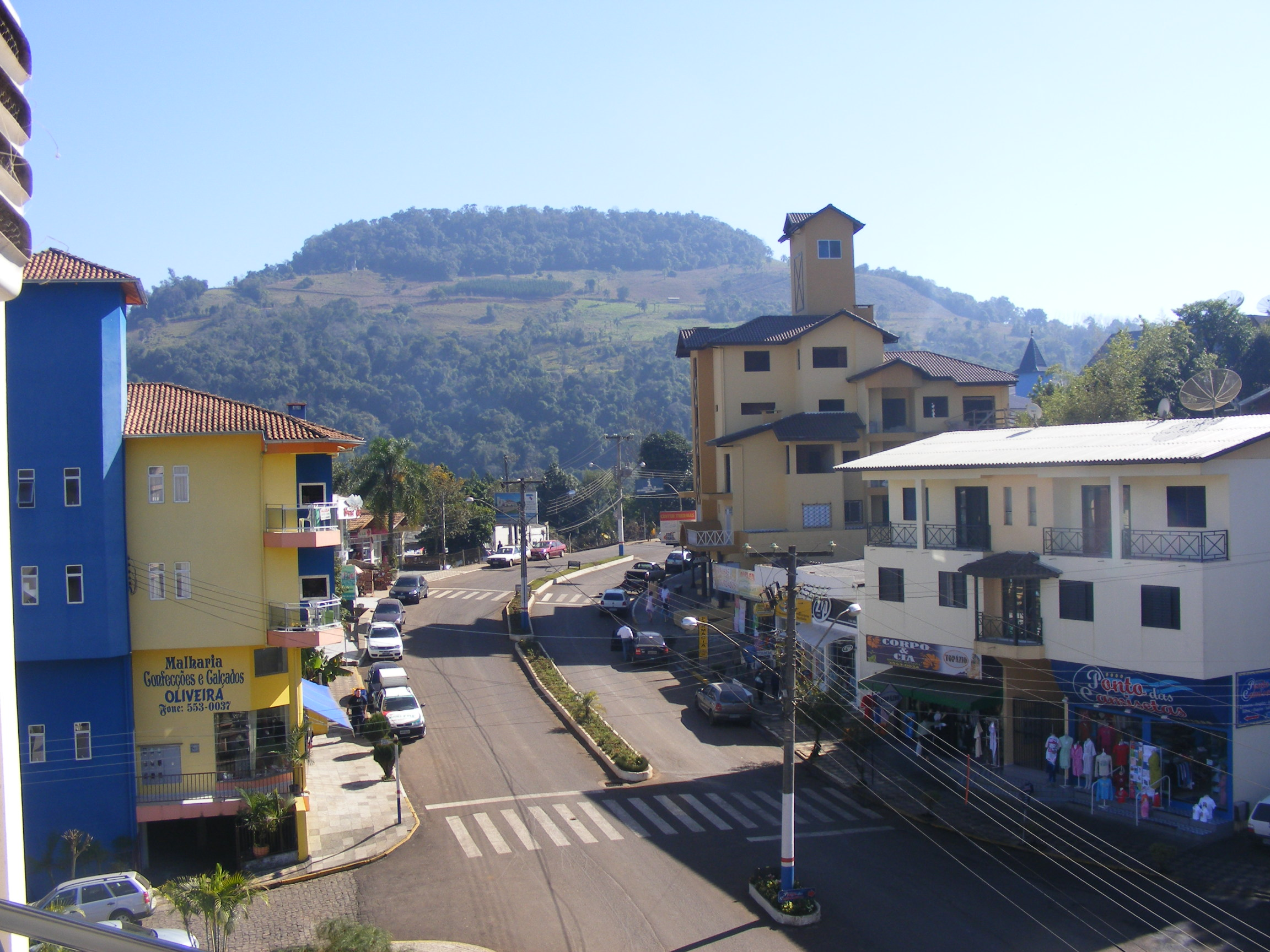

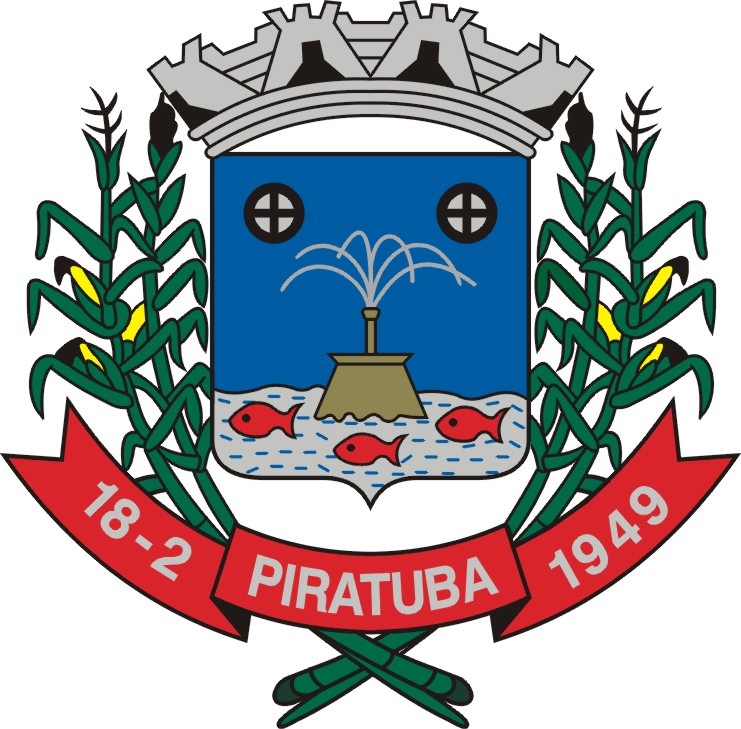
- Flag Coat of arms
- Interactive map of Pirituba
- Country: Brazil
- Region: South
- State: Santa Catarina
- Mesoregion: Oeste Catarinense

Population (2020)
  - Total: 3,745
- Time zone: UTC -3

Piratuba is a municipality in the state of Santa Catarina in the South region of Brazil.

It is known as a popular spa town because of its thermal springs.

== See also ==
- List of municipalities in Santa Catarina
