= Tangerhütte-Land =

Coordinates: 52°26′N 11°48′E

Tangerhütte-Land was a Verwaltungsgemeinschaft ("collective municipality") in the district of Stendal, in Saxony-Anhalt, Germany. The seat of the Verwaltungsgemeinschaft was in Tangerhütte. It was disbanded in May 2010, when the member municipalities merged to form the new town of Tangerhütte.

The Verwaltungsgemeinschaft Tangerhütte-Land consisted of the following municipalities:

1. Bellingen
2. Birkholz
3. Bittkau
4. Cobbel
5. Demker
6. Grieben
7. Hüselitz
8. Jerchel
9. Kehnert
10. Lüderitz
11. Ringfurth
12. Schelldorf
13. Schernebeck
14. Schönwalde
15. Tangerhütte
16. Uchtdorf
17. Uetz
18. Weißewarte
19. Windberge
