= Bindfelde station =

Railway station in Germany

Bindfelde
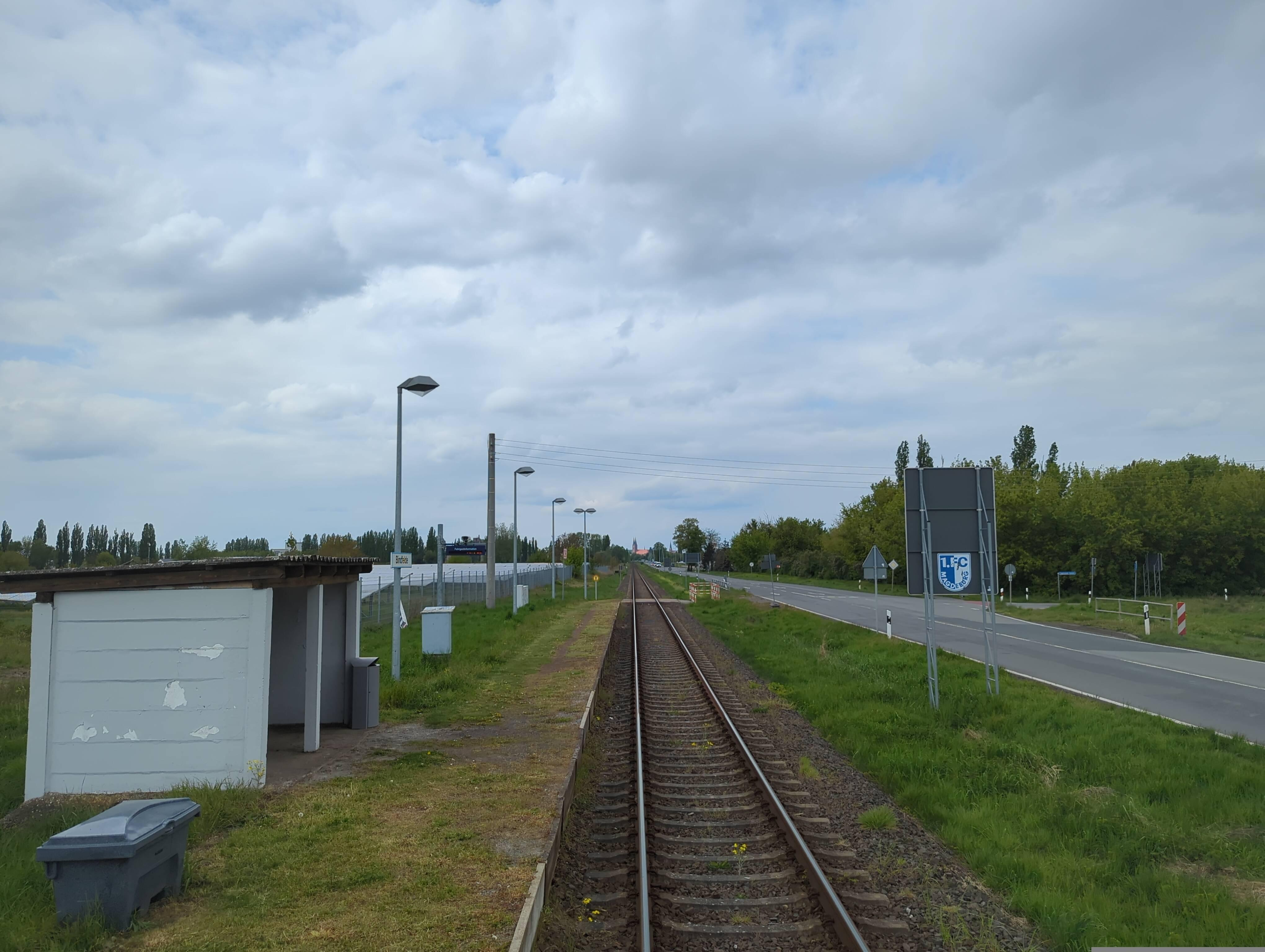
- Bindfelde railway station, 23 April 2024

General information
- Location: Bindfelde, Saxony-Anhalt, Germany
- Coordinates: 52°35′04″N 11°53′54″E
- Owner: DB Netz
- Operator: DB Station&Service
- Lines: Stendal–Tangermünde (KBS 269)
- Platforms: 1

Services
Preceding station	Hanseatische Eisenbahn	Following station
Stendal Vorbahnhof towards Stendal Hbf	RB 33	Miltern towards Tangermünde
Location
- Location within Saxony-Anhalt

Bindfelde (German: Bahnhof Bindfelde) is a railway station in the village of Bindfelde, Saxony-Anhalt, Germany. The station lies on the Stendal-Tangermünde railway and the train services are operated by Hanseatische Eisenbahn.

== Train services ==
The station is served by the following services:

- regional bahn RB 33 Stendal - Tangermünde
