= Demker station =

Railway station in Saxony-Anhalt, Germany

Demker

General information
- Location: Am Bahnhof 1; 39579 Demker; Saxony-Anhalt; Germany
- Coordinates: 52.5176°N 11.8544°E
- System: Bf
- Owner: DB Netz
- Operator: DB Station&Service
- Lines: Magdeburg-Wittenberge railway (KBS 305)
- Platforms: 2 side platforms
- Tracks: 2
- Train operators: S-Bahn Mittelelbe

Other information
- Station code: 1161
- DS100 code: LDK
- IBNR: 8011355
- Category: 6
- Website: www.bahnhof.de

Services
| Preceding station | Mittelelbe S-Bahn | Following station |
|---|---|---|
| Tangerhütte towards Schönebeck-Bad Salzelmen | S 1 | Stendal Hbf towards Wittenberge |
Location
- Location within Saxony-Anhalt Location within Germany Location within Europe

Demker station is a railway station in the municipality of Demker, located in the Stendal district in Saxony-Anhalt, Germany.
