= Miltern station =

Railway station in Miltern, Germany

Miltern

General information
- Location: Miltern, Saxony-Anhalt, Germany
- Coordinates: 52°33′47″N 11°56′12″E
- Owner: DB Netz
- Operator: DB Station&Service
- Lines: Stendal–Tangermünde (KBS 269)
- Platforms: 1

Services
Preceding station	Hanseatische Eisenbahn	Following station
Bindfelde towards Stendal Hbf	RB 33	Tangermünde West towards Tangermünde
Location
- Location within Saxony-Anhalt

Miltern (German: Bahnhof Miltern) is a railway station in the village of Miltern, Saxony-Anhalt, Germany. The station lies on the Stendal-Tangermünde railway and the train services are operated by Hanseatische Eisenbahn.

== Train services ==
The station is served by the following services:

- regional bahn RB 33 Stendal - Tangermünde
