= Tangerhütte =

- Town
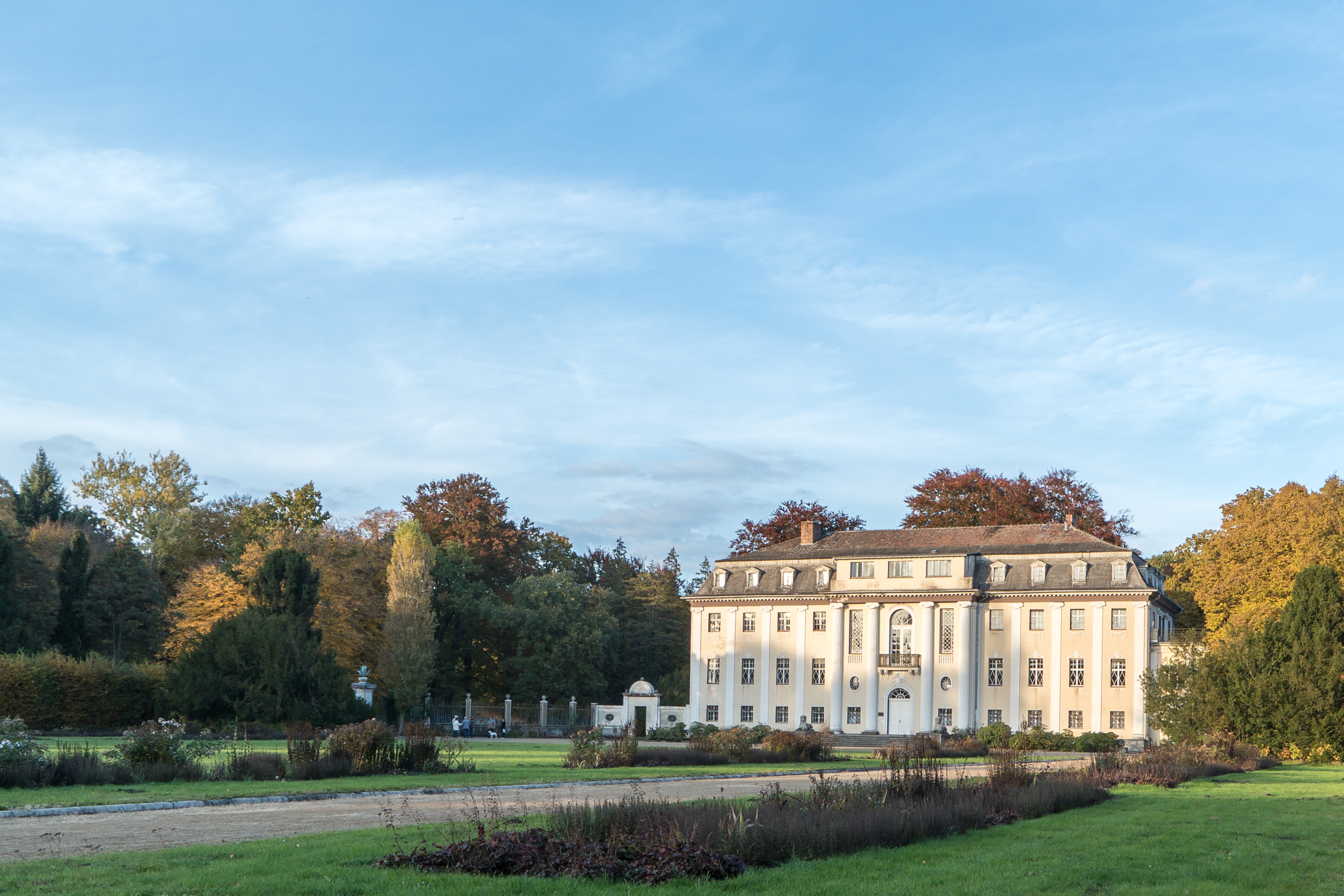
- New Palace

- Coat of arms

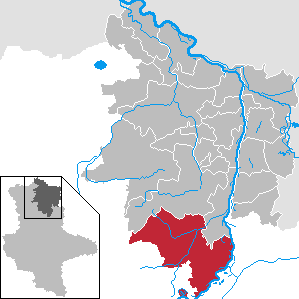
- Location of Tangerhütte within Stendal district
- Interactive map of Tangerhütte
- Location within Germany Location within Saxony-Anhalt
- Coordinates: 52°26′N 11°48′E
- Country: Germany
- State: Saxony-Anhalt
- District: Stendal
- Subdivisions: 17

Government
  - Mayor (2021–28): Andreas Brohm

Area
  - Total: 294.83 km^{2} (113.83 sq mi)
- Elevation: 38 m (125 ft)

Population (2025-12-31)
  - Total: 10,000
  - Density: 34/km^{2} (88/sq mi)
- Time zone: UTC+01:00 (CET)
  - Summer (DST): UTC+02:00 (CEST)
- Postal codes: 39511–39517
- Dialling codes: 03935
- Vehicle registration: SDL
- Website: www.tangerhuette.de

Tangerhütte (German: [taŋɐˈhʏtə]) is a town in the district of Stendal, in Saxony-Anhalt, Germany. It has a population of 10,612 (2020) and is situated on the river Tanger, approximately 20 km south of Stendal.

== Geography ==
The town is situated near the river Tanger which the town was named after. Tangerhütte station is situated on the Magdeburg-Wittenberge railway.

=== Divisions ===
The town Tangerhütte consists of the following 19 Ortschaften or municipal divisions, that were all independent municipalities within the association or Verwaltungsgemeinschaft Tangerhütte-Land until 31 May 2010:

- Bellingen
- Birkholz
- Bittkau
- Cobbel
- Demker
- Grieben
- Hüselitz
- Jerchel
- Kehnert
- Lüderitz
- Ringfurth
- Schelldorf
- Schernebeck
- Schönwalde
- Tangerhütte
- Uchtdorf
- Uetz
- Weißewarte
- Windberge
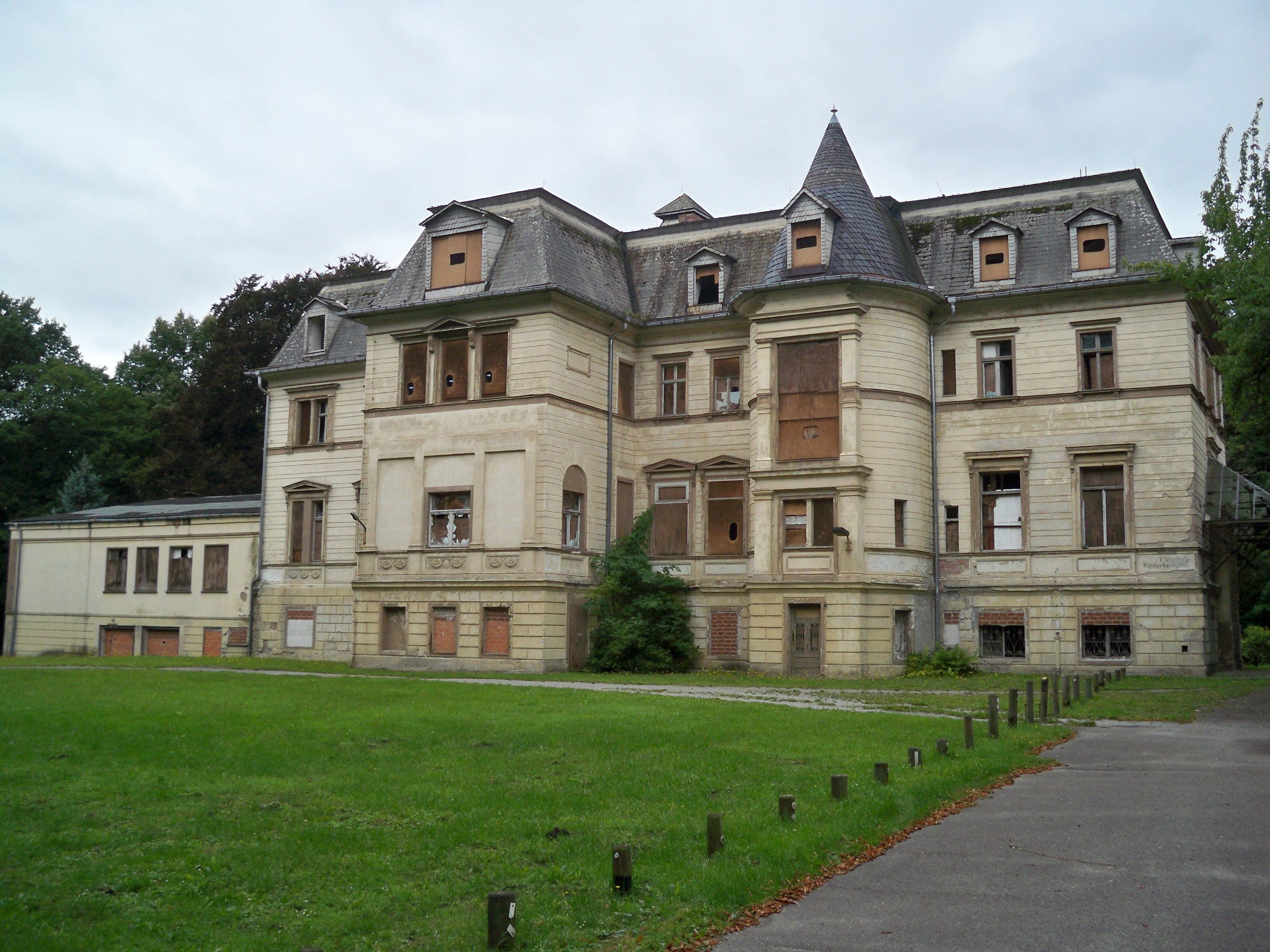
The Old Palace

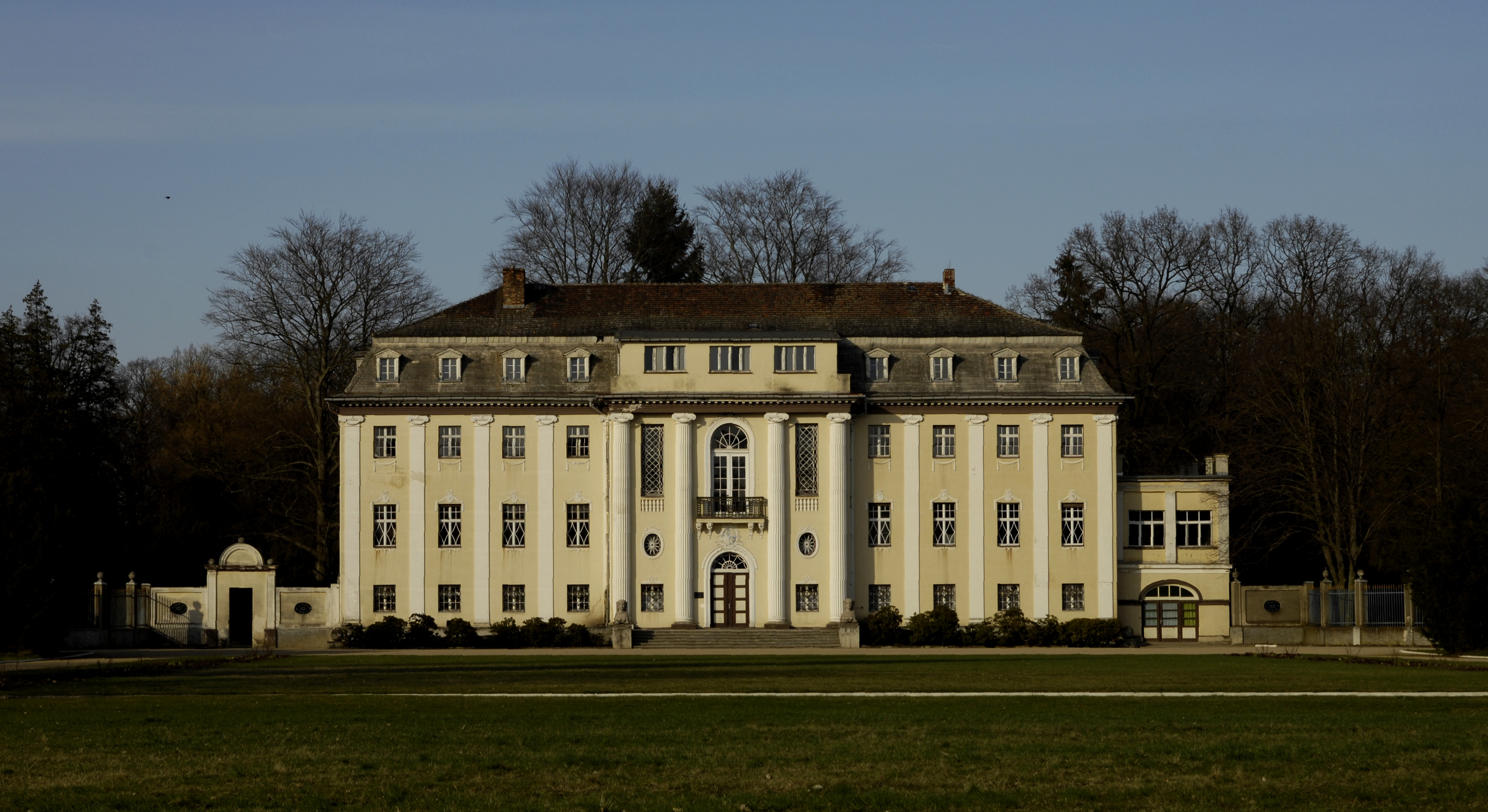
The New Palace

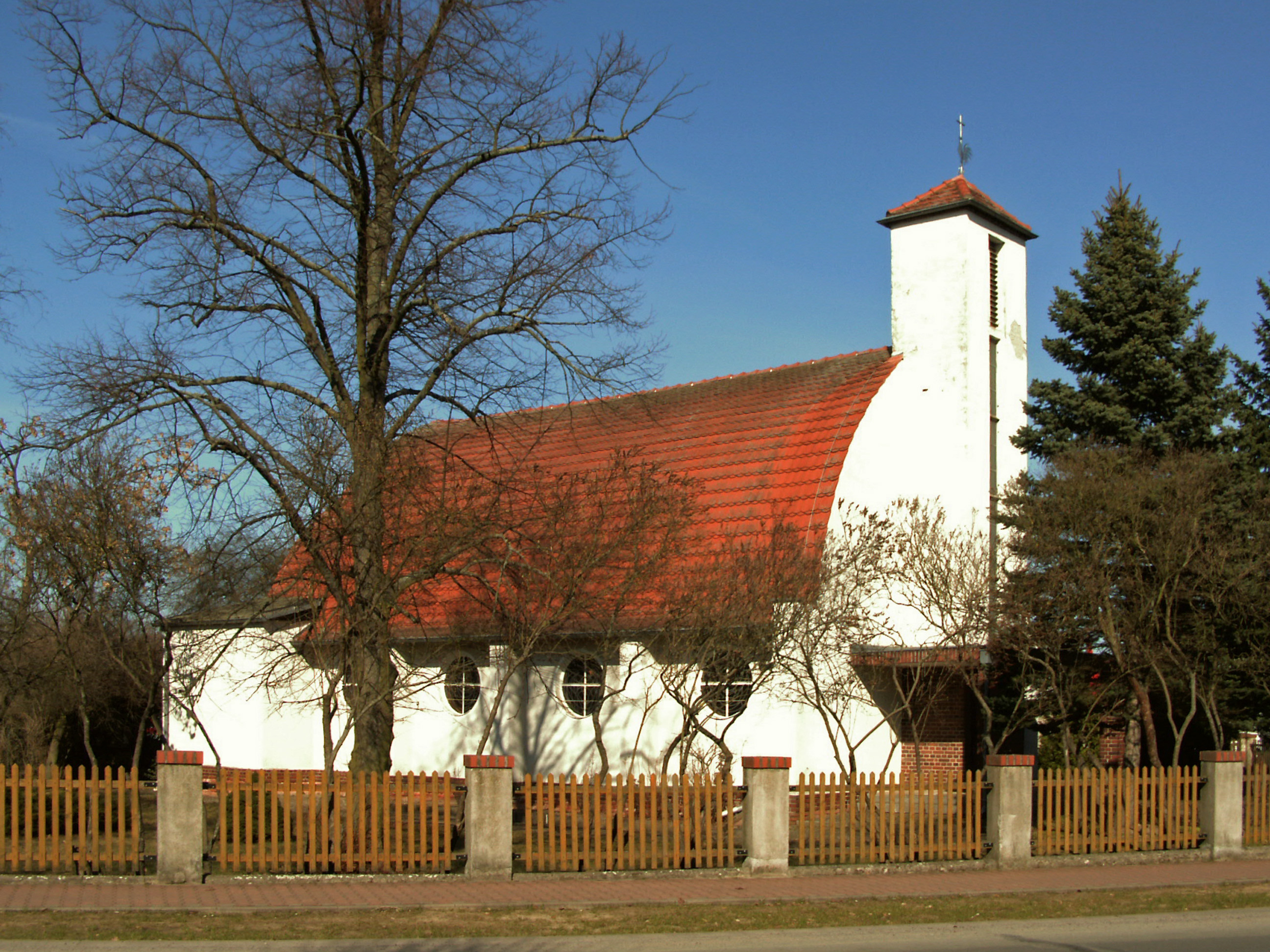
Church of Saint Elisabeth

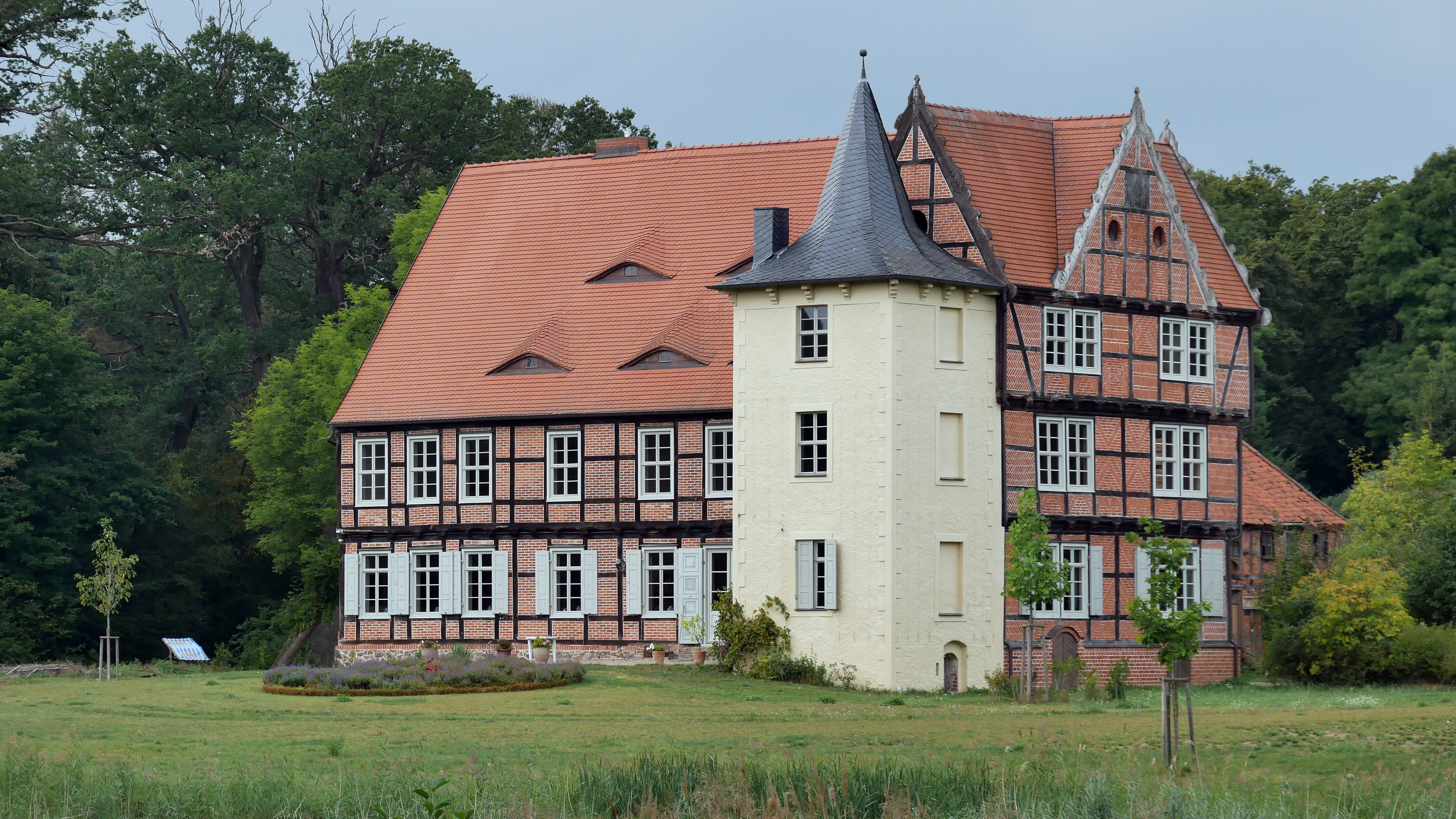
Briest Manor

== History ==
In 1950, the municipality of Briest (Altmark) became part of Tangerhütte. The estate of Briest had been owned by the House of Bismarck since 1345.

In November 2023, Tangerhütte made international headlines when it was proposed that the Anne Frank day care center, would be renamed "World Explorer", a name "without political background". It was criticized particularly in the context of rising antisemitism in 21st-century Germany.

== Twin towns ==
- Hegyvidék, Hungary
- Extertal, Germany
