= Tangerhütte station =

Railway station in Germany

Tangerhütte

General information
- Location: Bismarckstraße 32; 39517 Tangerhütte; Saxony-Anhalt; Germany
- Coordinates: 52.4338°N 11.8099°E
- Owner: DB Netz
- Operator: DB Station&Service
- Lines: Magdeburg-Wittenberge railway (KBS 305)
- Platforms: 2 side platforms
- Tracks: 2
- Train operators: DB Regio Südost; S-Bahn Mittelelbe

Construction
- Accessible: Yes

Other information
- Station code: 6138
- DS100 code: LTH
- IBNR: 8013083
- Category: 6
- Fare zone: marego: 120
- Website: www.bahnhof.de

Services
Preceding station	DB Regio Südost	Following station
Stendal Hbf towards Uelzen	RE 20	Wolmirstedt towards Magdeburg Hbf
Preceding station	Mittelelbe S-Bahn	Following station
Mahlwinkel towards Schönebeck-Bad Salzelmen	S 1	Demker towards Wittenberge
Location
- Location within Saxony-Anhalt

Tangerhütte station is a railway station in the municipality of Tangerhütte, located in the Stendal district in Saxony-Anhalt, Germany.
