= Tangermünde West station =

Railway station in Tangermünde, Germany

Tangermünde West

General information
- Location: Tangermünde, Saxony-Anhalt; Germany
- Coordinates: 52°32′51″N 11°57′37″E
- Owner: DB Netz
- Operator: DB Station&Service
- Lines: Stendal–Tangermünde (KBS 269)
- Platforms: 1

Services
| Preceding station | Hanseatische Eisenbahn | Following station |
|---|---|---|
| Miltern towards Stendal Hbf | RB 33 | Tangermünde Terminus |
Location
- Location within Saxony-Anhalt

Tangermünde West (German: Bahnhof Tangermünde West) is a railway station in the town of Tangermünde, Saxony-Anhalt, Germany. The station lies on the Stendal-Tangermünde railway and the train services are operated by Hanseatische Eisenbahn.

== Train services ==
The station is served by the following services:

- regional bahn RB 33 Stendal - Tangermünde
