= Bellingen =

Bellingen may refer to:

- Bellingen, Rhineland-Palatinate, a municipality in the district Westerwaldkreis, in Rhineland-Palatinate, Germany
- Bellingen, Saxony-Anhalt, a municipality in the district of Stendal, in Saxony-Anhalt, Germany
- Bad Bellingen, a municipality in the district of Lörrach, in Baden-Württemberg, Germany
- Bellingen, New South Wales, a town in Australia
- Bellingen Shire, New South Wales, a local government area which includes the town
- Bellingen, Belgium, a village in the municipality of Pepingen, Belgium
