= Birkholz (disambiguation) =

Birkholz is a place in Saxony-Anhalt, Germany.

Birkholz may also refer to:

- Borów, Lubusz Voivodeship, Poland, formerly known as Birkholz
- Patricia L. Birkholz (1944–2018), American politician
- Anthony Birkholz, a filmmaker whose 2017 death was connected to Casey William Hardison
