= Jerchel =

Jerchel may refer to the following places in Saxony-Anhalt, Germany:

- Jerchel, Gardelegen
- Jerchel, Stendal
