= Stendal Vorbahnhof station =

Railway station in Stendal, Germany

Stendal Vorbf
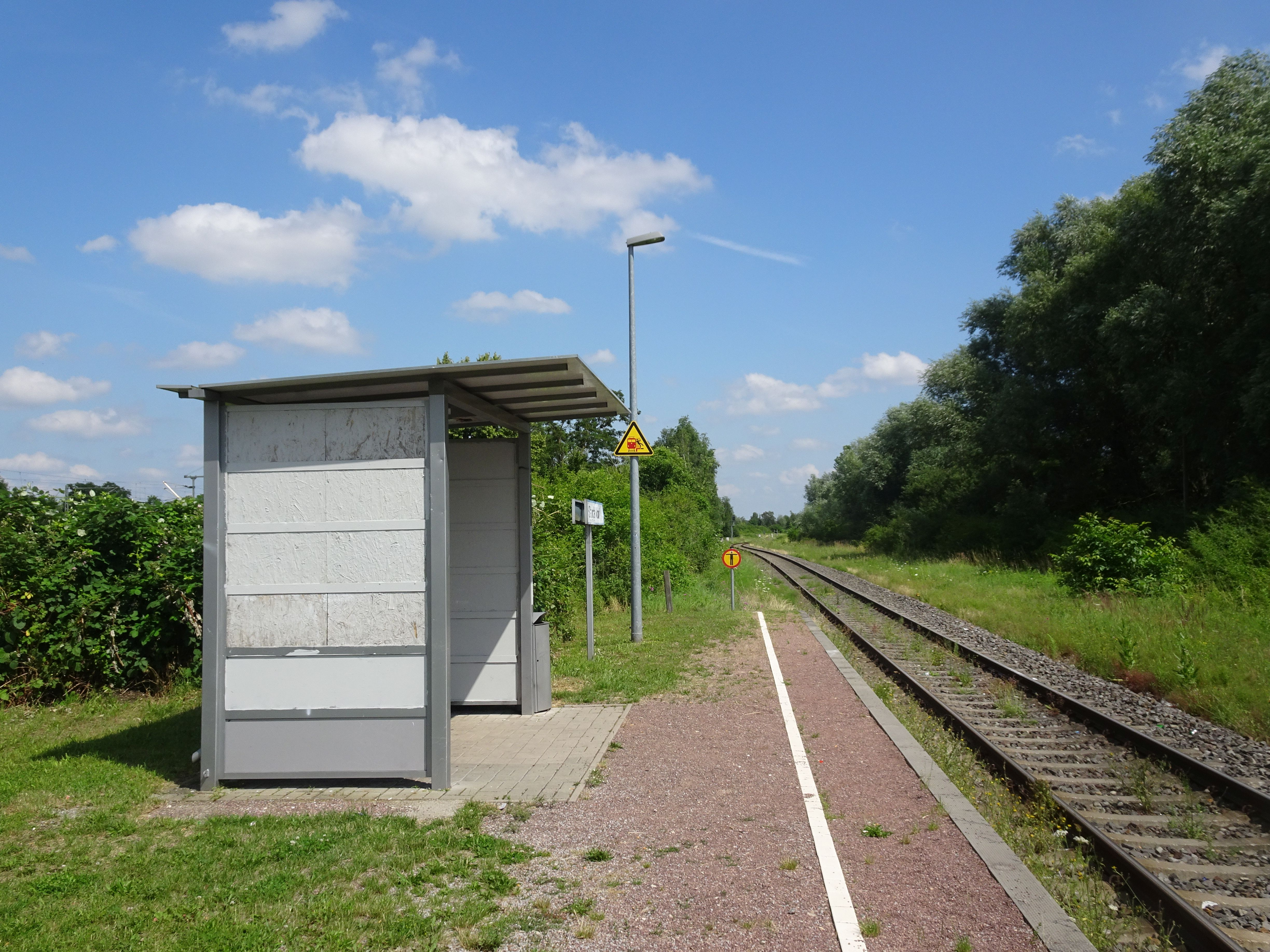

General information
- Location: Stendal, Saxony-Anhalt, Germany
- Coordinates: 52°35′43″N 11°52′18″E
- Owner: DB Netz
- Operator: DB Station&Service
- Lines: Stendal-Tangermünde railway (KBS 269)
- Platforms: 1

Services
Preceding station	Hanseatische Eisenbahn	Following station
Stendal Hbf Terminus	RB 33	Bindfelde towards Tangermünde
Location
- Location within Saxony-Anhalt

Stendal Vorbahnhof (German: Stendal Vorbahnhof) is a railway station in the town of Stendal, Saxony-Anhalt, Germany. The station lies on the Stendal-Tangermünde railway and the train services are operated by Hanseatische Eisenbahn.

== Train services ==
The station is served by the following services:

- regional bahn RB 33 Stendal - Tangermünde
