= Hans-Joachim Birkner =

German fighter ace and Knight's Cross recipient (1921–1944)

- Birkner as Leutnant
- Born: 22 October 1921; Schönwalde, Germany
- Died: 14 December 1944 (aged 23); Krakau, Poland
- Military career
- Allegiance: Nazi Germany
- Branch: Luftwaffe
- Service years: 1940–1944
- Rank: Leutnant (second lieutenant)
- Unit: JG 52
- Conflicts: World War II: Eastern Front
- Awards: Knight's Cross of the Iron Cross

Hans-Joachim Birkner (22 October 1921 – 14 December 1944) was a German Luftwaffe military aviator during World War II, a fighter ace credited with 117 aerial victories—that is, 117 aerial combat encounters resulting in the destruction of the enemy aircraft—claimed in 284 combat missions, becoming an "ace-in-a-day" on three separate occasions.

Born in Schönwalde, Birkner was trained as a fighter pilot and posted to Jagdgeschwader 52 (JG 52–52nd Fighter Wing) in 1943. Fighting on the Eastern Front, he claimed his first aerial victory on 1 October 1943. Following his 98th aerial victory, Birkner was awarded the Knight's Cross of the Iron Cross on 27 July 1944. On 1 October, he was appointed Staffelkapitän (squadron leader) of 9. Staffel (9th squadron) of JG 52. Two weeks later, he claimed his 100th aerial victory. Birkner was killed in a flight accident on 14 December at an airfield at Kraków.

== Early life and career ==
Birkner was born on 22 October 1921 at Schönwalde in East Prussia, at the time part of the Weimar Republic's Free State of Prussia. In the summer of 1943, Feldwebel Birkner had completed flight training and was posted to 9. Staffel (9th squadron) of Jagdgeschwader 52 (JG 52–52nd Fighter Wing), a squadron of III. Gruppe (3rd group). (Note: Flight training in the Luftwaffe progressed through the levels A1, A2 and B1, B2, referred to as A/B flight training. A training included theoretical and practical training in aerobatics, navigation, long-distance flights and dead-stick landings. The B courses included high-altitude flights, instrument flights, night landings, and training to handle the aircraft in difficult situations.) (Note: For an explanation of Luftwaffe unit designations see Organization of the Luftwaffe during World War II.) At the time, III. Gruppe was officially commanded by Major Günther Rall, occasionally replaced by either Oberleutnant Walter Krupinski on Oberleutnant Josef Haiböck.

== World War II ==
On Friday 1 September 1939 German forces had invaded Poland which marked the beginning of World War II, and in June 1941, Germany had invaded the Soviet Union which created the Eastern Front. In late September 1943, III. Gruppe of JG 52 was equipped with the Messerschmitt Bf 109 G and fought in the Battle of the Caucasus and was based at Zaporizhia. In October, III. Gruppe flew combat missions over the right flank of the 1st Panzer Army and the left flank of 6th Army during the Battle of the Dnieper.

=== Eastern Front ===
Karaya emblem

Birkner claimed his first aerial victory on 1 October 1943 over a P-39 Airacobra in combat south-southwest of Bolschoj Tokmak. That day, III. Gruppe had claimed 17 aerial victories in an encounter with Ilyushin Il-2 ground-attack aircraft and their fighter escort. Birkner claimed his second aerial victory on 4 October over a Lavochkin-Gorbunov-Gudkov LaGG-3. The following day he shot down a Lend-Lease Douglas A-20 Havoc bomber also referred to as a "Boston". On 9 October, he claimed another LaGG-3 fighter shot down followed by two further claims over LaGG-3 fighters on 11 October. On 19 October, III. Gruppe moved to an airfield at Kirovograd, present-day Kropyvnytskyi where they stayed until 31 October. Here Birkner claimed a LaGG-3 fighter on 21 October, two LaGG-3 fighters on 24 October, a Bell P-39 Airacobra fighter and another LaGG-3 fighter on 25 October, and an Il-2 ground-attack aircraft and another P-39 fighter on 29 October.

On 1 November, III. Gruppe was moved to Apostolove fighting in the combat area between Nikopol and Zaporizhzhia. Adverse whether conditions rendered the airfield unusable and the Gruppe temporarily used an airfield near Kirovograd from 12 to 20 November. By the end of 1943, Birkner had claimed 24 aerial victories in total. Over the next few months Birkner often flew as Rottenflieger (wing man) to the high scoring aces Günther Rall and Erich Hartmann, claiming many of his victories whilst flying with them. On 3 January 1944, Birkner claimed two LaGG-3 fighters shot down, taking his total to 26 aerial victories. The Gruppe moved to an airfield at Mala Vyska on 7 January where they stayed for three days.

On 10 January, the Gruppe moved to an airfield at Novokrasne located approximately 40 kilometers (25 miles) south-southwest of Novoukrainka. While based at Novokrasne, elements of III. Gruppe also operated from Ivanhorod (11 to 13 January), at Velyka Lepetykha (3 to 22 February), and Mykolaiv (2 to 23 February). Five days later, Birkner claimed five P-39 fighters shot down near Kirovograd, one of which was not confirmed. In April, he claimed a further 29 victories, including six in one day on 19 April making him an "ace-in-a-day" for the first time, taking his total to 60 aerial victories. Birkner received the Honor Goblet of the Luftwaffe (Ehrenpokal der Luftwaffe) on 24 April. In May, he claimed 17 victories, including another "ace-in-a-day" achievement on 30 May.

III. Gruppe relocated to Roman on 1 June. On 3 June, Birkner claimed three Lavochkin aircraft shot down north of Iași. On 24 June, the United States Army Air Forces' (USAAF) Fifteenth Air Force attacked various targets in Romania with 377 bombers. A fraction of this attack force, consisting of 135 Consolidated B-24 Liberator and Lockheed P-38 Lightning and North American P-51 Mustang fighters, headed for the Ploiești oilfields. Defending against this attack, Birkner claimed a P-51 shot down, his 91st aerial victory. Birkner was awarded the Knight's Cross of the Iron Cross (Ritterkreuz des Eisernen Kreuzes) on 27 July 1944 for 98 victories.

=== Squadron leader and death ===
On 1 October 1944, Birkner was appointed Staffelkapitän (squadron leader) of 9. Staffel of JG 52. He thus succeeded Oberleutnant Hartmann who was transferred. At the time of this assignment, III. Gruppe was based in Warzyn Pierwszy, Poland. The airfield was located approximately 15 kilometers (9.3 miles) west of Jędrzejów. The Gruppe was under the command of Hauptmann Wilhelm Batz and Oberstleutnant Hermann Graf had just taken over the JG 52 as Geschwaderkommodore (wing commander). On 8 October, III. Gruppe moved to an airfield near Lobellen, present-day Tushino located approximately 30 kilometers (19 miles) east-southeast of Tilsit, present-day Sovetsk, on the south bank of the Memel, present day Neman River. Here, Birkner claimed an Il-2 ground-attack aircraft shot down on 14 October, his 100th aerial victory. He was the 95th Luftwaffe pilot to achieve the century mark. Two days later on 16 October, he became an "ace-in-a-day" for the second time, claiming four LaGG fighters and a single Il-2 ground-attack aircraft.

The Gruppe moved to an airfield named Hasenfeld, also referred to as Jürgenfelde, located approximately 16 kilometers (9.9 miles) south of Insterburg, present-day Chernyakhovsk, on 20 October where they stayed until 7 November. Here Birkner claimed five further aerial victories over LaGG fighters, one on 23 October, and two each on 25 and 27 October respectively. On 7 November, III. Gruppe again moved to the airfield at Warzyn Pierwszy. On 12 December, the Gruppe relocated to Krakau, present-day Kraków. Two days later, Birkner was killed in a flying accident when his Bf 109 G-14/U4 (Werknummer 510531—factory number) suffered engine failure during the landing approach at Krakau. Following his death, command of 9. Staffel was passed on to Hauptmann Otto-Karl Klemenz.

== Summary of career ==
=== Aerial victory claims ===
According to US historian David T. Zabecki, Birkner was credited with 117 aerial victories. Spick also lists Birkner with 117 aerial victories claimed in 284 combat missions, and a mission-to-claim ratio of 2.42. His victories were recorded over the Eastern Front and included one USAAF P-51 fighter. Included in his total are at least 15 Ilyushin Il-2 Sturmoviks. Mathews and Foreman, authors of Luftwaffe Aces – Biographies and Victory Claims, researched the German Federal Archives and state that Birkner was credited with 117 aerial victories. This figure includes 116 aerial victories on the Eastern Front and one over the Western Allies.

Victory claims were logged to a map-reference (PQ = Planquadrat), for example "PQ 34 Ost 58842". The Luftwaffe grid map (Jägermeldenetz) covered all of Europe, western Russia and North Africa and was composed of rectangles measuring 15 minutes of latitude by 30 minutes of longitude, an area of about 360 square miles (930 km^{2}). These sectors were then subdivided into 36 smaller units to give a location area 3 km × 4 km (1.9 mi × 2.5 mi) in size.

Chronicle of aerial victories
This and the ♠ (Ace of spades) indicates those aerial victories which made Birkner an "ace-in-a-day", a term which designates a fighter pilot who has shot down five or more airplanes in a single day. This and the – (dash) indicates unconfirmed aerial victory claims for which Birkner did not receive credit. This and the ? (question mark) indicates information discrepancies listed by Barbas, Prien, Stemmer, Rodeike, Bock, Mathews and Foreman.
Claim	Date	Time	Type	Location	Claim	Date	Time	Type	Location
– 9. Staffel of Jagdgeschwader 52 – Eastern Front – 4 February – 31 December 1943
1	1 October 1943	10:25	P-39	PQ 34 Ost 58842; 20 km (12 mi) south-southwest of Bolschoj Tokmak	13	29 October 1943	12:55	P-39? (Note: According to Mathews and Foreman claimed as an Ilyushin Il-2.)	PQ 34 Ost 39362, northwest of Mishorin-Rog; 10 km (6.2 mi) east of Mironovka
2	4 October 1943	09:07	LaGG-3	PQ 34 Ost 58191; 15 km (9.3 mi) east-southeast of Zaporizhia	14	27 November 1943	09:05	LaGG-3	PQ 34 Ost 49784; 55 km (34 mi) north-northwest of Nikopol
3	5 October 1943	08:58	Boston	PQ 34 Ost 59582; 25 km (16 mi) south-southeast of Dnepropetrovsk	15	27 November 1943	14:20	LaGG-3	PQ 34 Ost 47782; 55 km (34 mi) southwest of Bilozirka
4	9 October 1943	13:44	LaGG-3	PQ 34 Ost 59732; 40 km (25 mi) southeast of Dnepropetrovsk	16	28 November 1943	08:45	LaGG-3	PQ 34 Ost 48783; 55 km (34 mi) southwest of Bilozirka
5	11 October 1943	07:30	LaGG-3	PQ 34 Ost 58182, east of Zaporizhia; 5 km (3.1 mi) southeast of Zaporizhia	17	28 November 1943	13:47	LaGG-3	PQ 34 Ost 48782; 55 km (34 mi) southwest of Bilozirka
6	11 October 1943	07:31	LaGG-3	PQ 34 Ost 58182, east of Zaporizhia; 5 km (3.1 mi) southeast of Zaporizhia	18	28 November 1943	14:35	Il-2 m.H. (Note: The "m.H." refers to an Ilyushin Il-2 with rear gunner (mit Heckschütze).)	PQ 34 Ost 48472; 15 km (9.3 mi) east of Nikopol
7	21 October 1943	07:40	LaGG-3	PQ 34 Ost 39481 vicinity of Pjatichatki	19	15 December 1943	12:00	P-39	northeast of Novgorodka
8	24 October 1943	09:35	LaGG-3	PQ 34 Ost 58392; 30 km (19 mi) southeast of Zaporizhia	20	17 December 1943	13:52	P-39	south of Novgorodka
9	24 October 1943	09:36	LaGG-3	PQ 34 Ost 58391; 30 km (19 mi) southeast of Zaporizhia	21	19 December 1943	12:07	LaGG-3	PQ 34 Ost 48654; 20 km (12 mi) northwest of Bilozirka
10	25 October 1943	10:05	P-39	PQ 34 Ost 39462; 40 km (25 mi) east-southeast of Mironovka	22	19 December 1943	14:20	LaGG-3	north of Bolschoj Tokmak
11	25 October 1943	10:08	LaGG-3	PQ 34 Ost 39483 vicinity of Pjatichatki	23	19 December 1943	14:22	LaGG-3	west of Malaya-Tomatshka
12	29 October 1943	06:07	Il-2	PQ 34 Ost 29524 vicinity of Alekandrovka	24	20 December 1943	11:56	LaGG-3	south-southeast of Novo-Nikolayevka
– 9. Staffel of Jagdgeschwader 52 – Eastern Front – 1 January – 14 December 1944
25	3 January 1944	12:05	LaGG	PQ 34 Ost 38623; 20 km (12 mi) south of Apostolove	70♠	30 May 1944	08:50	LaGG	PQ 24 Ost 78599; 15 km (9.3 mi) northwest of Iași
26	3 January 1944	12:25	LaGG	PQ 34 Ost 48114; 45 km (28 mi) north-northwest of Nikopol	71♠	30 May 1944	14:40	P-39	PQ 78647; 10 km (6.2 mi) south of Tudora
27	9 January 1944	14:07	P-39	PQ 34 Ost 29374; 15 km (9.3 mi) west of Kirovohrad	72♠	30 May 1944	14:43	P-39	PQ 78652; 15 km (9.3 mi) southeast of Tudora
28	15 January 1944	08:54	P-39	PQ 34 Ost 19491; 25 km (16 mi) west of Kirovohrad	73♠	30 May 1944	19:10	P-39	PQ 78643; 10 km (6.2 mi) south of Tudora
29	15 January 1944	09:25	P-39	PQ 34 Ost 19493; 25 km (16 mi) west of Kirovohrad	74♠	30 May 1944	19:13	P-39	PQ 78812; 10 km (6.2 mi) south of Iași
30	15 January 1944	12:15	P-39	PQ 34 Ost 19462; 25 km (16 mi) west-northwest of Kirovohrad	75	31 May 1944	10:31	LaGG	PQ 78679; 15 km (9.3 mi) north of Iași
31	15 January 1944	12:21	P-39	PQ 34 Ost 29341; 15 km (9.3 mi) northwest of Kirovohrad	76	31 May 1944	10:36	LaGG	PQ 78679; 15 km (9.3 mi) north of Iași
— ? (Note: This unconfirmed claim is not listed by Barbas.)	15 January 1944	—	P-39		77	31 May 1944	16:25	P-39	PQ 78676; 15 km (9.3 mi) north of Iași
32	15 April 1944	06:40	LaGG	PQ 34 Ost 35262 vicinity of Balaklava; 10 km (6.2 mi) south of Sevastopol	78	3 June 1944	14:10	LaGG	PQ 78733; 15 km (9.3 mi) northwest of Iași
33	15 April 1944	06:43	LaGG	PQ 35254; 25 km (16 mi) west-southwest of Simferopol	79	3 June 1944	14:12	LaGG	PQ 78733; 15 km (9.3 mi) northwest of Iași
34	15 April 1944	10:30	Il-2	PQ 35322; Black Sea, 25 km (16 mi) northwest of Sevastopol	80	3 June 1944	14:14	LaGG	PQ 78811; 10 km (6.2 mi) south of Iași
35	15 April 1944	10:32	LaGG	PQ 35242; Black Sea, 25 km (16 mi) south of Saky	81	4 June 1944	16:15	Il-2 m.H.	PQ 78589; 25 km (16 mi) northwest of Iași
36	16 April 1944	13:03	Il-2	PQ 35361; Black Sea, 10 km (6.2 mi) west of Sevastopol	82	4 June 1944	16:25	P-39	PQ 78723; 20 km (12 mi) west-northwest of Iași
37	16 April 1944	13:08	LaGG	PQ 35132; Black Sea, 25 km (16 mi) south of Euparorja	83	4 June 1944	16:40	P-39	PQ 78559; 25 km (16 mi) west-southwest of Tudora
38	18 April 1944	10:38	LaGG	PQ 35823; Black Sea, 45 km (28 mi) southeast of Sevastopol	84	4 June 1944	17:15	P-39	PQ 78595; 15 km (9.3 mi) northwest of Iași
39	18 April 1944	15:50	LaGG	PQ 35442 vicinity of Sevastopol	85	6 June 1944	17:24	P-39	PQ 78593; 15 km (9.3 mi) northwest of Iași
40	18 April 1944	16:05	LaGG	PQ 35454; 15 km (9.3 mi) east of Sevastopol	86	8 June 1944	12:19	Pe-2?	PQ 78687
41	18 April 1944	16:17	Il-2	vicinity of Sevastopol; 10 km (6.2 mi) south of Sevastopol	87	8 June 1944	12:21	Pe-2?	PQ 75685
42♠	19 April 1944	10:40	LaGG	PQ 35471; 10 km (6.2 mi) south of Sevastopol	88	8 June 1944	15:10	LaGG	PQ 78586; 25 km (16 mi) northwest of Iași
43♠	19 April 1944	10:43	LaGG	PQ 35472; 10 km (6.2 mi) south of Sevastopol	89	8 June 1944	15:30	LaGG	PQ 6899
44♠	19 April 1944	10:44	LaGG	vicinity of Sevastopol; 10 km (6.2 mi) south of Sevastopol	— ? (Note: According to Barbas, this unconfirmed claim is listed as his 90th aerial victory.)	8 June 1944	—	Il-2	
45♠	19 April 1944	15:35	LaGG	vicinity of Sevastopol; 10 km (6.2 mi) south of Sevastopol	90	14 June 1944	17:29	LaGG	PQ 78547; 45 km (28 mi) west-northwest of Iași
46♠	19 April 1944	15:50	LaGG	vicinity of Balaklava; Black Sea, 10 km (6.2 mi) south of Sevastopol	91	24 June 1944	09:56	P-51	PQ 65133; Black Sea, south of Cape Takyl
47♠	19 April 1944	15:51	LaGG	vicinity of Balaklava; Black Sea, 10 km (6.2 mi) south of Sevastopol	92	1 July 1944	10:57	LaGG	PQ 85841; Black Sea, southwest of Ol'ginka
48	22 April 1944	09:38	Boston	PQ 25481; 20 km (12 mi) west of Yelnya	93	9 July 1944	09:57	Il-2 m.H.	PQ 45462
49	22 April 1944	13:40	LaGG	PQ 35712; Black Sea, 55 km (34 mi) southwest of Sevastopol	94	20 July 1944	12:15	LaGG	PQ 41569; 45 km (28 mi) north-northwest of Busk
50	23 April 1944	08:00	Pe-2	PQ 35331; Black Sea, 15 km (9.3 mi) northwest of Sevastopol	95	20 July 1944	16:38	P-39	PQ 40141 vicinity of Lviv
51	23 April 1944	10:50	Il-2	PQ 35481; 15 km (9.3 mi) southeast of Sevastopol	96	21 July 1944	16:50	LaGG	PQ 30262; 10 km (6.2 mi) west of Lviv
52	23 April 1944	11:20	LaGG	vicinity of Belbek	97	21 July 1944	16:55	LaGG	PQ 30261; 10 km (6.2 mi) west of Lviv
53	24 April 1944	14:30	LaGG	vicinity of Sevastopol; 10 km (6.2 mi) south of Sevastopol	98	21 July 1944	17:22	Il-2 m.H.	PQ 40154; 10 km (6.2 mi) east of Lviv
54	24 April 1944	15:35	Il-2	PQ 35391; Black Sea, southwest of Sevastopol	99	14 October 1944	15:35	Il-2 m.H.	PQ 16316; 30 km (19 mi) northwest of Timișoara
55	25 April 1944	07:33	LaGG	vicinity of Balaklava; Black Sea, 10 km (6.2 mi) south of Sevastopol	100♠	16 October 1944	09:09	LaGG	PQ 26767; 20 km (12 mi) southwest of Prahovo
56	25 April 1944	07:45	LaGG	PQ 35332; Black Sea, 15 km (9.3 mi) northwest of Sevastopol	101♠	16 October 1944	09:10	LaGG	PQ 26733; 15 km (9.3 mi) west of Prahovo
57	25 April 1944	07:58	P-39	PQ 35454; 15 km (9.3 mi) east of Sevastopol	102♠	16 October 1944	14:15	LaGG	PQ 25468; 15 km (9.3 mi) east of Turnu Severin
58	27 April 1944	10:55	LaGG	north of Balaklava; 10 km (6.2 mi) south of Sevastopol	103♠	16 October 1944	14:32	LaGG	PQ 25455; Turnu Severin
59	27 April 1944	17:55	P-39	north of Balaklava; 10 km (6.2 mi) south of Sevastopol	104♠	16 October 1944	16:00	Il-2 m.H.	PQ 35517; 30 km (19 mi) southeast of Turnu Severin
60	27 April 1944	18:10	P-39	PQ 35452; 15 km (9.3 mi) east of Sevastopol	105	17 October 1944	15:00	Pe-2	PQ 25356; Turnu Severin
61	21 May 1944	09:46	P-39	PQ 78562; 15 km (9.3 mi) southwest of Tudora	106	18 October 1944	09:40	LaGG	PQ 25632; 25 km (16 mi) southeast of Turnu Severin
62	22 May 1944	15:40	LaGG	PQ 78792; 15 km (9.3 mi) southwest of Iași	107	18 October 1944	09:42	Il-2 m.H.	PQ 25637; 25 km (16 mi) southeast of Turnu Severin
63	23 May 1944	16:02	LaGG	PQ 68791; 10 km (6.2 mi) north of Piatra Neamț	108	18 October 1944	09:43	LaGG	PQ 25639; 25 km (16 mi) southeast of Turnu Severin
64	23 May 1944	16:07	LaGG	PQ 67183; 20 km (12 mi) southwest of Piatra Neamț	109	23 October 1944	14:00	LaGG	PQ 25314; 20 km (12 mi) west of Orșova
65	28 May 1944	08:20	P-39	PQ 78811; 10 km (6.2 mi) south of Iași	110	25 October 1944	15:00	LaGG	PQ 25586; 25 km (16 mi) east-southeast of Majdanpek
66	28 May 1944	08:55	LaGG	PQ 78715; 25 km (16 mi) northeast of Iași	111	25 October 1944	15:02	LaGG	PQ 25599; 25 km (16 mi) west-northwest of Prahovo
67	28 May 1944	12:20	P-39	PQ 78511; 40 km (25 mi) west of Tudora	112	27 October 1944	14:15	LaGG	PQ 25529; 25 km (16 mi) northeast of Majdanpek
68	28 May 1944	17:40	P-39	PQ 68833 north of Târgu Frumos	113	27 October 1944	14:23	LaGG	PQ 25533; 30 km (19 mi) southwest of Turnu Severin
69	29 May 1944	13:25	P-39	PQ 78543; 45 km (28 mi) west-northwest of Iași					
According to Mathews and Foreman, aerial victories 114 to 117 were not documented.
114	14 December 1944	—	unknown		116	14 December 1944	—	unknown	
115	14 December 1944	—	unknown						

=== Awards ===
- Iron Cross (1939) 2nd and 1st Class
- Honour Goblet of the Luftwaffe on 24 April 1944 as Fahnenjunker-Feldwebel and pilot
- German Cross in Gold on 20 March 1944 as Fahnenjunker-Feldwebel in the 9./Jagdgeschwader 52
- Knight's Cross of the Iron Cross on 27 July 1944 as Fahnenjunker-Feldwebel and pilot in the 9./Jagdgeschwader 52 (Note: According to Scherzer as pilot in the III./Jagdgeschwader 52.)
