= Colbitz =

- Municipality
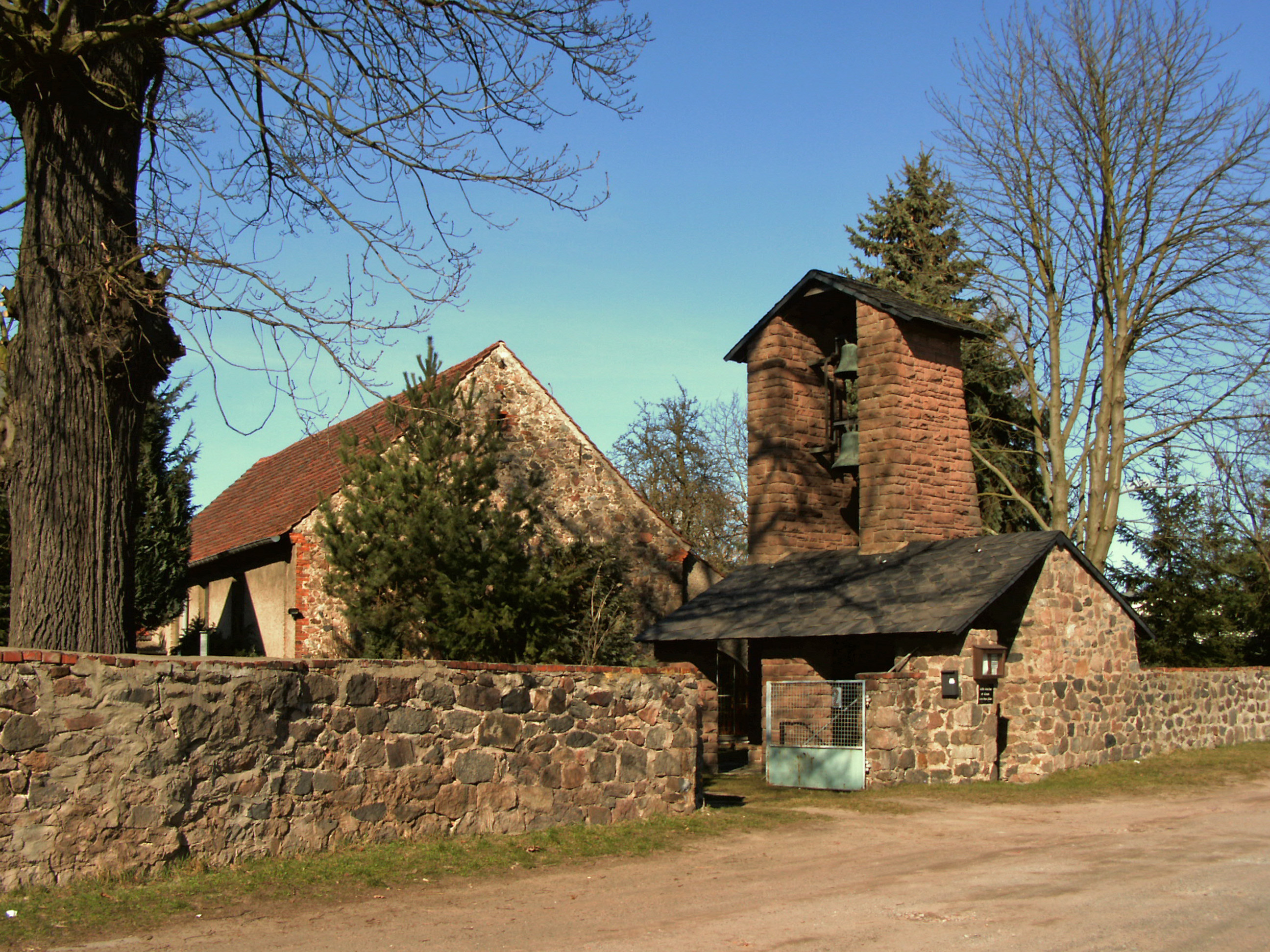
- Church of Saint Nicholas

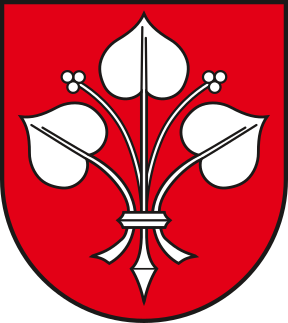
- Coat of arms

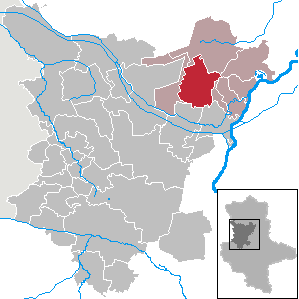
- Location of Colbitz within Börde district
- Interactive map of Colbitz
- Location within Germany Location within Saxony-Anhalt
- Coordinates: 52°19′N 11°37′E
- Country: Germany
- State: Saxony-Anhalt
- District: Börde
- Municipal assoc.: Elbe-Heide
- Subdivisions: 4

Government
  - Mayor (2021–28): Ralf Ganzer

Area
  - Total: 71.85 km^{2} (27.74 sq mi)
- Elevation: 67 m (220 ft)

Population (2025-12-31)
  - Total: 3,420
  - Density: 47.6/km^{2} (123/sq mi)
- Time zone: UTC+01:00 (CET)
  - Summer (DST): UTC+02:00 (CEST)
- Postal codes: 39326
- Dialling codes: 039207
- Vehicle registration: BK
- Website: www.gemeinde-colbitz.de

Colbitz is a municipality in the Börde district in Saxony-Anhalt, Germany.

Colbitz is well known for its "Colbitzer" beer and the Colbitz-Letzlinger Heide. The Colbitz-Letzlinger Heide is found in the northern area of Colbitz, but most parts of the heath landscape are used by the Bundeswehr - the German Army.
