= Elbe-Heide =

Association of municipalities in Saxony-Anhalt

- Verbandsgemeinde
- Map of Börde highlighting Elbe-Heide
- Interactive map of Elbe-Heide
- Location within Germany Location within Saxony-Anhalt
- Coordinates: 52°19′N 11°46′E
- Country: Germany
- State: Saxony-Anhalt
- District: Börde
- Seat: Rogätz
- Subdivisions: 7 municipalities

Area
  - Total: 369.44 km^{2} (142.64 sq mi)

Population (2025-12-31)
  - Total: 13,403
  - Density: 36.279/km^{2} (93.963/sq mi)
- Time zone: UTC+01:00 (CET)
  - Summer (DST): UTC+02:00 (CEST)
- Website: www.elbe-heide.de

Elbe-Heide is a Verbandsgemeinde ("collective municipality") in the Börde district, in Saxony-Anhalt, Germany. Before 1 January 2010, it was a Verwaltungsgemeinschaft ("municipal association"). It is situated on the left bank of the Elbe, northwest of Burg bei Magdeburg. The seat of the Verbandsgemeinde is in Rogätz.

The Verbandsgemeinde Elbe-Heide consists of the following municipalities:

1. Angern
2. Burgstall
3. Colbitz
4. Loitsche-Heinrichsberg
5. Rogätz
6. Westheide
7. Zielitz
