= Zielitz =

- Municipality
- Coat of arms

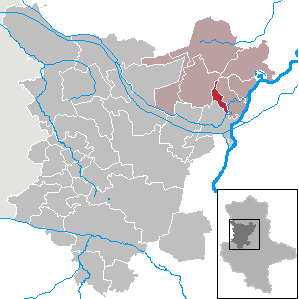
- Location of Zielitz within Börde district
- Interactive map of Zielitz
- Location within Germany Location within Saxony-Anhalt
- Coordinates: 52°17′N 11°41′E
- Country: Germany
- State: Saxony-Anhalt
- District: Börde
- Municipal assoc.: Elbe-Heide

Government
  - Mayor (2022–29): Stefan Crackau

Area
  - Total: 11.41 km^{2} (4.41 sq mi)
- Elevation: 38 m (125 ft)

Population (2025-12-31)
  - Total: 1,936
  - Density: 169.7/km^{2} (439.5/sq mi)
- Time zone: UTC+01:00 (CET)
  - Summer (DST): UTC+02:00 (CEST)
- Postal codes: 39326
- Dialling codes: 039208
- Vehicle registration: BK
- Website: www.zielitz.de

Zielitz (German pronunciation: [ˈtsiːlɪts]) is a municipality in the Börde district in Saxony-Anhalt, Germany.
