= Schelldorf =

- Stadtteil of Tangerhütte
- Interactive map of Schelldorf
- Location within Germany Location within Saxony-Anhalt
- Coordinates: 52°28′11″N 11°58′59″E
- Country: Germany
- State: Saxony-Anhalt
- District: Stendal
- Town: Tangerhütte

Area
  - Total: 4.62 km^{2} (1.78 sq mi)
- Elevation: 33 m (108 ft)

Population (2008-12-31)
  - Total: 122
  - Density: 26.4/km^{2} (68.4/sq mi)
- Time zone: UTC+01:00 (CET)
  - Summer (DST): UTC+02:00 (CEST)
- Postal codes: 39517
- Dialling codes: 039362
- Vehicle registration: SDL

Schelldorf is a village and a former municipality in the district of Stendal, in Saxony-Anhalt, Germany. Since 31 May 2010, it is part of the town Tangerhütte.

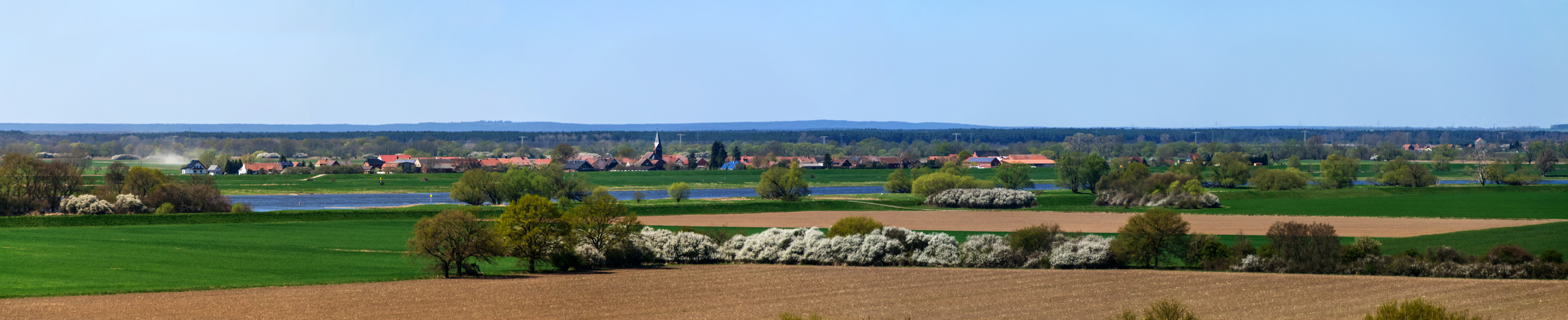
Schelldorf on the Elbe
