= Bittkau =

- Stadtteil of Tangerhütte
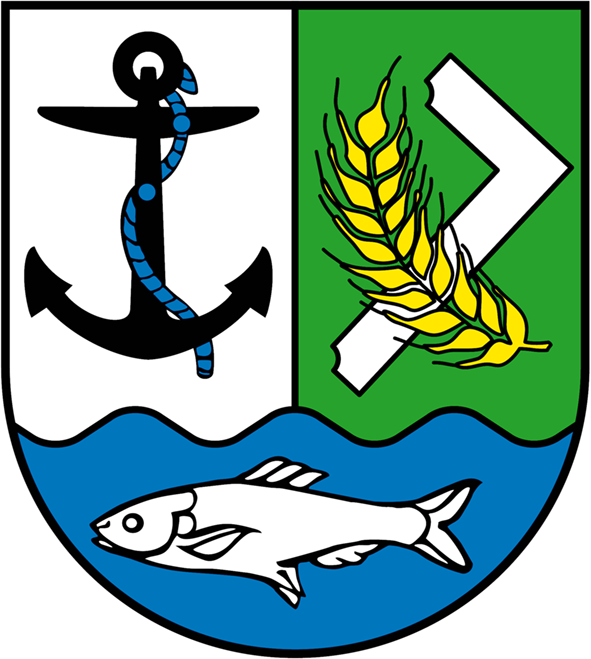
- Coat of arms
- Interactive map of Bittkau
- Location within Germany Location within Saxony-Anhalt
- Coordinates: 52°25′N 11°58′E
- Country: Germany
- State: Saxony-Anhalt
- District: Stendal
- Town: Tangerhütte

Area
  - Total: 11.06 km^{2} (4.27 sq mi)
- Elevation: 34 m (112 ft)

Population (2008-12-31)
  - Total: 698
  - Density: 63.1/km^{2} (163/sq mi)
- Time zone: UTC+01:00 (CET)
  - Summer (DST): UTC+02:00 (CEST)
- Postal codes: 39517
- Dialling codes: 039362
- Vehicle registration: SDL

Bittkau is a village and a former municipality in the district of Stendal, in Saxony-Anhalt, Germany. Since 31 May 2010, it is part of the town Tangerhütte.
