= Ringfurth =

- Stadtteil of Tangerhütte
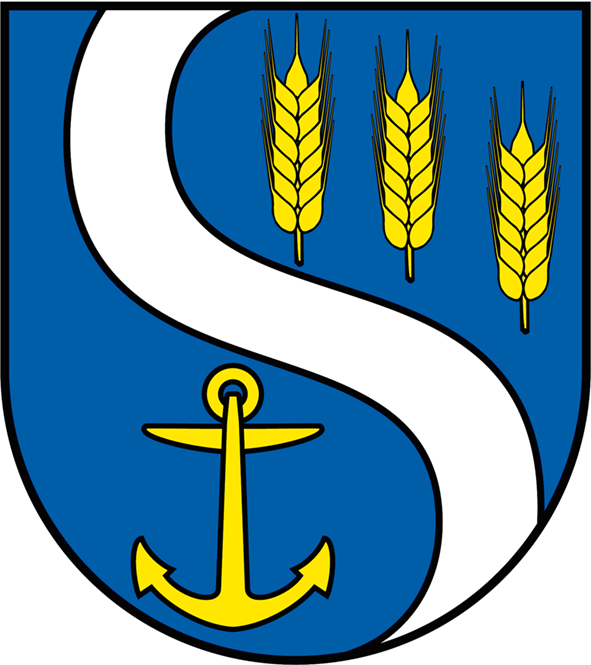
- Coat of arms
- Interactive map of Ringfurth
- Location within Germany Location within Saxony-Anhalt
- Coordinates: 52°22′52″N 11°54′11″E
- Country: Germany
- State: Saxony-Anhalt
- District: Stendal
- Town: Tangerhütte

Area
  - Total: 14.55 km^{2} (5.62 sq mi)
- Elevation: 36 m (118 ft)

Population (2008-12-31)
  - Total: 314
  - Density: 21.6/km^{2} (55.9/sq mi)
- Time zone: UTC+01:00 (CET)
  - Summer (DST): UTC+02:00 (CEST)
- Postal codes: 39517
- Dialling codes: 039366
- Vehicle registration: SDL

Ringfurth is a village and a former municipality in the district of Stendal, in Saxony-Anhalt, Germany. Since 31 May 2010, it is part of the town Tangerhütte.

== Culture and sights ==
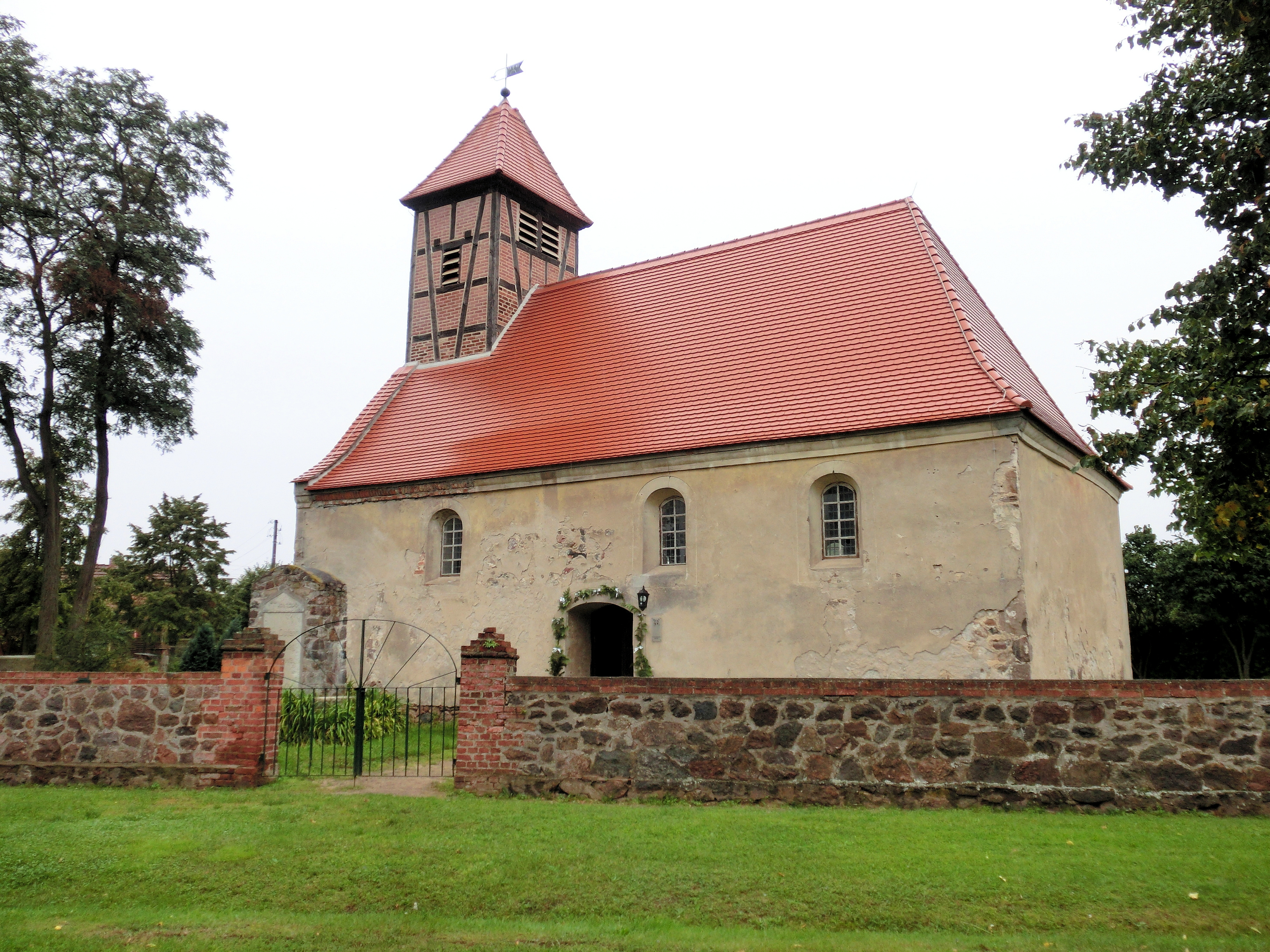
Dorfkirche Ringfurth

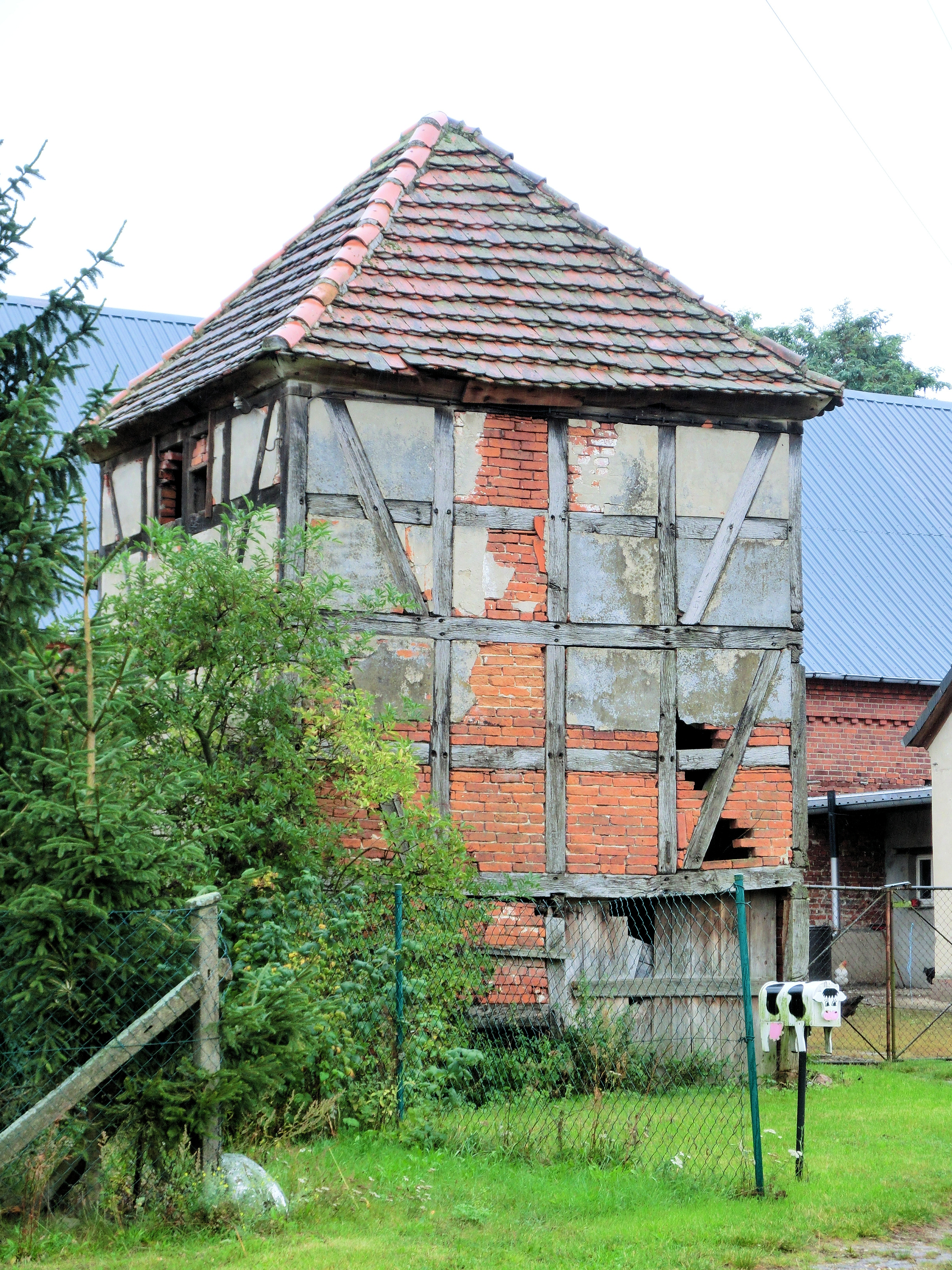
Taubenturm auf dem Gutsgelände

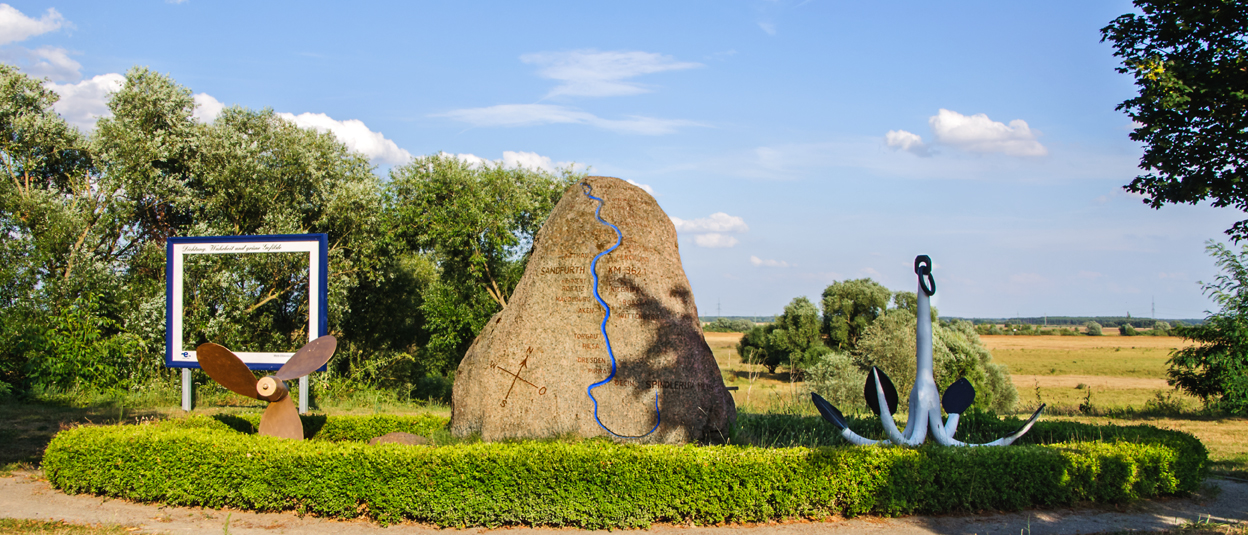
Schifferdenkmal in Sandfurth
