= Schernebeck =

- Stadtteil of Tangerhütte
- Interactive map of Schernebeck
- Location within Germany Location within Saxony-Anhalt
- Coordinates: 52°28′N 11°44′E
- Country: Germany
- State: Saxony-Anhalt
- District: Stendal
- Town: Tangerhütte

Area
  - Total: 12.24 km^{2} (4.73 sq mi)
- Elevation: 39 m (128 ft)

Population (2006-12-31)
  - Total: 243
  - Density: 19.9/km^{2} (51.4/sq mi)
- Time zone: UTC+01:00 (CET)
  - Summer (DST): UTC+02:00 (CEST)
- Postal codes: 39517
- Dialling codes: 039361
- Vehicle registration: SDL

Schernebeck is a village and a former municipality in the district of Stendal, in Saxony-Anhalt, Germany. Since 31 May 2010, it is part of the town Tangerhütte.
