= Uchtdorf =

- Stadtteil of Tangerhütte
- Interactive map of Uchtdorf
- Location within Germany Location within Saxony-Anhalt
- Coordinates: 52°25′N 11°45′E
- Country: Germany
- State: Saxony-Anhalt
- District: Stendal
- Town: Tangerhütte

Area
  - Total: 15.35 km^{2} (5.93 sq mi)
- Elevation: 37 m (121 ft)

Population (2008-12-31)
  - Total: 292
  - Density: 19.0/km^{2} (49.3/sq mi)
- Time zone: UTC+01:00 (CET)
  - Summer (DST): UTC+02:00 (CEST)
- Postal codes: 39517
- Dialling codes: 03935
- Vehicle registration: SDL

Uchtdorf is a village and a former municipality in the district of Stendal, in Saxony-Anhalt, Germany. Since 31 May 2010, it is part of the town Tangerhütte.
