= Uetz =

- Stadtteil of Tangerhütte
- Coat of arms
- Interactive map of Uetz
- Location within Germany Location within Saxony-Anhalt
- Coordinates: 52°22′0″N 11°50′35″E
- Country: Germany
- State: Saxony-Anhalt
- District: Stendal
- Town: Tangerhütte

Area
  - Total: 5.85 km^{2} (2.26 sq mi)
- Elevation: 45 m (148 ft)

Population (2008-12-31)
  - Total: 188
  - Density: 32.1/km^{2} (83.2/sq mi)
- Time zone: UTC+01:00 (CET)
  - Summer (DST): UTC+02:00 (CEST)
- Postal codes: 39517
- Dialling codes: 039366
- Vehicle registration: SDL

Uetz is a village and a former municipality in the district of Stendal, in the state Saxony-Anhalt, Germany. Since 31 May 2010, it is part of the town of Tangerhütte.

== History ==
First recogninized it was in the Landbuch der Mark Brandenburg in the year 1375 where was stated: Usas has been desolate for thirty years. From the available writings it follows that the village of Uetz is very likely of Wendish origin, and the meaning accordingly:

"Meadow between the waters"

This explanation would be very appropriate for the village of Uetz, because in the past the Elbe stream flowed into two broad arms, the Burger Arm and the Tangier Arm, to the right and left of the valley sand area on whose southwestern edge the village lies.
