= Lüderitz, Germany =

Lüderitz
- Stadtteil of Tangerhütte
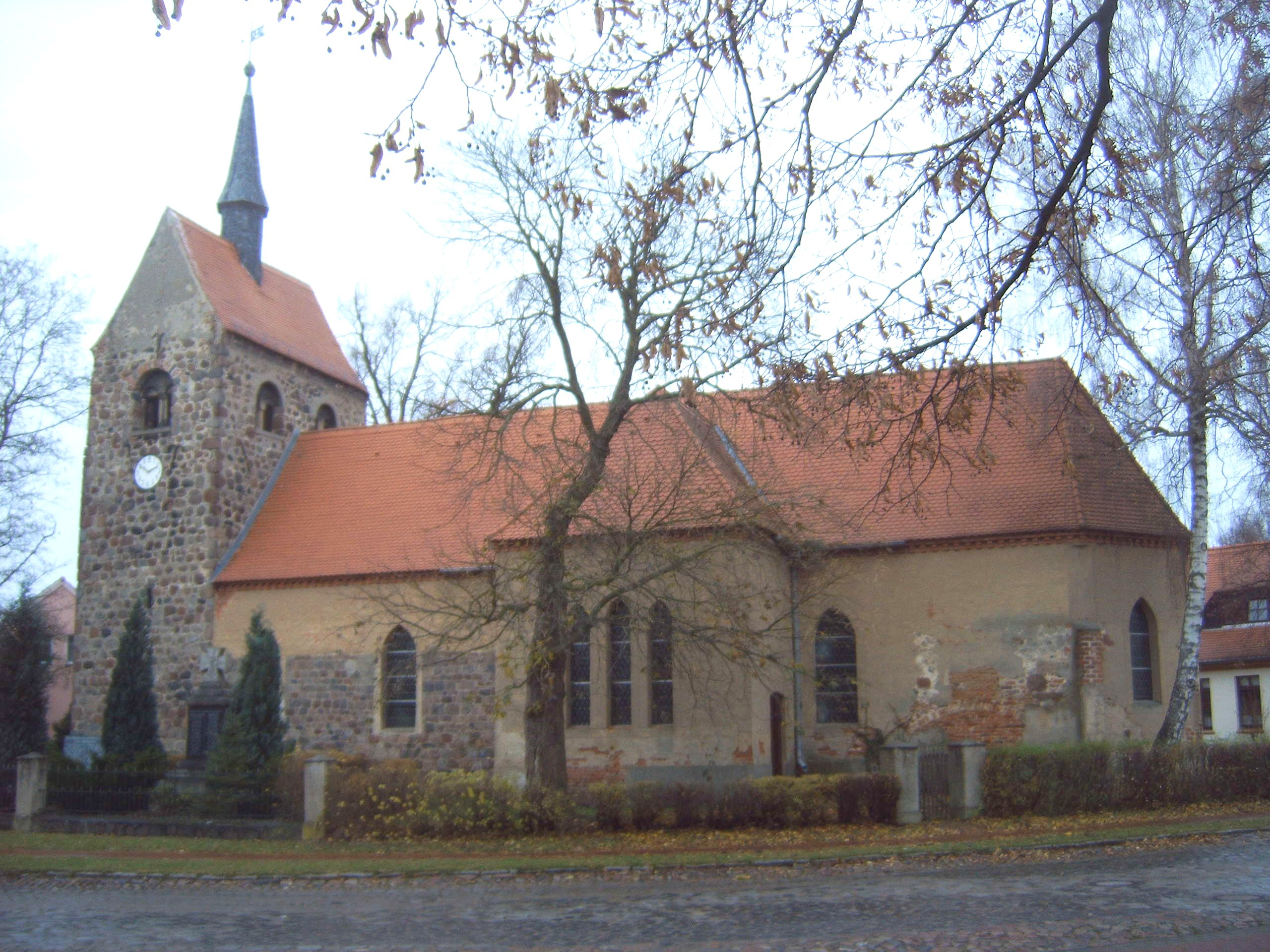
- Lüderitz Village Church

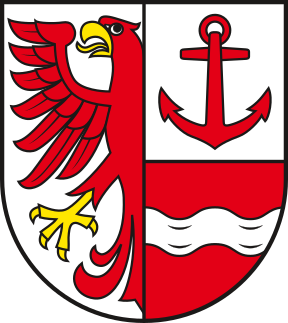
- Coat of arms
- Interactive map of Lüderitz
- Location within Germany Location within Saxony-Anhalt
- Coordinates: 52°30′24″N 11°44′48″E
- Country: Germany
- State: Saxony-Anhalt
- District: Stendal
- Town: Tangerhütte

Area
  - Total: 38.84 km^{2} (15.00 sq mi)
- Elevation: 40 m (130 ft)

Population (2008-12-31)
  - Total: 1,119
  - Density: 28.81/km^{2} (74.62/sq mi)
- Time zone: UTC+01:00 (CET)
  - Summer (DST): UTC+02:00 (CEST)
- Postal codes: 39517
- Dialling codes: 039361
- Vehicle registration: SDL

Lüderitz is a village and a former municipality in the district of Stendal, in Saxony-Anhalt, Germany. Since 31 May 2010, it is part of the town of Tangerhütte.
