= Cobbel =

- Stadtteil of Tangerhütte
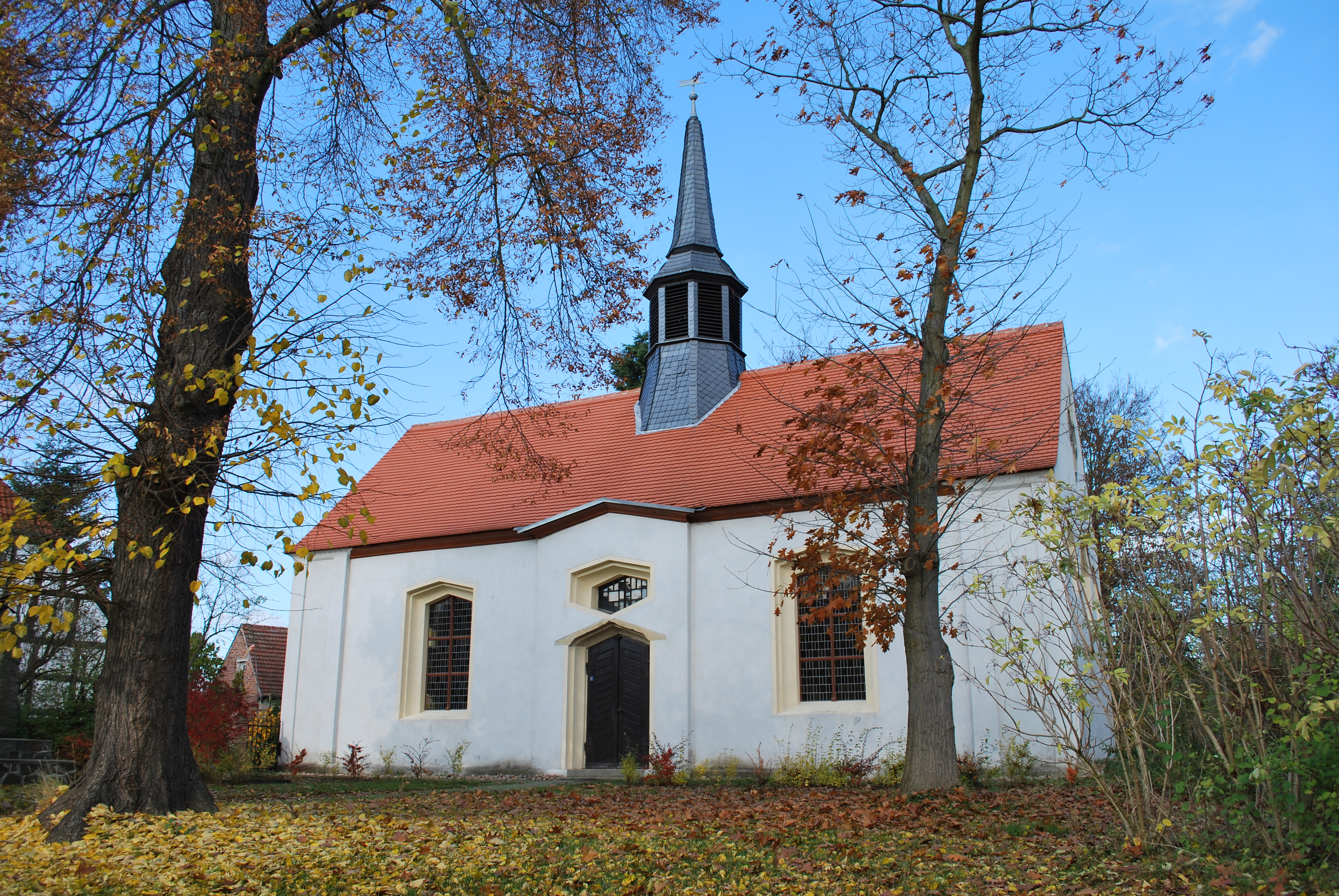
- Evang.-Lutheran church in Cobbel

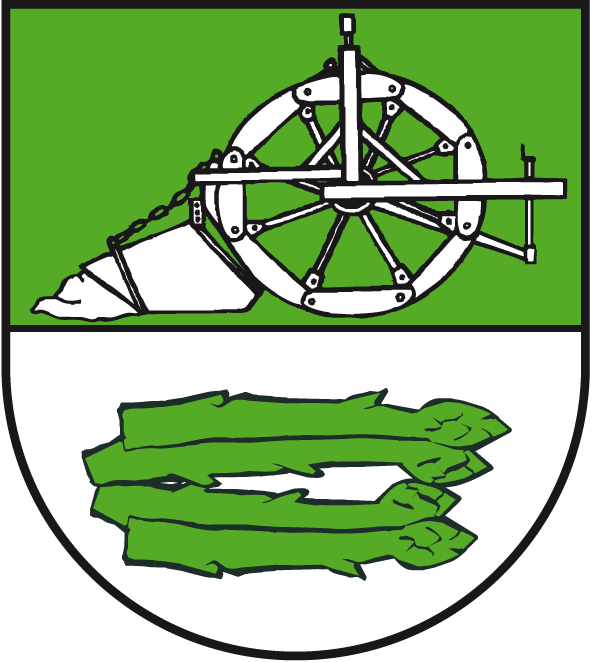
- Coat of arms
- Interactive map of Cobbel
- Location within Germany Location within Saxony-Anhalt
- Coordinates: 52°23′N 11°52′E
- Country: Germany
- State: Saxony-Anhalt
- District: Stendal
- Town: Tangerhütte

Area
  - Total: 11.15 km^{2} (4.31 sq mi)
- Elevation: 47 m (154 ft)

Population (2008-12-31)
  - Total: 255
  - Density: 22.9/km^{2} (59.2/sq mi)
- Time zone: UTC+01:00 (CET)
  - Summer (DST): UTC+02:00 (CEST)
- Postal codes: 39517
- Dialling codes: 03935
- Vehicle registration: SDL

Cobbel is a village and a former municipality in the district of Stendal, in Saxony-Anhalt, Germany. Since 31 May 2010, it is part of the town Tangerhütte.

Cobbel is situated only two miles from the Elbe river.

In 1824, Cobbel was devastated by a great fire. The church has been rebuilt in 1829.

Since about 1800, Cobbel, with its sandy soil, is a village, where asparagus plants are grown. A 19th century device for creating so-called asparagus beds is depicted in the village' s coat of arms.
