= Kehnert =

- Stadtteil of Tangerhütte
- Coat of arms
- Interactive map of Kehnert
- Location within Germany Location within Saxony-Anhalt
- Coordinates: 52°20′24″N 11°51′11″E
- Country: Germany
- State: Saxony-Anhalt
- District: Stendal
- Town: Tangerhütte

Area
  - Total: 9.30 km^{2} (3.59 sq mi)
- Elevation: 37 m (121 ft)

Population (2008-12-31)
  - Total: 371
  - Density: 39.9/km^{2} (103/sq mi)
- Time zone: UTC+01:00 (CET)
  - Summer (DST): UTC+02:00 (CEST)
- Postal codes: 39517
- Dialling codes: 039366
- Vehicle registration: SDL

Kehnert is a village and a former municipality in the district of Stendal, in Saxony-Anhalt, Germany. Since 31 May 2010, it has been part of the town of Tangerhütte.
