= Windberge =

- Stadtteil of Tangerhütte
- Interactive map of Windberge
- Location within Germany Location within Saxony-Anhalt
- Coordinates: 52°31′N 11°43′E
- Country: Germany
- State: Saxony-Anhalt
- District: Stendal
- Town: Tangerhütte

Area
  - Total: 32.41 km^{2} (12.51 sq mi)
- Elevation: 31 m (102 ft)

Population (2008-12-31)
  - Total: 301
  - Density: 9.29/km^{2} (24.1/sq mi)
- Time zone: UTC+01:00 (CET)
  - Summer (DST): UTC+02:00 (CEST)
- Postal codes: 39579
- Dialling codes: 039361
- Vehicle registration: SDL

Windberge is a village and a former municipality in the district of Stendal, in Saxony-Anhalt, Germany. Since 31 May 2010, it is part of the town Tangerhütte.
