= Grieben =

- Stadtteil of Tangerhütte
- Interactive map of Grieben
- Location within Germany Location within Saxony-Anhalt
- Coordinates: 52°26′N 11°58′E
- Country: Germany
- State: Saxony-Anhalt
- District: Stendal
- Town: Tangerhütte

Area
  - Total: 20.35 km^{2} (7.86 sq mi)
- Elevation: 34 m (112 ft)

Population (2008-12-31)
  - Total: 759
  - Density: 37.3/km^{2} (96.6/sq mi)
- Time zone: UTC+01:00 (CET)
  - Summer (DST): UTC+02:00 (CEST)
- Postal codes: 39517
- Dialling codes: 039362
- Vehicle registration: SDL

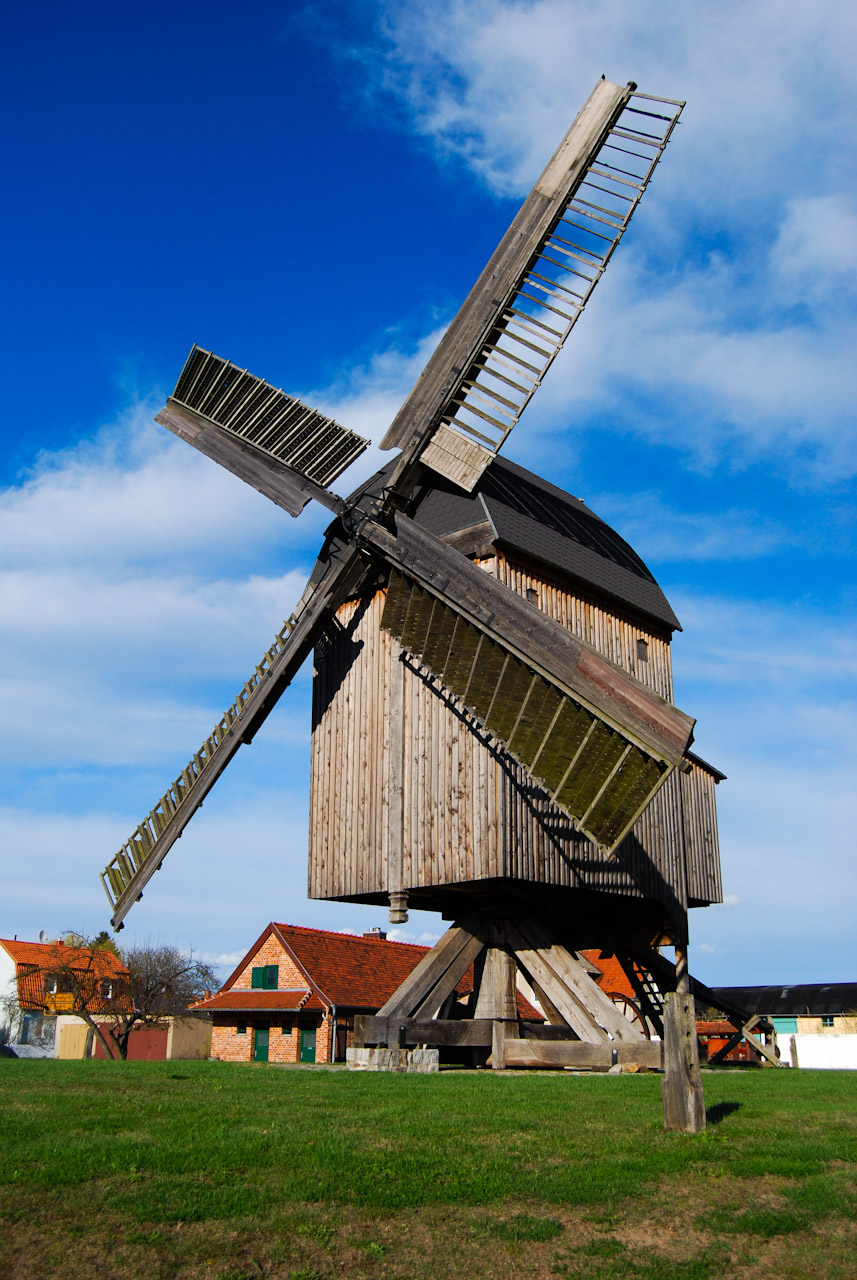
Post mill in Grieben

Grieben is a village and a former municipality in the district of Stendal, in Saxony-Anhalt, Germany. Since 31 May 2010, it is part of the town Tangerhütte.
