= Magdeburg-Wittenberge railway =

Railway line in Germany

Magdeburg–Wittenberge railway
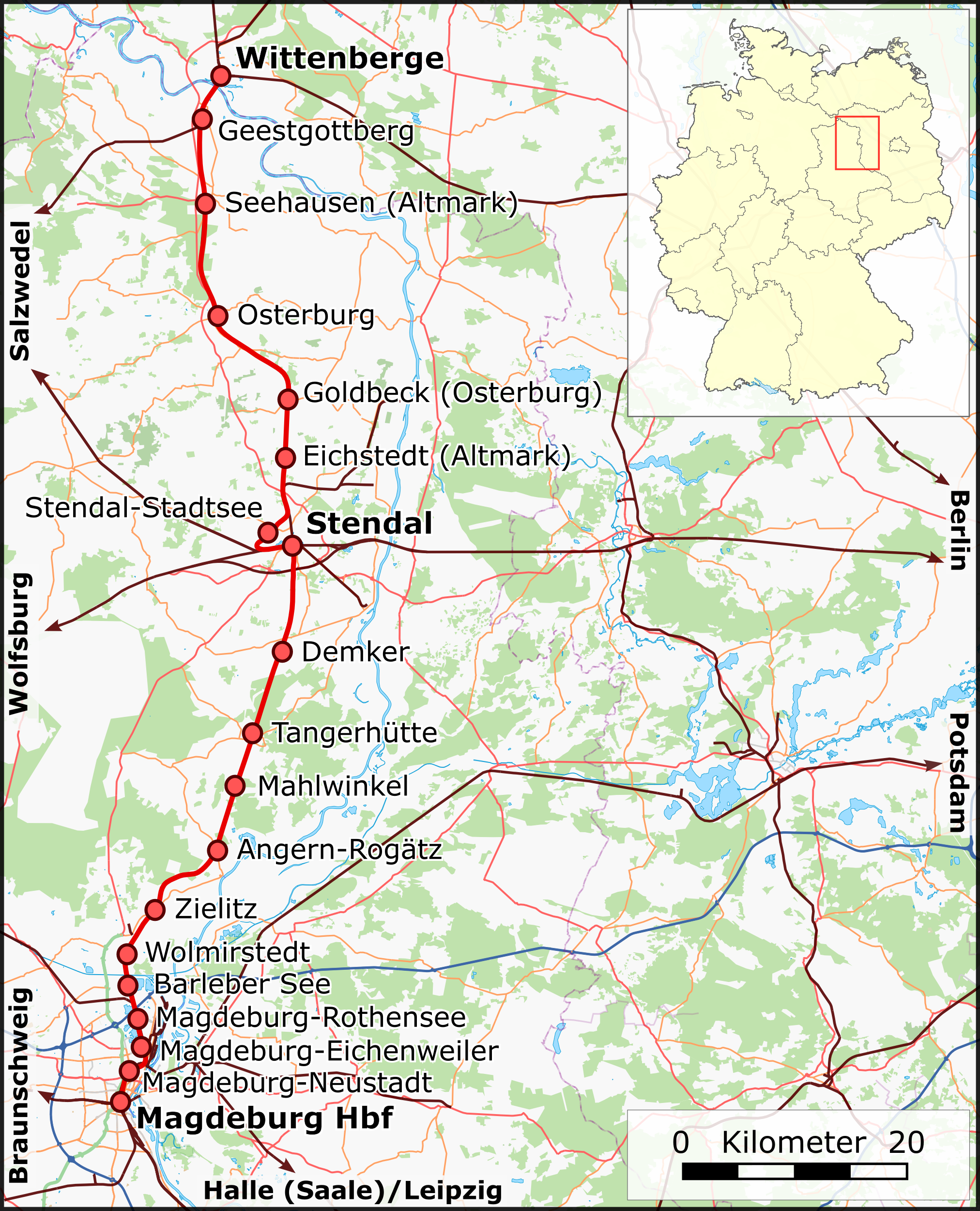
- Route of the Magdeburg–Wittenberge railway

Overview
- Native name: Bahnstrecke Magdeburg–Wittenberge
- Line number: 6401 (Wittenberge–Stendal); 6402 (Stendal–Magdeburg)
- Locale: Brandenburg, Saxony-Anhalt, Germany

Service
- Route number: 305

Technical
- Line length: 112.5 km (69.9 mi)
- Track gauge: 1,435 mm (4 ft 8 1/2 in) standard gauge
- Minimum radius: 1,130 m (3,710 ft)
- Electrification: 15 kV/16.7 Hz AC; Overhead catenary

The Magdeburg-Wittenberge railway is a two-track, electrified main line in the north of the German state of Saxony-Anhalt. It is one of the oldest lines in Germany, opened in 1849 by the Magdeburg-Wittenberge Railway Company, which operated it until 1863, when it was taken over by the Magdeburg-Halberstadt Railway Company. It was nationalised in 1879.

== Route ==
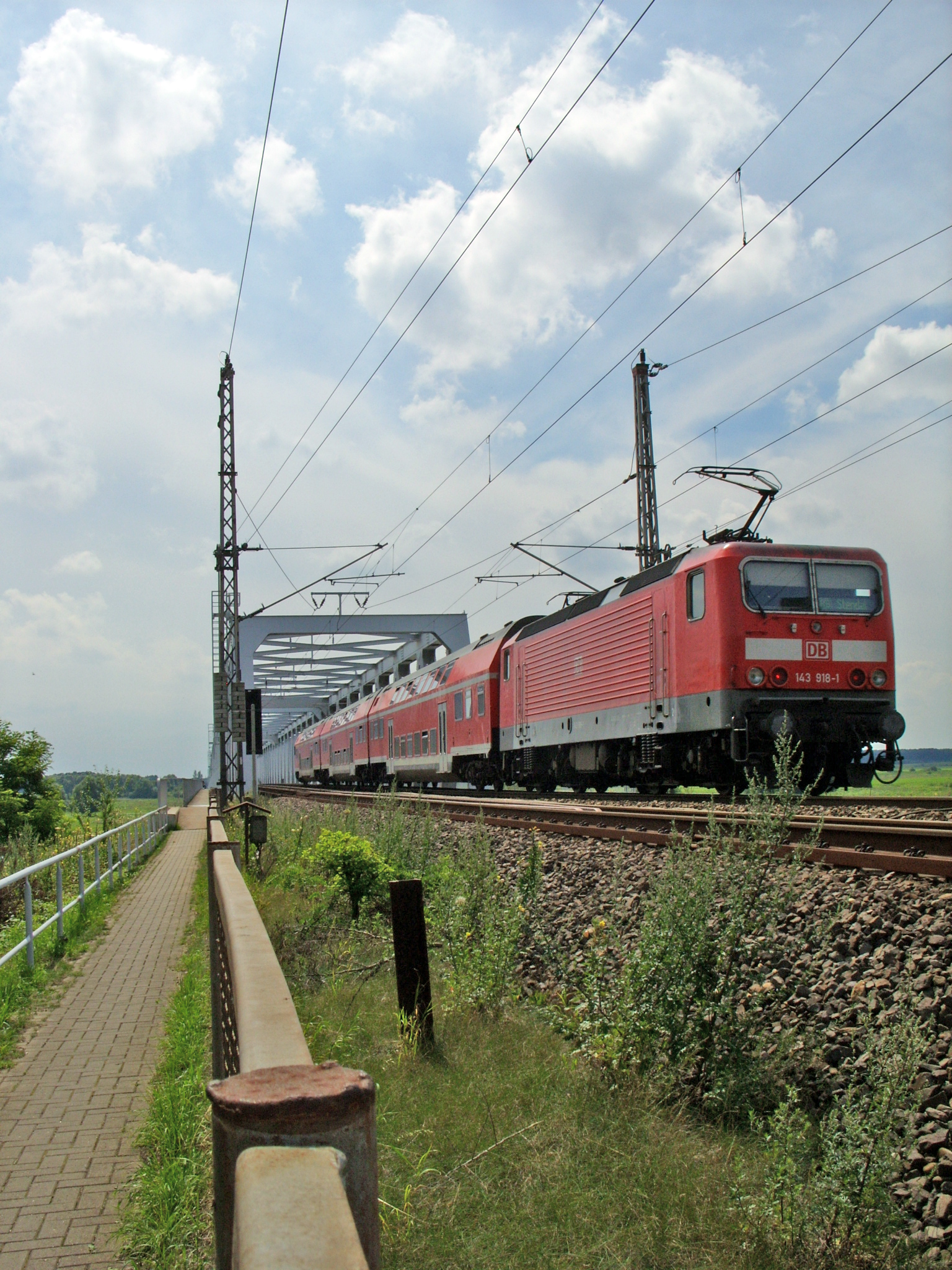
Regionalbahn train crossing the Elbe bridge at Wittenberge

The line starts at Magdeburg Hauptbahnhof and then runs to the north, mostly between the Elbe and the B 189 highway. The line is used by regional trains and as far as Zielitz by S-Bahn Mittelelbe trains. In the middle of the line is Stendal, where it connects with lines to Berlin, Hanover, Tangermünde and Salzwedel. Leaving Stendal, the line turns north. The line crosses the Elbe just before its end in Wittenberge. The Elbe bridge is the longest railway bridge constructed in East Germany during its existence. In Wittenberge station the line connects to the Berlin–Hamburg trunk line. The station was originally designed as a wedge station between the two lines, but was rebuilt during the upgrading of the Berlin–Hamburg line between 2000 and 2004.

== History ==
Planning of the line began in 1838 with the opening of the Berlin-Potsdam Railway, which initiated the railway age in the Kingdom of Prussia. A continuation of the line to the west was already planned, but without a precise route. The town of Stendal, which had no rail connection, sought a continuation of the line from Potsdam via Genthin and Stendal to Hamburg. From Genthin there would also be a branch line to Magdeburg. This plan was rejected in favour of a direct link between Berlin and Hamburg. At the same time, plans for a continuation of the Berlin-Potsdam Railway developed into a direct link to Magdeburg.

Magdeburg was developing into one of the first major railway junctions and by September 1846 there were already three lines: the Magdeburg-Leipzig railway (German: Magdeburg-Leipziger Eisenbahn-Gesellschaft, MLE) from Leipzig, the Berlin-Potsdam-Magdeburg Railway (Berlin-Potsdam-Magdeburger Eisenbahngesellschaft, BPME) from Berlin and the Magdeburg-Halberstadt Railway (Magdeburg-Halberstädter Eisenbahngesellschaft, MHE) from Halberstadt. However, the city was not connected to Hamburg, which was especially important for foreign trade. Then, at the initiative of the mayor of Magdeburg, August Wilhelm Francke, a route was defined. This route was adopted by the Prussian government on 29 September 1843 as the shortest and most economic line between Magdeburg and Wittenberg, connecting to the line to Hamburg. The Magdeburg-Wittenberg Magdeburg Railway Company was constituted as the designated operator in the following month. Approval for the construction of the line depended mainly on minimising its impact on the Elbe levees in Altmark. In order for the company to obtain a concession it had to develop concrete plans for the Elbe crossing and to make preparations for work to be carried out on the levees.

On 6 July 1845 the Prussian king Frederick William IV made a decree authorising the construction by the joint stock company with a capital of 4,500,000 thalers. The estimated construction costs totalled 4,483,000 thalers as follows:

- 3 million thalers for the section from Magdeburg to Seehausen,
- 83,000 thalers for the section from Seehausen to the Elbe levee,
- 1.4 million thalers for the Elbe bridge and connection in Wittenberge.

Construction, when it started in 1846, was found to be relatively straightforward. The chosen route had a maximum gradient of 1 in 210 and its sharpest curve had a radius of 300 Prussian rods (equivalent to about 1,130 metres). About 55 ½ percent of the line was level.

Only at each end of the line did construction prove to be problematic. In Wittenberge the construction of the bridge over the Elbe led to postponement of the opening of the entire line. In Magdeburg, the problem was integration with other lines. It was necessary for the line to connect to the west and the south, that is with the MHE and MLE lines. To achieve this, there were two possibilities: the first was for the line to cross the slopes of the fortifications on the western edge of Magdeburg to the MHE station. This was a difficult route that had to cross a ring of hills around the fortifications. This route did not appear feasible as the military authorities prohibited cutting through the ridge. The alternative was to cut through the fortifications and build a station within the city.

The line ran from the north along the Elbe and through the city walls. Since there was insufficient room for the line to make a curve to return to the edge of the river, which was to the east, the riverbank had to be excavated to make room for the railway. A terminal station and associated facilities was built inside the city. A line was built to connect with the Magdeburg–Leipzig line.

=== Private railway era ===
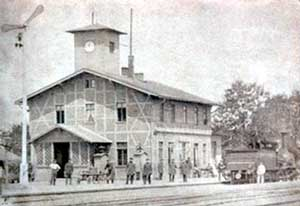
Wolmirstedt station in 1880

The line was opened in three phases. On 7 July 1849, the 99 km-long section from Magdeburg to Seehausen was opened. On 5 August 1849 this was followed by the eight km-long section to the Elbe levee. Since the Elbe bridge was under construction, passengers had to cross to Wittenberge by ferry. On 25 October 1851, a wooden, single-track bridge was opened to traffic. To avoid this low-level structure obstructing shipping, part of it was built as a swing bridge. During the construction of the Berlin–Hamburg line, the terminus had been designed to integrate with the line from Magdeburg. The station building was originally located between the junction of the two lines.

As well as a direct line from Magdeburg to Hamburg, the route was initially seen as a route between the coast and central and southern Germany. This service did not prove as profitable as initially suggested to shareholders. In addition, in 1855 a large part of the line had to be rebuilt as a result of several floods in Altmark. In 1863, the company was bought by the Magdeburg-Halberstadt Railway Company. A direct connection did not exist between the two companies' lines and trains had to use a short piece of the Leipzig line.

In 1867, the MHE received a concession to build the Berlin–Lehrte railway (also known as the Lehrter Railway or Lehrter Bahn). A direct line already existed via Magdeburg, but the new route via Stendal was more direct and thus services would be quicker. The railway facilities in Stendal had to be rebuilt to make it easy for passengers to change trains. The Lehrter Railway runs south of the old town of Wittenberg from east to west, while the old line ran on the eastern edge of the town. The new Lehrter Railway has a connection with a relocated line from Wittenberge to the west of Stendal. This allowed two routes to share the new Stendal station. The diverted line to Wittenberge passes around the town along the north western boundary and then returns to its old route to the north. In addition to the Lehrter Railway, which opened through Stendal in 1871, the so-called America Line opened in 1873 from Stendal via Uelzen to Bremen.

In subsequent years operations in Magdeburg became increasingly unsatisfactory. The transfer of trains to the Leipzig railway was difficult and the Elbe river prevented the expansion of the rail facilities. Hence the old idea of a common route through the ring of forts was taken up again. As the urban area was growing and the areas outside the walls were being settled, the fortifications were increasingly seen as a nuisance. There still had to be lengthy negotiations with the Prussian military before the railways were offered a suitable site along the northern and western moat. The line was built jointly by the MHE, BPME and MLE. The new Magdeburg Central station was built as an island station (with the main station building between the tracks) because the three railway companies were still working separately. The eastern station tracks were built and operated by the MLE and the western tracks by the BPME and the MHE. The first train ran on 15 May 1873 to Burg; work continued, however, until 1893. During this period, in 1876, the MLE was taken over by the MHE. Three years later the MHE was nationalised.

=== Prussian state railways era ===
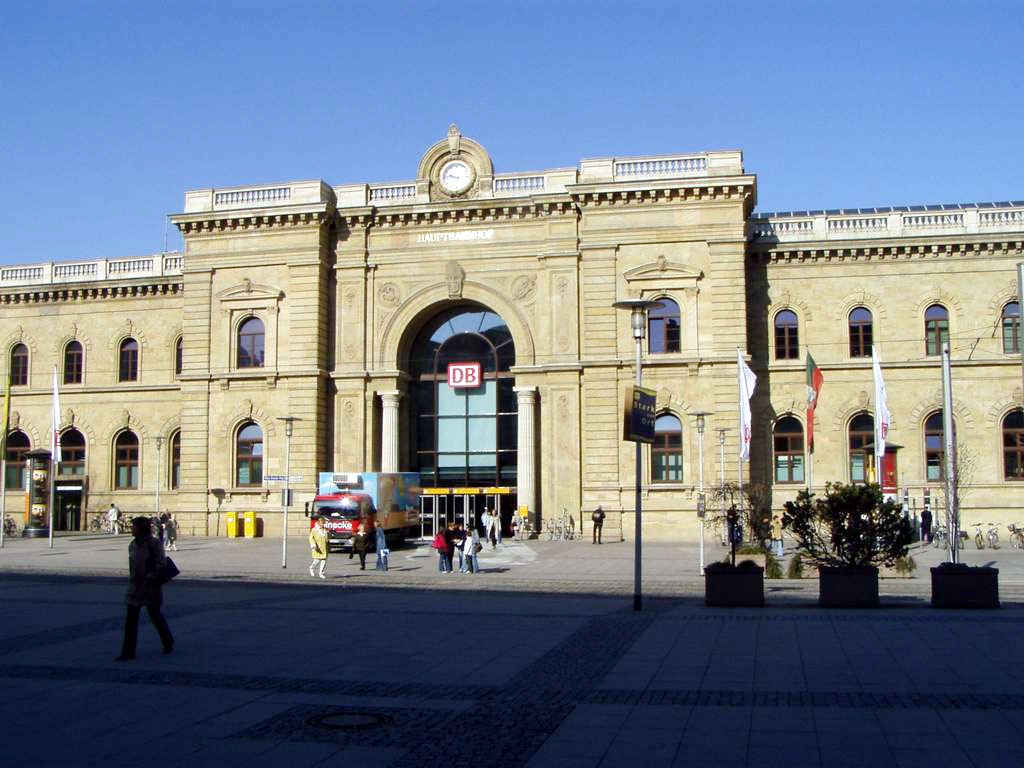
Facade of Magdeburg Hauptbahnhof

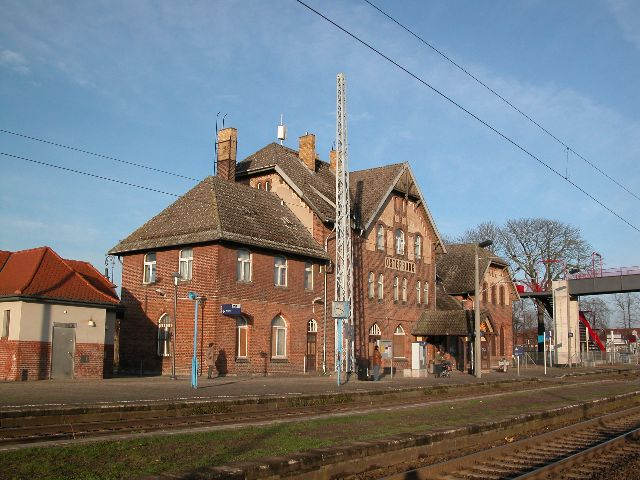
Osterburg station

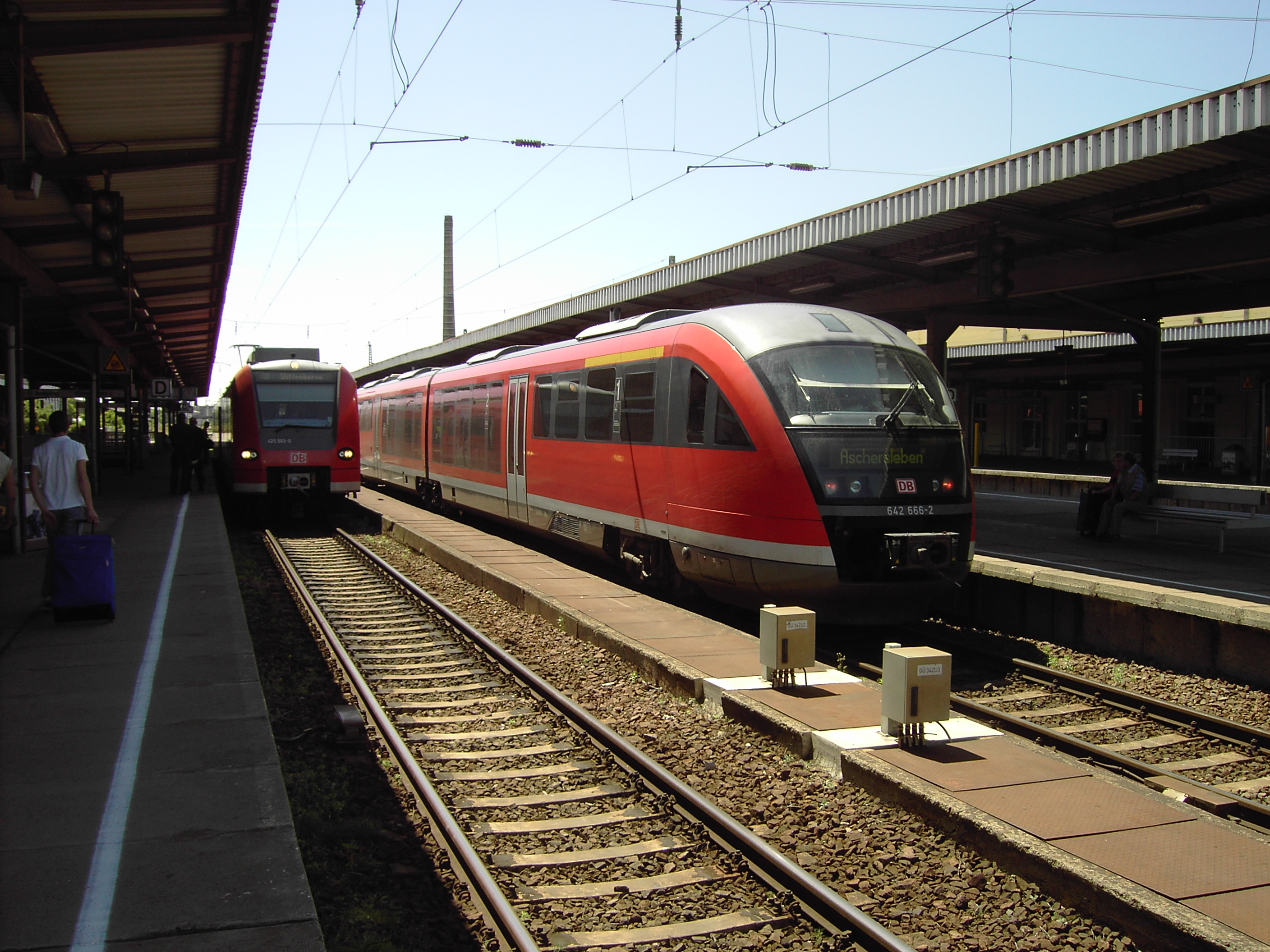
A class 425 (left) waits in Magdeburg on its way to Wittenberge

After the takeover of the MHE, the Prussian state railways acquired other companies. The state railways established royal railway divisions, each called a Königlichen Eisenbahndirektion (KED). The Magdeburg-Wittenberge Railway came under the new Magdeburg KED. North of Stendal the line came under the Hanover KED.

A new Wittenberge Elbe bridge was built between 1883 and 1884. Most of the old wooden bridge was dilapidated and was replaced by a wrought iron truss bridge. The swing bridge was retained, but was replaced in a second reconstruction by a steel structure between 1905 and 1910. At this time, the bridge was widened to include a second track on its northern or eastern side. The southern track also adapted to permit road vehicles to cross, as there was no road bridge in Wittenberge.

After the founding of Deutsche Reichsbahn (German State Railways) in 1920, the divisions were rearranged. The Magdeburg–Stendal section was assigned to the newly established Hanover railway division (Reichsbahndirektion, RBD); the Stendal–Wittenberge section was assigned to the Hamburg RBD. In addition to local rail services in the Prussian Province of Saxony, the line was also used by mainline services connecting Dresden, Leipzig, Magdeburg, Wittenberge and Hamburg.

Towards the end of the Second World War, the Wittenberg Elbe bridge was blown up. By the autumn of 1945 Soviet pioneers had temporarily restored the southern track of the bridge. The bridge was reduced to a single track line as, as during the Soviet occupation the second track was removed as reparations to the Soviet Union. The northern track of the bridge was restored temporarily in 1947. Due to the lack of a rail track, however, only road traffic ran along this track. In 1950, the second track was re-commissioned and road traffic returned to the southern track.

The route was developed in the coming years as the most important north–south link in East German, bypassing Berlin. The second track was quickly restored. Because operations over the bridge, despite its two tracks, was restricted to a speed of 30 km/h, it became a bottleneck. In 1957, the superstructure of the bridge was replaced using its old pillars.

In 1969 the Magdeburg S-Bahn was established. This involved adapting all the lines' infrastructure as far as Zielitz, which was selected as the northern terminus, to support a mixed operation of S-Bahn, regional, long-distance and freight traffic. Similarly, overhead lines were installed to support electric operations. North of the village of Zielitz, a four-track Zielitz station was built, letting S-Bahn trains reverse and freight trains continue without obstruction. Continuing towards Magdeburg a pair of tracks was built for the S-Bahn from the junction with the line from Oebisfelde, bypassing the Magdeburg-Rothensee marshalling yard. From Magdeburg-Neustadt the S-Bahn shared the common line with other train traffic. S-Bahn operations commenced on 29 September 1974.

Further electrification was carried out in the 1980s. Electric operations were extended to Stendal in 1982 and to Wittenberge in 1987. The East Germany Railways built a new bridge over the Elbe without obstructing operations. The new bridge was the longest railway bridge built during the existence of East Germany.

== Current situation ==
Today the line is served by line S1, the only service of the S-Bahn Mittelelbe, between Magdeburg and Wittenberge. In the summer it is served by an InterCity pair of trains called Warnow (2238/2239) from Leipzig via Magdeburg, Wittenberge, Schwerin and Rostock to Warnemünde. Between Magdeburg and Stendal there is also the Regional-Express service RE20 from/to Uelzen via Salzwedel.

In 2012, a new electronic interlocking was put into operation in Wolmirstedt, this is connected to the sub-centre in Biederitz. The new railway tunnel under the Mittelland Canal was completed at the end of 2013.
