= Jerchel, Stendal =

Jerchel
- Stadtteil of Tangerhütte
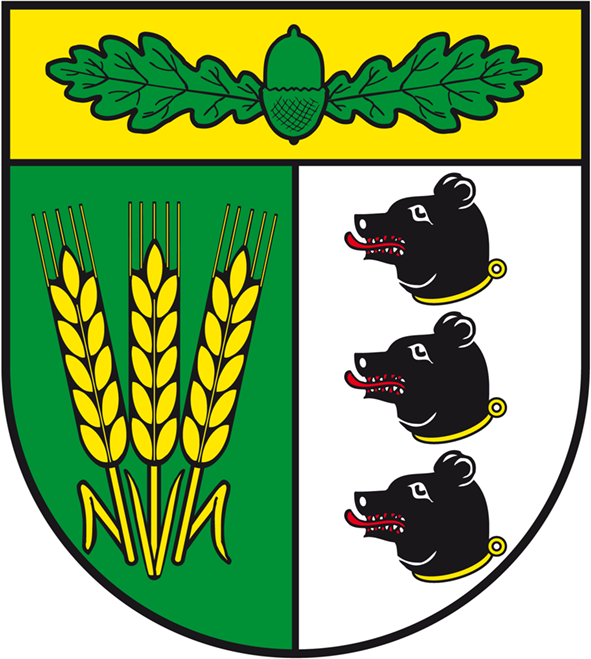
- Coat of arms
- Interactive map of Jerchel
- Location within Germany Location within Saxony-Anhalt
- Coordinates: 52°27′47″N 11°56′35″E
- Country: Germany
- State: Saxony-Anhalt
- District: Stendal
- Town: Tangerhütte

Area
  - Total: 8.98 km^{2} (3.47 sq mi)
- Elevation: 32 m (105 ft)

Population (2008-12-31)
  - Total: 129
  - Density: 14.4/km^{2} (37.2/sq mi)
- Time zone: UTC+01:00 (CET)
  - Summer (DST): UTC+02:00 (CEST)
- Postal codes: 39517
- Dialling codes: 039362
- Vehicle registration: SDL

Jerchel is a village and a former municipality in the district of Stendal, in Saxony-Anhalt, Germany. Since 31 May 2010, it is part of the town Tangerhütte.
