= Bellingen, Saxony-Anhalt =

Bellingen
- Stadtteil of Tangerhütte
- Interactive map of Bellingen
- Location within Germany Location within Saxony-Anhalt
- Coordinates: 52°31′N 11°50′E
- Country: Germany
- State: Saxony-Anhalt
- District: Stendal
- Town: Tangerhütte

Area
  - Total: 11.76 km^{2} (4.54 sq mi)
- Elevation: 35 m (115 ft)

Population (2008-12-31)
  - Total: 267
  - Density: 22.7/km^{2} (58.8/sq mi)
- Time zone: UTC+01:00 (CET)
  - Summer (DST): UTC+02:00 (CEST)
- Postal codes: 39579
- Dialling codes: 039365
- Vehicle registration: SDL

Bellingen (German pronunciation: [ˈbɛlɪŋən]) is a village and a former municipality in the district of Stendal, in Saxony-Anhalt, Germany. Since 31 May 2010, it is part of the town Tangerhütte.
