= Demker =

- Stadtteil of Tangerhütte
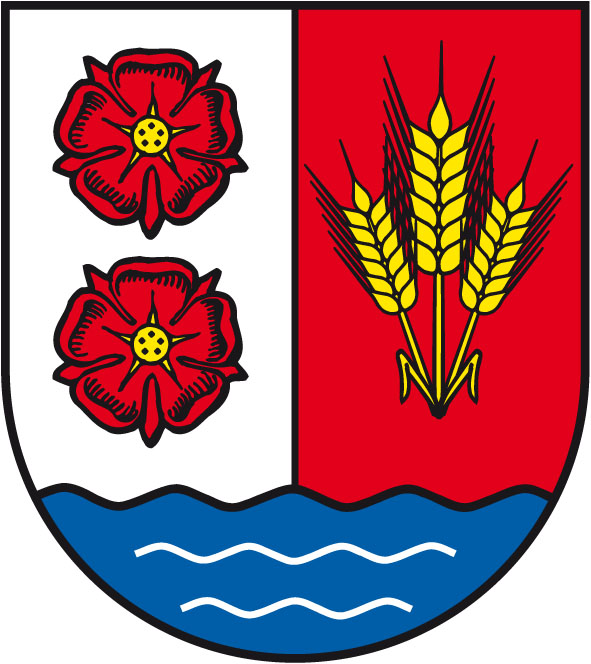
- Coat of arms
- Interactive map of Demker
- Location within Germany Location within Saxony-Anhalt
- Coordinates: 52°30′24″N 11°50′48″E
- Country: Germany
- State: Saxony-Anhalt
- District: Stendal
- Town: Tangerhütte

Area
  - Total: 12.52 km^{2} (4.83 sq mi)
- Elevation: 32 m (105 ft)

Population (2008-12-31)
  - Total: 372
  - Density: 29.7/km^{2} (77.0/sq mi)
- Time zone: UTC+01:00 (CET)
  - Summer (DST): UTC+02:00 (CEST)
- Postal codes: 39579
- Dialling codes: 039365
- Vehicle registration: SDL

Demker is a village and a former municipality in the district of Stendal, in Saxony-Anhalt, Germany. Since 31 May 2010, it is part of the town Tangerhütte.
