= Tangermünde station =

Railway station in Tangermünde, Germany

Tangermünde

General information
- Location: Tangermünde, Saxony-Anhalt; Germany
- Coordinates: 52°32′45″N 11°58′12″E
- Owner: DB Netz
- Operator: DB Station&Service
- Lines: Stendal–Tangermünde (KBS 269)
- Platforms: 1

Other information
- Fare zone: marego: 930

Services
Preceding station	Hanseatische Eisenbahn	Following station
Tangermünde West towards Stendal Hbf	RB 33	Terminus
Location
- Location within Saxony-Anhalt

Tangermünde (German: Bahnhof Tangermünde) is a railway station in the town of Tangermünde, Saxony-Anhalt, Germany. The station lies on the Stendal-Tangermünde railway and the train services are operated by Hanseatische Eisenbahn.

== Train services ==
The station is served by the following services:

- regional bahn RB 33 Stendal - Tangermünde
