= Stendal Hauptbahnhof =

Railway station in Stendal, Germany

Stendal Hbf
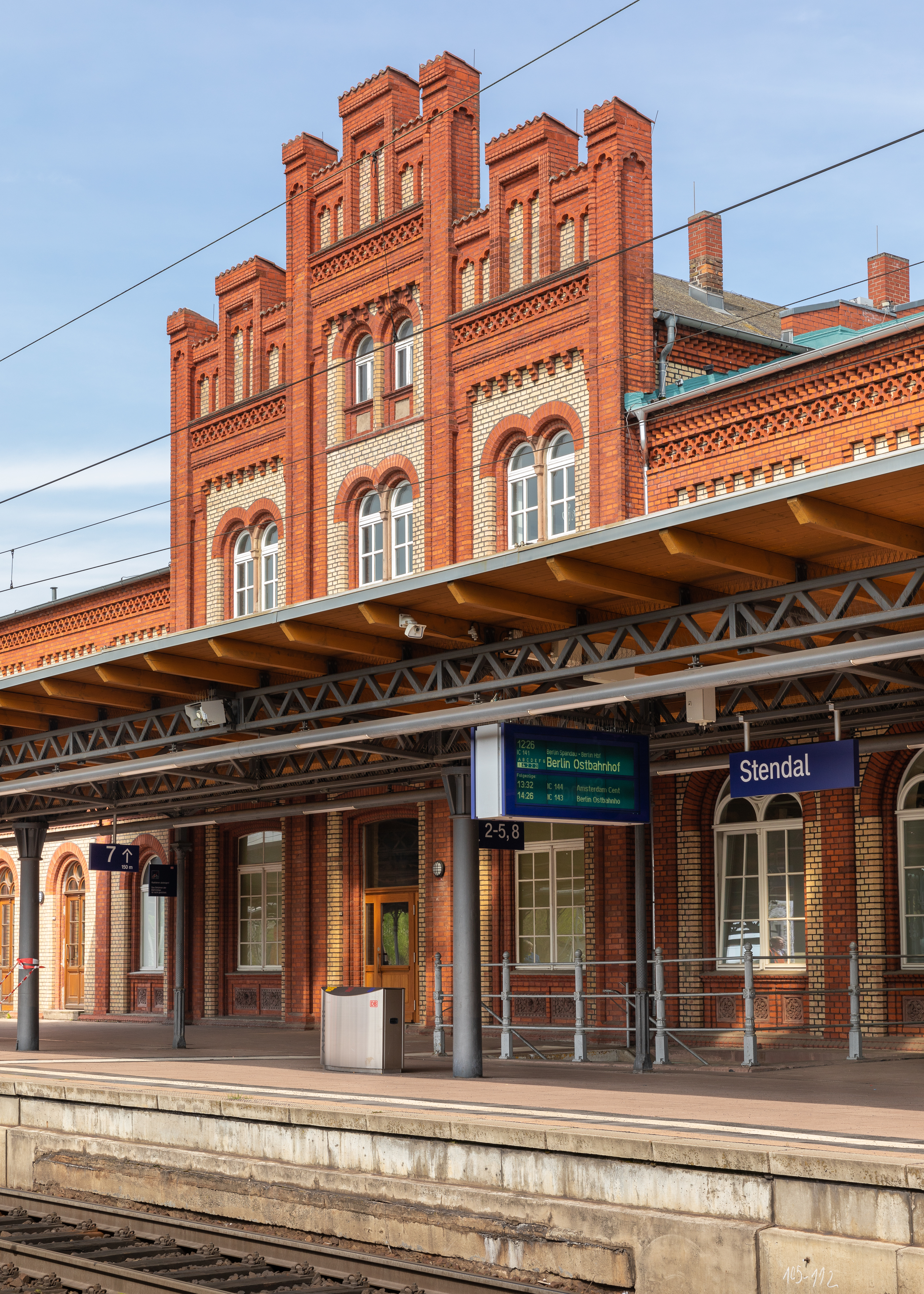
- 2018

General information
- Location: Bahnhofstr. 34, Stendal, Saxony-Anhalt; Germany
- Coordinates: 52°35′40″N 11°51′16″E
- Owner: Deutsche Bahn
- Operator: DB Netz; DB Station&Service
- Lines: Berlin-Lehrte railway; Hanover–Berlin high-speed railway; Magdeburg-Wittenberge railway; Stendal–Uelzen railway; Stendal-Tangermünde railway; Stendal–Niedergörne railway
- Platforms: 8

Construction
- Accessible: Yes

Other information
- Station code: 6010
- DS100 code: LS
- IBNR: 8010334
- Category: 3
- Website: www.bahnhof.de

History
- Opened: 1871
Services
| Preceding station | DB Fernverkehr | Following station |
|---|---|---|
| Wolfsburg Hbf towards Köln Hbf | ICE 10 | Berlin-Spandau towards Berlin Ostbahnhof |
| Wolfsburg Hbf towards Zürich HB | ICE 12 | Berlin-Spandau towards Berlin Ostbahnhof |
| Wolfsburg Hbf towards Frankfurt Airport, Frankfurt (Main) Hbf, Karlsruhe Hbf or Stuttgart Hbf | ICE 13 | Berlin-Spandau towards Berlin Ostbahnhof |
| Wittenberge towards Rostock Hbf or Warnemünde | IC 57 | Magdeburg Hbf towards Leipzig Hbf |
| Wittenberge towards Hamburg Hbf | IC 57 | Magdeburg Hbf Terminus |
| Preceding station | DB Regio Südost | Following station |
| Hohenwulsch towards Uelzen | RE 20 | Tangerhütte towards Magdeburg Hbf |
| Steinfeld (Stendal) towards Salzwedel | RB 32 | Terminus |
| Preceding station | DB Regio Nordost | Following station |
| Terminus | RE 4 | Rathenow towards Jüterbog |
| Preceding station | Start | Following station |
| Möringen (Altm) towards Wolfsburg Hbf | RB 35 | Terminus |
| Preceding station | Hanseatische Eisenbahn | Following station |
| Terminus | RB 33 | Stendal Vorbahnhof towards Tangermünde |
| Terminus | RB 34 | Hämerten towards Rathenow |
| Preceding station | Mittelelbe S-Bahn | Following station |
| Demker towards Schönebeck-Bad Salzelmen | S 1 | Stendal-Stadtsee towards Wittenberge |
Location

Stendal Central Railway Station (German: Stendal Hauptbahnhof) is a railway station in the town of Stendal, Saxony-Anhalt, Germany. The station lies on the Berlin-Lehrte railway, Hanover–Berlin high-speed railway, Magdeburg-Wittenberge railway, Stendal–Uelzen railway, Stendal-Tangermünde railway and Stendal–Niedergörne railway. It is an important railway hub for regional trains and is also used by Intercity and Intercity-Express (ICE) trains regularly. Until the winter 2012 timetable Stendal station was only by Deutsche Bahn trains. Since December 2012, the station has also been served by some services operated by Ostdeutsche Eisenbahn. It is classified by Deutsche Bahn as a category 3 station.

== History ==
On 7 July 1849, Stendal received its first railway connection with the opening of the Magdeburg-Wittenberge railway by the Magdeburg-Wittenberge Company (Magdeburg-Wittenbergeschen Eisenbahn-Gesellschaft). This ran on the eastern outskirts of the town and there was a station at Stendal—later called Stendal Ost (east)—from its opening.

During the course of construction of the Stendal–Uelzen railway and the Berlin–Lehrte railway in 1870, the station was moved to the southern edge of the town to allow passengers to change between the three lines. The Magdeburg-Wittenberge railway was also relocated to be connected to the new station and has run around the town to its west since then. The current station building was also built between 1869 and 1871. It suffered severe bomb damage during World war II, especially on 22 February 1945 due to Operation Clarion and on 7 April 1945.

In April 1886, the Stendal-Tangermünde railway was connected to station.

In June 1892, a horse tramway was opened between the station forecourt and the Uenglinger Tor (Uenglingen gate); in October 1909, another horse tramway was added, but this ran between Stendal Ost station on the original Magdeburg-Wittenberge railway and the Uenglinger Tor. Both tramways were closed in October 1926 and replaced by a bus route.

In the autumn of 1908, the station was connected with the Stendal–Arendsee light railway and, in May 1914, with the Stendal–Arneburg railway after this had been converted from metre gauge to standard gauge. The line to Arendsee was closed gradually from 1978 to 1995. All operations on the line to Arneburg ended in October 1972.

The Stendal–Niedergörne railway was connected to the station in January 1977 to provide a connection to the Stendal Nuclear Power Plant, which was never completed. Since the end of passenger traffic in late 1995, the line has been used only by freight trains.

Stendal was connected to the electrical railway network in 1984 with the electrification of the line to Magdeburg.

Between 1994 and 1998, the Hanover–Berlin high-speed railway was built parallel to the Berlin-Lehrte railway. A southern bypass of Stendal was built against the wishes of the town; this is now used by most long-distance trains running on the line. Nevertheless, the first ICE train stopped at Stendal station on 27 September 1998.

== State ==
The station has five through platform tracks and three bay platforms. Track 1 is located next to the station building and tracks 2–5 are on two island platforms. Bay platforms 6 and 7 are located east and west of the entrance building and are accessible via platform 1. The third bay platform is track 8, which is at the eastern end of the island platform that is faced by tracks 2 and 3. West of the station there is a large parking area.

Buses on several bus routes operated by Stendalbus stop outside the station. There is also a taxi stand.

== Train services ==
Stendal is served by Intercity, Regional Express and Regional Bahn services:

| Line | Route | | | Frequency |
|---|---|---|---|---|
| ICE 10 | Cologne – | Düsseldorf – Duisburg – Essen – Bochum – Dortmund – | Hamm – Hanover – Wolfsburg – Stendal – Berlin – Berlin Ostbahnhof | Individual trains |
| ICE 10 | Cologne – | Wuppertal – Hagen – | Hamm – Hanover – Wolfsburg – Stendal – Berlin – Berlin Ostbahnhof | Individual trains |
| ICE 12 | Zürich ← Basel ← Freiburg ← Karlsruhe ← Mannheim ← Frankfurt – Hanover – Stendal – Berlin – Berlin Ostbahnhof | | | One train pair at night |
| ICE 13 | Stuttgart – | Heidelberg – Darmstadt – | Frankfurt South – Kassel – Braunschweig – Wolfsburg – Stendal – Berlin – Berlin Ostbahnhof | Every 2 hours |
| ICE 13 | Karlsruhe – | Heidelberg – Darmstadt – | Frankfurt South – Kassel – Braunschweig – Wolfsburg – Stendal – Berlin – Berlin Ostbahnhof | Every 2 hours |
| ICE 13 | Frankfurt Airport – | | Frankfurt South – Kassel – Braunschweig – Wolfsburg – Stendal – Berlin – Berlin Ostbahnhof | Every 2 hours |
| IC 57 | Magdeburg – Stendal – Wittenberge – Ludwigslust – Hamburg | | | 1 train pair |
| IC 57 | Leipzig – Halle – Magdeburg – Stendal – Wittenberge – Ludwigslust –Schwerin – Rostock (– Warnemünde) | | | 2 train pairs |
| RE 4 | Stendal – Rathenow – Wustermark – Berlin Hbf - Ludwigsfelde – Jüterbog | | | Every 2 hours |
| RE 20 | (Schönebeck-Bad Salzelmen –) Uelzen – Salzwedel – Stendal – Magdeburg | | | Hourly |
| RB 32 | Stendal – Salzwedel | | | Some trains |
| RB 33 | Stendal – Tangermünde | | | Hourly |
| RB 34 | Stendal – Rathenow | | | Every 2 hours |
| RB 35 | Wolfsburg – Oebisfelde – Stendal | | | Hourly, every 2 hours on weekends |
| S 1 | Wittenberge – Stendal – Magdeburg – Schönebeck – Schönebeck-Salzelmen | | | Hourly |
