= Groß Quassow station =

Railway station in Germany

Groß Quassow
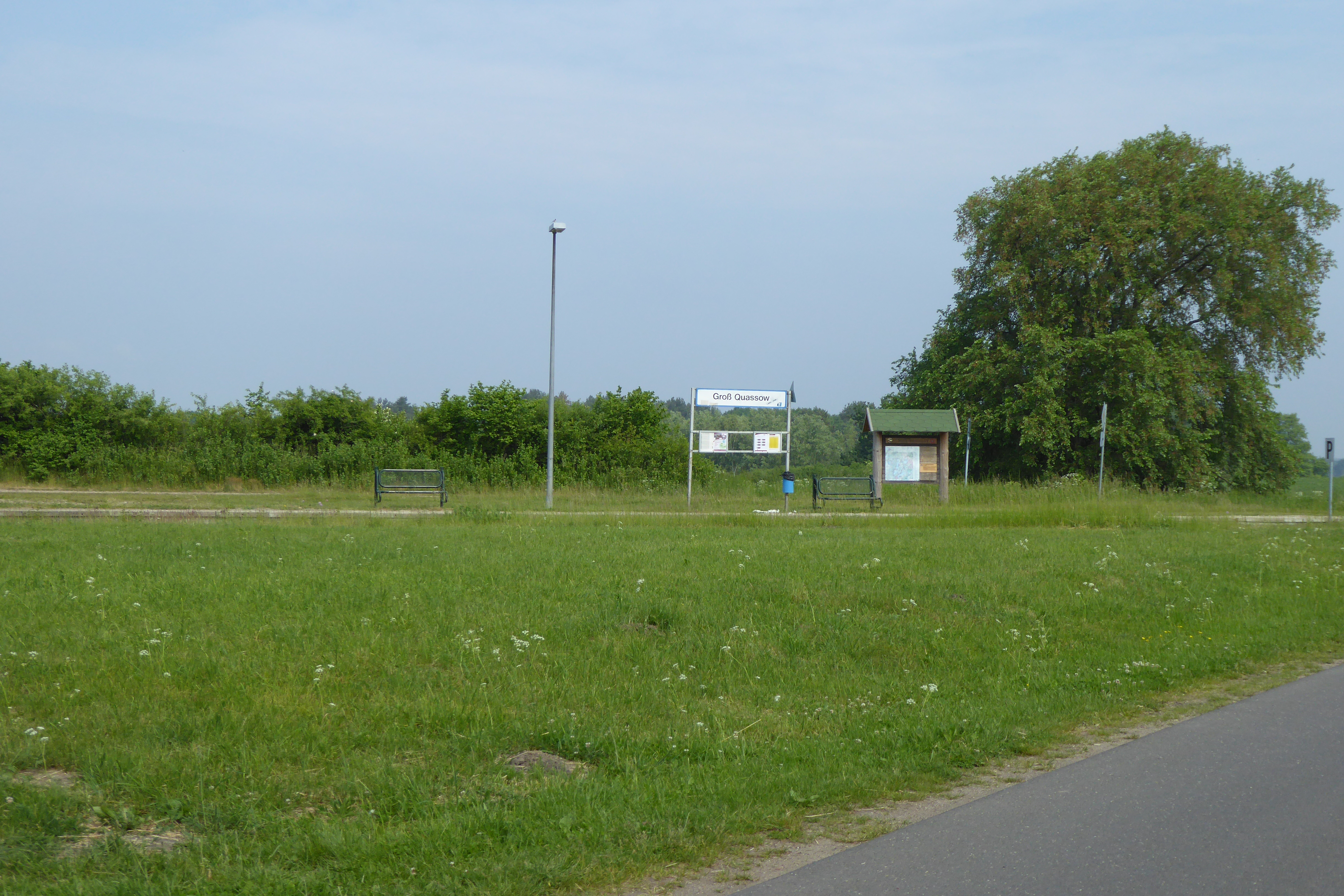
- 2016

General information
- Location: Groß Quassow, Mecklenburg-Vorpommern, Germany
- Coordinates: 53°18′53″N 13°00′17″E
- Line: Wittenberge–Strasburg railway
- Platforms: 1
- Tracks: 1

History
- Opened: 15 July 1890; 136 years ago

Services
Preceding station	Hanseatische Eisenbahn	Following station
Wesenberg towards Mirow	RB 16	Neustrelitz Hbf Terminus
Location
- Location within Mecklenburg-Vorpommern Location within Germany Location within Europe

Groß Quassow (German: Bahnhof Groß Quassow) is a railway station near the village of Groß Quassow, Mecklenburg-Vorpommern, Germany. The station lies on the Wittenberge–Strasburg railway and the train services are operated by Hanseatische Eisenbahn.

== Train services ==
The station is served by the following services:

- regional service (Hanseatische Eisenbahn) Neustrelitz - Mirow
