= Wesenberg station =

Railway station

Wesenberg
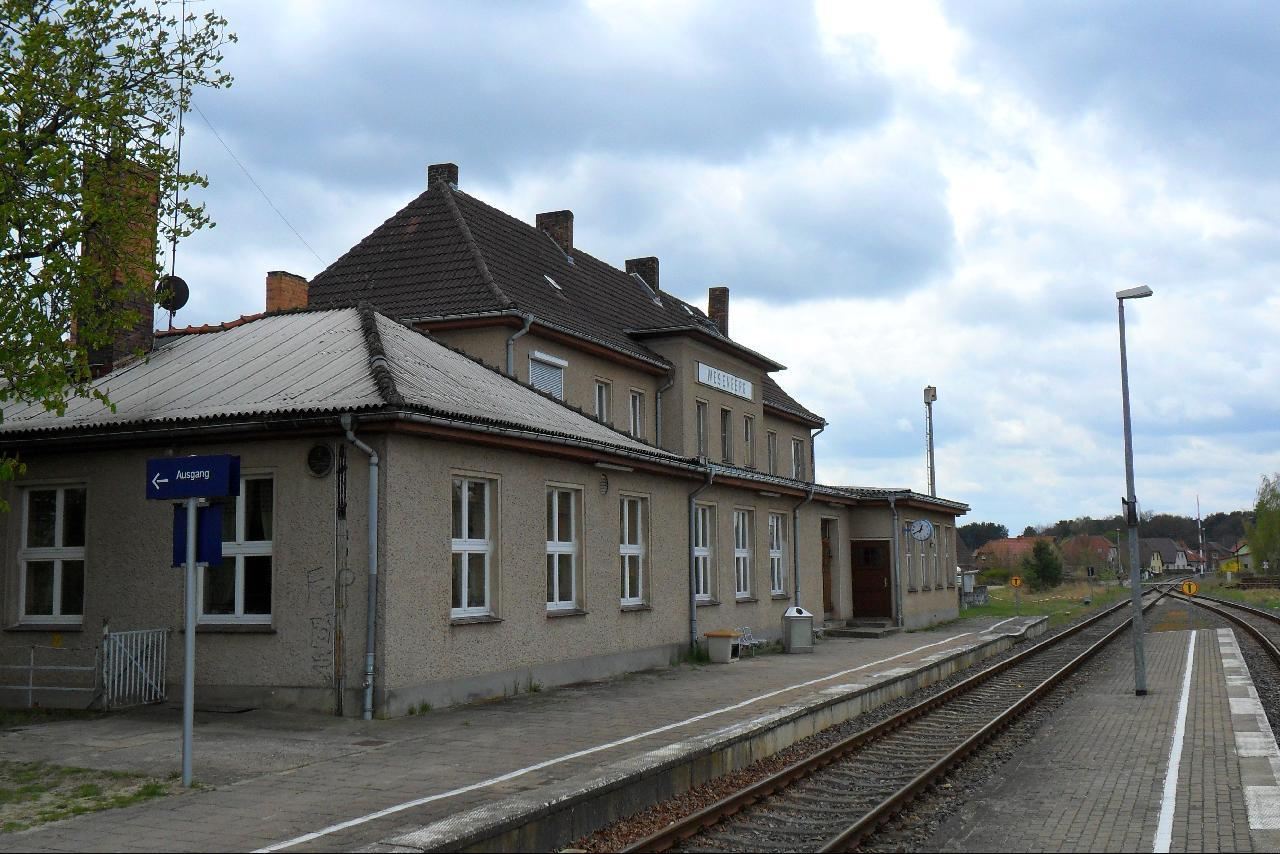
- Wesenberg railway station

General information
- Location: Wesenberg, MV, Germany
- Coordinates: 53°17′11″N 12°57′45″E
- Line: Wittenberge–Strasburg railway
- Platforms: 2
- Tracks: 2

History
- Opened: 15 July 1890; 136 years ago

Services
Preceding station	Hanseatische Eisenbahn	Following station
Weißer See towards Mirow	RB 16	Groß Quassow towards Neustrelitz Hbf
Location
- Location within Mecklenburg-Vorpommern Location within Germany Location within Europe

Wesenberg (German: Bahnhof Wesenberg) is a railway station in the town of Wesenberg, Mecklenburg-Vorpommern, Germany. The station lies on the Wittenberge–Strasburg railway and the train services are operated by Hanseatische Eisenbahn.

== Train services ==
The station is served by the following services:

- regional service (Hanseatische Eisenbahn) Neustrelitz – Mirow
