= Hanseatische Eisenbahn =

Hanseatische Eisenbahn GmbH
- Company type: GmbH
- Industry: Rail transport
- Predecessor: Eisenbahngesellschaft Potsdam (EGP)
- Founded: 2014
- Headquarters: Putlitz, Brandenburg, Germany
- Area served: Brandenburg, Mecklenburg-Vorpommern
- Parent: ENON GmbH

Hanseatische Eisenbahn GmbH (HANS) is a rail transport company that emerged in 2014 from the passenger transport division of Eisenbahngesellschaft Potsdam (EGP). Both companies belong to ENON GmbH, which is based in Putlitz in the northwest of Brandenburg, Germany.

== History ==
In Brandenburg, Hanseatische Eisenbahn operates local rail passenger transport on the branch lines in the Prignitz. On 2 November 2012, the Verkehrsverbund Berlin-Brandenburg (VBB) announced that EGP (from which HANS emerged in 2014) would take over these rail connections for (initially) two years from December 2012. The Meyenburg-Pritzwalk line and Pritzwalk-Neustadt (Dosse) line will be operated with trains of the 504 and 670 series. However, the scope of the operation is significantly smaller than that of Prignitzer Eisenbahn, which previously operated the lines. According to the invitation to tender, EGP was also responsible for developing a concept for the future operation of the lines. Once such a concept had been drawn up, the transport contract could be extended for a further two years in December 2014. For the following period, a further two-year contract was concluded from December 2016 to December 2018. If the neighbouring communities agree, a long-term ten-year contract was planned for December 2018.

For the Neustrelitz-Mirow line, which was cancelled for the timetable change in December 2012, a new operating concept was developed before the end of the last timetable year so that the transition from the previous operator Ostdeutsche Eisenbahn (ODEG) to the Hanseatische Eisenbahn could take place seamlessly. With a reduced offer, the continued operation of the line has been secured since December 2012, with the district of Mecklenburgische Seenplatte now responsible for the task.

Weekend traffic has been offered between Meyenburg and Pritzwalk again since 6 July 2013, after the cities of Pritzwalk and Meyenburg, together with the district of Prignitz, had agreed on a financial contribution. From 6 July to 30 September 2013 and from May to September 2014, individual trips were also offered on Saturdays via Plau am See to Krakow am See in Mecklenburg. Since the weekend services are not ordered at state level, the company's own "EGP house tariff" applied at the weekend, which corresponds to the VBB tariff between Pritzwalk and Meyenburg. Since the timetable change in December 2014, the weekend journeys to and from Meyenburg have been ordered again and VBB tickets are valid without restrictions.

In December 2017, Hanseatische Eisenbahn took over the traffic between Waren (Müritz) and Inselstadt Malchow from Deutsche Bahn. The district of Mecklenburgische Seenplatte had awarded the contract to HANS after negotiations.

One year later, in December 2018, Hanseatische Eisenbahn took over operation of the "Elbe-Altmark" network and then operated the lines Stendal-Tangermünde (RB 33) and Stendal-Rathenow (RB 34). The contract was awarded by VBB and NASA on 14 February 2017. The new contract runs for four years. The LINT 27 railcars used by Transdev Sachsen-Anhalt until then will be used.

== Network ==
=== Current network ===
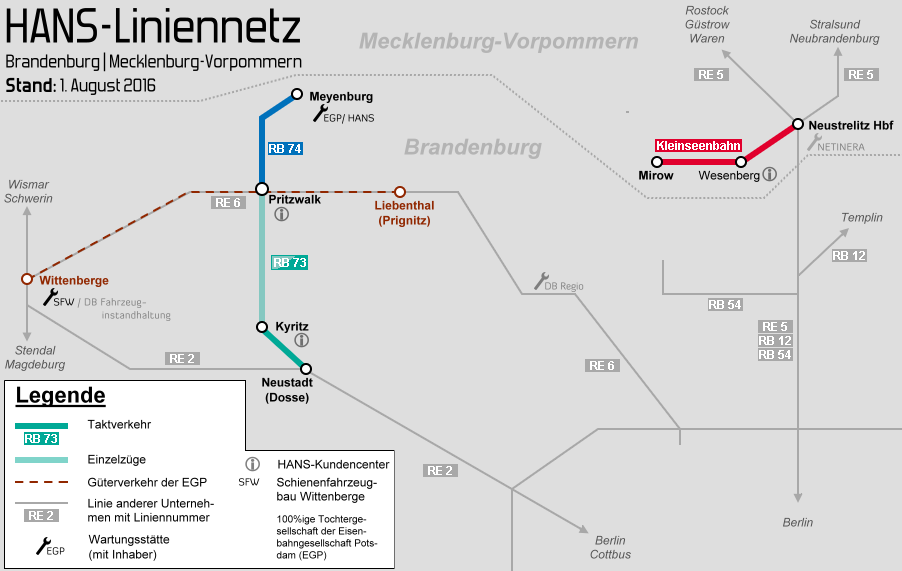
Network map as of 1 August 2016

As of the December 2021 timetable change, the Hanseatische Eisenbahn operates five Regionalbahn (RB) routes in Brandenburg, Mecklenburg-Vorpommern, and Saxony-Anhalt. It also operates the RE 27, a seasonal Saturday-only connection between Bergen auf Rügen and the ferry port at Sassnitz:

| Line | Route | Railway line | Rolling stock |
|---|---|---|---|
| RB 16 | Kleinseenbahn; Neustrelitz Hauptbahnhof – Wesenberg – Mirow | Wittenberge–Strasburg railway | VT 504 and NE 81 |
| RB 33 | Stendal – Stendal Vorbahnhof – Bindfelde – Miltern – Tangermünde West – Tangermünde | Stendal–Tangermünde railway | |
| RB 34 | Stendal – Hämerten – Schönhausen (Elbe) – Großwudicke – Rathenow | Berlin–Lehrte railway | |
| RB 73 | Pritzwalk – Blumenthal (Mark) – Kyritz – Neustadt (Dosse) | Neustadt (Dosse)–Meyenburg railway | VT 504 |
| RB 74 | (Pritzwalk West –) Pritzwalk – Brügge (Prignitz) – Meyenburg | Neustadt (Dosse)–Meyenburg railway | VT 504 and NE 81 |

=== Former network ===
On behalf of the Putlitz-Pritzwalker-Eisenbahnförderverein (Putlitz-Pritzwalk Railway Promotion Association), school transport was provided on the RB 70 line from Pritzwalk to Putlitz. Originally planned only until December 2012, the line operated until summer 2016. The Verkehrsgesellschaft Prignitz (VGP) lost responsibility for bus transport in the Prignitz district on 1 August 2016 following a Europe-wide invitation to tender. The new bus operator will no longer operate the transport services via the RB 70.

The "middle" section of the Mecklenburgische Südbahn (formerly ODEG), which was cancelled in December 2014, was operated independently.

In 2014, a direct connection between Neustrelitz and Plau am See called Seen.land.bahn was offered in cooperation with the Hafenbahn Neustrelitz. The trips were only offered during the season on Thursdays.

| Line | Route | Railway line | Rolling stock | Operation time |
|---|---|---|---|---|
| RB 15 | Waren (Müritz) – Warenshof – Schwenzin – Jabel (Meckl) – Nossentin – Inselstadt Malchow | Mecklenburgische Südbahn | VT 504 | |
| WE 74 | Meyenburg – Plau am See – Krakow am See | Güstrow–Meyenburg railway | 670 | 6 July 2013 – 28 September 2014 |
| | seen.land.bahn Neustrelitz Hauptbahnhof – Waren (Müritz) – Inselstadt Malchow – Karow (Meckl) – Plau am See | | 772 | 26 June 2014 – 30 October 2014 |
| | Mecklenburgische Südbahn; Parchim – Lübz – Karow (Meckl) – Inselstadt Malchow | Mecklenburgische Südbahn | 504 | 14 December 2014 – 30 April 2015 |
| RB 70 | Pritzwalk – Putlitz | Pritzwalk–Suckow railway | 798 | until 31 July 2016 |

== Rolling stock ==
In 2018, Hanseatische Eisenbahn acquired three DWA LVT/S railcars (672 907, 919, 920), which had previously been used by the Burgenlandbahn.

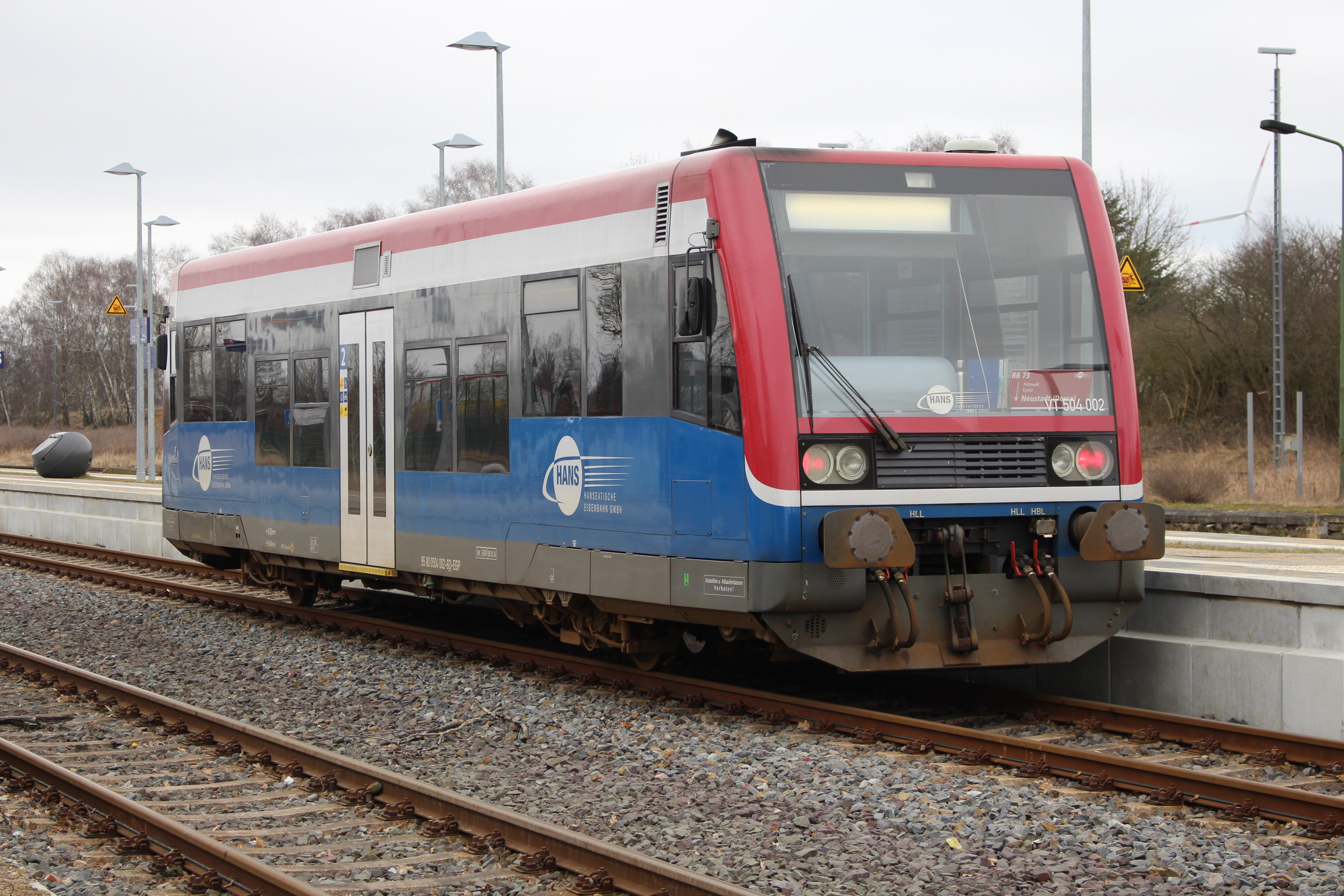
LVT/S at Pritzwalk station

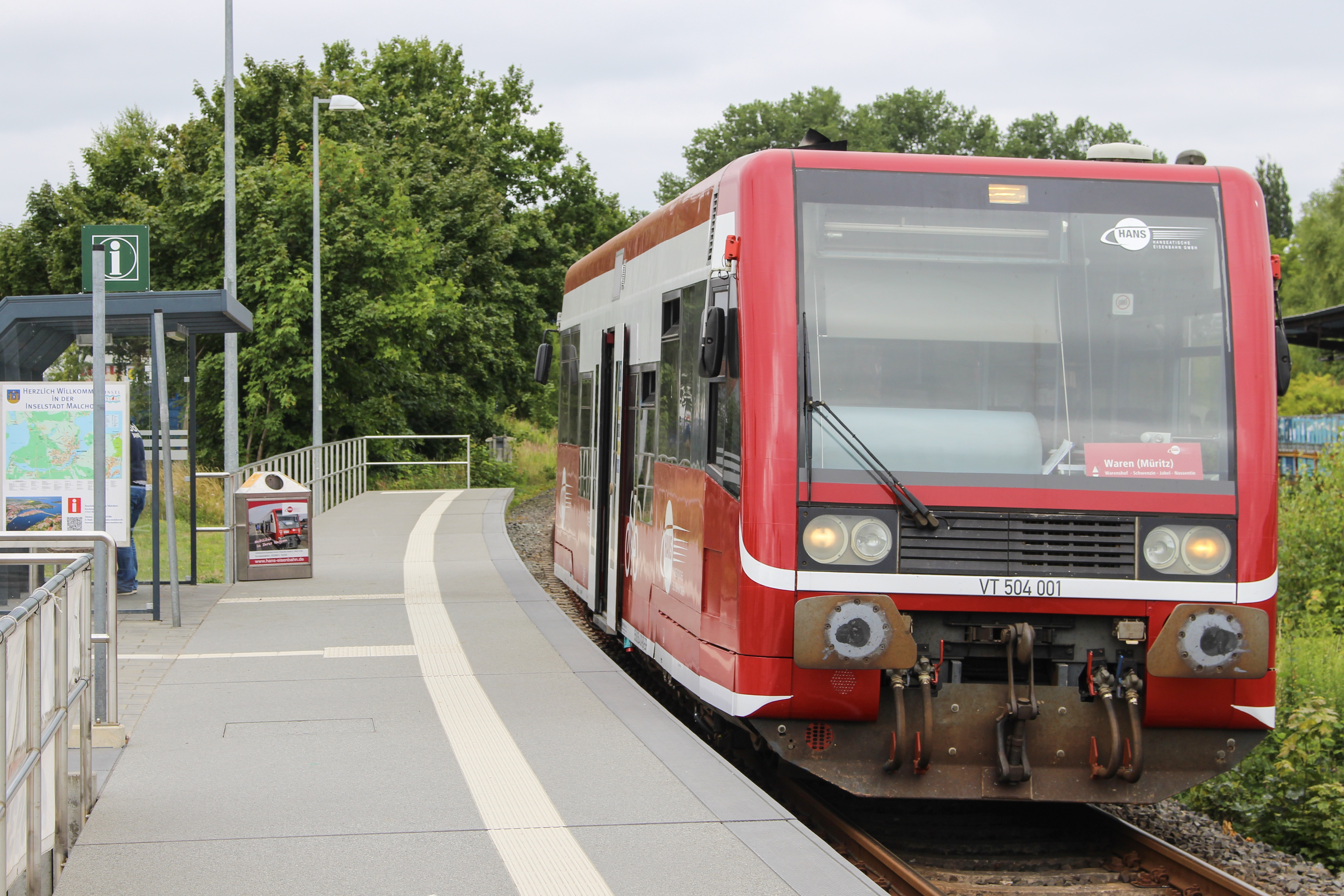
LVT/S at Inselstadt Malchow station

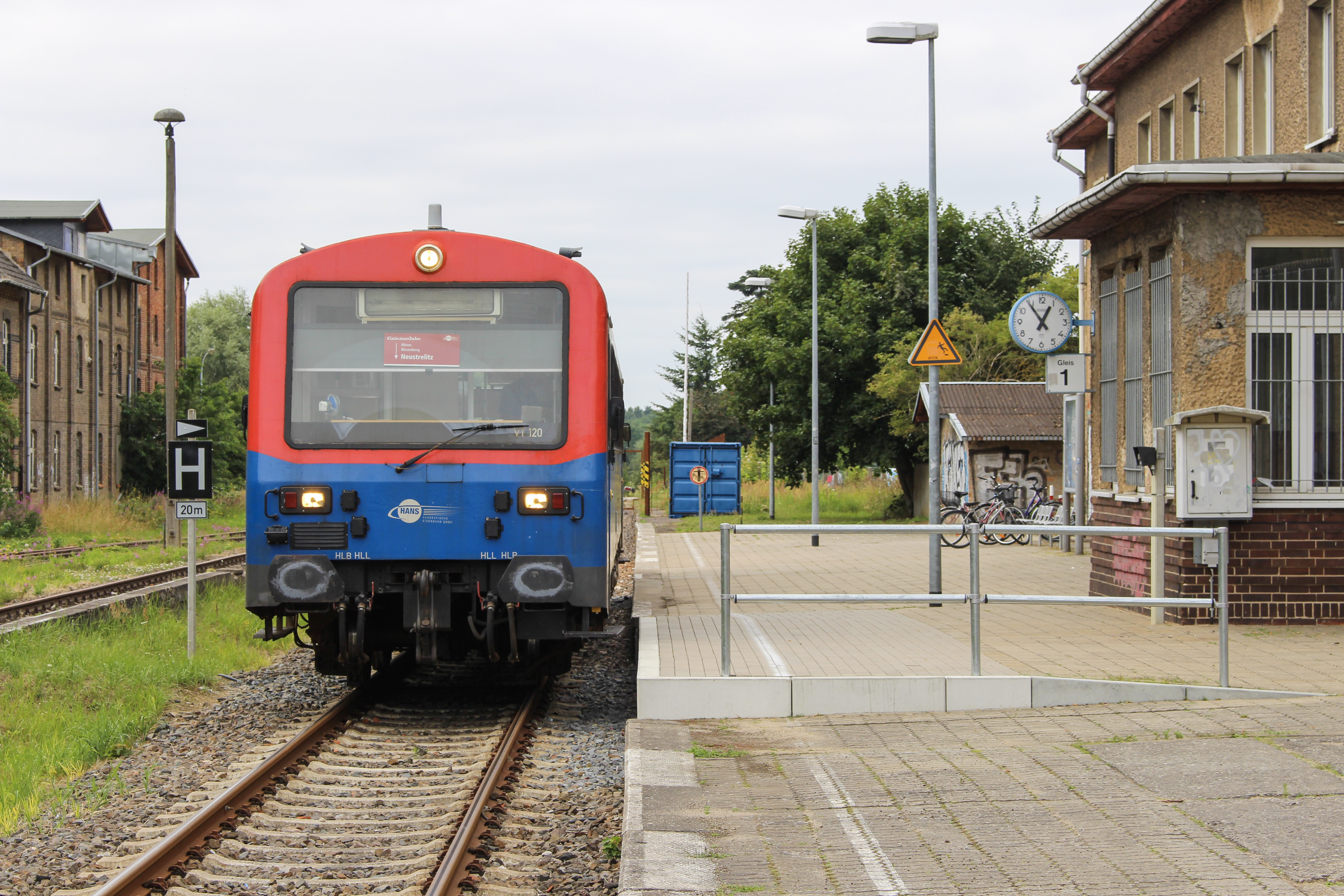
NE 81 at Mirow station

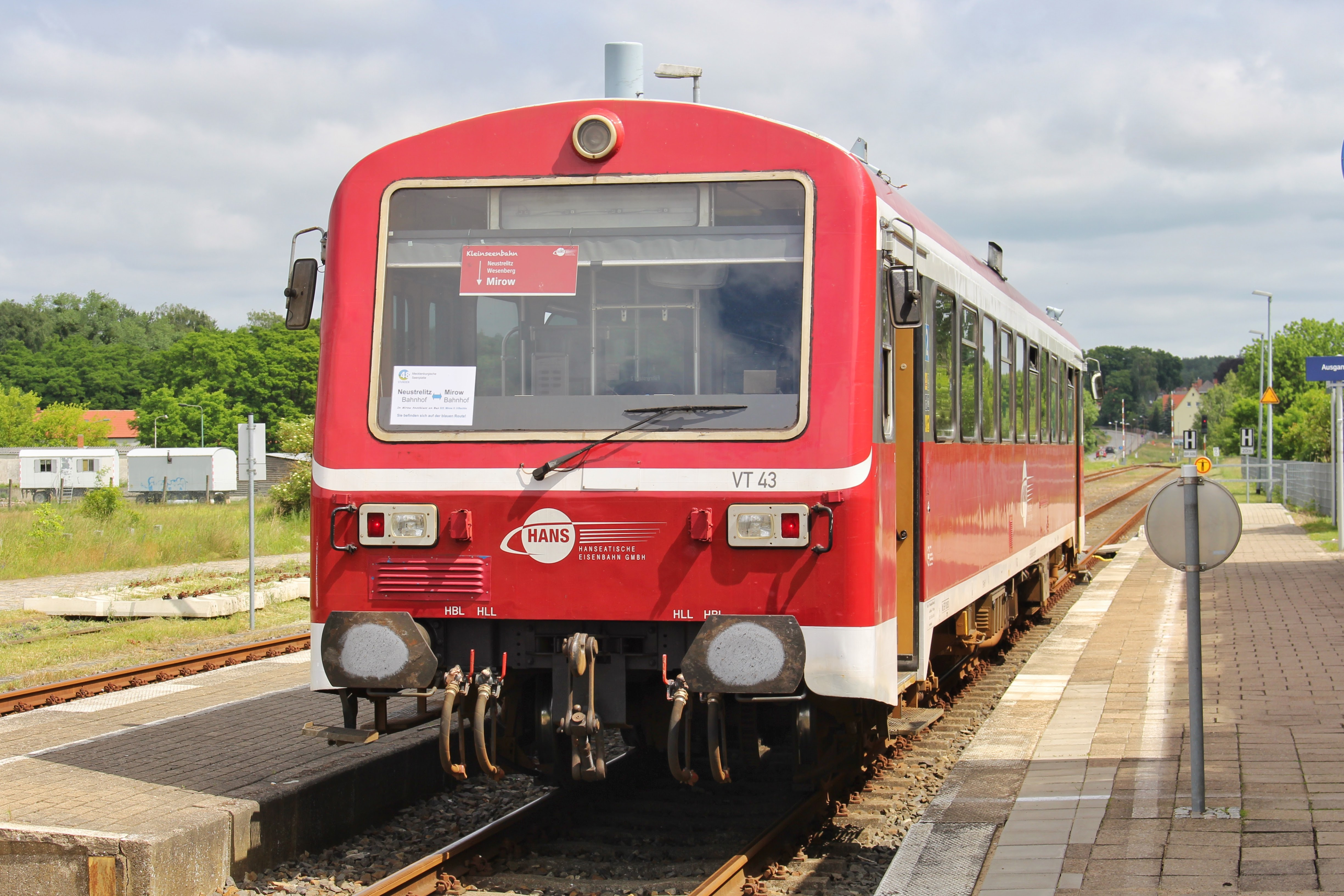
NE 81 at Wesenberg station

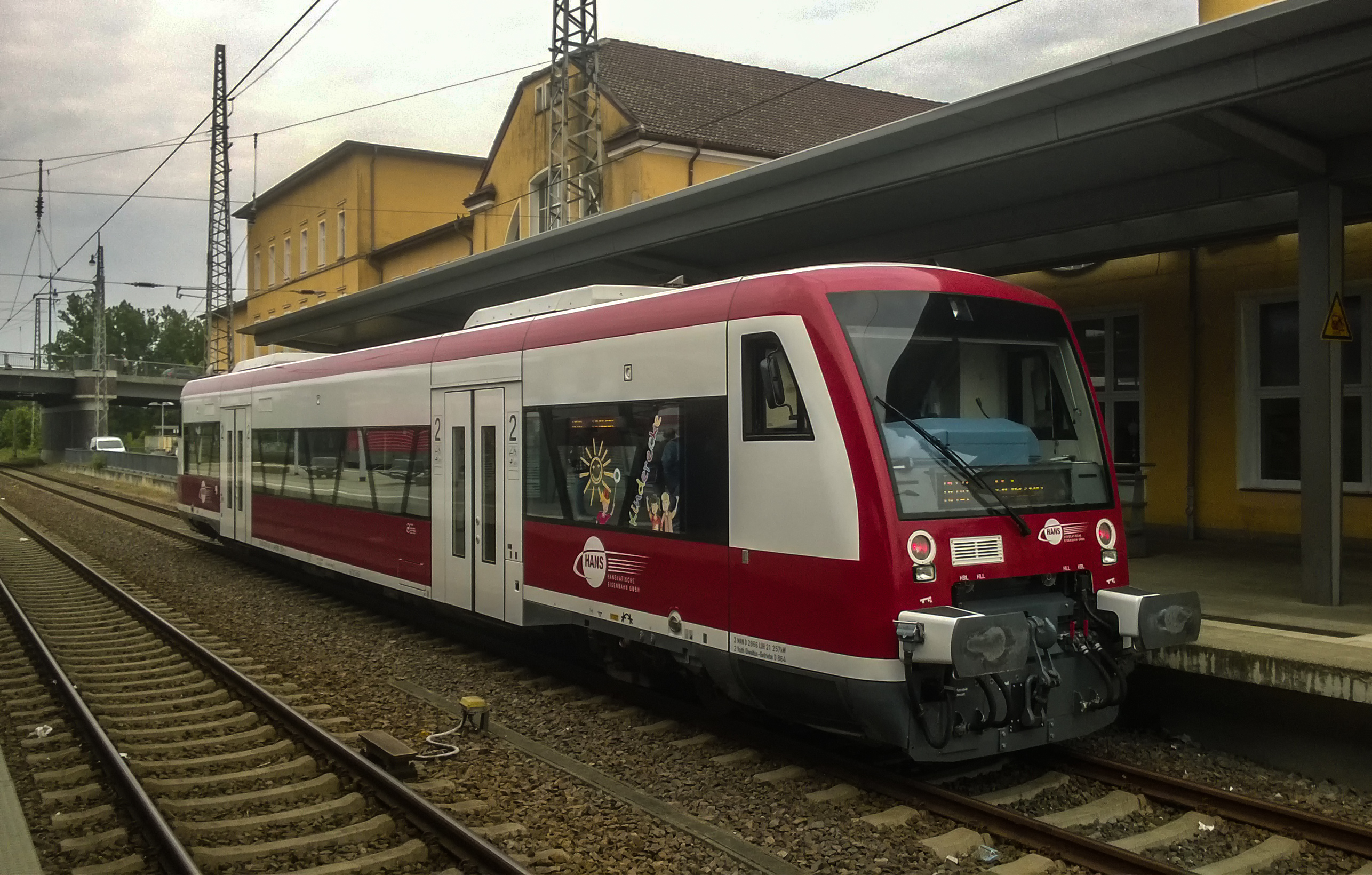
RegioShuttle at Eberswalde Hauptbahnhof

=== Former rolling stock ===
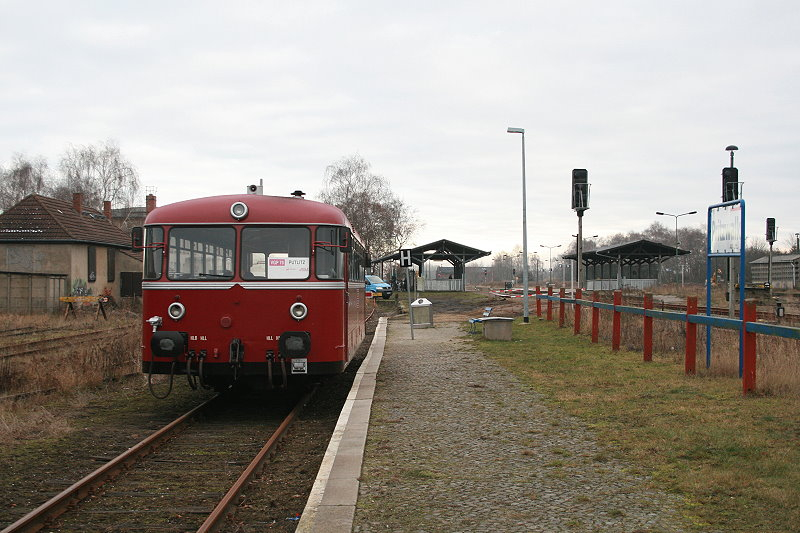
798 610 at Pritzwalk station

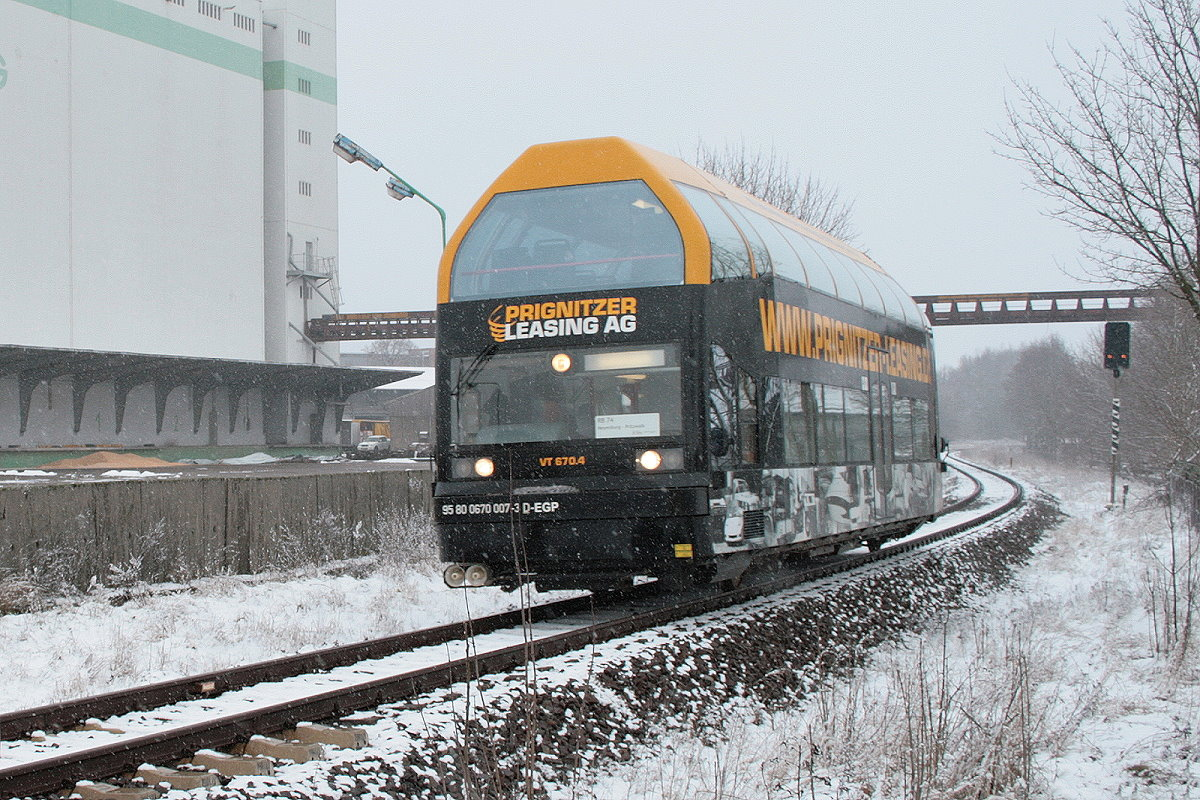
670.4 just before Pritzwalk station
