= Hämerten station =

Railway station in Germany

Hämerten

General information
- Location: Hämerten, Saxony-Anhalt; Germany
- Coordinates: 52.5992°N 11.9714°E
- Line: Berlin–Lehrte (KBS 202)
- Platforms: 2

Other information
- Station code: 2526
- DS100 code: LHMT
- Category: 7

Services
Preceding station	Hanseatische Eisenbahn	Following station
Stendal Hbf Terminus	RB 34	Schönhausen (Elbe) towards Rathenow
Location
- Location within Saxony-Anhalt

Hämerten (German: Bahnhof Hämerten) is a railway station located in Hämerten, Germany. The station is located on the Berlin-Lehrte Railway. The train services are operated by Hanseatische Eisenbahn.

== Train services ==
The station is serves by the following service(s):

- Local services RB 34 Stendal - Rathenow
