= Fürstenberg (Havel) station =

Railway station in Brandenburg, Germany

Fürstenberg (Havel)
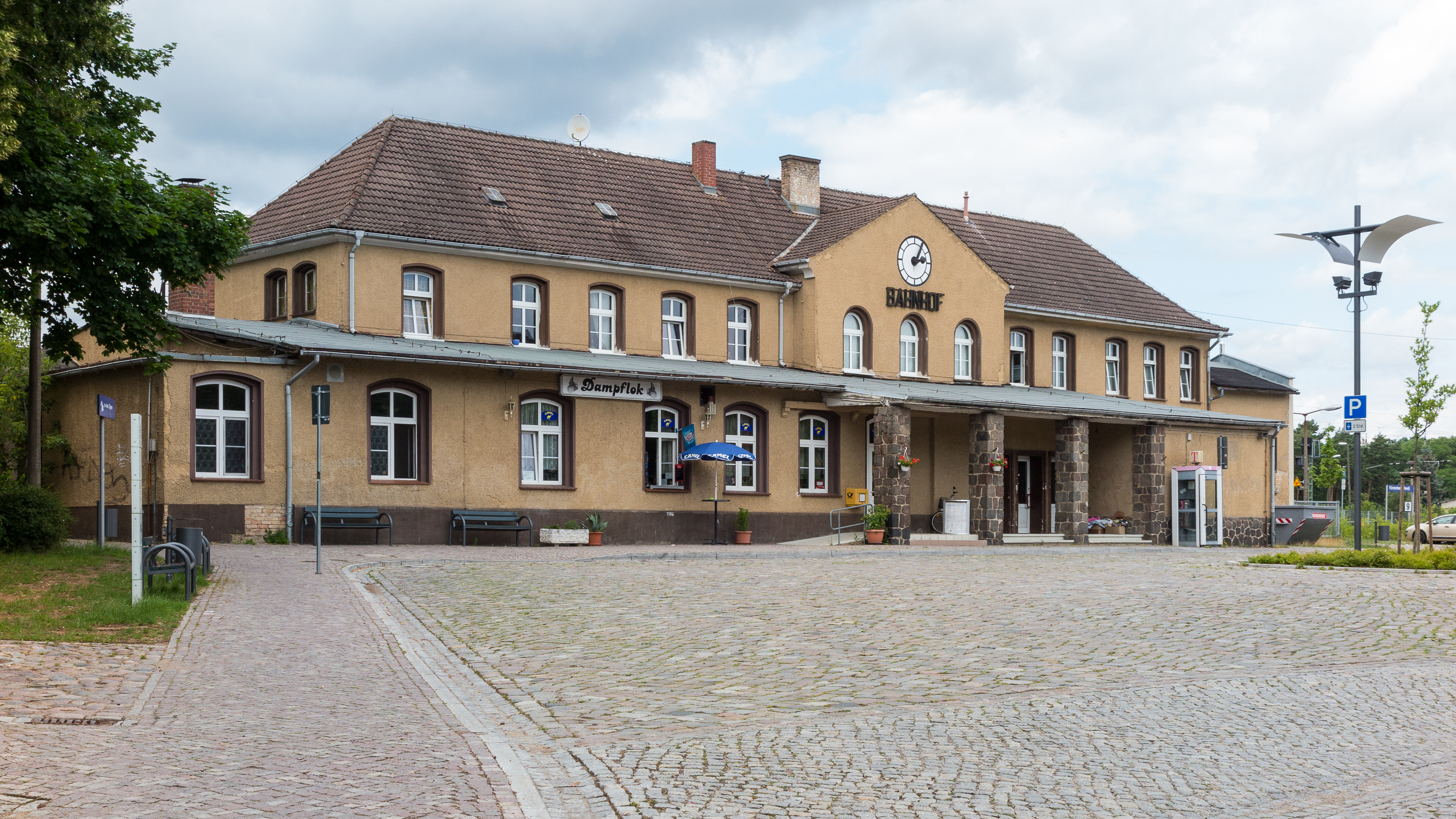
- 2016

General information
- Location: Bahnhofstraße 31; 16798 Fürstenberg/Havel; Brandenburg; Germany
- Coordinates: 53.1867°N 13.1392°E
- System: Bf
- Owner: Deutsche Bahn
- Operator: DB Station&Service
- Lines: Berlin Northern Railway (KBS 205)
- Platforms: 1 island platform 1 side platform
- Tracks: 4
- Train operators: DB Regio Nordost
- Connections: RE 5; 517 838 839 841 846 847 848

Construction
- Parking: yes
- Cycle facilities: yes
- Accessible: partly

Other information
- Station code: 1975
- DS100 code: WF
- IBNR: 8010399
- Category: 5
- Fare zone: VBB: 4052
- Website: www.bahnhof.de

Services
Preceding station	DB Regio Nordost	Following station
Neustrelitz Hbf towards Rostock Hbf	RE 5	Dannenwalde (Gransee) towards Elsterwerda
Neustrelitz Hbf towards Stralsund Hbf	RE 5	Gransee towards Wünsdorf-Waldstadt
Location
- Location within Brandenburg Location within Germany Location within Europe

Fürstenberg (Havel) station (German: Bahnhof Fürstenberg (Havel)) is a railway station in the municipality of Fürstenberg/Havel, located in the Oberhavel district in Brandenburg, Germany.

== Sold station building ==
The station building shown on the picture has been sold to a private individual. It now hosts:

- Rental space for e.g. workshops in the former waiting hall
- A woodworking shop
- The Verstehbahnhof makerspace:

This makerspace is primarily directed towards school groups. It also has:
- 3D-printers
- Lasercutters
- One of the two Jugend hackt (youth hacking organization) headquarters
