= Schönhausen (Elbe) station =

Railway station in Germany

Schönhausen (Elbe)

General information
- Location: Schönhausen, Saxony-Anhalt; Germany
- Coordinates: 52°35′27″N 12°02′14″E
- Line: Berlin–Lehrte (KBS 202)
- Platforms: 2

Other information
- Station code: 5663
- DS100 code: LSH
- Category: 6

Services
Preceding station	Hanseatische Eisenbahn	Following station
Hämerten towards Stendal Hbf	RB 34	Großwudicke towards Rathenow
Location
- Location within Saxony-Anhalt

Schönhausen (Elbe) (German: Bahnhof Schönhausen) is a railway station located in Schönhausen, Germany. The station is located on the Berlin-Lehrte Railway. The train services are operated by Hanseatische Eisenbahn.

== Train services ==
The station is serves by the following service(s):

- Local services RB 34 Stendal - Rathenow
