= Bullowsee =

Lake in Mecklenburg-Vorpommern, Germany

- Location within Mecklenburg-Vorpommern
- Location: Mecklenburgische Seenplatte, Mecklenburg-Vorpommern
- Coordinates: 53°19′3.89″N 12°54′56.88″E
- Basin countries: Germany
- Surface area: 0.16 km^{2} (0.062 sq mi)
- Surface elevation: 60.3 m (198 ft)

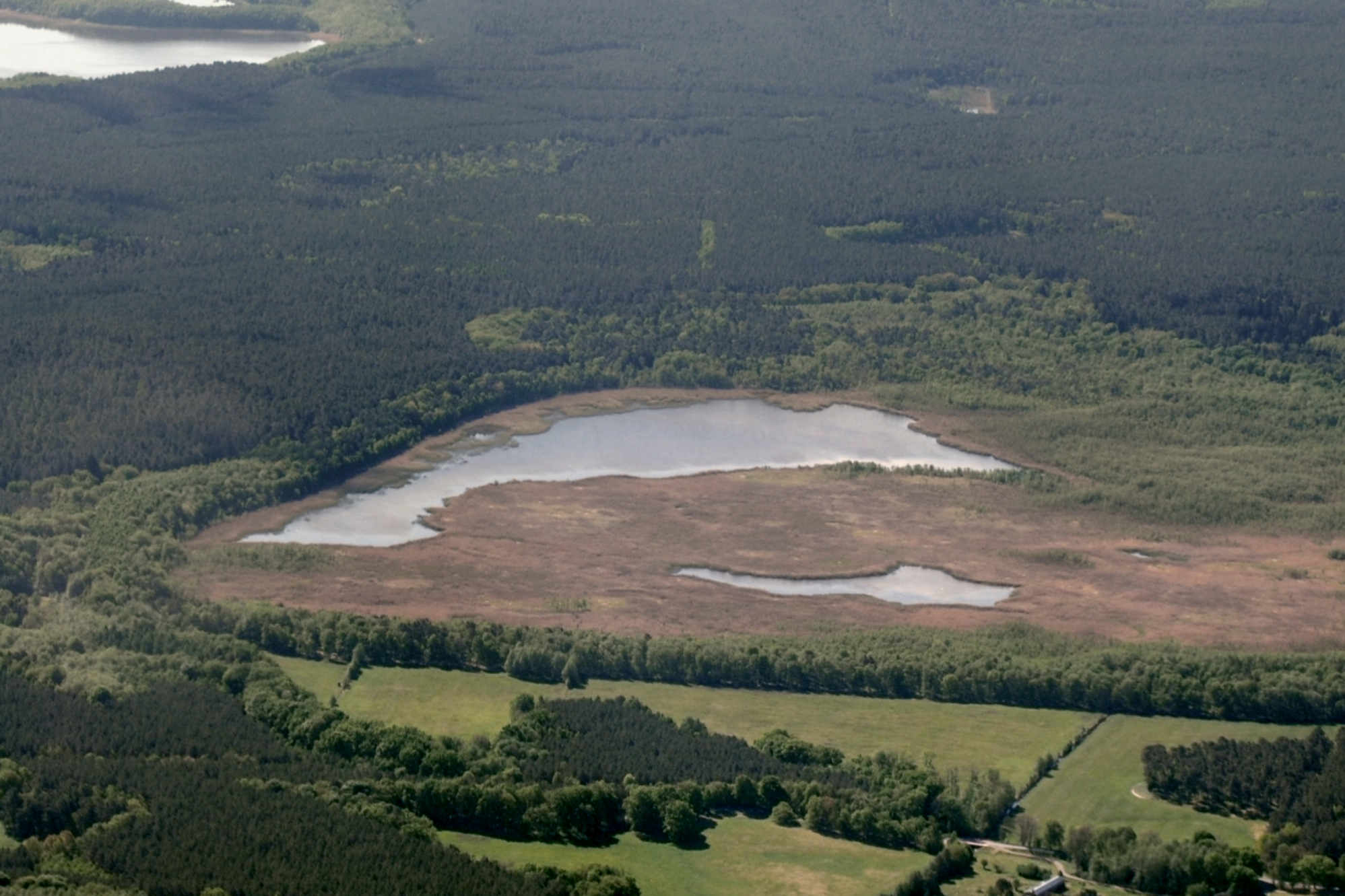
Bullowsee, view from the north.

Bullowsee is a lake in the Mecklenburgische Seenplatte district in Mecklenburg-Vorpommern, Germany. It is located approximately 2.5 km (1.6 mi) southeast from Roggentin in the municipality of Userin, at an elevation of 60.3 m. The lake's west bank flows into a wetland, making its exact surface area difficult to estimate. Its approximate surface area is 0.16 km².

The lake is situated within the Müritz National Park.
