= DB Class 670 =

German double-decker railbus

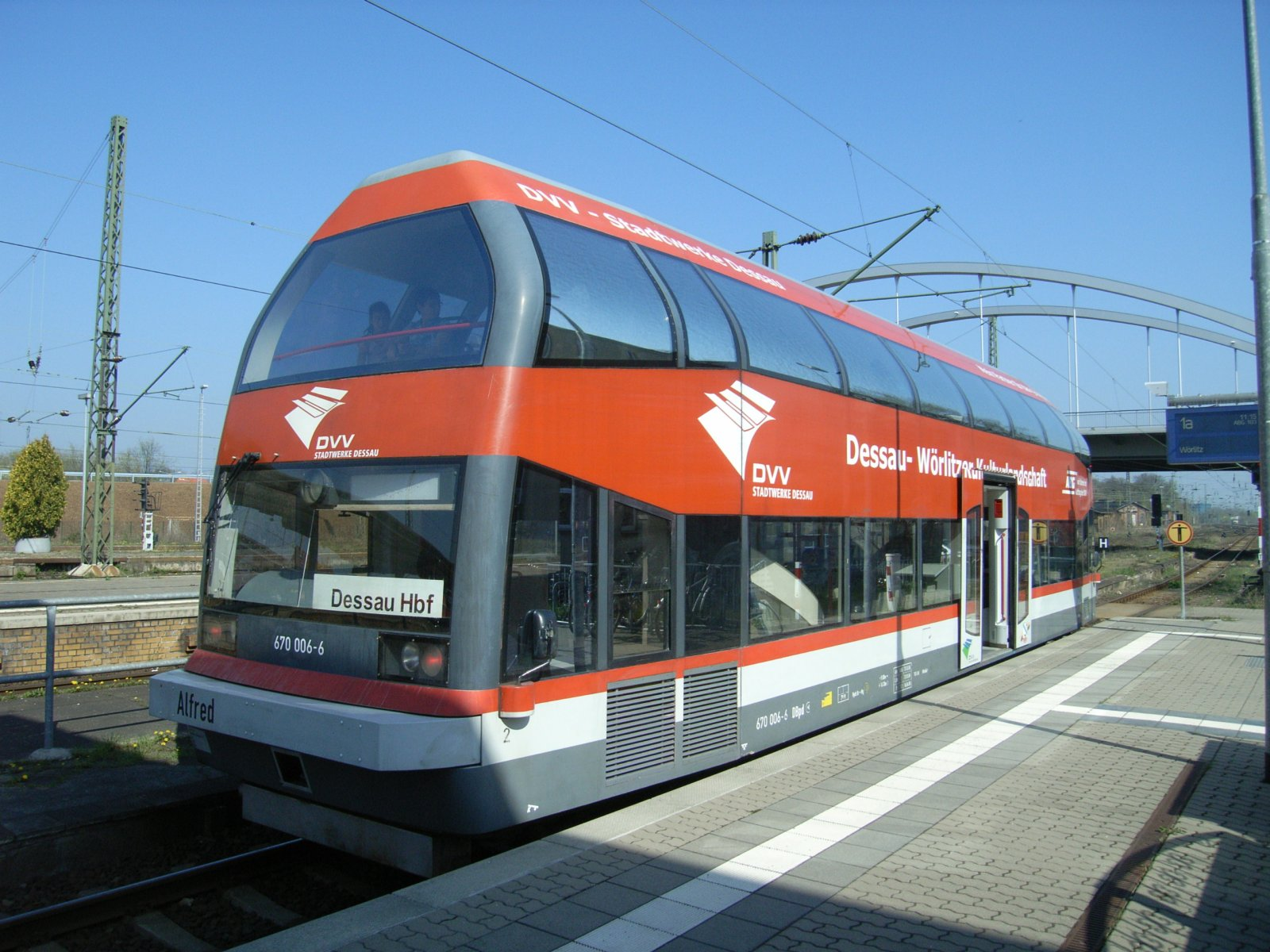
Class 670 of the DVV

The DB Class 670 (German: Baureihe 670) is a double-decker diesel railbus. The vehicles were built by the Dessau and Halle-Ammendorf factories of the Deutsche Waggonbau (DWA). They have two axles and their construction uses some standard motor bus mechanical components.

== Development ==
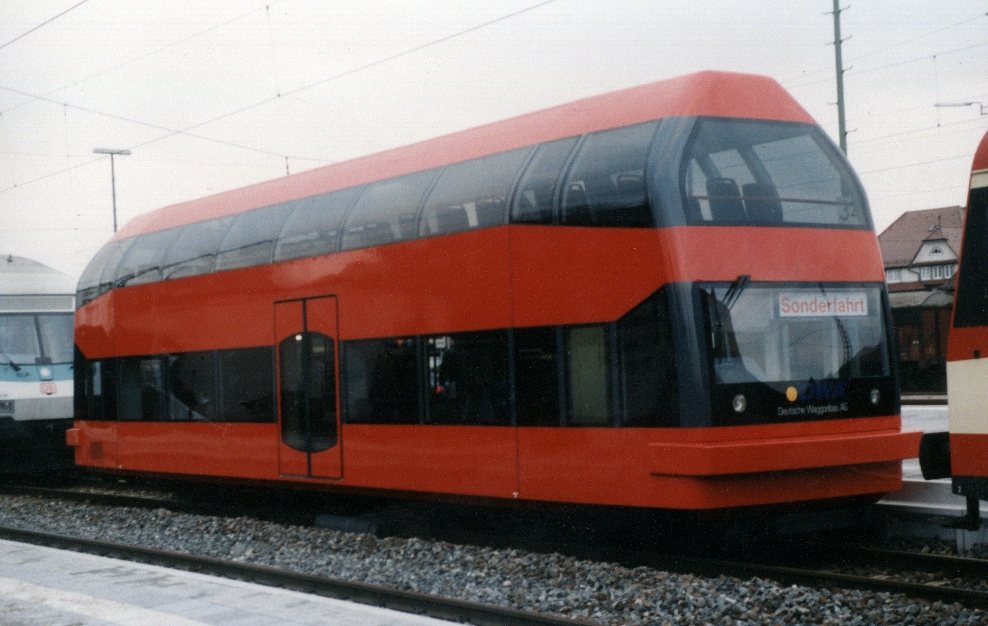
DB 670 Prototype

The underframe is made from light weight steel construction, while the outer shell consists of glued on galvanized panels. The cab ends are made of glass-fibre laminate. Both sides have a double sliding door. Spiral staircases give access to the upper level on the inside.

The first prototype was presented to the public in autumn 1994 and shown at the InnoTrans trade fair in October 1996. This demonstrator unit was painted completely in red and was numbered 670 000. Unlike the six series production rail, the prototype was never licensed for passenger transportation.

== History ==
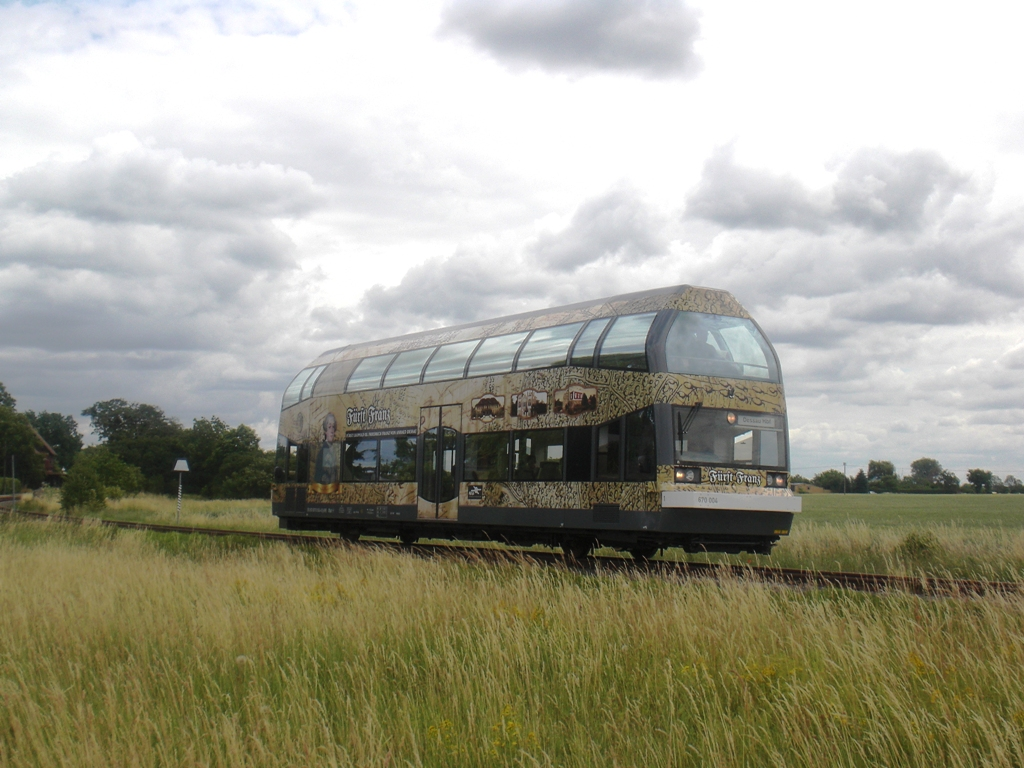
DWE 670 004 Fürst Franz

The series production consisted of six units, which were used from 1996 on the Weimar–Kranichfeld line, Moselweinbahn, and Trier-Perl line. During use problems with air conditioning and engine cooling were observed. The six series cars were initially coloured white with a red stripe, similar to the Intercity Express. Later the color scheme was changed to traffic red (German: Verkehrsrot) (RAL 3020) with a white stripe. A seventh car was started but never finished and scrapped at the factory. A follow-up series of 28 class 670.1, fitted with toilets, was never built, due to the problems with the first series.

On the Bullay–Traben-Trarbach line the railcars were popular with the tourist travellers on the line, but they were taken out of service due to unreliability, being especially prone to hot boxes. The service on the Upper Mosel line Trier-Perl starting in September 1996 was also unsuccessful, as the cars were too small for the transport of school pupils and did not have onboard toilets.

Service in Thuringia also ended quickly because the steep gradients on the Weimar–Kranichfeld line caused reliability problems with the railcars' lightweight transmission. The class 670 were replaced by older Class 771/772 railcars.

The only successful long-term service of the class 670 by Deutsche Bahn was on the Stendal-Tangermünde line. From 1999 car 670 002, named Alma remained in use until March 2003.

Between 1991 and 2003 the class 670 cars were returned by Deutsche Bahn to the manufacturer, which had been part of Bombardier Transportation since 1998. The cars were refurbished and resold to new operators.

Two cars, 670 005 and 006, were sold to the Dessau-Wörlitzer Railway where they have since been extensively refurbished with new engines and new air conditioning systems. 670 005 was named Fürst Franz and 670 006 Fürstin Louise. 670 005 was removed from service in 2017. It is used as a parts donor for 670 006 Fürstin Louise, which is supposed to be overhauled in 2020 and will then be used for special trains and as a backup car. The main traffic on the line will be served by class 672 cars of the Burgendlandbahn.

The remaining three cars 670 001, 003 and 004 were sold to the Prignitzer Eisenbahn GmbH. 670 001 was used for spare parts and cars 670 003 and 004 were later sold to the Eisenbahngesellschaft Potsdam and have been used on lines in the Prignitz region since 2008.

The prototype 670 000 was temporarily owned by the Traditionsgemeinschaft Ferkeltaxi e.V. and sold to a private owner in Oelsnitz. Car 670 002 was bought by the Traditionsgemeinschaft Ferkeltaxi e.V. as a substitute and is used for special trains.

== Overview ==
Car	UIC number	Current owner	Name	Remark
670 000	--	Dresden Transport Museum		Demonstrator, never licensed for passenger service
670 001	--	Prignitzer Eisenbahn GmbH		parked at Arriva works in Neustrelitz until scrapped in 2014
670 002	95 80 0670 002-4 D-KSR	Traditionsgemeinschaft Ferkeltaxi e.V. (SEM Chemnitz)	Alma	Grey paint scheme
670 003	95 80 0670 006-5 D-EGP	Hanseatische Eisenbahn GmbH		Numbered as 670.3; parked in Meyenburg (as of: November 2020)
670 004	95 80 0670 007-3 D-EGP	Hanseatische Eisenbahn GmbH		Numbered as 670.4; parked in Putlitz (as of: November 2020)
670 005	95 80 0670 004-0 D-DVE	Dessauer Verkehrs- und Eisenbahngesellschaft mbH	Fürst Franz (formerly Elfriede)	Dessauer Verkehrs- und Eisenbahngesellschaft, Numbered as 670 004; parked as parts donor
670 006	95 80 0670 003-2 D-DVE	Dessauer Verkehrs- und Eisenbahngesellschaft mbH	Fürstin Louise (formerly Alfred)	Dessauer Verkehrs- und Eisenbahngesellschaft, numbered 670 003; parked

== Gallery ==
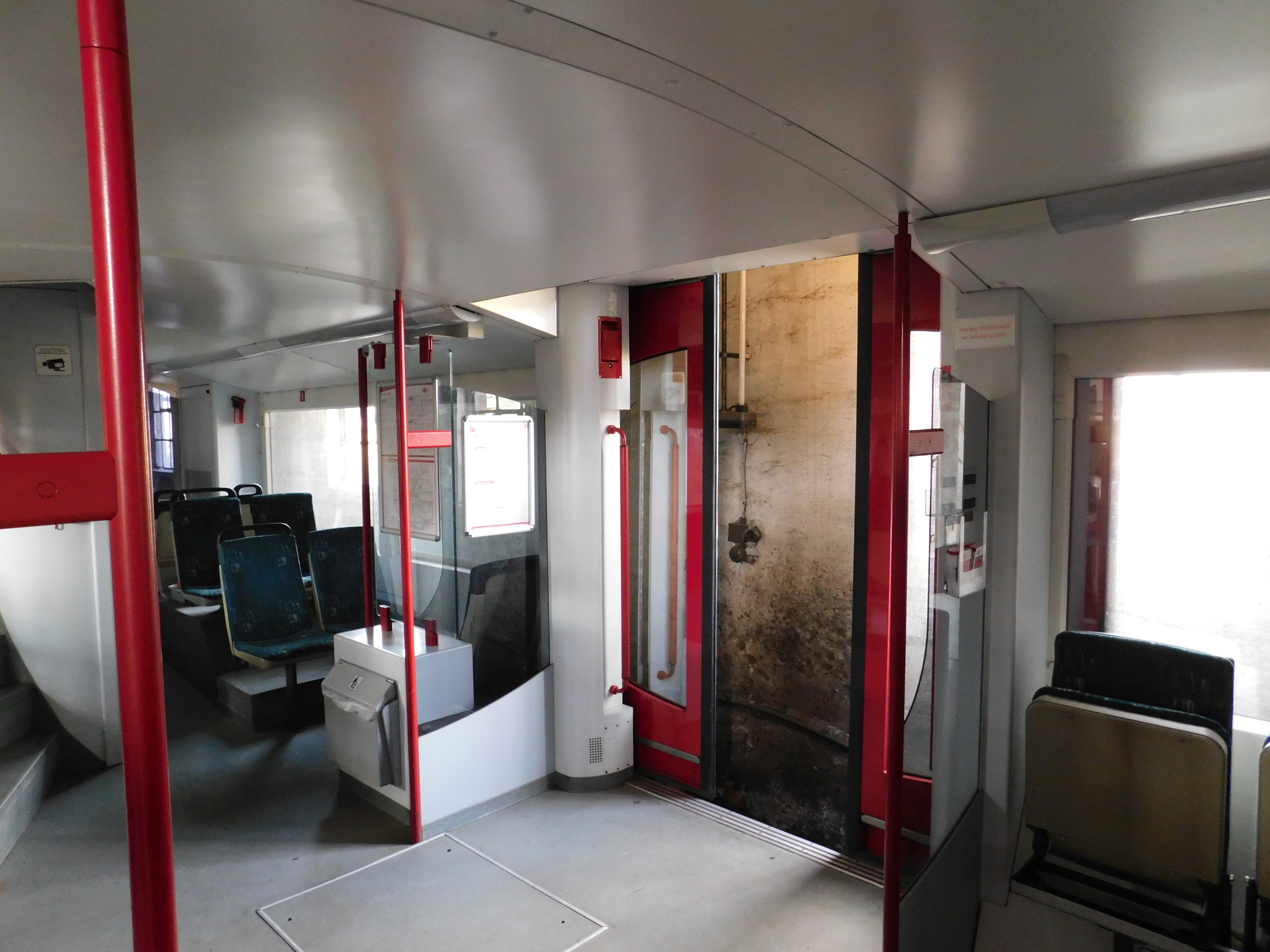
Interior of the lower deck

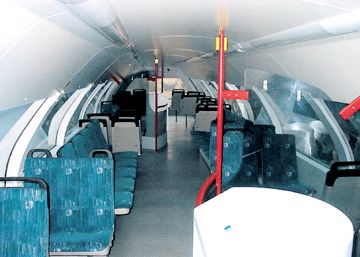
Interior of the upper deck

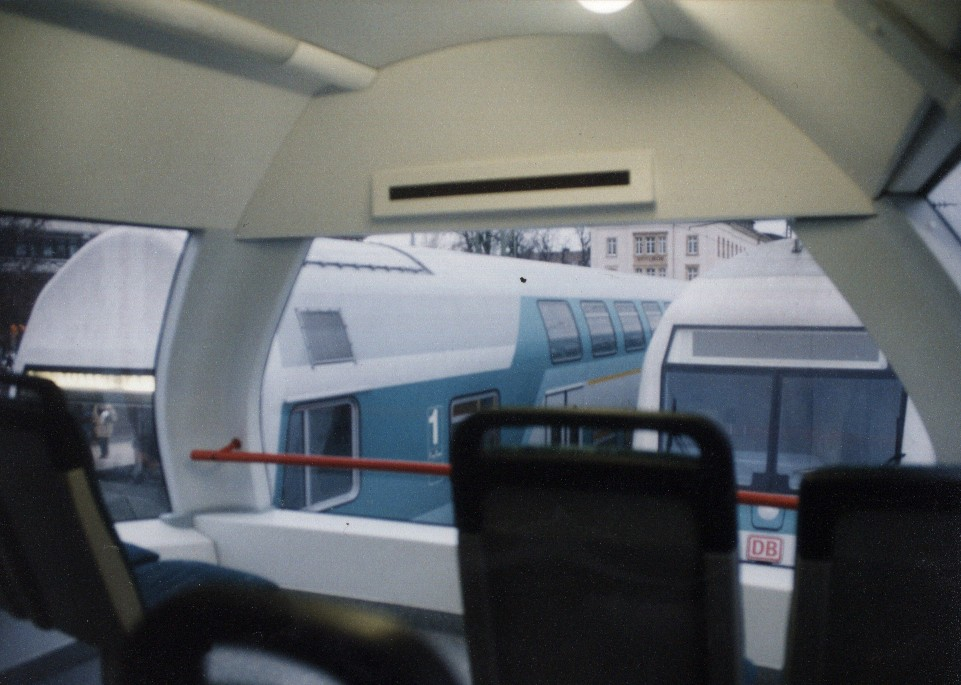
View from the car end

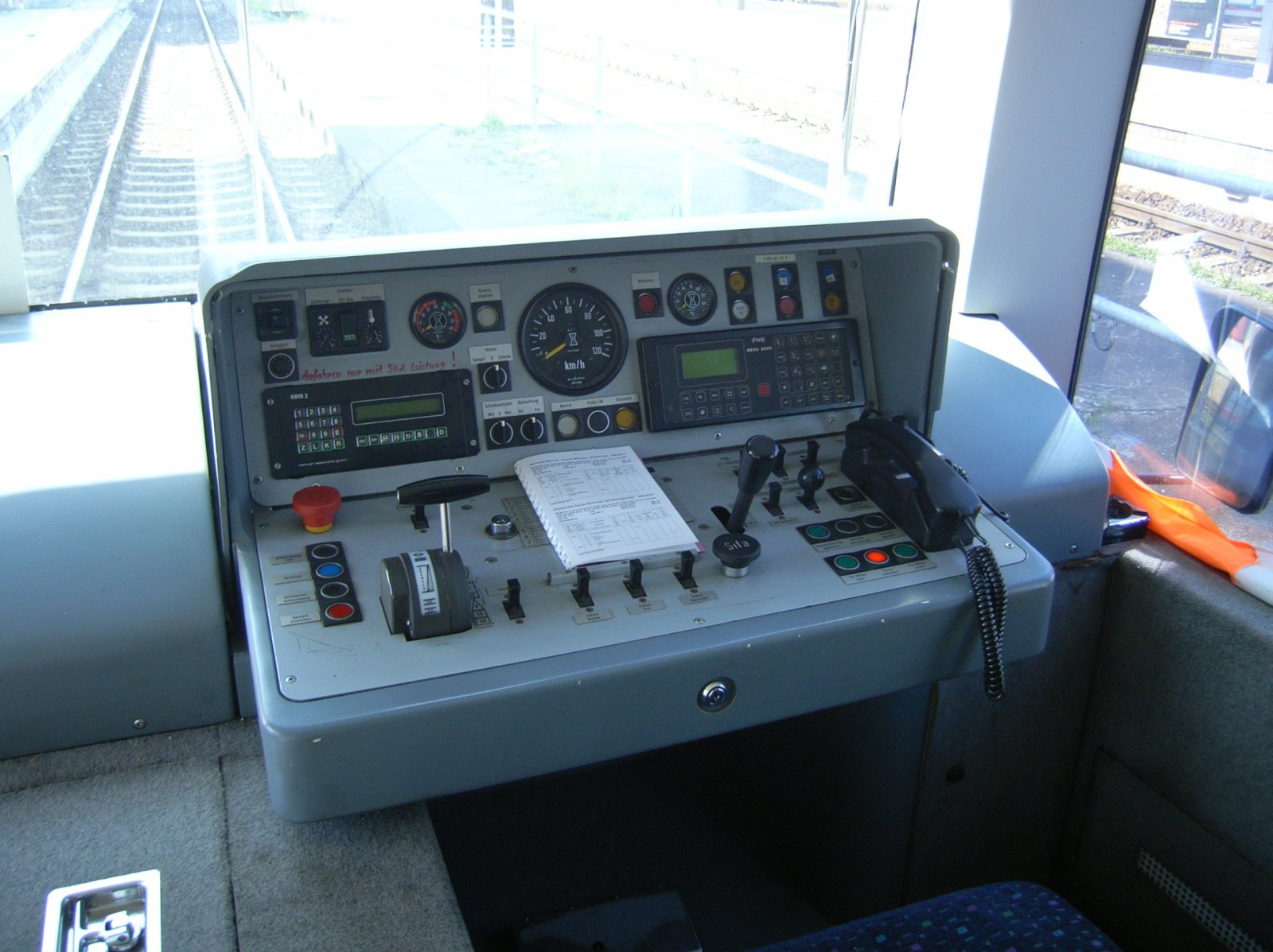
Driving cab

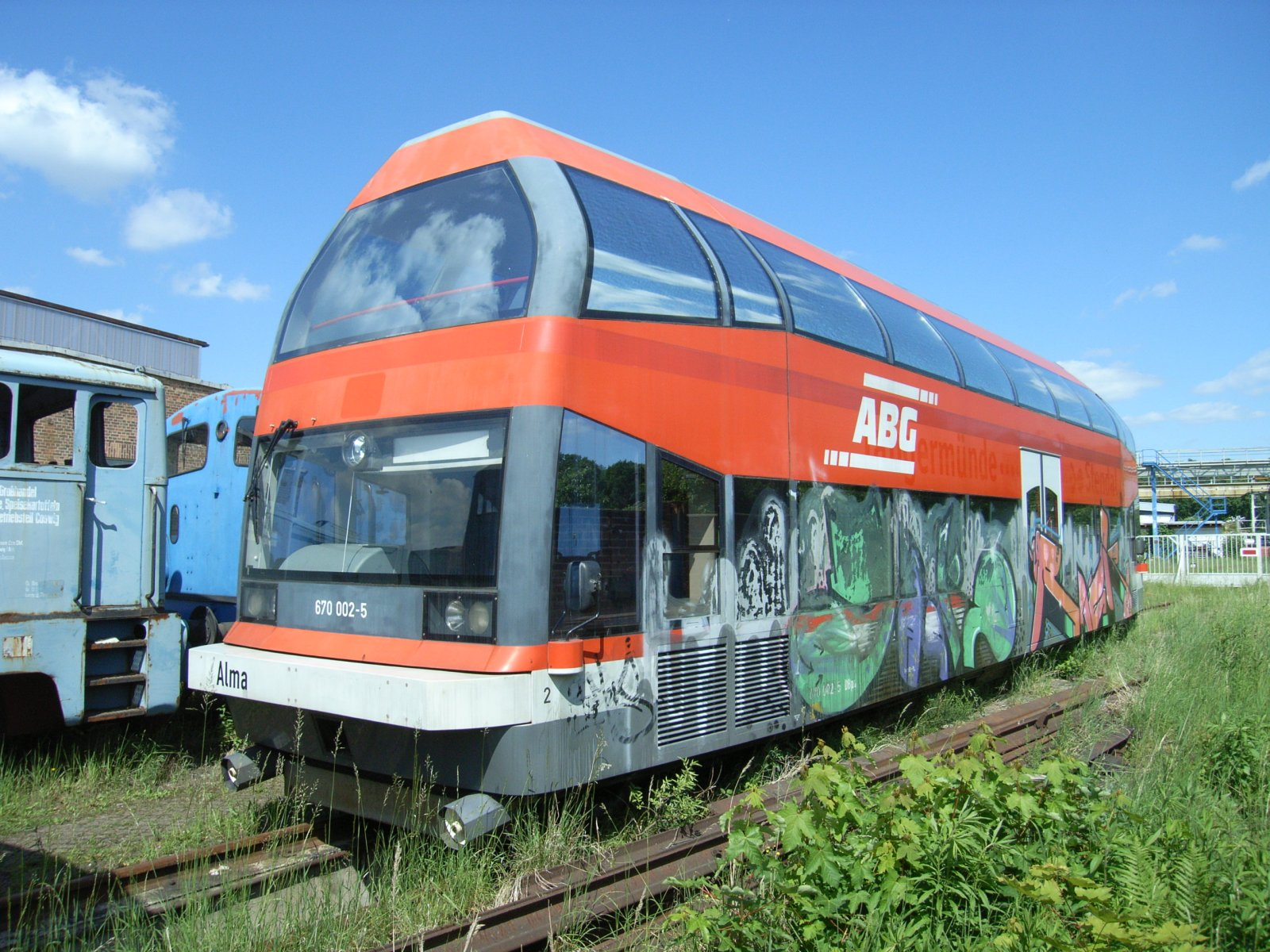
670 002 Alma

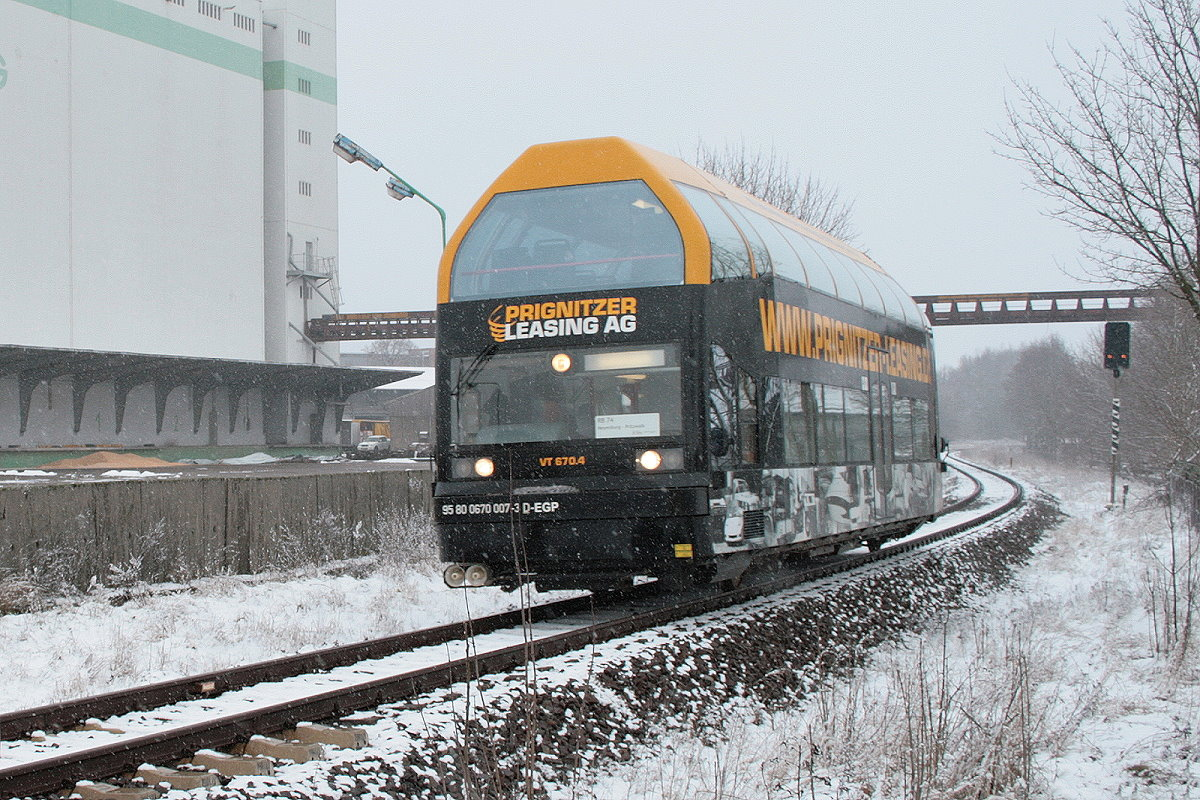
670 007, ex 670 004, in use at the EGP

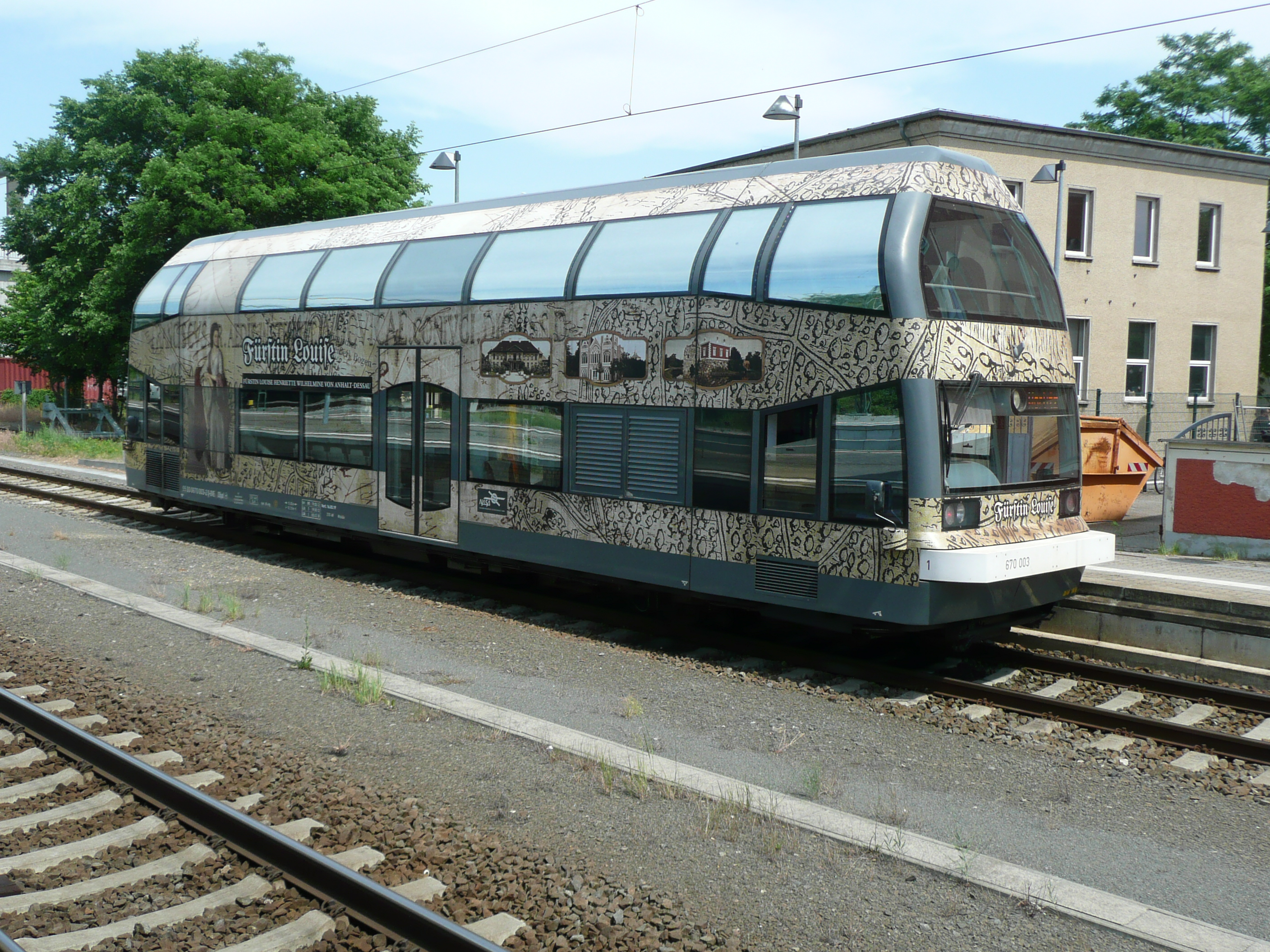
670 003 Fürstin Louise, ex 670 006

== Literature ==
- Jürgen Lorenz: Baureihe 670 vor der Fertigstellung. In: Eisenbahn-Kurier. Nr. 281/Jahrgang 30/1996. EK-Verlag GmbH, ISSN 0170-5288, S. 44–45.
- Matthias Honigmann: Die Doppelstockschienenbusse der Baureihe 670 (96 Seiten). Verlag Dirk Endisch. 1. Auflage Stendal 2017. ISBN 978-3-936893-95-3
