= Käbelicksee =

Lake in Germany

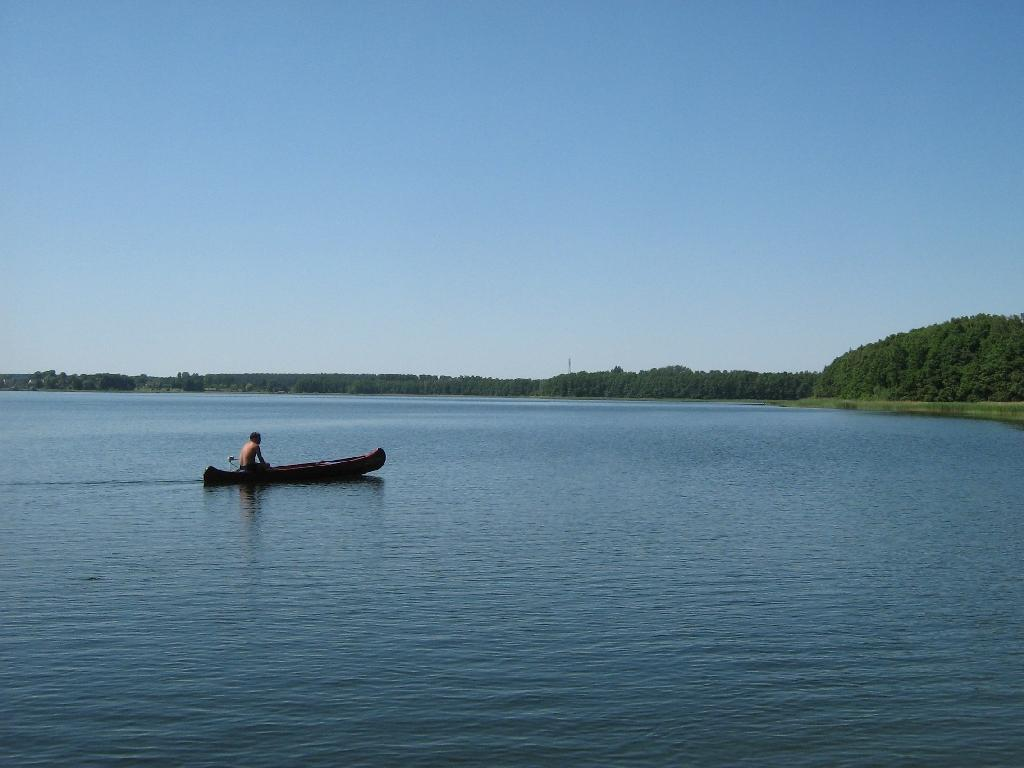
- Käbelicksee, Müritz National Park, Germany

- Location within Mecklenburg-Vorpommern
- Location: Mecklenburgische Seenplatte, Mecklenburg-Vorpommern
- Coordinates: 53°25′2.31″N 12°56′33.29″E
- Primary inflows: Havel
- Primary outflows: Havel
- Basin countries: Germany
- Max. length: 2.51 km (1.56 mi)
- Max. width: 1.508 km (0.937 mi)
- Surface area: 2.64 km^{2} (1.02 sq mi)
- Average depth: 3.4 m (11 ft)
- Max. depth: 12.6 m (41 ft)
- Water volume: 8,900,000 m^{3} (310,000,000 cu ft)
- Shore length^{1}: 11.3 km (7.0 mi)
- Surface elevation: 62.4 m (205 ft)
- ^{1} Shore length is not a well-defined measure.

Käbelicksee is a lake in the Mecklenburgische Seenplatte district in Mecklenburg-Vorpommern, Germany.

It is part of the Müritz National Park. At an elevation of 62.4 m, its surface area is 2.64 km^{2}.
