= Großwudicke station =

Railway station in Milower Land, Germany

Großwudicke

General information
- Location: Am Bahnhof 2; 14715 Milower Land/OT Großwudicke; Brandenburg; Germany
- Coordinates: 52°35′25″N 12°13′52″E
- Owner: DB Netz
- Operator: DB Station&Service
- Lines: Berlin–Lehrte railway (KBS 204)
- Platforms: 1 side platform
- Tracks: 2
- Train operators: Hanseatische Eisenbahn

Other information
- Station code: 2372
- DS100 code: LGWU
- IBNR: 8011766
- Category: 7
- Website: www.bahnhof.de

Services
Preceding station	Hanseatische Eisenbahn	Following station
Schönhausen (Elbe) towards Stendal Hbf	RB 34	Rathenow Terminus
Location
- Location within Brandenburg Location within Germany Location within Europe

Großwudicke (German: Bahnhof Großwudicke) is a railway station located in Großwudicke, Milower Land, Germany. The station is located on the Berlin-Lehrte Railway. The train services are operated by Hanseatische Eisenbahn.

== Train services ==
The station is serves by the following service(s):

- Local services RB 34 Stendal - Rathenow
