= DWA LVT/S =

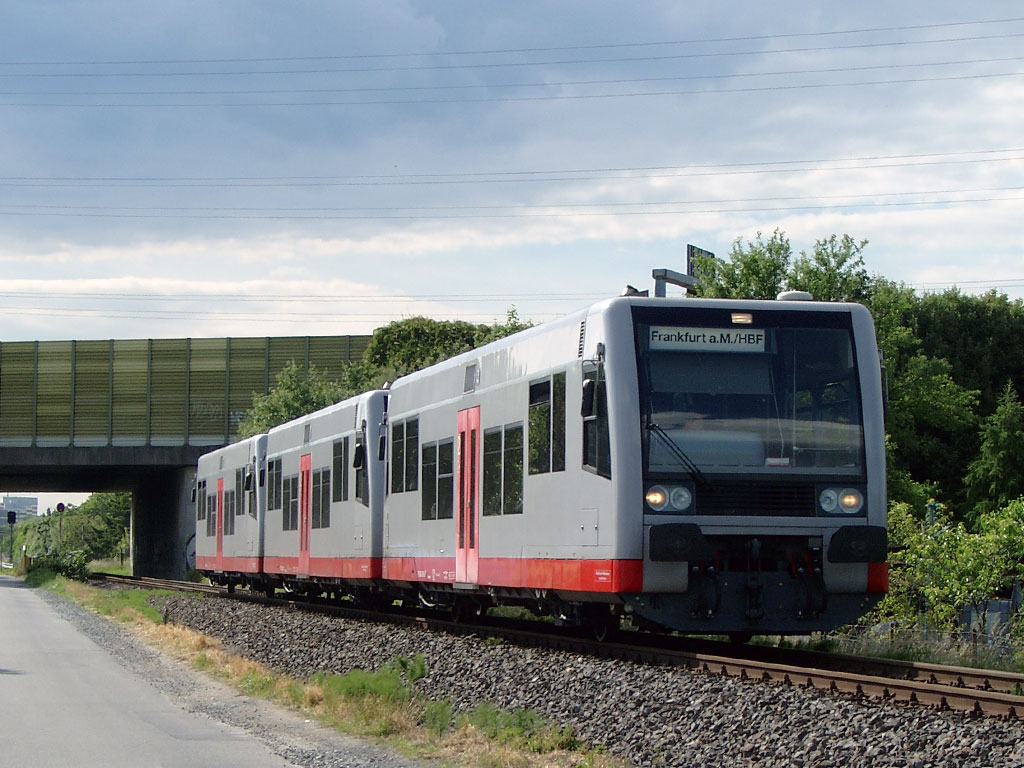

DWA LVT/S is a diesel multiple unit for regional traffic with low-floor entry.

== History ==
In 1996, Deutsche Waggonbau designed the double-decker DB Class 670, which, however, did not satisfy its operational requirements. As an alternative, the DWA developed the single-deck railcar LVT/S (DBAG Class 672), which was designed to be more robust and suitable for full-track use. With the acquisition of DWA by Bombardier Transportation a further construction was omitted as well as an extension of the vehicle range to a control car or a twin-railcar variant.

== Service ==
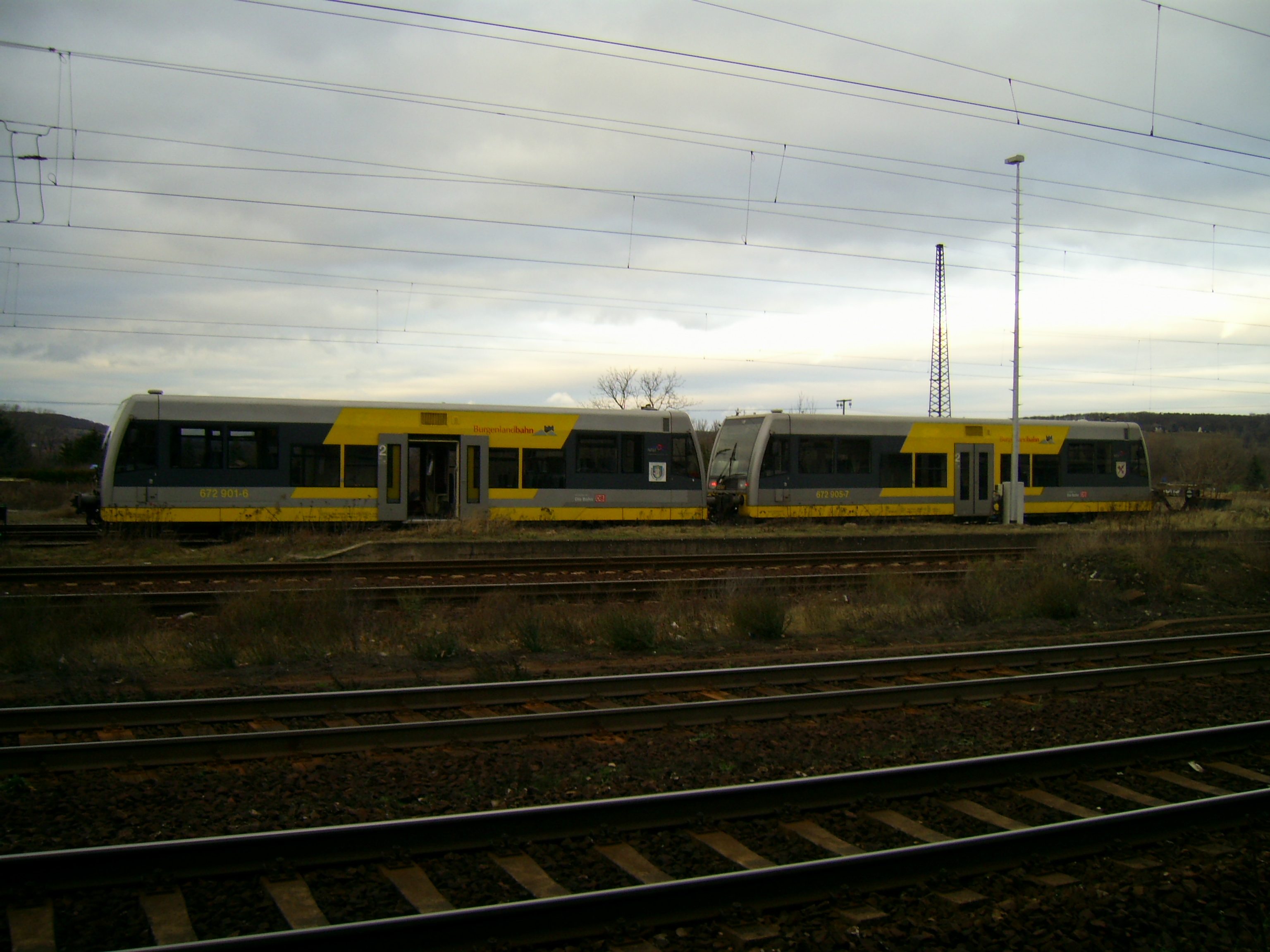
DWA LVT/S of Burgenlandbahn as DBAG Class 672.

In 1998, some vehicles were used by the Butzbach-Licher Eisenbahn on the Friedberg-Friedrichsdorf railway line because the ordered GTW 2/6 could not be delivered on time.

19 vehicles have been used by the Burgenlandbahn in Saxony-Anhalt since 1999 (as of 1 July 2008). The vehicles are stationed in Weißenfels.

Originally the vehicles were called KEG VT 3.01 to VT 3.18. Since the takeover of the vehicles by DB Regio in the year 2004 they are listed as 672 series. In the inventory there are the vehicles 672 901 to 904, 906 to 911 and 913 to 920. 672 912 is parked after a fire and 672 905 was retired on 27 November 2014. From April 2006 to December 2006, the vehicles were not used because of a damage of the frame for safety reasons until their renovation. Since March 2012, 672 919 and 920 have been stored as pre-production models. They have solid shafts for which there are no test instructions that meet the requirements of the Federal Railway Authority (EBA).

Due to a redesign of the VT 2E of the Frankfurt-Königsteiner Eisenbahn (as well as the Butzbach-Licher Eisenbahn, a subsidiary of the Hessische Landesbahn), three units of this type were used from 2006 to 2007 on the Königsteiner Bahn. These came from Bombardier and were on loan. In the meantime, they belong to the Hanseatische Eisenbahn.

In December 2011, the Städtebahn Sachsen rented a vehicle from Bombardier, which was mostly used between Pirna and Neustadt in Sachsen. In the meantime, the vehicle has been repainted and operates since December 2012 on the lines won by the Eisenbahngesellschaft Potsdam in the Prignitz.
