= Müritz National Park =

National park in Mecklenburg-Vorpommern, Germany

- Müritz-Nationalpark
- IUCN category II (national park)
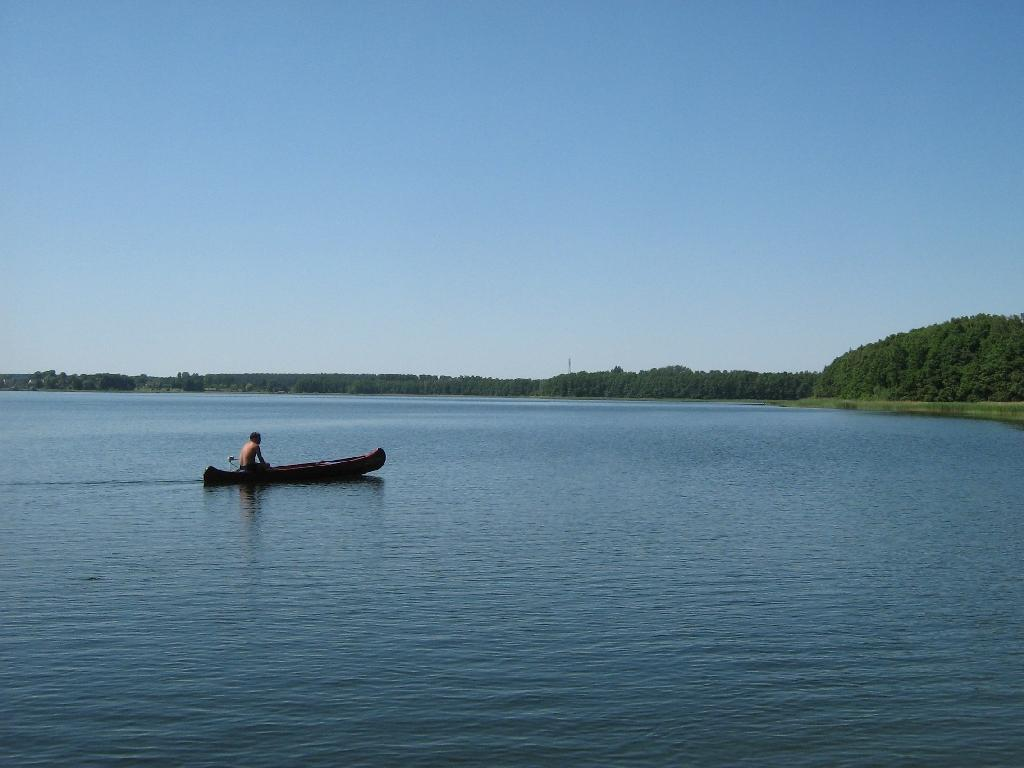
- Käbelicksee, Müritz National Park
- Interactive map of Müritz National Park
- Location: Mecklenburg-Vorpommern, Germany
- Nearest city: Neustrelitz, Waren
- Coordinates: 53°26′22″N 12°50′12″E
- Area: 318 km^{2} (123 sq mi)
- Established: October 1, 1990

Müritz National Park (German: Müritz-Nationalpark) is a national park situated roughly in the middle between Berlin and Rostock, in the south of the German state of Mecklenburg-Vorpommern. It extends over large portions of the Müritz lakeland in the district of Mecklenburgische Seenplatte. Müritz National Park was founded in 1990. The total area is 318 km^{2}. Near the city of Waren visitors can get information on the national park at the Müritzeum. The beech forests within the national park were inscribed on the UNESCO World Heritage List in 2011 as an extension of the Primeval Beech Forests of Europe site because of their unspoilt nature and testimony to the ecological history of Europe since the Last Glacial Period.

== Geography ==
The National Park is divided into two separated areas, Müritz and Serrahn. The first, larger portion extends from the eastern shore of Lake Müritz to the town of Neustrelitz. The latter, smaller part is situated east of Neustrelitz. The landscape features of the park are made up from terminal moraine, sandur and lowlands. 65% of the territory is covered with forest, 12% by lakes. The remaining area is made up of swamps or meadows.

Lake Müritz has an area of 118 km^{2}, but only its eastern shore is part of the National Park. The towns of Waren and Neustrelitz are the closest towns. There are about 100 lakes in Müritz National Park, including Bullowsee, and many more smaller waterbodies, runs, ditches and brooks. The Havel rises in the Müritz section, close to the water divide between the Baltic and the North Sea.

== Fauna and flora ==
Notable animals in the park include the red deer, the crane, the white-tailed eagle and the osprey. Other animals include great bittern, reed warbler, redshank, greenshank, black stork, crane, teal, garganey and little stint.

In addition to the unspoiled nature in general, a lot of open common juniper stands can be found in the national park. They were formerly used for cattle grazing.
