= Userin =

- Municipality
- Location of Userin within Mecklenburgische Seenplatte district
- Interactive map of Userin
- Location within Germany Location within Mecklenburg-Vorpommern
- Coordinates: 53°19′N 12°59′E
- Country: Germany
- State: Mecklenburg-Vorpommern
- District: Mecklenburgische Seenplatte
- Municipal assoc.: Neustrelitz-Land

Government
  - Mayor: Günter Urban

Area
  - Total: 45.84 km^{2} (17.70 sq mi)
- Elevation: 62 m (203 ft)

Population (2025-12-31)
  - Total: 673
  - Density: 14.7/km^{2} (38.0/sq mi)
- Time zone: UTC+01:00 (CET)
  - Summer (DST): UTC+02:00 (CEST)
- Postal codes: 17237
- Dialling codes: 03981, 039832
- Vehicle registration: MST
- Website: www.userin.de

Userin is a municipality in the district Mecklenburgische Seenplatte, in Mecklenburg-Vorpommern, Germany. It belongs to the Seenplatte district of Mecklenburg and is part of the administrative community of Neustrelitz-Land.

The lake Bullowsee is located within the municipality.
