= Neustrelitz Hauptbahnhof =

Railway station in Neustrelitz, Germany

Neustrelitz Hbf
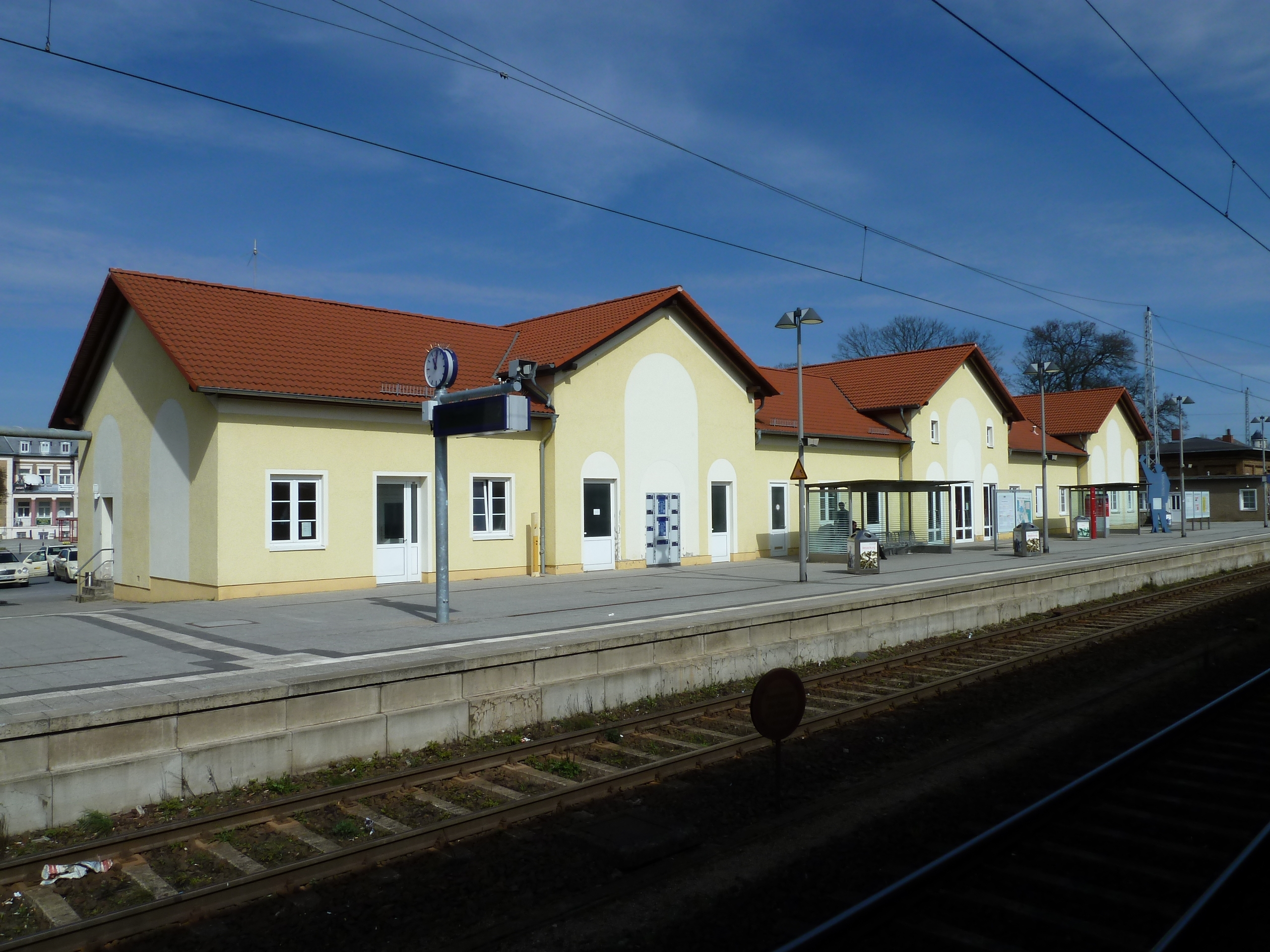
- Station building

General information
- Location: Rudi-Arndt-Platz 1, Neustrelitz, Mecklenburg-Vorpommern; Germany
- Coordinates: 53°21′34″N 13°4′33″E
- Owner: Deutsche Bahn
- Operator: DB Netz; DB Station&Service
- Lines: Stralsund-Neubrandenburg railway; Neustrelitz–Warnemünde railway; Wittenberge–Strasburg railway
- Platforms: 9

Construction
- Accessible: Yes

Other information
- Station code: 4460
- DS100 code: WNT
- IBNR: 8010250
- Category: 4
- Website: www.bahnhof.de

History
- Opened: 10 July 1877; 149 years ago
- Electrified: 2 June 1984; 42 years ago
Services
Preceding station	DB Fernverkehr	Following station
Waren (Müritz) towards Rostock Hbf	IC 17	Oranienburg towards Chemnitz Hbf
Waren (Müritz) towards Rostock Hbf	IC 56	Oranienburg towards Magdeburg Hbf
Preceding station	DB Regio Nordost	Following station
Kratzeburg towards Rostock Hbf	RE 5	Fürstenberg (Havel) towards Berlin Südkreuz
Blankensee (Meckl) towards Stralsund Hbf	RE 5	Fürstenberg (Havel) towards Berlin Südkreuz
Kratzeburg towards Rostock Hbf	RE 50	Terminus
Burg Stargard (Meckl) towards Stralsund Hbf	RE 51	Terminus
Preceding station	Hanseatische Eisenbahn	Following station
Terminus	RB 16	Groß Quassow towards Mirow
Location
- Location within Mecklenburg-Vorpommern Location within Germany Location within Europe

Neustrelitz Hauptbahnhof (German: Neustrelitz main station) is a railway station in the city of Neustrelitz, Mecklenburg-Vorpommern, Germany. The station lies on the Stralsund-Neubrandenburg railway, Neustrelitz–Warnemünde railway and Wittenberge–Strasburg railway. The train services are operated by Deutsche Bahn, DB Regio Nordost, and Hanseatische Eisenbahn.

Next to the main station, a separate station was built for the formerly private railway from the Prussian border at Buschhof to Strasburg, now called Neustrelitz Süd (south). Its entrance building and several outbuildings to the station have heritage protection.

== Location and name ==
The station is located east of central Neustrelitz at kilometer 98.5 of the Berlin Northern Railway. The line from Berlin reaches Neustrelitz from the south and, north of the station, it turns to the east. The Neustrelitz–Warnemünde railway (Lloydbahn, Lloyd Railway) begins at the station and runs to the northwest. Neustrelitz Süd station on the Wittenberge–Strasburg railway is located east of the station. This line comes from the west, passes under the Northern Railway south of the station and then first runs parallel with the Northern Railway. In passenger transport, the Neustrelitz Süd station has no longer been used since the tracks from the direction of Mirow were diverted so that trains of this line could start from Neustrelitz Hbf.

Originally the station was called only Neustrelitz. With the commissioning of a separate station for the private railway, it was called Neustrelitz Staatsbahnhof (state station) from 1908 and Neustrelitz Reichsbahnhof (Reichsbahn state station) from 1922. Since 15 June 1941, the station has been called Neustrelitz Hauptbahnhof.

== History ==
Plans for a railway line from Berlin to Stralsund via Neustrelitz, then the location of the court of the Mecklenburg-Strelitz, had been around since the 1850s. In 1853, the Prussian king Frederick William IV of Prussia approved a private railway line between these cities. However, the project failed because of the poor state of the economy and the lack of state support. In the 1860s, these plans were revived and the Berlin Northern Railway Company (Berliner Nord-Eisenbahn-Gesellschaft) was incorporated. Construction work began on the line in the spring of 1872 and on the Mecklenburg section in 1873. In 1875, the shares of the company were taken over by the Prussian government and the line from Berlin via Neustrelitz to Neubrandenburg was finally opened on 10 July 1877; the rest of the line to Stralsund was opened on 1 January 1878. The line in Mecklenburg was also administered by the Prussian state railways. Neustrelitz station building was built in a stately style since the city was the residence of the Grand Duke of Mecklenburg-Strelitz.

Neustrelitz station became a railway junction in In 1886, when the Lloyd Railway was opened from Neustrelitz to Warnemünde. Adequate areas had already been provided during the construction of the station for this purpose. Due to austerity measures, the extensions of the station for the new line were kept to a minimum. A bay platform was attached to the main platform and some transfer tracks and sidings were built. A combined residential and commercial building was built on Schwarzen Weg as the only building of the Lloyd Railway in Neustrelitz. After the nationalisation of the Mecklenburg railways and the introduction of through express trains on the Lloyd Railway from Berlin to Copenhagen there were some extensions of the railway tracks. The tracks of the Lloyd Railway were managed by the Grand Duchy of Mecklenburg Friedrich-Franz Railway (Mecklenburgische Friedrich-Franz-Eisenbahn, MFFE), while the Northern Railway was managed by the railway division of the Royal Prussian Railway (Königlich Preußischen Eisenbahndirektion) in Schwerin. Even after the establishment of Deutsche Reichsbahn, the border between two division (with headquarters in Schwerin and Stettin, later Greifswald) ran through the station.

On 18 May 1890, the Mecklenburg Friedrich-Franz Railway opened its line from Neustrelitz to Mirow. In 1895, the line was extended to the Prussian border at Buschhof (in Schwarz) where it connected with the Prussian line from Perleberg via Wittstock. The Wittenberge–Strasburg railway of the MFFE was also opened in 1890 from Blankensee on the Northern Railway towards Strasburg. In 1907, the MFFE established its own line between Neustrelitz and Blankensee parallel to the Northern Railway. While the MFEE had previously used state railway stations in both places, it now built separate stations. In Neustrelitz, the MFEE built its own station next to the state station in Neustrelitz, which was later called Neustrelitz Süd. In 1910, the MFEE opened the Thurow–Feldberg railway, which branched off its line to Strasburg in Thurow (in the municipality of Carpin). The line was served by trains always running to and from Neustrelitz.

The station building was destroyed during the Second World War and only the ground floor remained and it was fitted with a temporary roof. After the war, the line from Thurow to Strasburg, formerly owned by the MFWE, was dismantled, but the line to Feldberg remained. The track of the Lloyd Railway towards Rostock was dismantled from Neustrelitz to Plaaz as reparations. However, in the late 1950s, it became clear that the reconstruction of the line was urgently needed. The new port of Rostock in particular required good links for freight trains. The reconstruction of the line began in 1958 and it was completely realigned for long sections. The line was also relocated in the Neustrelitz area. While the original line branched off to the northwest at the northern end of the station, the new route initially follows the Northern Railway and only later turns to the northwest. The line between Lalendorf Neustrelitz was opened as a branch line on 31 March 1961 and it was reclassified as a single-track main line on 30 May 1964.

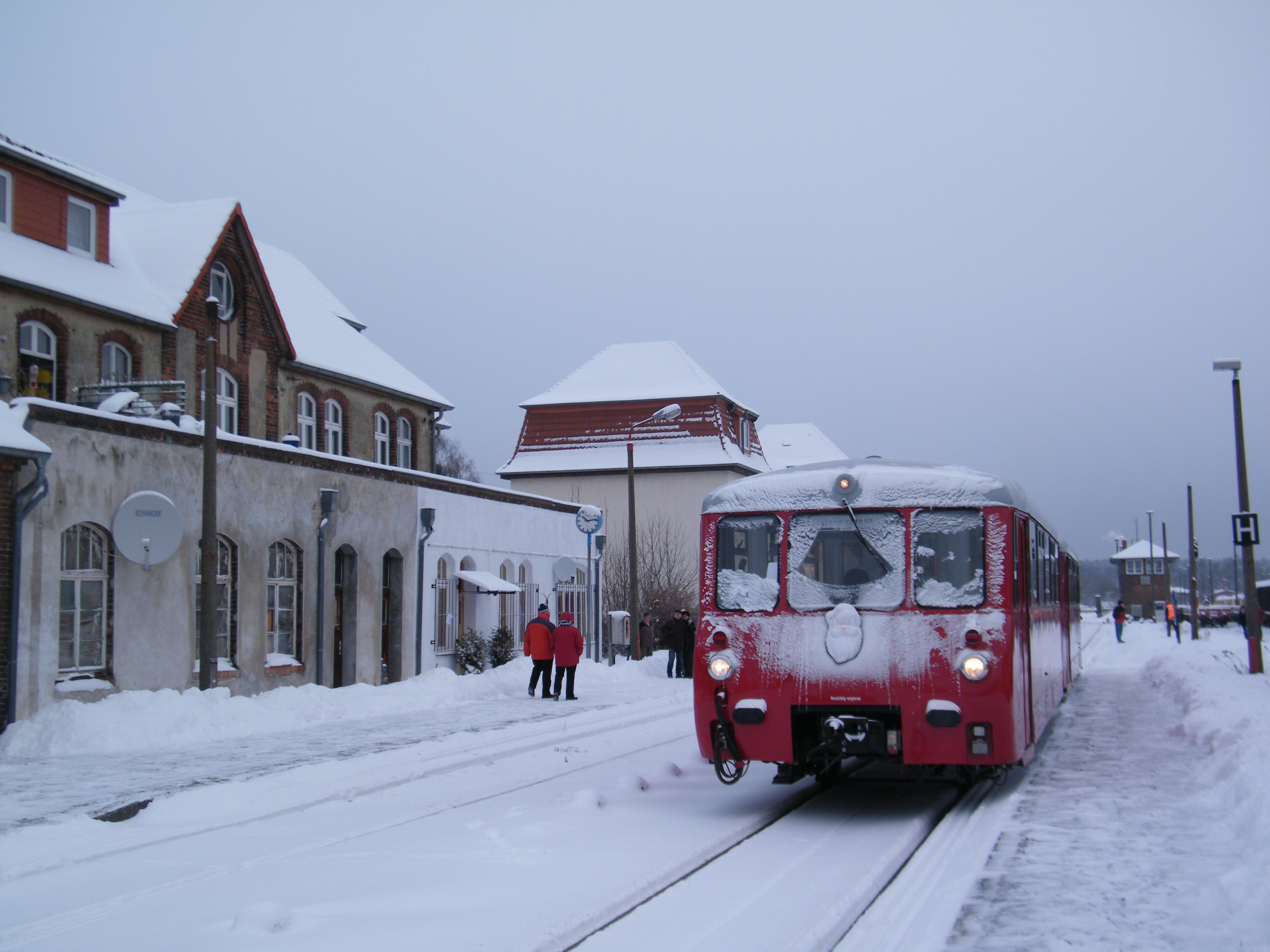
On 18 December 2010, special excursion passenger trains ran again from Neustrelitz Süd station to Feldberg

With the change of traffic to diesel-haulage from 1969 to 1973, new large workshop was built at the Neustrelitz locomotive depot (Bahnbetriebswerk). This at first mainly serviced large diesel locomotives of classes 130 and 132. About 2000 railway workers worked at the site Neustrelitz.

The tracks through Neustrelitz station were electrified on 2 June 1984. In previous years, the second track towards Waren (Müritz) had been relaid and the station had been rebuilt. Since then the new island platform has been reached via a pedestrian underpass. The line to Neubrandenburg was electrified in 1993. The station building was renovated in 1992.

Traffic was abandoned on the line to Feldberg in 2000. The junction of the line from Mirow was rebuilt in 2003 allowing the track to run directly to the station; since then Neustrelitz Süd station has not handled passenger traffic. The signal systems has been operated since that time by the electronic signal centre at Fürstenberg/Havel, which is controlled from the operations centre in Berlin. In December 2012, the railway operations on the line to Mirow were to have been discontinued due to low ridership. As part of a model project, however, in collaboration with the state and the infrastructure manager, RegioInfra GmbH, four pairs of trains a day between the two cities have continued to be operated by Eisenbahngesellschaft Potsdam.

=== Passenger services ===
The following services stop in Neustrelitz:

Line	Route		Frequency	Operator
IC 17	Warnemünde – Rostock – Neustrelitz – Berlin – Elsterwerda – Dresden		120 min	DB Fernverkehr
IC 56	Magdeburg – Berlin Hbf – Neustrelitz – Rostock		One train pair	DB Fernverkehr
RE 5	Rostock – Güstrow –	Neustrelitz – Berlin Südkreuz	60 min	DB Regio Nordost
RE 5	Stralsund – Neubrandenburg –	Neustrelitz – Berlin Südkreuz	60 min	DB Regio Nordost
RE 50	Rostock – Güstrow – Neustrelitz		120 min	DB Regio Nordost
RE 51	Neustrelitz – Blankenberg – Neubrandenburg – Demmin – Grimmen – Stralsund		120 min	DB Regio Nordost
RB 16	Neustrelitz – Wesenberg – Mirow		120 min	Hanseatische Eisenbahn

== Infrastructure ==
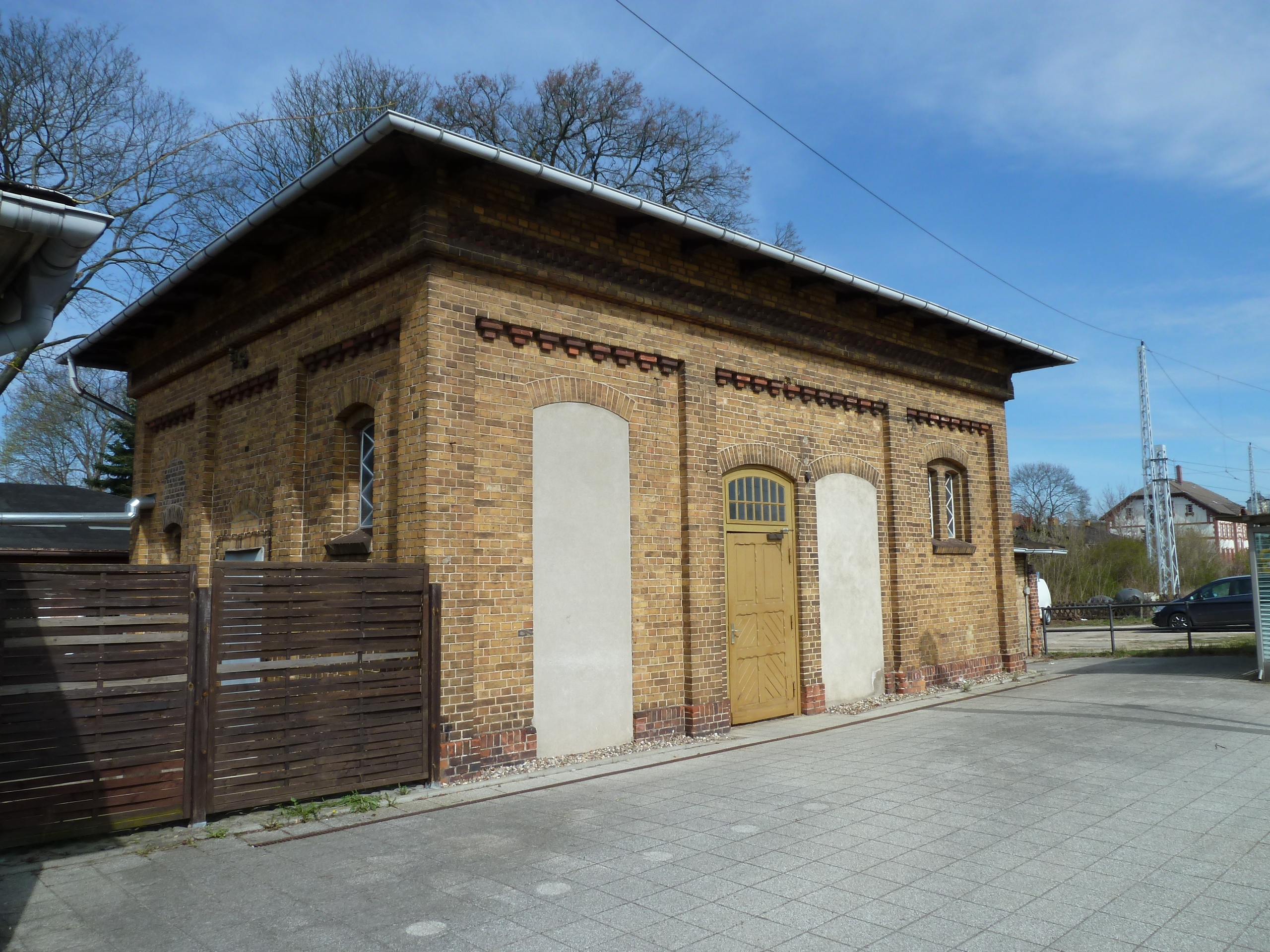
Listed former public lavatory at the Hauptbahnhof

The station has a main platform next to the station building and an island platform with two platform edges. At the northern end of the main platform there is a bay platform. The closed facilities for freight are to the north of the platforms, where also a track connection between the main lines and the Neustrelitz Süd station.

Track 2 is next to the main building (although this would normally be track 1 in Germany), while track 1 is between tracks 2 and 3 on the island platform.

The station building is located on the western side of the track, facing the centre of the city. It was heavily damaged in World War II and was only temporarily and partially restored.

The Neustrelitz Süd station is located east of the main station and is accessible via the pedestrian tunnel from the main station. It has a main platform and an island platform, which are accessible at ground level across the tracks. Its entrance building is a listed building. The railway official's house of the Lloyd Railway on Schwarzen Weg and the public lavatory of the main station are also listed buildings.

The facilities of the locomotive depot are located a kilometre north of the station on the western side of the railway tracks. After the Deutsche Bahn decided not to operate the workshop, it was taken over by Prignitzer Eisenbahn GmbH, which is a subsidiary of the Italian company Netinera. It now operates under the name of Netinera Werke GmbH.
