= Mirow station =

Railway station in Mirow, Germany

Mirow
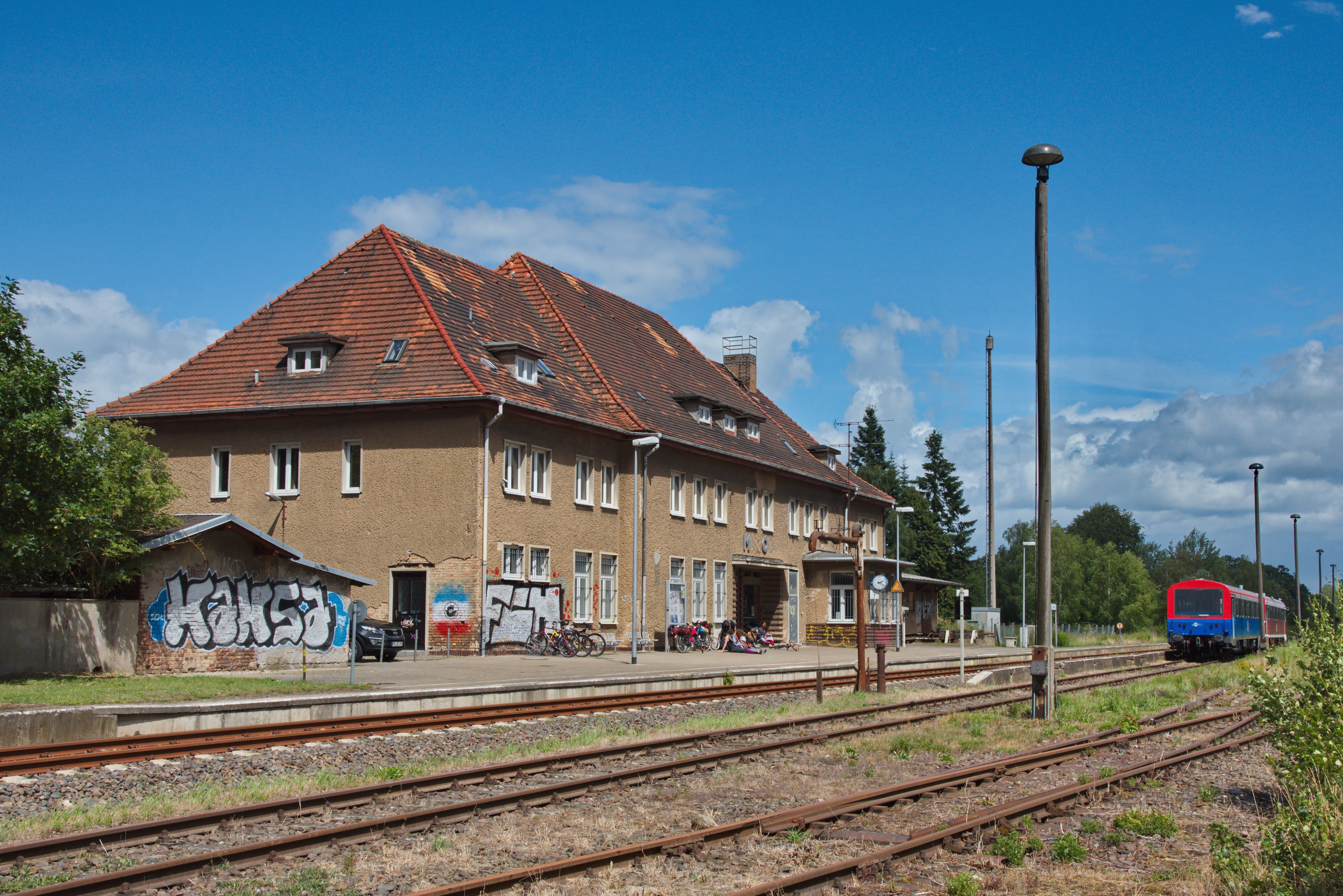
- Mirow railway station

General information
- Location: Mirow, MV, Germany
- Coordinates: 53°16′13″N 12°49′15″E
- Line: Wittenberge–Strasburg railway
- Platforms: 1
- Tracks: 2

History
- Opened: 15 July 1890; 136 years ago

Services
Preceding station	Hanseatische Eisenbahn	Following station
Terminus	RB 16	Zirtow-Leussow towards Neustrelitz Hbf
Location
- Location within Mecklenburg-Vorpommern Location within Germany Location within Europe

Mirow (German: Bahnhof Mirow) is a railway station in the town of Mirow, Mecklenburg-Vorpommern, Germany. The station lies on the Wittenberge–Strasburg railway and the train services are operated by Hanseatische Eisenbahn.

== Train services ==
The station is served by the following services:

- regional service (Hanseatische Eisenbahn) Neustrelitz - Mirow
