= Burgenlandbahn (Saxony-Anhalt) =

- Industry: Transport
- Founded: 1999
- Founder: DB Regio
- Headquarters: Leipzig, (Germany)
- Parent: DB Regio
- Website: burgenlandbahn.de

The Burgenlandbahn is a brand that DB Regio uses for their local passenger rail transport in southern Saxony-Anhalt, Germany. Since 1999, it has served several branch lines, some of them have been canceled in the meantime. With the Burgenlandbahn great hopes were combined to secure the area network by low operating costs despite low population density permanently.

The train company currently serves 32 stations in a traffic area of 2,200 square kilometers and 500,000 inhabitants and a network of around 100 kilometers. Annually, around 1.15 million train kilometers are provided.

== Rolling stock ==
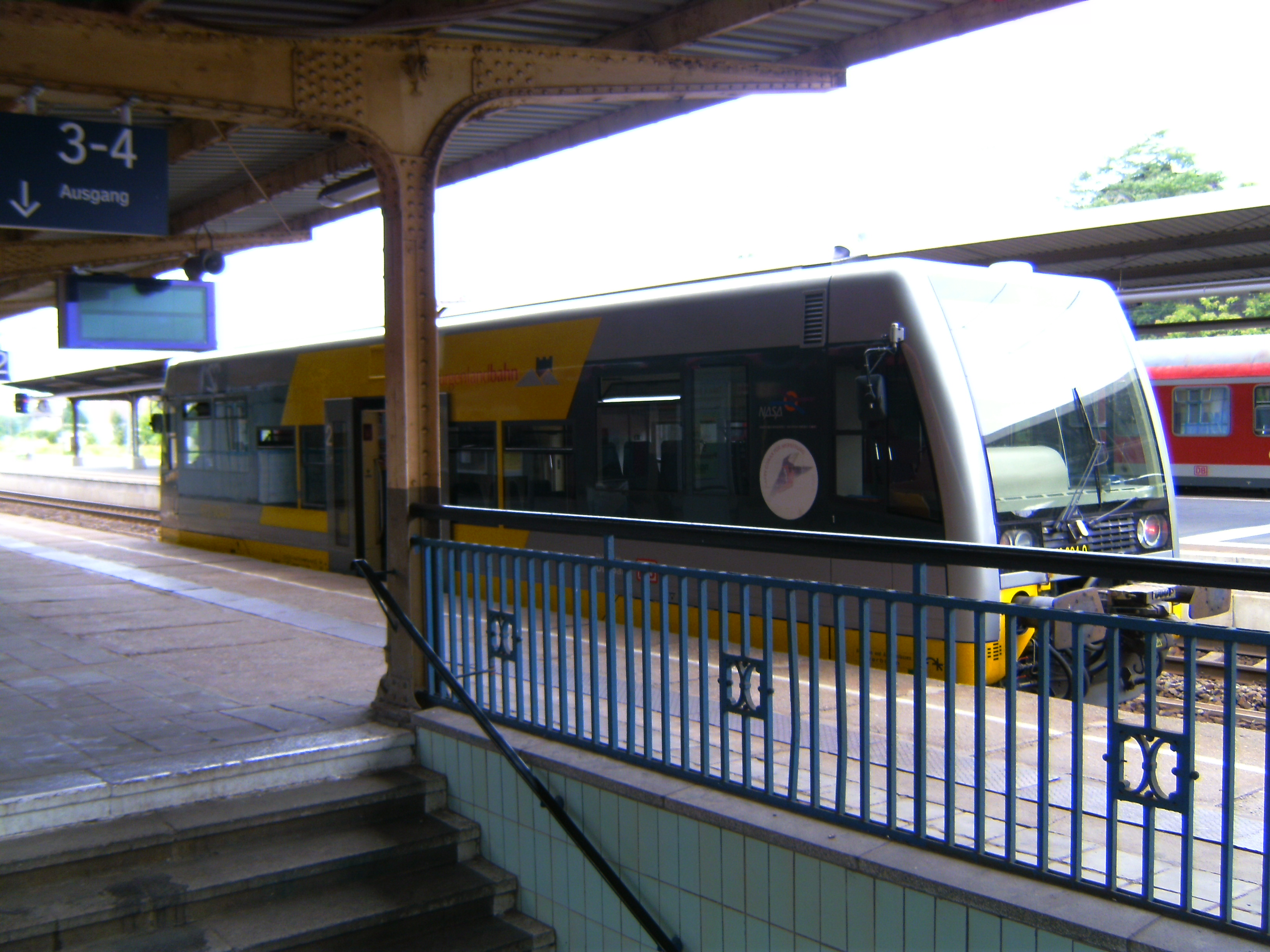
VT 672 in Weißenfels

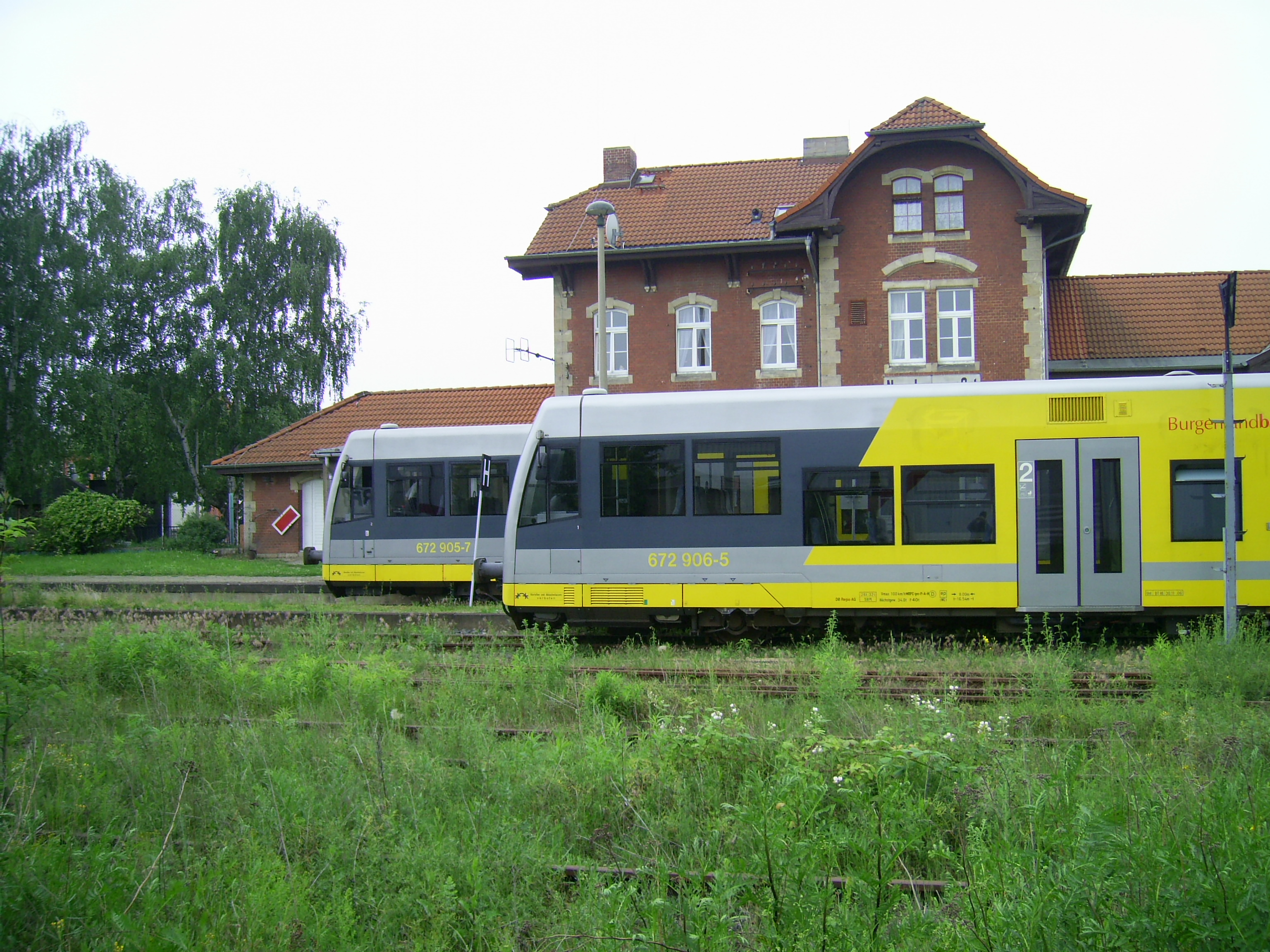
VT 672 in Naumburg (Saale) Ost on 4 June 2007

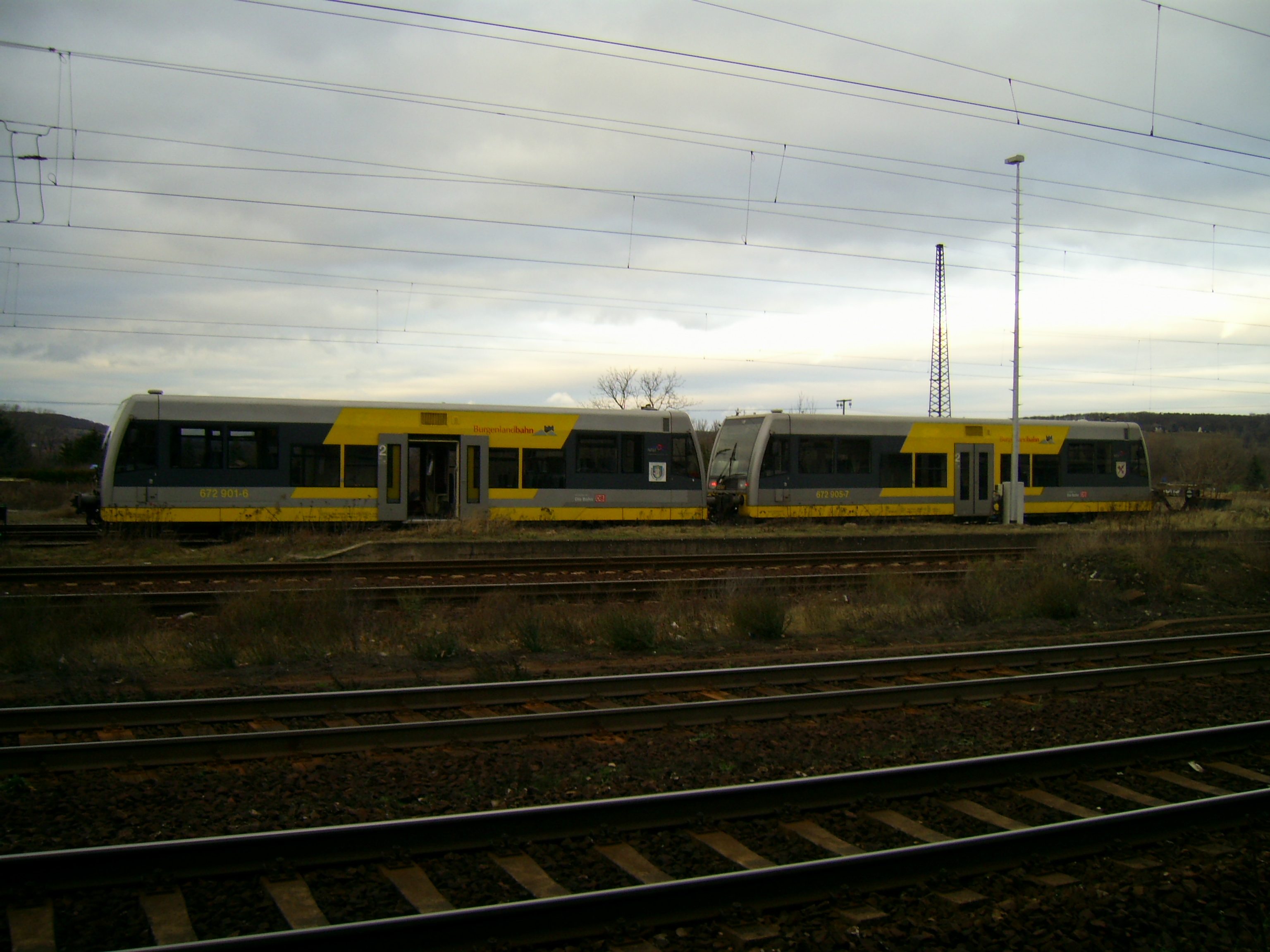
672 901-6 ("Naumburg") and 672 905-7 ("Weißenfels") parked at Naumburg (Saale) Hauptbahnhof on 13 January 2007

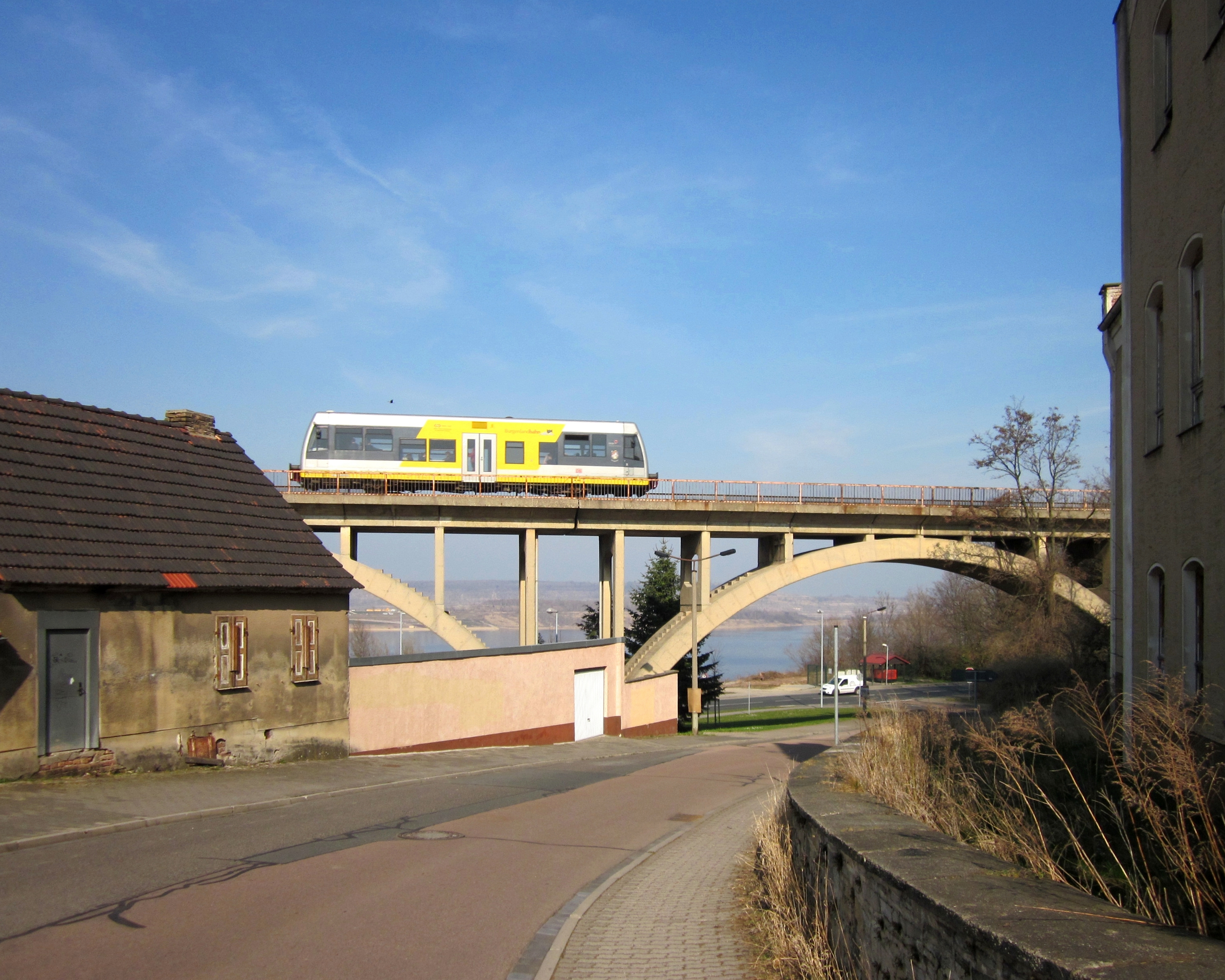
Burgenlandbahn at Mücheln (Geiseltal)

- 19x DWA LVT/S (VT 672)

== Network ==
=== Current services ===
Line	KBS	Route	Railway line	Duration of contract
RB 76	551	Weißenfels – Teuchern – Theißen – Zeitz	Weißenfels–Zeitz railway	
RB 77	585	Naumburg (Saale) Ost – Naumburg (Saale) Hauptbahnhof – Freyburg (Unstrut) – Laucha (Unstrut) – Nebra – Wangen (Unstrut)	Unstrutbahn	
RB 78	586	Merseburg – Braunsbedra – Mücheln (Geiseltal) – Querfurt	Geiseltalbahn	

=== Former services ===
Line	KBS	Route	Railway line	Duration of contract	Notes
RB 73	337	Klostermansfeld – Mansfeld (Südharz) – Vatterode – Wippra	Wipperliese	until 12 April 2015	replaced by bus service
RB 77	592	Berga-Kelbra – Rottleberode – Stolberg (Harz)		until 13 December 2014	replaced by bus service
RB 79	588	Merseburg – Bad Lauchstädt – Schafstädt		until 10 December 2011	replaced by bus service
RB 94	551	Naumburg (Saale) Ost – Teuchern – Zeitz		until 11 December 2010	replaced by bus service
RB 95	551	Wangen (Unstrut) – Roßleben – Artern		until 9 December 2006	replaced by bus service
RB	587	Querfurt – Esperstedt – Schraplau – Röblingen		until 13 Dezember 2003	replaced by bus service
