= Fuchs (surname) =

Fuchs (Czech feminine: Fuchsová) is a surname, meaning 'fox' in German and Yiddish. Variants of the surname include Fux and Fuks. In the mediaeval times it could be Latinized to Fuchsius or Fuxius. Notable people with the surname include:

== Fuchs ==
=== A–D ===
- Alain Fuchs (1953–2024), French theoretical chemist
- Anke Fuchs (1937–2019), German politician
- Argel Fuchs (born Argélico Fucks 1974), Brazilian footballer
- Arved Fuchs (born 1953), German writer and adventurer
- Benjamin Fuchs (born 1983), German-Austrian footballer
- Bernie Fuchs (1932–2009), American illustrator
- Bohuslav Fuchs (1895–1972), Czech architect
- Bruce Fuchs, American immunologist and health science administrator
- Charlie Fuchs (1912–1969), American baseball player
- Christian Fuchs (born 1986), Austrian footballer
- Christine Schwarz-Fuchs (born 1974), Austrian entrepreneur and politician
- Christopher A. Fuchs (born 1964), American physicist
- Daniel Fuchs (1909–1993), American writer and screenwriter
- Dmitry Fuchs (born 1939), Russian-American mathematician
- Doris Fuchs (scientist) (born 1966), German political scientist
- Doris Fuchs (born 1938), American gymnast

=== E–F ===
- Eduard Fuchs (1870–1940), Marxist cultural scientist
- Elaine Fuchs (born 1950), American cell biologist
- Elissa Minet Fuchs (1919–2023), American ballerina
- Elizabeth Fuchs, American politician
- Emil Fuchs (disambiguation), several people
- Engelbert Fuchs, Austrian luger
- Erich Fuchs (1902–1980), German Nazi SS officer and Holocaust perpetrator
- Erika Fuchs (1906–2005), German translator of Disney comics
- Ernst Fuchs (artist) (1930–2015), Austrian artist
- Ernst Fuchs (cyclist) (1936–1994), Swiss cyclist
- Ernst Fuchs (doctor) (1851–1930), Austrian ophthalmologist
- Ernst Fuchs (theologian) (1903–1983) German New Testament scholar and student of Rudolf Bultmann
- Ernest Fooks (1906–1985) Australian architect
- Ester Fuchs (born 1951), American academic
- Franz Fuchs (1949–2000), Austrian terrorist
- Fred Fuchs, American television producer

=== G–I ===
- Gottfried Fuchs (1889–1972), German-Canadian soccer player
- Gustav Fuchs (1900–1969), German politician
- Harald Fuchs (born 1951), German professor of physics
- Helena Fuchsová (1965–2021), Czech track runner
- Henry Fuchs (disambiguation), multiple people
- Herbert Fuchs (1905–1988), American lawyer
- Ignaz Fuchs, (1819–1854), born Vatroslav Lisinski, Croatian composer
- Ira Fuchs (born 1948), American computer scientist

=== J–K ===
- Jakob Fuchs (1920–2005), German soldier
- Jason Fuchs (born 1986), American actor
- Jenő Fuchs (1882–1955), Hungarian fencer
- Jim Fuchs (1927–2010), American athlete
- Joël Fuchs (born 1989), Swiss basketball player
- Johann Fuchs (disambiguation), multiple people
- Joseph Fuchs (1899–1997), American violinist
- Josef Fuchs (disambiguation), various people
- Jürgen Fuchs (disambiguation), multiple people
- Karl Fuchs (disambiguation), multiple people
- Kenneth Fuchs (born 1956), American composer
- Klaus Fuchs (1911–1988), German-born British nuclear physicist and Soviet spy
- Kurt Fuchs (1919–1945), Austrian soldier

=== L–M ===
- Lars Fuchs (born 1982), German footballer
- László Fuchs (born 1924), Hungarian-American mathematician
- Lawrence Fuchs (1927–2013), American academic and author
- Lazarus Fuchs (1833–1902), German mathematician
- Leonhart Fuchs (1501–1566), German physician and botanist
- Lillian Fuchs (1901–1995), American violist
- Lukas Fuchs (1922–2009), better known as Lukas Foss, German-American composer and conductor
- Marta Fuchs (1898–1974), German opera singer
- Michael Fuchs (disambiguation), several people

=== N–Z ===
- Nicolás Fuchs (born 1982), Peruvian rally driver
- Peter Fuchs (disambiguation), multiple people
- Radovan Fuchs (born 1953), Croatian scientist and politician
- Richard Fuchs (1887–1947), architect and composer
- Robert Fuchs (disambiguation), several people
- Ronald Fuchs (1932–2012), American physicist
- Rudi Fuchs (1942): Dutch art historian, museum director and curator
- Rutger Fuchs (1682–1753), Swedish army officer
- Ruth Fuchs (1946–2023), German athlete
- Stephen Fuchs (1908–2000), Austrian anthropologist
- Thomas Fuchs (born 1969), German illustrator
- Vivian Fuchs (1908–1999), British geologist and polar explorer
- Walter Robert Fuchs (1937–1976), American-German science communicator and science popularizer
- Wenzel Fuchs (born 1963), Austrian clarinetist
- Wilhelm Fuchs (1898–1947), German Nazi SS officer and Holocaust perpetrator executed for war crimes
- Wolfgang Fuchs (disambiguation), various people

== Fuks ==
- Alexander Fuks (1917–1978), German-Israeli historian, archaeologist and papyrologist
- Johannes Fuks (1890–1977), Estonian politician
- Julián Fuks (born 1981), Brazilian writer
- Ladislav Fuks (1923–1994), Czech novelist
- Marian Fuks (disambiguation), multiple people
- Pavel Fuks (born 1971), Ukrainian-Russian millionaire businessman and investor
- Suzon Fuks (born 1959), Belgian-Australian artist, choreographer and director

== Fux ==
- Herbert Fux (1927–2007), Austrian actor
- Jacques Fux, Brazilian writer
- Johann Joseph Fux (1660–1741), Austrian composer, music theorist and pedagogue
- Luiz Fux (born 1953), Brazilian judge
- María Fux (1922–2023), Argentine dancer, choreographer and dance therapist
- Robert Fux (born 1979), Swedish actor, performance artist, playwright and drag queen
- Vinzenz Fux (c. 1606–1659), Austrian composer

== See also ==
- Ernest Fooks (1906–1985), Australian architect from Europe
- Ralf Fücks (born 1951), German politician
