= Tangermünde (Verwaltungsgemeinschaft) =

Former collective municipality in Germany

Coordinates: 52°32′27″N 11°58′08″E

Tangermünde was a Verwaltungsgemeinschaft ("collective municipality") in the district of Stendal, in Saxony-Anhalt, Germany. The seat of the Verwaltungsgemeinschaft was in Tangermünde. It was disbanded on 1 January 2010, when the member municipalities merged to form the new town of Tangermünde.

The Verwaltungsgemeinschaft Tangermünde consisted of the following municipalities:

1. Bölsdorf
2. Buch
3. Grobleben
4. Hämerten
5. Langensalzwedel
6. Miltern
7. Storkau
8. Tangermünde
