= Bruce =

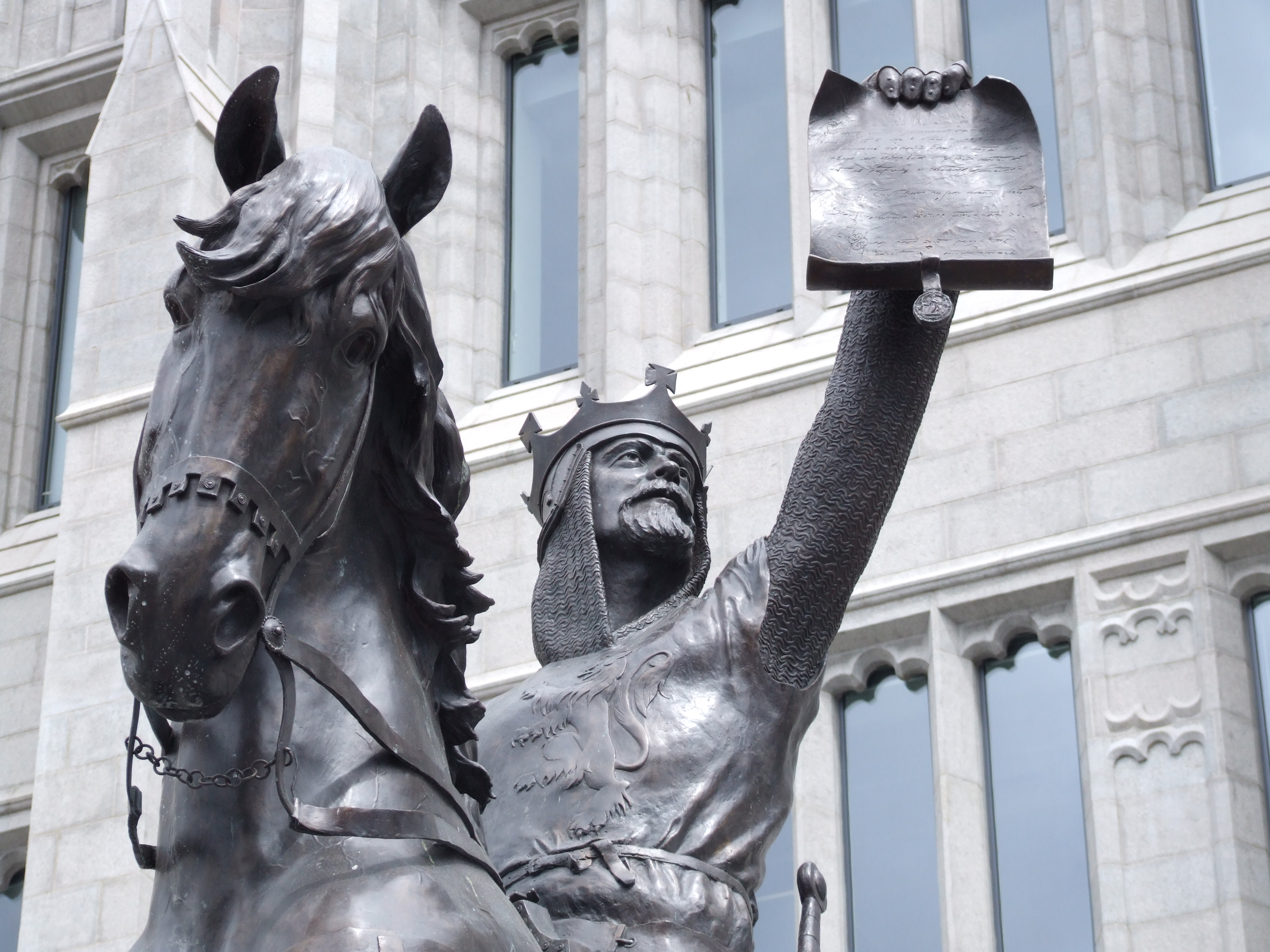
- Robert the Bruce
- Gender: Male

Origin
- Meaning: the willowlands

Other names
- Popularity: see popular names

Bruce is an English language name that arrived in Scotland with the Normans, from the place name Brix, Manche in Normandy, France, meaning "the willowlands". Initially promulgated via the descendants of king Robert the Bruce (1274−1329), it has been a Scottish surname since medieval times; it is now a common male given name.

The variant Lebrix and Le Brix are French variations of the surname.

Note: A few people are notable in more than one field, and therefore appear in more than one section.

== Arts and entertainment ==
=== Film and television ===
- Bruce Altman (born 1955), American actor
- Bruce Baillie (1931–2020), American filmmaker
- Bruce Bennett (1906–2007), American actor and athlete
- Bruce Berman (born 1952), American film producer
- Bruce Boa (1930–2004), Canadian actor
- Bruce Boxleitner (born 1950), American actor
- Bruce Campbell (born 1958), American actor, director, writer, producer and author
- Bruce Conner (1933–2008), American artist and filmmaker
- Bruce Davison (born 1946), American actor and director
- Bruce Dern (born 1936), American actor
- Bruce Forsyth (1928–2017), English television host and entertainer
- Bruce Glover (1932–2025), American actor
- Bruce Gowers (1940–2023), English television director and producer
- Bruce Gray (1936–2017), American-Canadian actor
- Bruce Greenwood (born 1956), Canadian actor
- Bruce Helford (born 1952), American TV writer and producer
- Bruce Herbelin-Earle (born 1998), English-French actor and model
- Bruce Horak (born 1974), Canadian artist and television and stage actor
- Bruce Hung (born 1990), Taiwanese actor
- Bruce Jones (born 1953), English actor
- Bruce Kirby (1925–2021), American actor
- Bruce LaBruce (born 1964), Canadian artist, writer, filmmaker, photographer
- Bruce Lee (1940–1973), martial artist and movie star
- Bruce Lester (1912–2008), English actor
- Bruce McCulloch (born 1961), Canadian actor and comedian
- Bruce McDonald (born 1959), Canadian film and TV director
- Bruce McGill (born 1950), American actor
- Bruce Payne (born 1958), English actor
- Bruce Spence (born 1945), New Zealand-Australian actor
- Bruce Willis (born 1955), American retired actor

=== Music ===
- Bruce Abel (1936–2021), American singer
- Bruce C. Allen (died 2009), American guitarist in The Suburbs
- Bruce Barth (born 1958), American jazz pianist and composer
- Bruce Cockburn (born 1945), Canadian guitarist, singer-songwriter, and author
- Bruce Corbitt (1962–2019), American heavy metal vocalist
- Bruce Dickinson (born 1958), English singer, songwriter, writer, and brewer
- Bruce Guthro (born 1961), Canadian singer-songwriter
- Bruce Hart (songwriter) (1938–2006), American songwriter and screenwriter
- Bruce Hornsby (born 1954), American singer-songwriter and pianist
- Bruce Johnston (born 1942), American musician, singer, songwriter, arranger, and record producer
- Bruce Kulick (born 1953), American musician
- Bruce Levingston, American concert pianist
- Bruce Molsky, (born 1955), American multi-instrumentalist and singer
- Bruce Montgomery, pen name Edmund Crispin, English crime writer and composer
- Bruce Montgomery (musical director) (1927–2008), composer, artist, conductor, and director from Philadelphia
- Bruce Palmer (died 2004), Canadian bassist in Buffalo Springfield
- Bruce Springsteen (born 1949), American singer-songwriter, and musician
- Bruce Thorburn, former member of the Hooley Dooleys Australian children's music and performance act
- Bruce Welch (born 1941), English guitarist, songwriter, and producer

=== Other arts and entertainment ===
- Bruce Allen (manager), Canadian manager of musical artists
- Bruce Angrave (1914–1983), English poster artist, illustrator and author
- Bruce Bawer (born 1956), American author and cultural critic
- Bruce Hart (wrestler) (born 1950), Canadian professional wrestler
- Bruce Gray (sculptor) (1956–2019), American sculptor
- Bruce McCall (1935–2023), Canadian author and illustrator
- Bruce Montgomery, pen name Edmund Crispin, English crime writer and composer
- Bruce Moon (born c. 1951), American art therapist
- Bruce Morrow (born 1935 or 1937), American radio personality born Bruce Meyerowitz
- Bruce Nauman (born 1941), American multi-media artist
- Bruce Petty (1929–2023), Australian political satirist, sculptor and cartoonist
- Bruce Sterling, American science fiction writer
- Bruce Wands (1949–2022), American digital artist and educator
- Bruce Weber (photographer) (born 1946), American fashion photographer and filmmaker
- Bruce West (artist) (1939–2021), American sculptor

== Business ==
- Bruce Rauner (born 1957), American businessman and politician
- Bruce Ritchie (born 1965), English property developer
- Bruce Rockowitz (born 1958/59), American businessman

== Crime and the law ==
- Bruce Lander (born 1946), Federal Court of Australia judge
- Bruce George Peter Lee (born 1960), English serial killer and arsonist
- Bruce Lindahl (1953–1981), American serial killer
- Bruce Mendenhall (born 1951), American suspected serial killer
- Bruce McArthur (born 1951), Canadian serial killer
- Bruce Jeffrey Pardo, American mass murderer and perpetrator of the 2009 Covina massacre

== Military ==
- Bruce W. Carr (1924–1998), American World War II flying ace
- Bruce W. Carter (1950–1969), American Marine killed in the Vietnam War, awarded the Medal of Honor

== Politics ==
- Bruce F. Allen (1917–1986), American politician
- Bruce Baird (1942–2026), Australian politician
- Bruce Blakeman (1955–present), American politician
- Bruce Fanjoy, Canadian politician
- Bruce Haigh (1945–2023), Australian political commentator and diplomat
- Bruce Harrell (born 1958), American politician
- Bruce Kent (1929–2022), English political activist and priest
- Bruce Laingen (1922–2019), American diplomat
- Bruce Marks (politician) (born 1957), American politician
- Bruce Nestande (1938–2020), American politician
- Bruce Rauner (born 1957), American businessman and politician
- Bruce Reed (born 1960), American political advisor and non-profit administrator
- Bruce Reid (politician) (1935–2020), Australian politician
- Bruce Russett (1935–2023), American political scientist
- Bruce Vento (1940–2000), American politician
- Bruce Westerman (born 1967), American politician
- Bruce A. White, American politician

== Science, technology and medicine ==
- Bruce Allen (physicist) (born 1959), American physicist
- Bruce G. Blair (1947–2020), American nuclear security expert, research scholar, author, and TV producer
- Bruce Bowman (1945–2020), American astrodynamicist
- Bruce Chorpita (born 1967), American clinical psychologist
- Bruce Fuchs, American immunologist and health science administrator
- Bruce Irons (engineer) (1924–1983), Canadian engineer and mathematician
- Bruce Lerman, American cardiologist
- Bruce Perens, computer programmer, open source founder
- Bruce Schneier (born 1963), cryptographer, computer security professional, privacy specialist and writer
- Bruce Webster, American software engineer, educator, and author
- Bruce Western (born 1964), American sociologist
- Bruce Wilcox (born 1951), American programmer

== Sports ==
- Bruce Allen (American football) (born 1956), American football executive
- Bruce Allen (drag racer), American drag racer
- Bruce Arena (born 1951), American national soccer coach
- Bruce Arians (born 1952), American football head coach
- Bruce Bennett (1943–2021), American football player
- Bruce Bochte (born 1950), American baseball player
- Bruce Bochy (born 1955), American retired baseball team manager and player
- Bruce Bolden (born 1963), American basketball player
- Bruce Bowen (born 1971) American basketball player
- Bruce Boudreau (born 1955), Canadian hockey player and coach
- Bruce Branch (American football) (born 1978), American football player
- Bruce Carter (American football) (born 1988), American football player
- Bruce Chen (born 1977), Panamanian professional baseball pitcher
- Bruce Claridge (died 1999), Canadian football player
- Bruce Curry (born 1956), American former professional boxer
- Bruce Dalrymple (born 1964), American basketball player
- Bruce Dickison (born 1953), New Zealand rugby league footballer and coach
- Bruce Dombolo (born 1985), French footballer
- Bruce Fleisher (1948–2021), American professional golfer
- Bruce Flockhart (born 1997), Scottish rugby union player
- Bruce Gamble (1938–1982), Canadian professional ice hockey goalie
- Bruce Grobbelaar (born 1957), Zimbabwean football goalkeeper and manager
- Bruce Hector (born 1994), American football player
- Bruce Holmes (born 1965), American football player
- Bruce Irons (surfer) (born 1979), American surfer
- Bruce Irvin (born 1987), American football player
- Bruce Jankowski (born 1949), American football player
- Bruce Kamau (born 1995), Australian footballer
- Bruce Kent (cyclist) (1928–1979), New Zealander cyclist
- Bruce LaSane (born 1967), American football player
- Bruce Lundgren (1931–2003), Australian rules footballer
- Bruce Manson (born 1956), American tennis player
- Bruce McCray (born 1963), American football player
- Bruce McLaren (1937–1970), New Zealander race car driver and designer, founder of McLaren
- Bruce McMillan (sport shooter) (born 1942), New Zealand sportsman
- Bruce McPhail (1937–2020), New Zealander rugby union player
- Bruce Pandolfini (born 1947), American chess author, teacher, and coach
- Bruce Prichard (born 1963), American professional wrestling executive
- Bruce Reid (born 1963), former Australian Test cricketer
- Bruce Reid Sr. (1929–1955), Australian rules footballer
- Bruce Reid Jr. (born 1955), Australian rules footballer
- Bruce K. Reid (1950–1970), Australian rules footballer
- Bruce Reid (doctor) (1946–2020), Australian rules footballer and Essendon club doctor
- Bruce Seldon (born 1967), American boxing heavyweight and world champion
- Bruce Smith (halfback) (1920–1967), American football player
- Bruce Smith (Australian footballer) (1939–2017), Australian rules footballer
- Bruce Smith (cricketer) (born 1946), New Zealand cricketer
- Bruce Smith (Canadian football) (1949–2013), Canadian football player
- Bruce Smith (luger) (born 1958), Canadian luger
- Bruce Smith (rugby union) (born 1959), New Zealand rugby union player
- Bruce Smith (born 1963), American football player
- Bruce Sutter (1953–2022), American baseball pitcher
- Bruce Tasker (born 1987), English bobsledder
- Bruce Weber (administrator) (1951–2006), Australian sports administrator
- Bruce Weber (basketball) (born 1956), American basketball coach
- Bruce Wallrodt (1951–2019), Australian Paralympic athlete

== Other ==
- Bruce (kea), a male kea studied for his accommodation of a beak disability
- Bruce R. McConkie (1915–1985), American LDS Church leader and author
- Bruce Parry (born 1969), English explorer, author, indigenous rights advocate and documentarian

== Fictional characters ==
- The Bruces, from the Monty Python Bruces sketch
- Bruce Banner, the alter ego of the Hulk
- Bruce Wayne, the alter ego of Batman
- Bruce Nolan, Bruce Almighty
