= Fuchs Group =

Fuchs Group may refer to:

- Fuchs Gruppe, spice company based in Germany
- Fuchs SE, lubricant manufacturer based in Germany, known as Fuchs Group in English-language branding

== See also ==
- Fuchs
