= Fuxian =

Fuxian may refer to the following locations in China:

- Fuxian Lake (抚仙湖), in Yunnan, the second deepest freshwater lake in China
- Fu County or Fuxian (富县), Shaanxi
- Wafangdian, formerly Fuxian or Fu County (复县), Liaoning
- Fuxian, Shuangliao (服先镇), town in Jilin

Fuxian is also an adjective that may refer to people with the Fux surname.
