= Storkau =

Storkau may refer to the following places in Germany:

- Storkau, Stendal
- Storkau, Weißenfels
