= Zertus =

German company

Zertus GmbH
- Industry: Food industry
- Founded: 1826 in Tangermünde, Saxony-Anhalt, Germany
- Founder: Friedrich Theodor Meyer
- Headquarters: Hamburg, Germany
- Website: www.zertus.de

Zertus GmbH (until 2002: "Zuckerraffinerie Tangermünde Fr. Meyers Sohn GmbH") is a German company in the food industry.

== History ==
In 1826 Friedrich Theodor Meyer (1796-1884) founded a small sugar refinery in Tangermünde. 1865 his sons took over the company ("Zuckerraffinerie Tangermünde Fr. Meyers son"). Under their management the company grew and from 1882 exported to England and overseas. Until 1903 only raw sugar was processed, but after the sugar itself was also processed. A production of tinned fruit started and from 1910 onwards chocolates and pralines were produced under the "Feodora" brand. Until the end of the Second World War the sugar refinery was the largest in Europe. After the end of the war, the company was expropriated in 1946 by the Soviet occupying power and mostly dismantled.

1949 the company was founded again in Hamburg and restarted production of Chocolate. In 1987 the chocolate factory Hachez (Bremen) was taken over, but sold again the year 2000. Since the eighties, the company has become a holding company. Several takeovers of other companies followed and in 2002 the "Zuckerraffinerie Tangermünde Fr. Meyer's Sohn GmbH" was renamed "Zertus GmbH". 2012 the company acquired the British Zetar Group.

== Brands ==
The following brands belong to Zertus:

- Importhaus Wilms
- Dextro Energy
- Kalfany Süße Werbung
- Kinnerton Confectionery
- Lir Chocolates
- Humdinger
- Bio-Zentrale
