= Emil Fuchs =

Emil Fuchs may refer to:

- Emil Fuchs (artist) (1866–1929), Austrian artist
- Emil Fuchs (baseball) (1878–1961), German-born American baseball owner and executive
- Emil Fuchs (theologian) (1874–1971), German theologian

== See also ==
- Fuchs (disambiguation)
