= Michael Fuchs =

Michael Fuchs may refer to:

- Michael J. Fuchs (born 1946), American television executive, former head of HBO
- Michael Fuchs (football) (1972–2011), Austrian football manager and retired footballer
- Michael Fuchs (badminton) (born 1982), German badminton player
- Michael Fuchs (politician) (1949–2022), German parliamentarian and Bundestag member
- Michael Fuchs (sculptor), sculpted the Medal of Suleiman in 1554
- Michael Fuchs (figure skater), German ice dancer, 1974 German gold medalist
