= Robert Fuchs =

Robert Fuchs may refer to:

- Robert Fuchs (composer) (1847–1927), Austrian composer and music teacher
- Robert Fuchs (general) (1895–1977), German general
- Robert Fuchs (footballer) (born 1975), Dutch footballer
- Robert Fuchs (rower) (born 1991), Polish rower
- Robert F. Fuchs, president of the American Orchid Society
