= Tanger (river) =

River in Germany

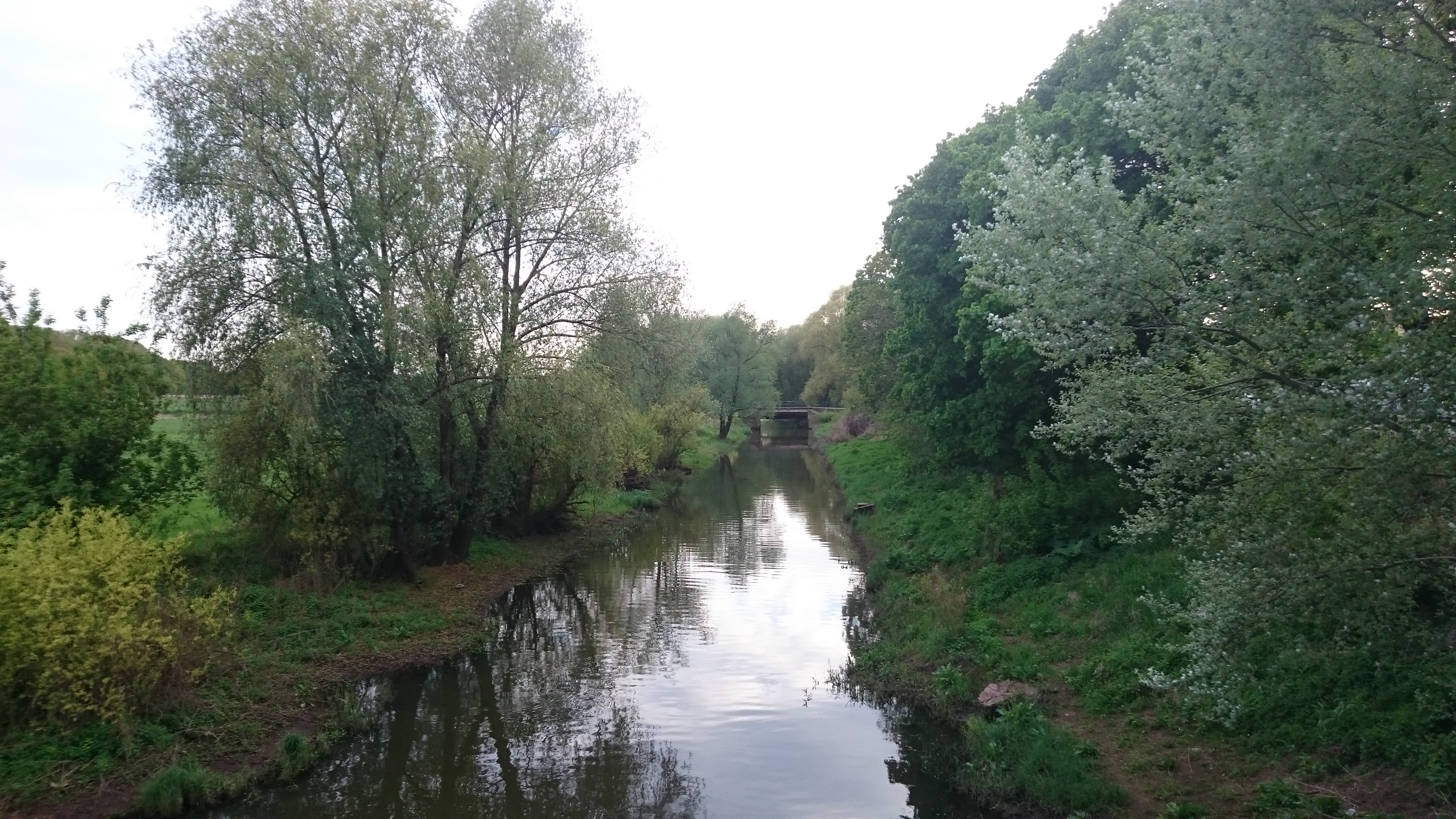

Location
- Country: Germany
- State: Saxony-Anhalt

Physical characteristics
- Source
  - elevation: ±80 m (260 ft)
- Mouth
  - location: Elbe
  - coordinates: 52.5413°N 11.9794°E
- Length: 33 km (21 mi)
- Basin size: 480 km^{2} (190 sq mi)

Basin features
- Progression: Elbe→ North Sea

The Tanger (German pronunciation: [ˈtaŋɐ]) is a small river of Saxony-Anhalt, Germany. It is a left tributary to the river Elbe at Tangermünde.

== See also ==
- List of rivers of Saxony-Anhalt
