= Josef Fuchs =

Josef Fuchs may refer to:

- Josef Fuchs (athlete) (born 1935), Austrian Paralympic athlete
- Josef Fuchs (cyclist) (born 1948), Swiss racing cyclist
- Josef Fuchs (theologian) (1912–2005), German Roman Catholic theologian and Jesuit priest

== See also ==
- Joseph Fuchs (1899–1997), American violinist and teacher
- Joseph Fuchs (1814–1888), French illustrator
- Fuchs (disambiguation)
