= Peter Fuchs (disambiguation) =

Peter Fuchs (1829–1898), was a German sculptor.

Peter Fuchs may refer to:

- Peter Fuchs (skier) (1955–1980), British alpine skier
- Peter Paul Fuchs (1916–2007), Austrian-American conductor and composer
