= Bruce Lundgren =

Australian rules footballer (1931–2003)

Personal information
- Full name: Bruce Lundgren
- Born: 11 November 1931
- Died: 8 May 2003 (aged 71)
- Original team: Camden
- Height: 174 cm (5 ft 9 in)
- Weight: 70 kg (154 lb)

Playing career^{1}
Years	Club	Games (Goals)
1952	St Kilda	4 (0)
- ^{1} Playing statistics correct to the end of 1952.

Bruce Lundgren (11 November 1931 – 8 May 2003) was an Australian rules footballer who played with St Kilda in the Victorian Football League (VFL).
