= Grobleben =

- Stadtteil of Tangermünde
- Interactive map of Grobleben
- Location within Germany Location within Saxony-Anhalt
- Coordinates: 52°31′36″N 11°54′0″E
- Country: Germany
- State: Saxony-Anhalt
- District: Stendal
- Town: Tangermünde

Area
  - Total: 3.83 km^{2} (1.48 sq mi)
- Elevation: 35 m (115 ft)

Population (2006-12-31)
  - Total: 102
  - Density: 26.6/km^{2} (69.0/sq mi)
- Time zone: UTC+01:00 (CET)
  - Summer (DST): UTC+02:00 (CEST)
- Postal codes: 39579
- Dialling codes: 039322
- Vehicle registration: SDL
- Website: www.tangermuende.de

Grobleben is a village and a former municipality in the district of Stendal, in Saxony-Anhalt, Germany. Since 1 January 2010, it is part of the town Tangermünde.
