= Michael Fuchs (football) =

Austrian football manager (1972–2011)

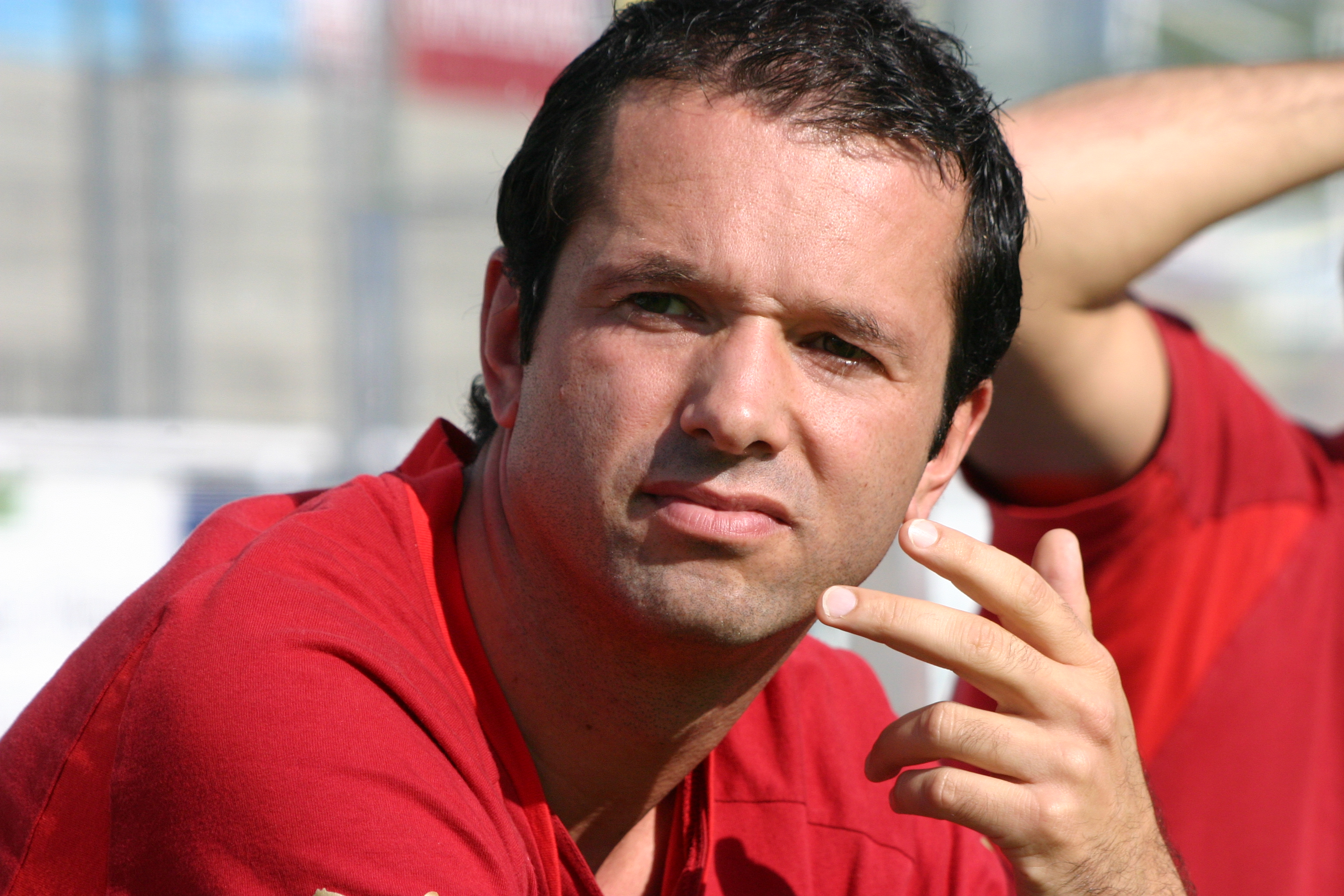

Personal information
- Date of birth: 6 June 1972
- Date of death: 15 March 2011 (aged 38)

Senior career*
Years	Team	Apps	(Gls)
- TUS Kirchbach
- SV Thal
- SK Seiersberg

Managerial career
- 2000–2010: FC Gratkorn
- * Club domestic league appearances and goals

Michael Fuchs (6 June 1972 – 15 March 2011) was an Austrian football player and football manager who managed FC Gratkorn.
