= Langensalzwedel =

- Stadtteil of Tangermünde
- Interactive map of Langensalzwedel
- Location within Germany Location within Saxony-Anhalt
- Coordinates: 52°34′59″N 11°56′23″E
- Country: Germany
- State: Saxony-Anhalt
- District: Stendal
- Town: Tangermünde

Area
  - Total: 6.91 km^{2} (2.67 sq mi)
- Elevation: 30 m (98 ft)

Population (2006-12-31)
  - Total: 186
  - Density: 26.9/km^{2} (69.7/sq mi)
- Time zone: UTC+01:00 (CET)
  - Summer (DST): UTC+02:00 (CEST)
- Postal codes: 39590
- Dialling codes: 039322
- Vehicle registration: SDL
- Website: www.tangermuende.de

Langensalzwedel is a village and a former municipality in the district of Stendal, in Saxony-Anhalt, Germany. Since 1 January 2010, it is part of the town Tangermünde.
