= Bruce Smith (Australian footballer) =

Australian rules footballer (1944–2026)

Personal information
- Full name: Bruce Smith
- Born: 28 June 1944
- Died: 16 July 2026 (aged 82)
- Original team: Hampton Scouts
- Height: 191 cm (6 ft 3 in)
- Weight: 83 kg (183 lb)

Playing career
Years	Club	Games (Goals)
1962, 1964	Richmond	11 (10)

Bruce Smith (28 June 1944 – 16 July 2026) was an Australian rules footballer who played with Richmond in the Victorian Football League (VFL). He died on 16 July 2026, at the age of 82.
