= Hämerten =

- Stadtteil of Tangermünde
- Interactive map of Hämerten
- Location within Germany Location within Saxony-Anhalt
- Coordinates: 52°35′35″N 11°58′59″E
- Country: Germany
- State: Saxony-Anhalt
- District: Stendal
- Town: Tangermünde

Area
  - Total: 6.74 km^{2} (2.60 sq mi)
- Elevation: 34 m (112 ft)

Population (2006-12-31)
  - Total: 211
  - Density: 31.3/km^{2} (81.1/sq mi)
- Time zone: UTC+01:00 (CET)
  - Summer (DST): UTC+02:00 (CEST)
- Postal codes: 39590
- Dialling codes: 039322
- Vehicle registration: SDL
- Website: www.tangermuende.de

Hämerten is a village and a former municipality in the district of Stendal, in Saxony-Anhalt, Germany. Since 1 January 2010, it is part of the town Tangermünde.
