= Marian Fuks =

Marian Fuks could refer to:

- Marian Fuks (photographer) (1884–1935), Polish filmmaker and pioneer of photography
- Marian Fuks (historian) (1914–2022), Polish historian
