= Johann Fuchs (disambiguation) =

Johann Fuchs was a German canoeist.

Johann Fuchs may refer to:

- Johann Nepomuk Fuchs (architect) (1727–1804), Austrian architect
- Johann Nepomuk Fuchs (composer) (1842–1899), Austrian composer and conductor
- Johann Nepomuk von Fuchs (1774–1856), German chemist
