= Buch, Saxony-Anhalt =

Buch
- Stadtteil of Tangermünde
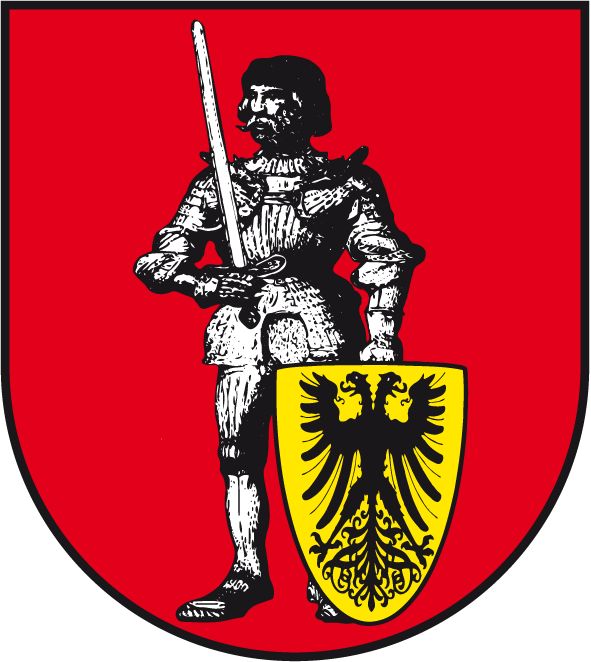
- Coat of arms
- Interactive map of Buch
- Location within Germany Location within Saxony-Anhalt
- Coordinates: 52°28′59″N 11°56′35″E
- Country: Germany
- State: Saxony-Anhalt
- District: Stendal
- Town: Tangermünde

Area
  - Total: 19.84 km^{2} (7.66 sq mi)
- Elevation: 32 m (105 ft)

Population (2006-12-31)
  - Total: 397
  - Density: 20.0/km^{2} (51.8/sq mi)
- Time zone: UTC+01:00 (CET)
  - Summer (DST): UTC+02:00 (CEST)
- Postal codes: 39517
- Dialling codes: 039362
- Vehicle registration: SDL
- Website: www.tangermuende.de

Buch (German pronunciation: [buːx]) is a village and a former municipality in the district of Stendal, in Saxony-Anhalt, Germany. Since 1 January 2010, it has been part of the town of Tangermünde.
