= Suzon Fuks =

Belgian artist (born 1959)

Suzon Fuks (born 1959) is Belgian–Australian interdisciplinary artist, whose work spans installation, performance, video, artist books, and wearable art. Her practice engages with themes at the intersection of art, science, and ecology, and is informed by movement-based research and participatory processes. She is the founder of the online platform Waterwheel.

== Biography ==
Fuks trained in dance, theatre and music at the Lillian Lambert Academy, Brussels (1969-1976), she completed her master's in Visual Arts at La Cambre (1979-1984). She has directed works for stage and screen, including movement-based intermedia performances, film, video-scenography and installation. She has directed and edited more than films and videos including 17 dance-on-screen works, and co-devised numerous online interactive performance projects.

Awards and fellowships include an Australia Council for the Arts Fellowship, a Copeland Fellowship at Amherst College [3], and a Research Associate position at the Five College Women's Studies Research Center. She received a Green Room Award for Video Scenography (Theatre New Form) for The Quivering. Other distinctions include a Choreographic Fellowship at the Australian Choreographic Centre, an Asialink Residency, and the René Praile Creativity and Most Innovative Show Award at the Performance d'Acteur Cannes Festival with The Strange Mr Knight. Her screendance fragmentation [4] was nominated for a ReelDance award (2007) and an Australian Dance on Film Award.

Fuks was selected for La Jeune Peinture Belge in 1981 and 1983, and exhibited at the Palais des Beaux-Arts, Brussels.

== Practice ==
Fuks’ work addresses themes including the material life of technologies, the status of women, displacement, and water. Her projects are typically developed through participatory, site-responsive, and collaborative approaches. Since the early 2000s, she has been involved in internet-based performance, contributing to transnational projects connecting artists, scientists, and communities,

In 2011, she founded Waterwheel, an online platform for interdisciplinary collaboration and exchange, developed as part of an Australia Council Fellowship in collaboration with Igneous and Inkahoots. The platform enabled international participation in media sharing, performance, and discussion, with a focus on water-related issues.

Since 2019, her work has focused on electronic waste as both material and subject. Through the dismantling of obsolete devices, she examines their internal structures and material composition. This research informs installations, performances, artist books, and wearable works.

Her ongoing project e-Galaxy combines these elements in participatory installations and public programs. It has been presented at events and venues including the Prague Quadrennial (National Gallery), the Magdalena Festival (Montpellier), the State Library of Queensland (Knowledge Walk, Brisbane), and Espace Mendès France (Poitiers).

== Career and collaborations ==
Fuks gives lectures, workshops, master classes and labs in Australia, US, and Europe focusing on the integration of visual media and the performing arts.

In 2002, she undertook a mentorship in networked performance practices with Keith Armstrong, Kelli Dipple and Mike Stubbs through an Australian Council New Media arts grant. She continued this work and presented at the UpStage Festivals (2007–2010), Backyard Dances for Electromog Festival and the Live, Media and Performance lab and participated in 10 at EMPAC, New York. .

Fuks is a founding member of cyberformance group ActiveLayers (UK, NZ, Aus).

From 1997 to 2024, she served as co-artistic director of Igneous, an interdisciplinary performance organisation. Igneous undertook residencies and development projects, including a six-week residency at Brisbane Powerhouse in collaboration with Kalaripayatt master Vinildas Gurukkal.

Fuks’ photographic works are held in the collections of the State Library of New South Wales.
