= Bruce K. Reid =

Australian rules footballer

Bruce Reid

Personal information
- Full name: Bruce K. Reid
- Born: 17 March 1950
- Died: 15 June 1970 (aged 20)
- Original team: Leeton
- Height: 183 cm (6 ft 0 in)
- Weight: 80 kg (176 lb)

Playing career^{1}
| Years | Club | Games (Goals) |
| 1968–1969 | South Melbourne | 5 (0) |
- ^{1} Playing statistics correct to the end of 1969.

Bruce K. Reid (17 March 1950 – 15 June 1970) was an Australian rules footballer who played with South Melbourne in the Victorian Football League (VFL).

Reid came from the New South Wales town of Leeton, which was in South Melbourne's zone. He made two appearances for South Melbourne in the 1968 VFL season, as a half back flanker. The following year he was tried, without success, at full-forward.

He was killed in a car accident in 1970.
