= Robert F. Fuchs =

Robert F. Fuchs was the 38th President of the American Orchid Society. An accredited American Orchid Society judge.

== Honors ==
- Life Member American Orchid Society
- Florida Horticultural Hall of Fame
- Co-chairman and President of the 19th World Orchid Conference
