= Thomas Fuchs =

German artist (born 1969)

- Born: January 27, 1969 (age 57)
- Education: Staatliche Akademie der Bildenden Künste Stuttgart
- Known for: Illustration, Graphic Design
- Website: www.thomasfuchs.com

Thomas Fuchs (born January 27, 1969) is an illustrator and graphic designer.

Fuchs studied graphic design and illustration with the illustrious Heinz Edelmann at the State Academy of Fine Arts in Stuttgart. After completing his studies with an MFA in '97, he moved to New York in November of the same year. His work has appeared in most publications in the US, including The New York Times, The New Yorker, Time, Rolling Stone, GQ, Scientific American, Texas Monthly, The Wall Street Journal, Mother Jones and Esquire. He's a regular contributor to Wirtschaftswoche and Frankfurter Allgemeine Zeitung in Germany. He has worked on numerous projects in design and advertising, for clients as varied as Landor, Enterprise IG, Hasbro and SpotCo. His work has received numerous awards from The Society of Illustrators (Gold Medal), American Illustration, SPD, Print, the Art Directors Club of New York and Germany (of which he is a member) among others.

Apart from his commercial work, he regularly creates image series as visual commentaries in response to political and societal tendencies. In 2004 he released GOP 100: Deconstructing Dumbo, 100 reinterpretations of the GOP logo with fellow designer Felix Sockwell. He frequently lectures at art schools such as the Academy of Fine Arts in Stuttgart and holds illustration workshops for various institutions like the Art Directors Club of Germany After fifteen years in New York City, Fuchs moved to Berlin in 2012 where he currently lives and works.

== Awards ==
- The Society of Illustrators (Gold Medal, Advertising and Institutional Category)
- American Illustration
- Communication Arts
- Print
- SPD (Silver Medal)
- Art Directors Club of New York
- The Art Directors Club Germany
- SND (Silver Medal)

== Books ==
- (2004) GOP 100: Deconstructing Dumbo (with Felix Sockwell)
- (2007) Illustration Now! (Taschen, Germany)
- (2012) Luerzer's 200 Best Illustrators 11/12

== Shows ==
- (2006) Gallery Nine, New York Times Building, New York, NY
- (2009) Hotel De Vil, Stuttgart, Germany
- (2012) Kultur 123 Stadt Rüsselsheim, Rüsselsheim, Germany
