= Kurt Fuchs =

Austrian soldier (1919–1945)

- Born: August 27, 1919; Graz, Austria
- Died: March 8, 1945 (aged 25); Vienna, Nazi Germany
- Cause of death: Execution by firing squad
- Military career
- Allegiance: Nazi Germany
- Branch: Wehrmacht
- Unit: Strafbattalion No. 17
- Known for: Deserting from the Wehrmacht
- Conflicts: World War II

Kurt Fuchs (August 27, 1919 – March 8, 1945) was an Austrian soldier in the German Wehrmacht during World War II who deserted. He was executed by a firing squad in Vienna barely a month before the Vienna fell to the Vienna offensive of the Red Army.

== Life ==
Fuchs was from Graz, where he was a bartender. He was drafted at the age of nineteen. In 1943 he was put of trial four times, twice because of unauthorized absence, and sentenced to six years in military prison. However, instead of putting him in prison, the Nazis sent him to Strafbattalion No. 17 to fight the Russians. During a brief stay at a military hospital, Fuchs successfully fled from the Nazi military authorities. He claimed to have lost his Soldbuch and was thereafter transferred to France, later on to troops in St. Pölten. On August 20, 1944 he reached Vienna and went AWOL again. Passersby detected Fuchs, reported him to the police and he was arrested again on October 24, 1944.

The trial took place at the court of Division Oo. 177. The defendant stated that he wanted to avoid a return to the Strafbattalion at any cost. But he also claimed to have had the intention to join elsewhere as a free soldier. The court interpreted this to mean that he intended to wait out the war in Vienna. On December 29, 1944, he was sentenced to death. ″According to the court's opinion, the defendant is not to be seen any longer as a useful member of the German Volk and therefore it would be completely inappropriate to drag him along in times when countless fighters of best German blood have to give up their lives.″

Two months later, on February 20, 1945, Fuchs was indicted again, this time because of Wehrkraftzersetzung (undermining military morale). The court found him guilty of self-injury and assistance to self-injury. The death sentence of the previous trial had not yet been confirmed; the new sentence was six years in prison. On March 8, 1945, Kurt Fuchs was executed by a firing squad, 25 days before the Red Army began to take Vienna.

== Sources ==
- Brigitte Bailer; Wolfgang Maderthaner; Kurt Scholz, eds. (2013), "Die Vollstreckung verlief ohne Besonderheiten". Hinrichtungen in Wien, 1938 – 1945 (PDF) (in German), Wien: Mandelbaum Verlag, pp. 59–61
- Lisa Rettl (2010), "Leopold Breitler – eine Richterkarriere zwischen Anpassung und Pflichterfüllung" (PDF), in Thomas Geldmacher; Magnus Koch; Hannes Metzler; Peter Pirker; Lisa Rettl (eds.), "Da Machen wir nicht mehr mit ...": Österreichische Soldaten und Zivilisten vor Gerichten der Wehrmacht (in German) (1. ed.), Wien: Mandelbaum Verlag, pp. 210–211, ISBN 978-3-85476-341-3
