= Walter Robert Fuchs =

American-German science communicator (1937–1976)

Walter Robert Fuchs (March 18, 1937 – July 21, 1976) was an American-German science communicator.

== Life and work ==
Fuchs was born in Princeton, where his father worked as a bank clerk. He went to Memmingen school (graduating in 1956), was trained as an electrician and mechanic, and then studied electrical engineering at the Munich Technical University as well as physics, mathematics and philosophy at the Ludwig-Maximilians-Universität München. With a dissertation on "Logical problems of classical mechanics and quantum theory", he received his doctorate in 1961. In 1962, he was a business editor at television program of Bavarian Radio studios. From 1965, he had headed the editorial of Applied Science and Technology. Fuchs spent his life in Munich and died at the age of 39 from cancer.

Fuchs wrote mostly in German; his books were translated into English and other languages and met an internationally wide audience. In 1970, his books had a total circulation of 750,000 sold copies, especially for math and science subjects. Modern mathematics was translated into fourteen languages, as in the later 1960s, and it helped to popularize the concepts of sets theory.

Fuchs was a trained artist and supplied many of the templates for the illustrations of his own works; in his time in Munich, he played clarinet and saxophone in various jazz bands. In 1972, he published his satire The Dogs Planet, a fiction novel.

== Bibliography ==
- Logical Investigations to problems in classical mechanics and quantum theory (dissertation) 1961
- Knaurs book of modern mathematics Droemer / Knaur, 1966, 1972 (translated into English: Mathematics for the modern mind, MacMillan 1967).
- Knaurs book of modern physics. Droemer / Knaur 1965th
- Knaurs Book of thinking machines -. Information theory and cybernetics Knaur 1968th
- Knaurs book of electronics.
- Parents discover the new mathematics. Quantities and numbers 1970th
- Knaurs book of the New Learning. 1969th
- Parents discover the new logic.
- And Muhammad is their prophet -. The Arabs and their world 1975th
- Rebus from the drawing board - an introduction to the modern philosophy Knaur 1972 (on analytic philosophy)..
- Before the earth moved - a world history of physics DVA 1975th.
- Formula and fantasy -. A world history of mathematics DVA 1977 (the book was never finished and treated essentially only the antiquity), rororo 1979th
- Life under distant suns? Droemer / Knaur 1973rd
- The Dog Planet -. Canedusische thought one story Droemer / Knauer 1973rd
- Poetry as editor of our mid-century, Kösel Verlag 1965 (with interpretations of fox).
