= Miltern =

- Stadtteil of Tangermünde
- Interactive map of Miltern
- Location within Germany Location within Saxony-Anhalt
- Coordinates: 52°34′N 11°55′E
- Country: Germany
- State: Saxony-Anhalt
- District: Stendal
- Town: Tangermünde

Area
  - Total: 10.57 km^{2} (4.08 sq mi)
- Elevation: 34 m (112 ft)

Population (2006-12-31)
  - Total: 395
  - Density: 37.4/km^{2} (96.8/sq mi)
- Time zone: UTC+01:00 (CET)
  - Summer (DST): UTC+02:00 (CEST)
- Postal codes: 39590
- Dialling codes: 039322
- Vehicle registration: SDL
- Website: www.tangermuende.de

Miltern is a village and a former municipality in the district of Stendal, in Saxony-Anhalt, Germany. Since 1 January 2010, it is part of the town Tangermünde.
