= Henry Fuchs (disambiguation) =

Henry Fuchs (born 1948) is an American academic.

Henry Fuchs may also refer to:

- Henry Fuchs (baseball) (1879–1947), also known as Jacob Fox, American baseball player
- Henry Fuchs, born Henryk Tauber (1917–2000), Holocaust survivor
