= Tangermünde =

- Town
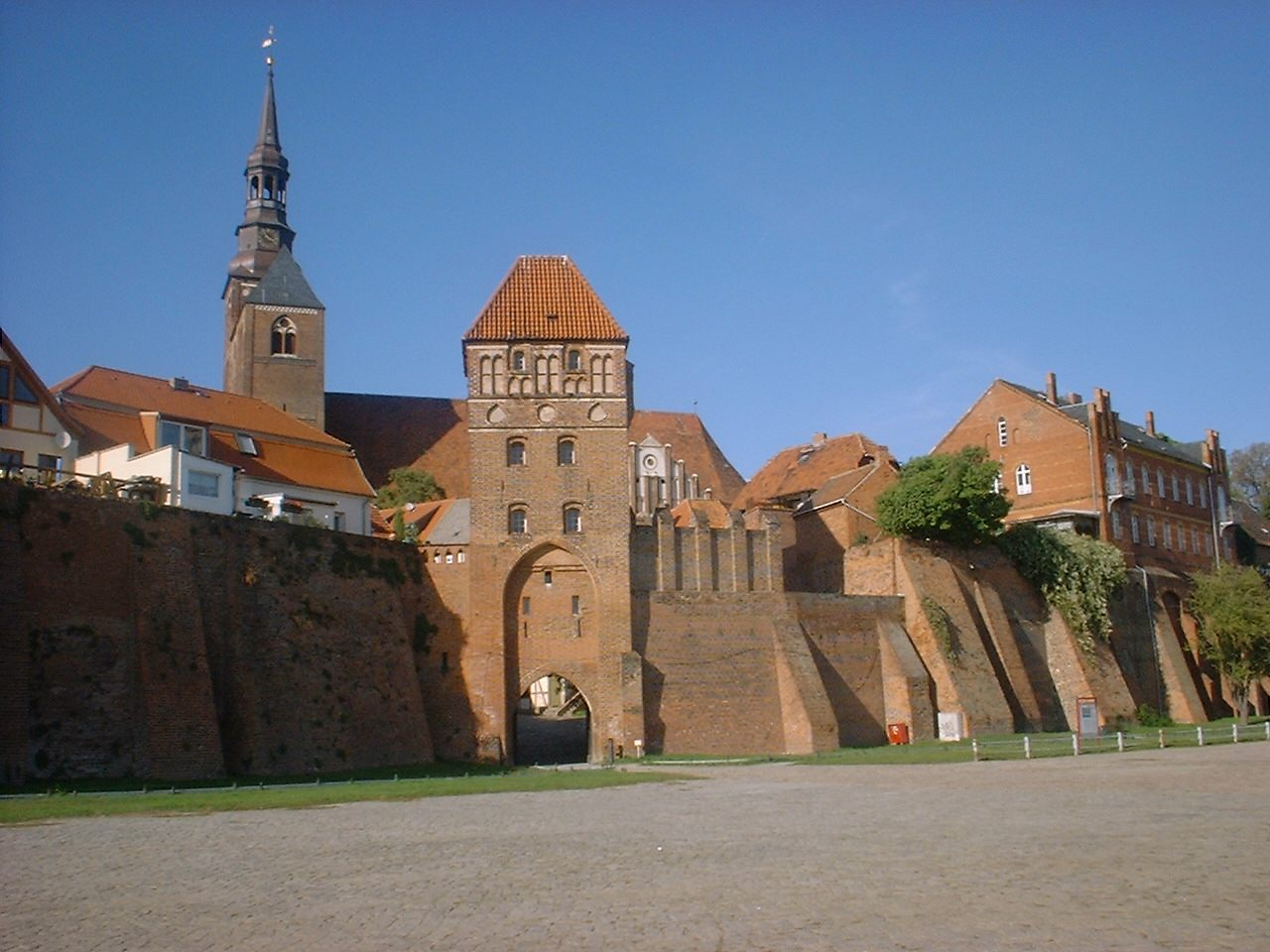
- Elbe Gate and St. Stephen's Church

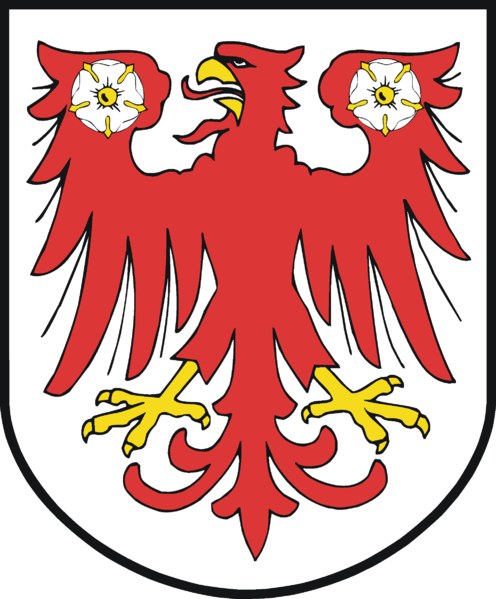
- Coat of arms

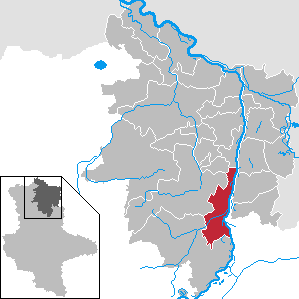
- Location of Tangermünde within Stendal district
- Interactive map of Tangermünde
- Location within Germany Location within Saxony-Anhalt
- Coordinates: 52°32′27″N 11°58′8″E
- Country: Germany
- State: Saxony-Anhalt
- District: Stendal

Government
  - Mayor (2022–29): Steffen Schilm

Area
  - Total: 89.88 km^{2} (34.70 sq mi)
- Elevation: 43 m (141 ft)

Population (2025-12-31)
  - Total: 10,165
  - Density: 113.1/km^{2} (292.9/sq mi)
- Time zone: UTC+01:00 (CET)
  - Summer (DST): UTC+02:00 (CEST)
- Postal codes: 39585–39590
- Dialling codes: 039322
- Vehicle registration: SDL
- Website: www.tangermuende.de

Tangermünde (German: [taŋɐˈmʏndə]; Low German: Tangermünn) is a historic town on the Elbe River in the district of Stendal, in the northeastern part of Saxony-Anhalt, Germany. The town has land area of around 89.87 sq.km (34.70 sq.mi) and a population of 10,283 people as of 2022.

== Geography ==
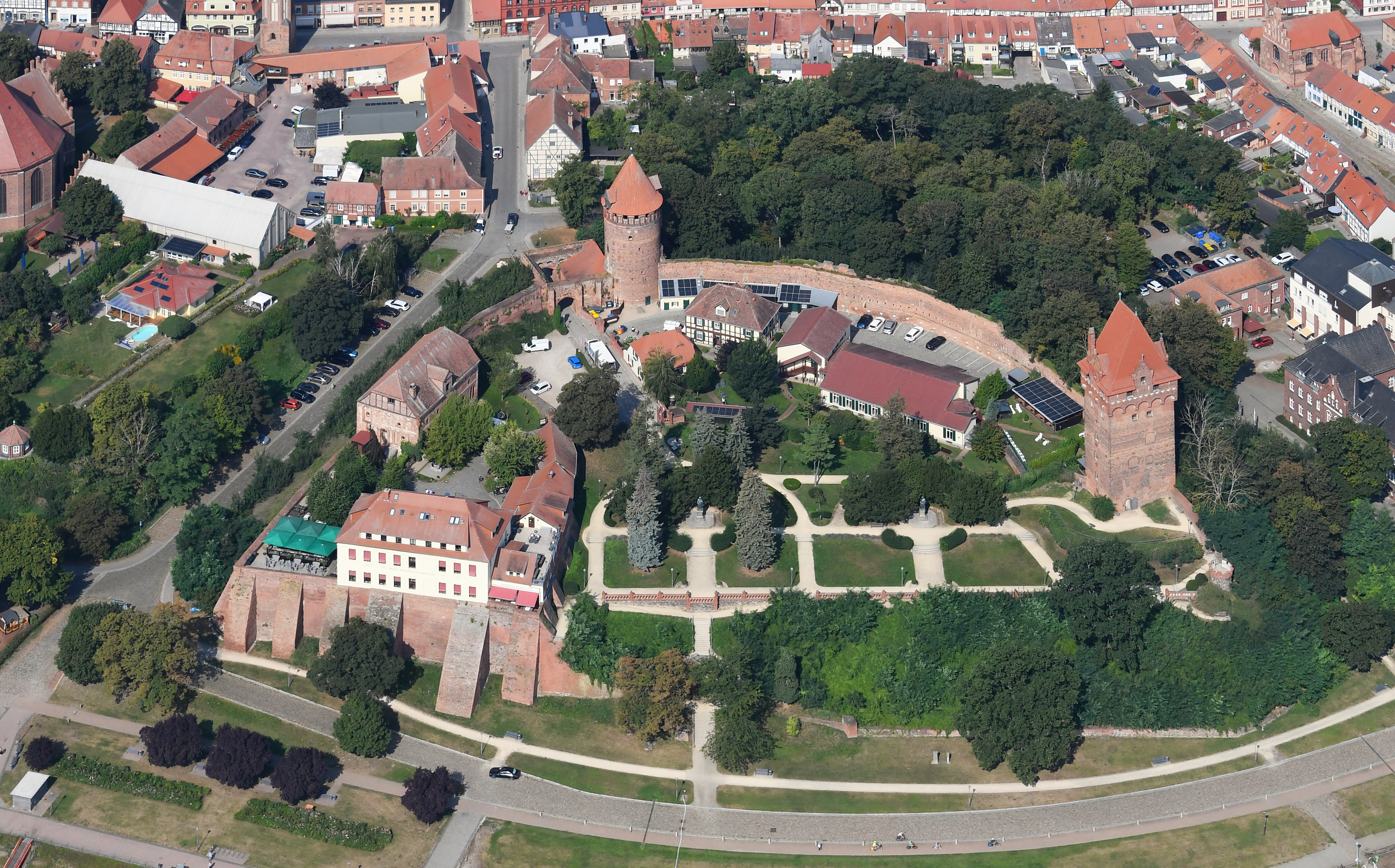
Aerial view of Tangermünde Castle

Tangermünde is situated in the historic Altmark region of the North German Plain, on a glacial terminal moraine, above the left shore of the Elbe. The town's name derives from the mouth (German: Mündung) of the Tanger tributary. The altitude protects it from floods.

Since the administrative restructuring effective January 1, 2010, the area of Tangermünde comprises the former municipalities of Bölsdorf, Buch, Grobleben, Hämerten, Langensalzwedel, Miltern, and Storkau. These former municipalities are now Ortschaften (divisions) of the town Tangermünde.

== History ==
Tangermünde can look back at a thousand-year-long history as already in 1009 the medieval chronicler Bishop Thietmar of Merseburg referred to a local lowland castle, which probably had been erected in the early 10th century during the rule of King Henry the Fowler at the border with the lands of the Polabian Slavs incorporated into the Saxon Marca Geronis.

The town itself was first mentioned in a 1275 deed, governed by a succession of vogts (reeves), such as Ruthger von Blumenthal. Due to its favourable location, it soon became a point where tolls were charged on boats sailing along the Elbe River as well as a residence of the Ascanian margraves of Brandenburg. Margrave John II hid his treasure under the parish church, and passed the secret to his brother Otto with the arrow. When the latter was held to ransom by the citizens of Magdeburg in 1278, he used the treasure to pay for his release.

Upon the extinction of the Ascanian dynasty, the town was one of the favourite places of the Luxembourg emperor Charles IV, who had purchased the Margraviate of Brandenburg in 1373 and had Tangermünde Castle (German: Burg Tangermünde) rebuilt as a Kaiserpfalz, including a chapter of Canons Regular. From 1415 onwards, it became the residence of the Hohenzollern electors, after the Nuremberg burgrave Frederick VI was enfeoffed with Brandenburg by Charles' son Emperor Sigismund.

The 15th century marked the "Golden Age" of Tangermünde, an affluent member of the Hanseatic League, when numerous Brick Gothic buildings including the town hall and St. Stephen's parish church arose, surrounded by an almost entirely preserved city wall with well-fortified gates and the castle complex. However, after a 1488 revolt of the Tangermünde citizens against an excise tax on beer, the town lost the grace of Elector John Cicero, and the residence was relocated to Berlin-Cölln.

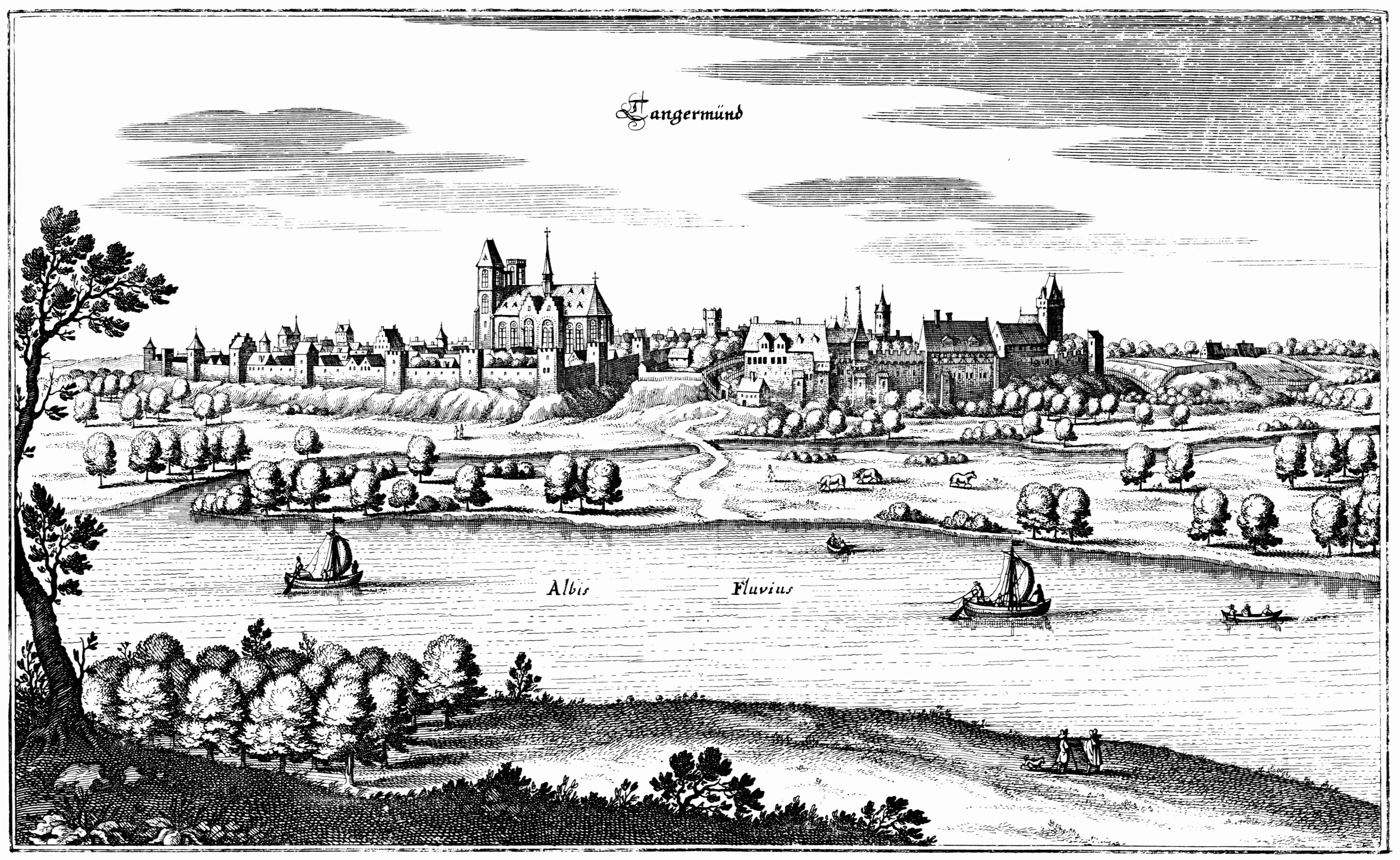
Tangermünd, 17th-century engraving by Matthäus Merian

On 13 September 1617 Tangermünde was almost completely destroyed by a fire, allegedly started as an act of revenge by a townswoman who had vainly sued at the local court for her inheritance. Accused of arson and burned at the stake in 1619, her story was perpetuated by Theodor Fontane's historical novel Grete Minde. The town was rebuilt with a variety of half-timbered houses lending it a unique appearance. However, after the castle had been slighted by Swedish troops during the Thirty Years' War in 1640, Tangermünde lost its strategic importance. Elector Frederick III (as Frederick I King in Prussia from 1701 on) had a local administrative building erected in 1699. The present-day complex is a reconstruction of the early 20th century.

In 1826 a sugar refinery was established as the town's main employer, which from 1910 manufactured the popular Feodora chocolate, today part of the Hachez company. As an effect of Tangermünde's decreasing importance, its historic centre and the city walls were largely preserved in its original appearance.

Tangermünde was not hit by severe damage during World War II until elements of the U.S. Army closed on the city and its strategic bridge across the Elbe River on 12 April 1945, triggering a brief but fierce battle, during which the modern (1933) combined rail and highway bridge was blown up by retreating German forces. In the closing days of the war Tangermünde was the scene of one of the last skirmishes of the war and the surrender en masse of the German 12th Army and remnants of the 9th Army to U.S. Forces. Between 4 May and 7 May 1945, as many as 100,000 German soldiers and civilians crossed the rickety ruins of the bridge on foot until Soviet forces reached the east bank of the Elbe. Since German reunification the old town has been gradually restored.

== Sights ==
=== Town hall ===
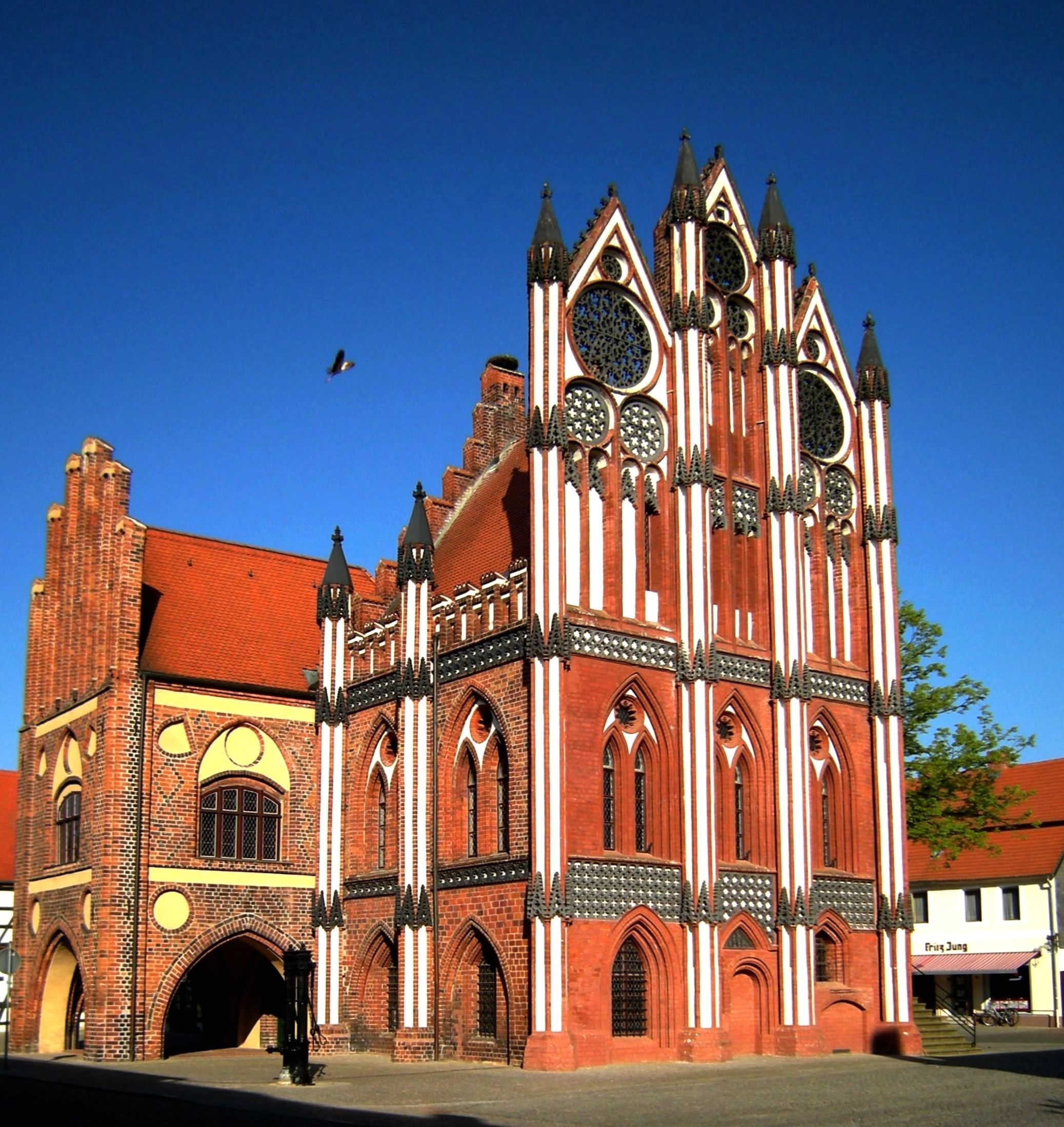
Town hall

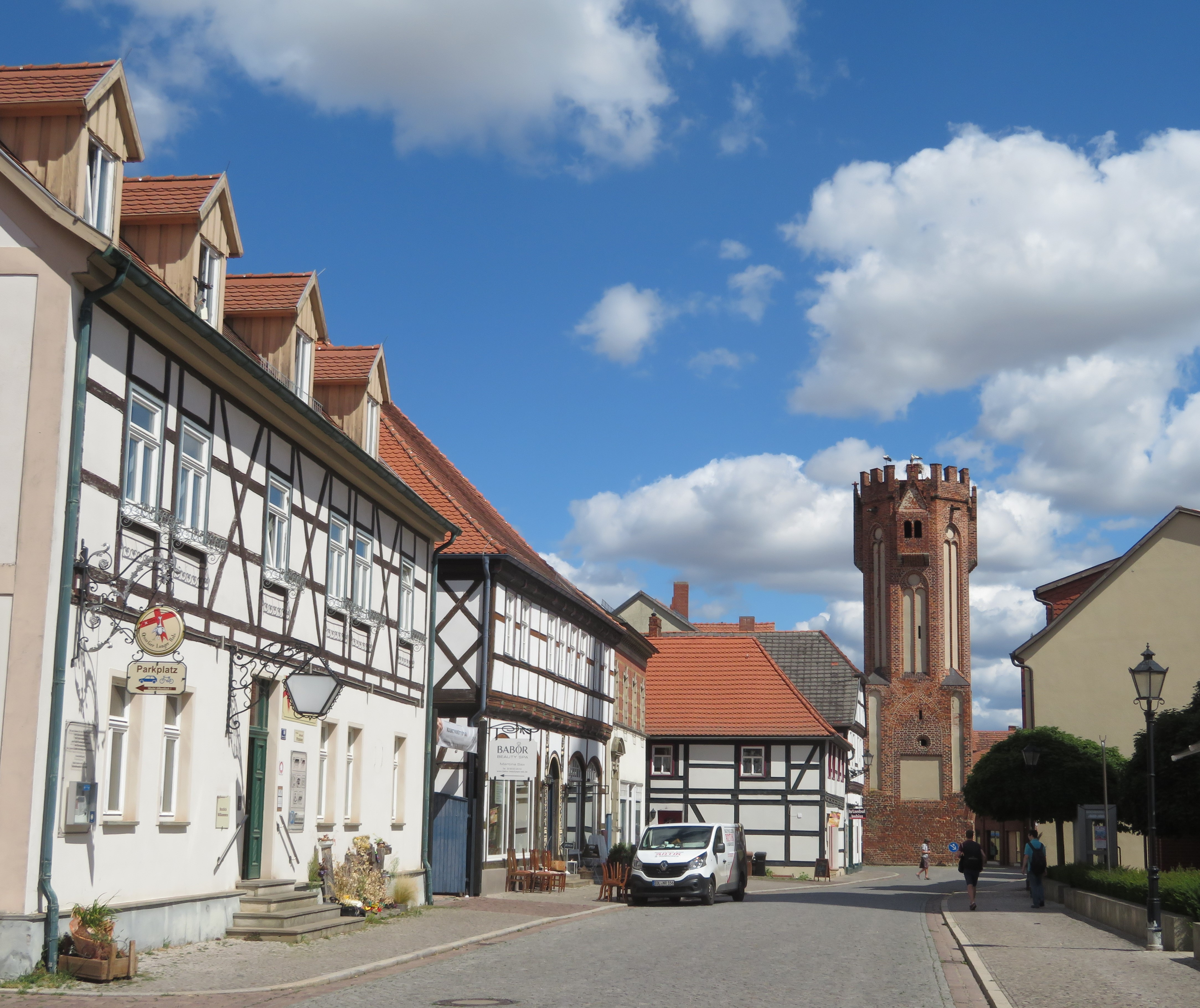
Main Street Lange Straße and Eulenturm tower

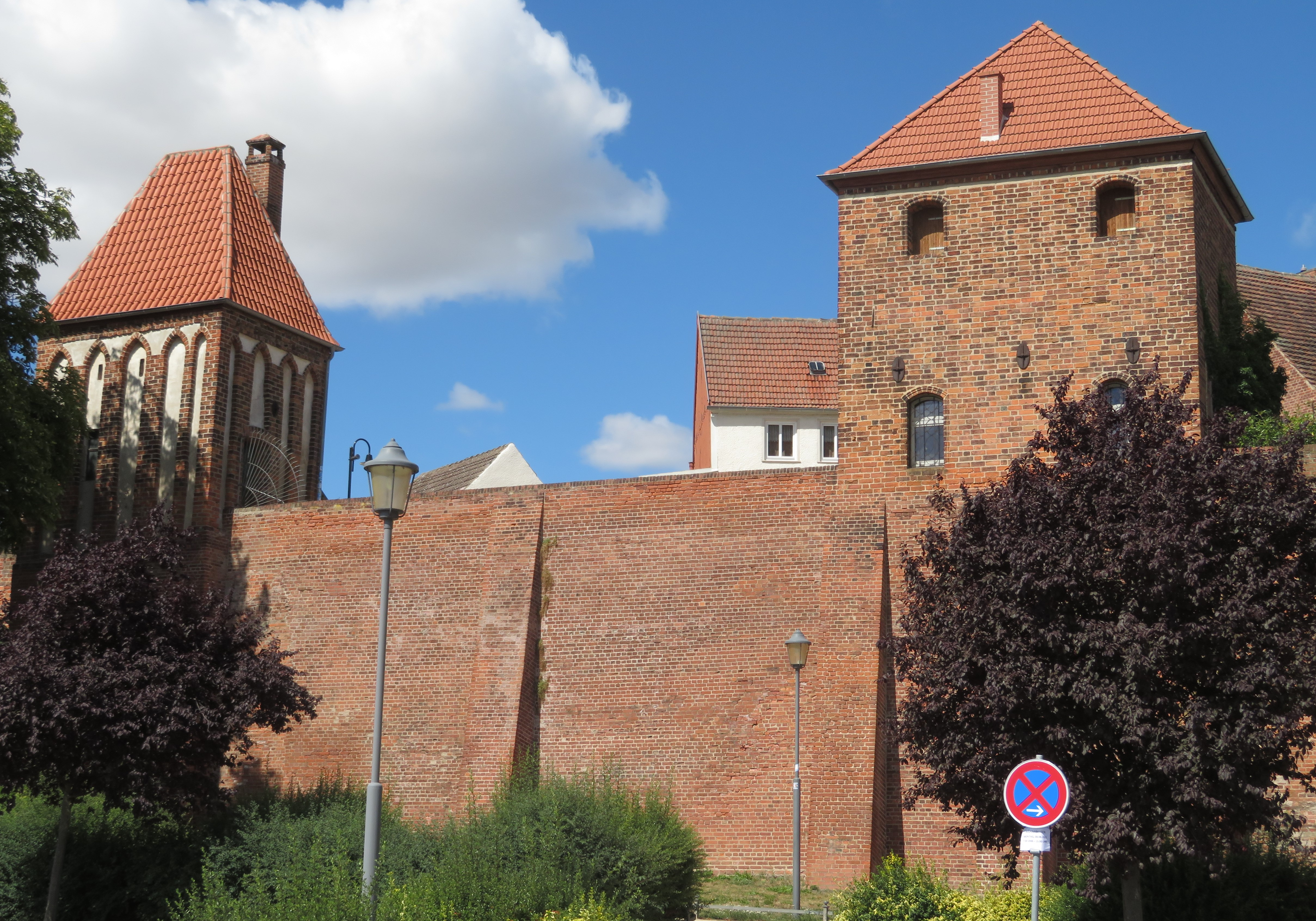
Medieval city wall

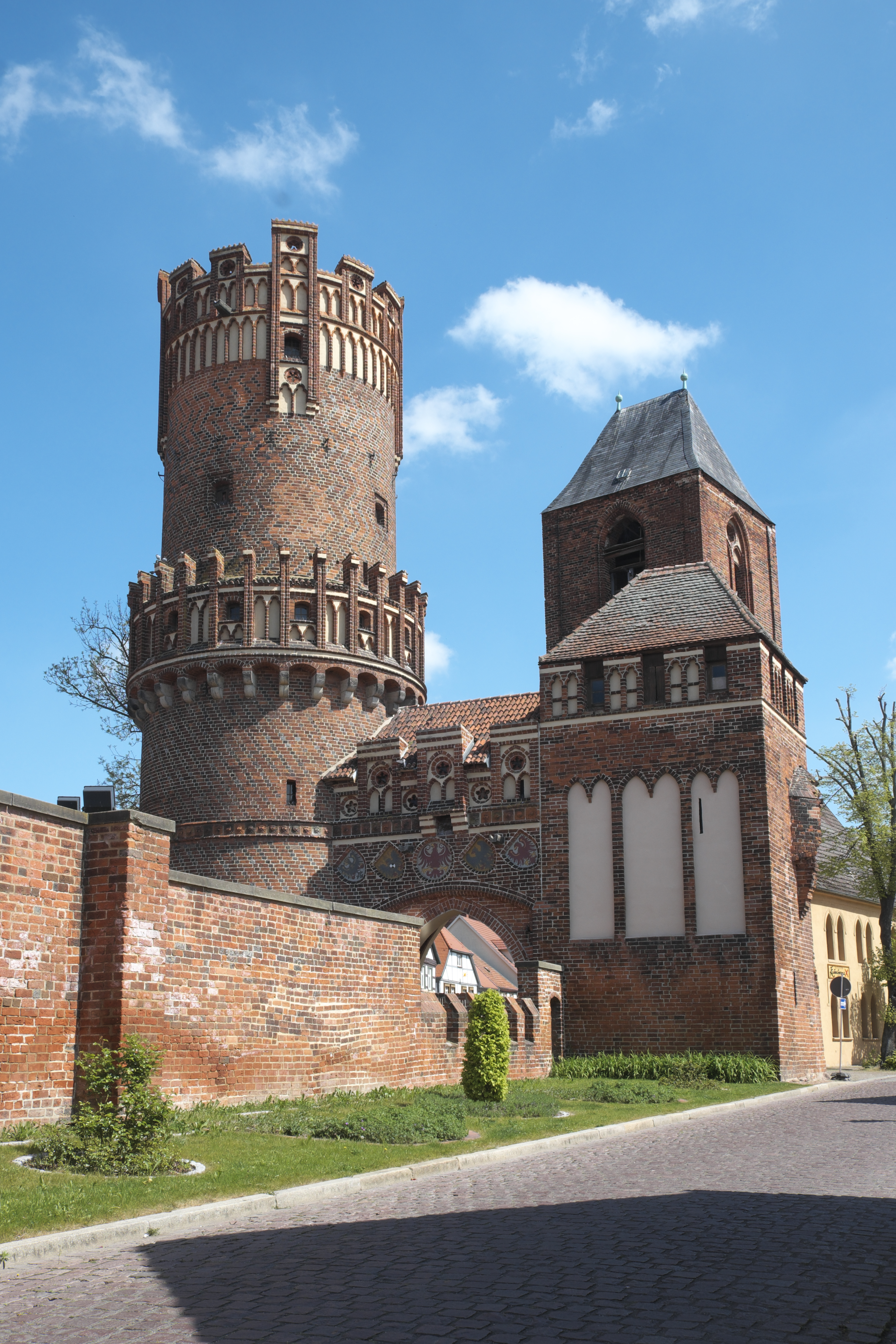
Neustädter Tor and former St. Nicolai Church

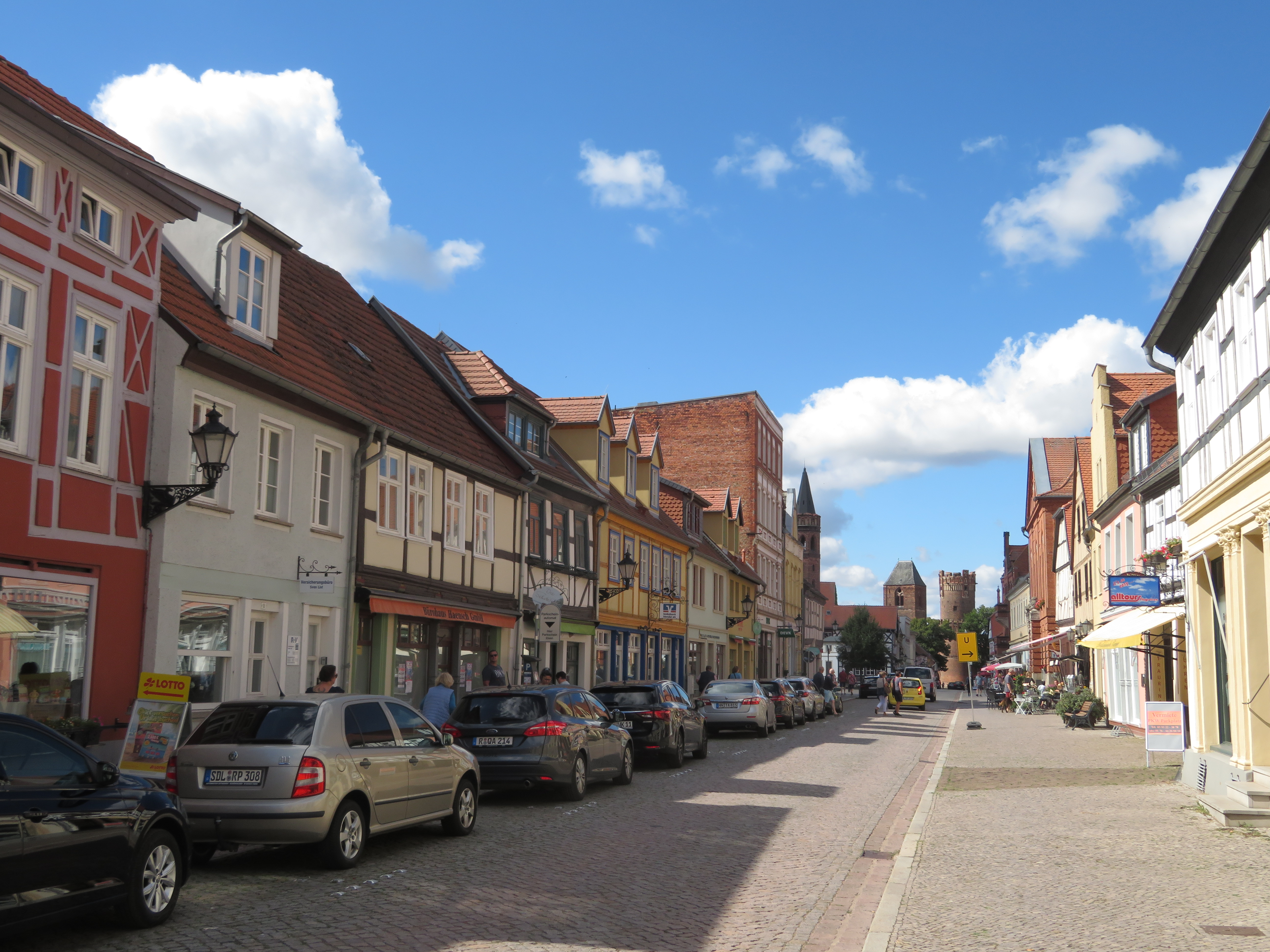
Main Street Lange Straße, southern part

The Tangermünde Town Hall is a late medieval building constructed in the 1430s. In German, this building is referred to as Rathaus and serves as a civic meeting center. The building performs a secular purpose, as a town hall for the community, but its exterior is evocative of a mixture of Romanesque and Gothic features. This building contains gothic and Romanesque structural elements that appear on the exterior of the building (the interior of the building has not been widely photographed).

Some of the more prominent features of the town hall are its high gables. On the façade are three staggered gables, with one central gable extending above the peak height of the roofline. These gables are a feature of brick architecture during this period. Adorning each gable are miniature spires, evocative of high gothic architecture popularized on cathedral exteriors. Each gable contains one large central circular window with two smaller ones below it, all with highly decorative tracery. These central circular windows are reminiscent of the grandiose rose windows that appear on the west façade of many gothic cathedrals. "The most remarkable feature is the gable end richly decorated with octagon buttresses, having stories of canopied niches—the gable is stepped between these buttresses". This observational analysis of the building dates from late 19th century, therefore its terminology differs from modern architectural jargon.

The ground floor windows and doorways feature ornamental archivolted brickwork. The exterior visual palette consists of red brick, white highlighting and trabeation, and dark blue tracery and decorative grilles.

=== St. Stephen's Church ===
This church was built in several stages. Nothing is left of the original construction, because it burned in the town fire of 1617. The church has a Scherer organ built in 1624, one of the top 10 organs in Europe. It has been completely restored.

=== Burg Tangermünde ===
The castle overlooking the inland harbour and the valley of river Elbe was founded around 925 and enlarged by Charles IV, Holy Roman Emperor in 1373. It burnt down in 1640 and was reconstructed in 1902. Its oldest building is Alte Kanzlei dating from the 14th century. The tower above the entrance gate was used as a prison, therefore its name Gefängnisturm (Prison Tower). The other tower (Kapitelturm) measuring 50 metres in height, dates from 1376 and offers an impressive view of the town and its surroundings.

=== Medieval City Wall ===
The old centre of Tangermünde is surrounded by a well-preserved city wall the construction of which was started around 1300. It was repaired and renovated several times as it protected the town against floods of river Elbe. Neustädter Tor is an impressive gate dating from 1450 opposite a former church (St. Nicolaikirche) which was built in the 12th century. Its belltower dates from 1470. Wassertor is another impressive gate of the medieval city wall. Various towers are preserved as well. The Shot tower (Schrotturm) measuring 47 metres in height is the tallest tower. The foundations of Eulenturm Tower (24 metres), the oldest defensive tower of Tangermünde, where laid around 1300. Another fortified tower is preserved in Schulstrasse, a small lane in the southwest of the old town centre.

== Politics ==
Seats in the town's assembly (Stadtrat) as of 2009 local elections:

- Christian Democratic Union (CDU): 9
- The Left: 4
- Social Democratic Party of Germany (SPD): 3
- Free Democratic Party (FDP): 2
- Free Voters: 1
- Independent: 1

=== International relations ===
Tangermünde is twinned with:

- Lich, Germany
- Minden, Germany
- Wissembourg, France
- Tavarnelle Val di Pesa, Italy

== Transportation ==
North of the town lies the Bundesstraße 188 (B 188) which connects it to Stendal and Rathenow, as well as, via the Autobahn A 2, to Berlin and Hanover. The river Elbe is crossed by a new bridge built in 2001.

The first road bridge was opened for the traffic in 1933 and blown up in the last days of the Second World War in 1945. The Elbe River was then the frontier between the Soviet and Allied armies' respective zones of occupation; thousands of German troops and civilian refugees alike crossed the river on foot, climbing along the wreckage of the bridge to escape from advancing Soviet forces, which was documented by Allied cameramen. Shortly afterwards, a temporary bridge was constructed, which served until 2001.

There is a railway line which connects the town with Stendal. The first line was opened in 1886.

== Sons and daughters of the town ==
- Albrecht Achilles (1414–1486), elector of Brandenburg
- Almuth Berger (born 1943), theologian
- Walter Meyer (1904–1949), rower, Olympic champion
- Grete Minde († 1619 executed), historical figure
- Fritz Schröder (SPD) de:Fritz Schröder (Politiker, 1891) (1891–1937), politician (SPD)
- Conrad Steinbrecht (de) (1849–1923), architect, construction officer
- Burghard Stück (de) (1929–2008), pediatrician and immunologist
- Reinhard Weis (de) (born 1949), pastor and politician (SPD)
