= Hachez =

Chocolate manufacturer

Bremer HACHEZ Chocolade GmbH & Co. KG
- Company type: Aktieselskab
- Industry: Chocolate production
- Founded: 1 July 1890 in Bremen
- Founder: Joseph Emil Hachez
- Defunct: 2019
- Fate: Company acquired in 2012, brand sold in 2019
- Successor: Hanseatisches Chocoladen Kontor GmbH & Co. KG
- Headquarters: Bremen, Germany
- Products: Chocolate
- Number of employees: 360 (2015)
- Website: www.hachez.de

Hachez (French pronunciation: [aʃe]) was a chocolate manufacturing company based in Bremen in northern Germany. It was founded in 1890 by Joseph Emile Hachez and Gustav Linde. The Feodora pralines and chocolate brand has been part of the company since 1953. In 2012, the Danish confectionery company Toms took over the company, which is now run under the name Hanseatisches Chocoladen Kontor. Production has been taking place in Nowa Sól in Poland since 2020.

== History ==
The company was founded by Joseph Emile Hachez and his business partner Gustav Linde in 1890. Joseph Emil Hachez was the great-grandson of Joseph Johan Hachez, who was born in Bruges, emigrated to Bremen in the 18th century and married the daughter of a local merchant in 1785. In 1894, the company moved from the Bremer Altstadt district to the Weserstrasse in the Neustadt district left of the Weser, where the company's headquarters remained until it was taken over by Toms. In 1910, Otto Friedrich Hasse joined the company as a shareholder. In 1923, Hasse created thin chocolate bars called Braune Blätter (brown leaves) because he liked the shape of the leaves, which developed into one of the company's most known product. After Joseph Emil Hachez's death in 1933, Hasse became the company's sole shareholder.

During the Second World War, the company's factory was almost completely destroyed, with the reconstruction beginning after the end of the war. Renovations were made financially possible by selling 50% of the company to Zertus (still known as Zuckerraffinerie Tangermünde at the time) in 1953, which had settled in Hamburg after the war and then started producing chocolate together with Hachez in Bremen. In 1987, Hasso Nauck (1951–2017), grandson of Otto Friedrich Hasse, sold the remaining family share of 50% to Zertus, which subsequently took over Hachez. In 1990, Nauck, who since 1987 was Head of Marketing for Milka at Jacobs Suchard AG (today Mondelēz International), joined the Hachez company as managing director together with one of his colleagues, Wolf Kropp-Büttner. The headquarters of Jacobs Suchard AG in Bremen was only a few meters away from the Hachez factory building in the Neustadt district. In 2000, Nauck took over the Hachez company as part of a management buyout together with Kropp-Büttner, where Nauck held 60 % of the shares and Kropp-Büttner the remaining 40 %.

In 2012, Nauck and Kropp-Büttner sold their shares to the Danish Toms Group, but initially remained employed as managing directors with contracts until the end of 2014. Nauck resigned from his post in January 2013, Kropp-Büttner resigned in September 2013. Both remained with the company in an advisory capacity until their contracts expired at the end of 2014. Hachez was unprofitable after the takeover and in December 2014, the company decided to cut jobs at its Bremen location. The packaging was also revised in 2014 to be "a more attractive first choice among consumers". The company's packaging activities were relocated to Poland at the end of 2014, with production continuing to take place in Bremen. In mid-2015, Hachez employed around 360 people in Germany. On 28 February 2018, it was announced that Toms would be giving up the Hachez factory in Bremen at the turn of the year 2019/20. Production has taken place in Nowa Sól in Poland since 2020. The closure also resulted in the resignation of managing director Christian Strasoldo. In September 2019, the city of Bremen secured a Pre-sale right for the company premises in the Bremer Neustadt district and plans emerged for the continued use of the area. As of 2019, the HACHEZ brand has been distributed by Hanseatisches Chocoladen Kontor GmbH & Co. KG, Bremen, as the successor company to Hachez. In August 2024, the factory site was sold to Überseeinsel GmbH.

Since the beginning of 2024, the distribution and marketing of the brand has also been handled by an external company. A remaining factory outlet, which sold broken chocolate, closed at the end of 2024. The operator explained the closure by stating that less broken chocolate was being produced due to improved equipment at the factory in Poland.

Hachez ran a permanent exhibition on chocolate under the name Chocoversum at the Meßberghof in Hamburg from 2011 to 2021. Since 2021, it has continued to operate as an independent chocolate museum without Hachez's involvement.

== Production ==
The cocoa mainly comes from South America. The flavour is extracted by using the hot-air currents that are in traditional roasting drums. When the cocoa is ground and rolled, it is an average diameter of 0.0010 to 0.0014 mm. The conching of the cocoa then takes place for up to 72 hours. Altogether, it takes over 100 hours to produce the products.

== Distribution ==
Hachez has distribution partners in the following countries:

- India
- Austria
- China
- Czech Republic
- Denmark
- Estonia
- Hong Kong
- Japan
- Korea
- Netherlands
- Norway
- Poland
- Russia
- South Africa
- Spain
- United Kingdom
- United States of America
