= Wolfgang Fuchs =

Wolfgang Fuchs may refer to:

- Wolfgang Heinrich Johannes Fuchs (1915–1997), German mathematician
- Wolfgang J. Fuchs (1945–2020), German author
