= Fuchs =

Fuchs (IPA: [fʊks]) is German and Yiddish (פֿוקס) for 'fox' and may refer to:

== People ==
- Fuchs (surname)

== Education ==
- Fuchs Mizrachi School, a Modern Orthodox Jewish college preparatory day school located in Beachwood, Ohio.

== Industry ==
- Fuchs Petrolub, the world's largest independent manufacturer of lubricants, and related speciality products.
- Fuchs Gruppe, spice company based in Germany
- Fuchs Systems Inc., a German manufacturer of equipment for making steel

== Medicine ==
- Fuchs' dystrophy, a slowly progressing corneal disease

== Military ==
- Transportpanzer Fuchs, a German armoured personnel carrier

== See also ==
- Fox (disambiguation)
- Fux
