= Karl Fuchs =

Karl Fuchs may refer to:

- Karl Fuchs (museum founder) (1776–1846), founder of the Kazan Zoo in 1806 and the Botanical Museum in Kazan
- Karl Fuchs (politician) (1920–1989), German politician, representative of the Christian Social Union of Bavaria
