= Fuchs Gruppe =

German spice company

DF World of Spices SE
- Native name: Fuchs Gruppe
- Type: SE (privately held)
- Industry: Food
- Founded: 1952; 74 years ago
- Founder: Dieter Fuchs
- Headquarters: Dissen, Germany
- Area served: Worldwide
- Key people: Nils Meyer-Pries (CEO), Marco Winkhold (CFO)
- Products: Spices, herbs, seasonings, culinary products
- Revenue: €637 million (2025)
- Owner: Dieter Fuchs Foundation (90%) family foundation (10%)
- Number of employees: approx. 3,100
- Website: fuchsgruppe.com/en

The Fuchs Gruppe (legally DF World of Spices SE, or simply Fuchs) is a German multinational spice company based in Dissen am Teutoburger Wald. It produces spices, herbs, technological compounds and culinary products for food retail, the food industry and the food service sector. With brands such as Fuchs, Ostmann, Bamboo Garden and Fuego, it is the market leader for spices in Germany.

The group is 90% owned by the non-profit Dieter Fuchs Foundation, with the remaining 10% held by a family foundation.

== History ==
=== Founding and early years ===
Dieter Fuchs founded the company in Dissen in 1952. He initially delivered salt and pepper in bags directly to households by bicycle. In the late 1950s, he switched to supplying grocery stores. In 1963, the company introduced the "Dekorbox", a plastic container with an integrated shaker and dosing mechanism, following the trend towards selling spices in tins and jars instead of bags. In 1968, Dieter Fuchs divided the company into two divisions for retail and industrial customers, a structure that essentially remains in place. From 1970, the company also supplied supermarkets with spice racks made in its own joinery. Hundreds of field staff check stock levels and best-before dates on the shelves in the stores.

According to the company, it expanded its vertical integration from the 1970s onwards to reduce its dependence on intermediaries. In 1973, it founded the pepper purchasing company Tropoc (Tropoc Produtos Tropicais de Castanhal) in Brazil, its first company abroad. In 1977, it opened its first international sales location, Épices Fuchs, in France.

=== Acquisitions ===
In 1990, Fuchs acquired the American competitor Baltimore Spice Company, later renamed Fuchs North America, which became its first industrial site abroad. During the 1990s, it expanded its business in Brazil and entered the Chinese market, where it founded Fuchs China Foodstuffs in 1999. In 2001, it established Fuchs Condimente Romania.

In 1998, Fuchs acquired its competitor Ostmann Gewürze, which was then owned by an Australian group. Ostmann had lost so much revenue under a previous owner that the takeover fell below the thresholds for merger control and was not reviewed by the competition authorities. Fuchs closed the Ostmann production site in Bielefeld and continued Ostmann as a separate brand. In 2000, it took over the spice business of Bestfoods with the Ubena brand and closed the Ubena site in Bremen. The Wagner spice brand followed in 2003.

In 2006, Fuchs entered the delicatessen market by acquiring a majority stake in Theodor Kattus from the Zertus group, together with the brands Kattus, Bamboo Garden and Fuego. The group also created the Escoffier brand for products such as stocks and sauces. In 2017, Fuchs acquired the British company Bart Ingredients. In the same year, it established a pepper purchasing company in Cambodia, followed by a subsidiary in Malaysia in 2024.

=== Competition law proceedings ===
In 2002, the German Federal Cartel Office (Bundeskartellamt) described Fuchs as the largest spice supplier in Europe. It found that the company held a dominant position in the German market for dried spices and herbs in household-size packages, with a market share of about 75%. Fuchs had concluded supply contracts containing exclusivity clauses with independent food retailers and offered contributions to advertising costs on condition that its smaller competitor Hartkorn was delisted. The authority prohibited Fuchs from unfairly hindering Hartkorn. In 2006, it fined the Fuchs subsidiary Teuto Gewürzvertrieb €250,000 for at least five violations of the prohibition by its sales representatives.

=== Succession and ownership ===
In 2013, at the age of 85, Dieter Fuchs withdrew from operational management but remained in an advisory role. In 2015, the chief financial officer Nils Meyer-Pries became head of the management board. In 2016, Dieter Fuchs transferred the majority of his shares to the non-profit Dieter Fuchs Foundation. According to the company, this was intended to secure the long-term independence of the group. At the same time, the Finnish Paulig Group, which had held a minority stake of 25.01% since 2000, was granted additional rights that amounted to joint control under competition law. Dieter Fuchs formally left the management in October 2018 and died in March 2019 at the age of 90. His remaining shares then also passed to foundations.

In 2023, the majority shareholders bought back the minority stake held by Paulig, with economic effect from 1 January 2023. In 2025, the parent company was converted into a European company (SE).

== Corporate structure ==
The holding company of the group is DF World of Spices SE. The operating business is divided into a retail and an industrial division. The largest indirect shareholder is the non-profit Dieter Fuchs Foundation, which holds 90% of the shares and supports projects in science, education, art and culture. The foundation's board of trustees is chaired by Christian Wulff, former Minister-President of Lower Saxony and former President of Germany. The remaining shares are held by a family foundation.

The group is managed by an executive board. As of 2026, it is chaired by Nils Meyer-Pries, with Marco Winkhold as chief financial officer. Local managing directors are responsible for the main national markets, including Germany, Brazil, China, the United Kingdom, Romania and the United States.

Fuchs operates its own companies in countries of origin such as Brazil, China and Cambodia. These buy raw materials such as paprika and pepper directly from producers and carry out initial quality checks. Further processing takes place in the country of origin or at the group's own plants, which clean, refine and grind the spices.

In 2025, revenue fell by 3.6% to €637 million, which the company attributed to planned one-off effects. The retail business accounted for 55% of revenue. With 49% of revenue, Germany remained the largest single market. The group employs around 3,100 people at 20 locations.

== Business operations ==
=== Retail ===
In retail, Fuchs pursues a multi-brand strategy aimed at different consumer groups. In Germany, its core brands are Fuchs and Ostmann. It also produces private label products for food retailers. Facing new competition from Nestlé and Kraft Heinz, the group began to separate the two core brands more clearly in 2023. In the food service sector, it is represented by brands such as Fuchs Professional and Ubena.

Fuchs is the original brand of the group and is known for its colorful spice containers. Since the brand separation, it has been positioned as a premium brand and in 2025 was the smaller of the two core brands. Ostmann goes back to a spice factory founded in Bielefeld in 1902 by the druggist Karl Ostmann. The group positions it as a basic brand for everyday cooking. In 2025, Ostmann accounted for 27% of the German retail spice market.

Bamboo Garden is a brand for Asian food products. The trademark was filed in 1983 by the company Skandinavien- und Süd-Import from Maisach. In 2003, the rights passed to the Zertus group, which had owned Theodor Kattus since 1999. Bamboo Garden came to Fuchs with Theodor Kattus in 2006 and, like the Kattus and Fuego brands, is managed by this subsidiary. Other brands of the group include Wagner and Escoffier in Germany, Bart in the United Kingdom and Cosmin in Romania.

=== Industry ===
The industrial division supplies food manufacturers with refined spices and herbs, spice blends, compounds and flavor concepts. Its main customers are the snack, meat and dairy industries, as well as producers of fish, convenience food and bakery products. In 2024, the division accounted for 45.3% of revenue.

== Pesticide residues ==
In 2024, the German consumer magazine Öko-Test tested 30 paprika powders for pesticide residues and rated 11 of them as "insufficient" (ungenügend), mainly because of multiple residues and excessive levels of glufosinate. These included the paprika powder of the Ostmann brand. In 2026, the magazine found residues of nine and eight pesticides respectively in the herbes de Provence blends of the Fuchs and Ostmann brands and rated both as "poor" (mangelhaft).
