= Bruce Fuchs =

American immunologist

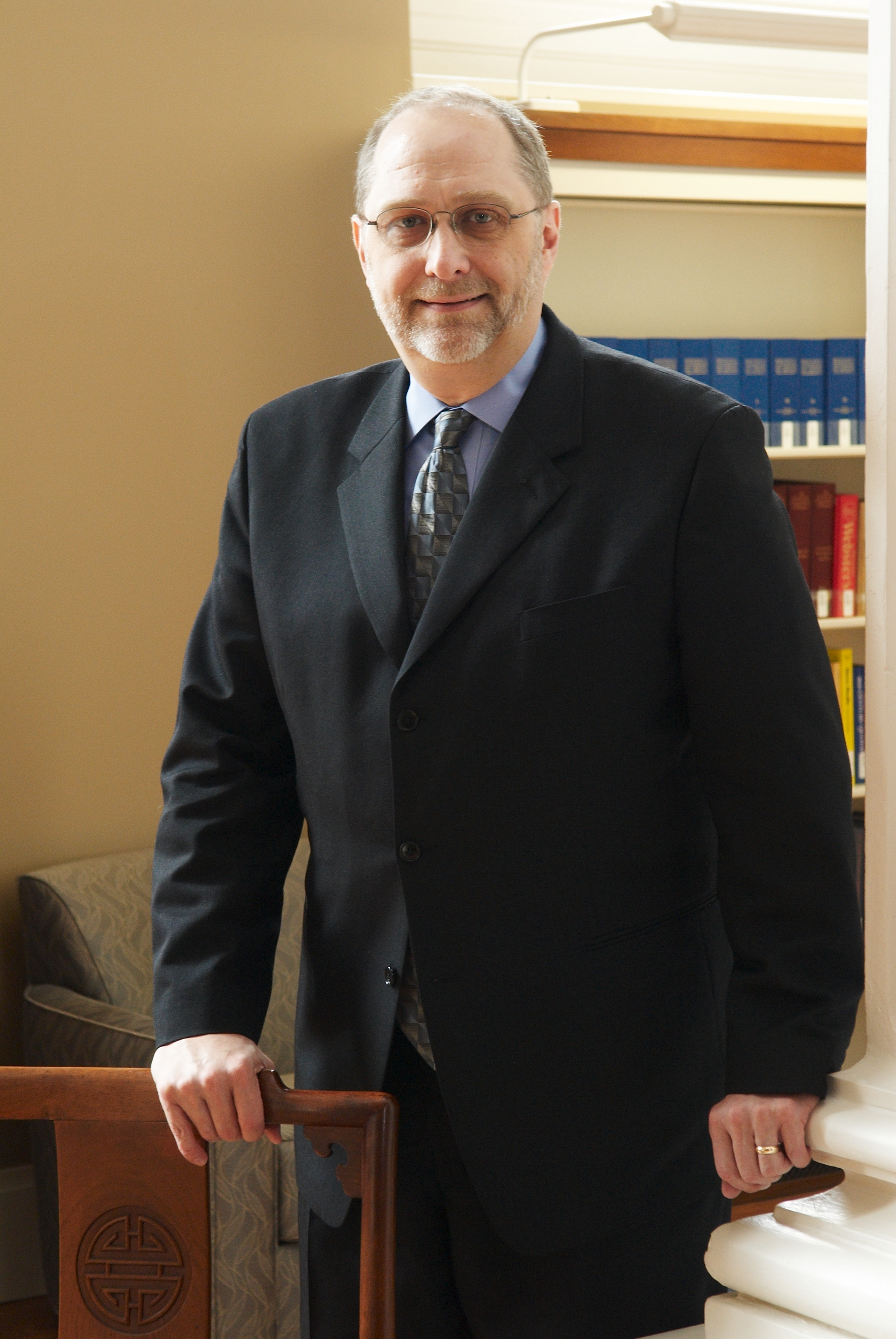
Fuchs in 2007.

Bruce A. Fuchs is an American immunologist and health science administrator. He was the director of the Office of Science Education (OSE) at the National Institutes of Health. On October 1, 2013, OSE ceased operations and Fuchs was reassigned. He works as a health science administrator in the Office of Research Infrastructure Programs and oversees programs pertaining to career development. He is the primary contact for F30/F31 and SERCA K01 applications and the Diversity and Re-Entry Supplements. Fuchs' expertise is in immunology and brain immune interactions.

== Selected publications ==
- Fuchs, Bruce A.; Albright, Julia W.; Albright, Joseph F. (1988). "β-Adrenergic receptors on murine lymphocytes: Density varies with cell maturity and lymphocyte subtype and is decreased after antigen administration". Cellular Immunology. 114 (2): 231–245. doi:10.1016/0008-8749(88)90318-8. PMID 2839301.
- Fuchs, Bruce A.; Campbell, Kerry S.; Munson, Albert E. (1988). "Norepinephrine and serotonin content of the murine spleen: Its relationship to lymphocyte β-adrenergic receptor density and the humoral immune response in vivo and in vitro". Cellular Immunology. 117 (2): 339–351. doi:10.1016/0008-8749(88)90123-2. PMID 2848630.
- Pruett, S. B.; Fuchs, B. A. (1993-07-01). "Morphine induces apoptosis in murine thymocytes in vivo but not in vitro: involvement of both opiate and glucocorticoid receptors". Journal of Pharmacology and Experimental Therapeutics. 266 (1): 417–423. doi:10.1016/S0022-3565(25)38348-5. ISSN 0022-3565. PMID 8392561.
- Fuchs, B. A.; Freier, D. O. (1994-09-01). "A mechanism of action for morphine-induced immunosuppression: corticosterone mediates morphine-induced suppression of natural killer cell activity". Journal of Pharmacology and Experimental Therapeutics. 270 (3): 1127–1133. doi:10.1016/S0022-3565(25)22517-4. ISSN 0022-3565. PMID 7932161.
- Street, N. E.; Fuchs, B. A.; Kasprowicz, D. J.; Ramer-Quinn, D. S.; Baker, R. A.; Sanders, V. M. (1997-05-01). "Differential expression of the beta2-adrenergic receptor by Th1 and Th2 clones: implications for cytokine production and B cell help". The Journal of Immunology. 158 (9): 4200–4210. doi:10.4049/jimmunol.158.9.4200. ISSN 0022-1767. PMID 9126981. S2CID 32439156.
- Bybee, Rodger W.; Fuchs, Bruce (2006). "Preparing the 21st century workforce: A new reform in science and technology education". Journal of Research in Science Teaching. 43 (4): 349–352. Bibcode:2006JRScT..43..349B. doi:10.1002/tea.20147. ISSN 0022-4308.
