= Storkau, Stendal =

Storkau
- Stadtteil of Tangermünde
- Interactive map of Storkau
- Location within Germany Location within Saxony-Anhalt
- Coordinates: 52°37′N 12°0′E
- Country: Germany
- State: Saxony-Anhalt
- District: Stendal
- Town: Tangermünde

Area
  - Total: 9.59 km^{2} (3.70 sq mi)
- Elevation: 28 m (92 ft)

Population (2006-12-31)
  - Total: 164
  - Density: 17.1/km^{2} (44.3/sq mi)
- Time zone: UTC+01:00 (CET)
  - Summer (DST): UTC+02:00 (CEST)
- Postal codes: 39590
- Dialling codes: 039321
- Vehicle registration: SDL

Storkau is a village and a former municipality in the district of Stendal, in Saxony-Anhalt, Germany. Since 1 January 2010, it is part of the town Tangermünde.
