= Gerhardshofen =

- Municipality
- Coat of arms

- Location of Gerhardshofen within Neustadt a.d.Aisch-Bad Windsheim district
- Interactive map of Gerhardshofen
- Location within Germany Location within Bavaria
- Coordinates: 49°37′N 10°41′E
- Country: Germany
- State: Bavaria
- Admin. region: Mittelfranken
- District: Neustadt a.d.Aisch-Bad Windsheim
- Municipal assoc.: Uehlfeld
- Subdivisions: 14 Ortsteile

Government
  - Mayor (2020–26): Jürgen Mönius

Area
  - Total: 27.20 km^{2} (10.50 sq mi)
- Elevation: 288 m (945 ft)

Population (2025-12-31)
  - Total: 2,508
  - Density: 92.21/km^{2} (238.8/sq mi)
- Time zone: UTC+01:00 (CET)
  - Summer (DST): UTC+02:00 (CEST)
- Postal codes: 91466
- Dialling codes: 09163
- Vehicle registration: NEA
- Website: www.gerhardshofen.de

Gerhardshofen is a municipality in the district of Neustadt (Aisch)-Bad Windsheim in the administrative region of Middle Franconia in northern Bavaria in Germany.

== Geography ==
Gerhardshofen is located in the valley of the Aisch. The neighbouring municipalities are (from the north in clockwise direction): Dachsbach, Weisendorf, Oberreichenbach, Emskirchen, Diespeck and Gutenstetten. The municipality has 13 boroughs: Altenbuch, Birnbaum, Eckenhof, Emelsdorf, Forst, Göttelhöf, Kästel, Kleehof, Linden, Rappoldshofen, Sintmannsbuch, Vahlenmühle and Willmersbach.

== History ==
The village owes its foundation to the Franconian colonisation of the 9th century and thus is a foundation of the Carolingian dynasty.

The first documented notice of Gerhardshofen is from 1235. There was mentioned a Heinrich Neze von Gerhardshofen in two documents of the Burgraves of Nuremberg. The first non aristocratic inhabitant ever mentioned was Conrad Stahel in 1304.

In the First Margrave War (1449–1450) Nuremberg troops looted 118 cows and 17 horses from Gerhardshofen and Dachsbach.

In 1553 there existed 53 properties which belonged to the manorialism Brunn, the Margraves' bailiff offices of Dachsbach and Neustadt an der Aisch and to the reeves offices of Birkenfeld and Münchsteinach. In the Thirty Years' War nearly all houses were destroyed, also the church was burnt out. But in 1697 there were already 44 farmsteads resettled. Their number increased to 57 in the year 1792.

The village belonged to the blood court of Dachsbach, but the manoralism Brunn did justice on their properties by their own rights.

Probably there was a church destroyed by 1450. By 1471 there was laid a foundation stone for a new church. The inauguration of it was in 1481. The great structural damages of the Thirty Years' War were not repaired until the end of the 17th century. The renovation of 1795 matched a new construction. It was done in the baroque style of the Margraves. After a recent renovation the Lord's house is a gem in the Aischgrund.

== Culture ==
=== Music ===
- Man choral society "Eintracht" Gerhardshofen

=== Periodic Events ===
- Kirchweih, each next to last Sunday in August.
- Annual alternating village fête and trade show.

== Economics and Infrastructure ==
Federal highway B 470 is directed from north to south through the community area.

From 12 July 1904 until 30 May 1976 there was a railway, the Neustadt (Aisch)–Demantsfürth-Uehlfeld railway called Aischtalbahn, which led to the Nuremberg–Würzburg railway. It was broken down and since then only buses connect Dachsbach with the surrounding area. The lines belong to the pay scale area of the Verkehrsverbund Großraum Nürnberg.
