= Dachsbach =

- Municipality
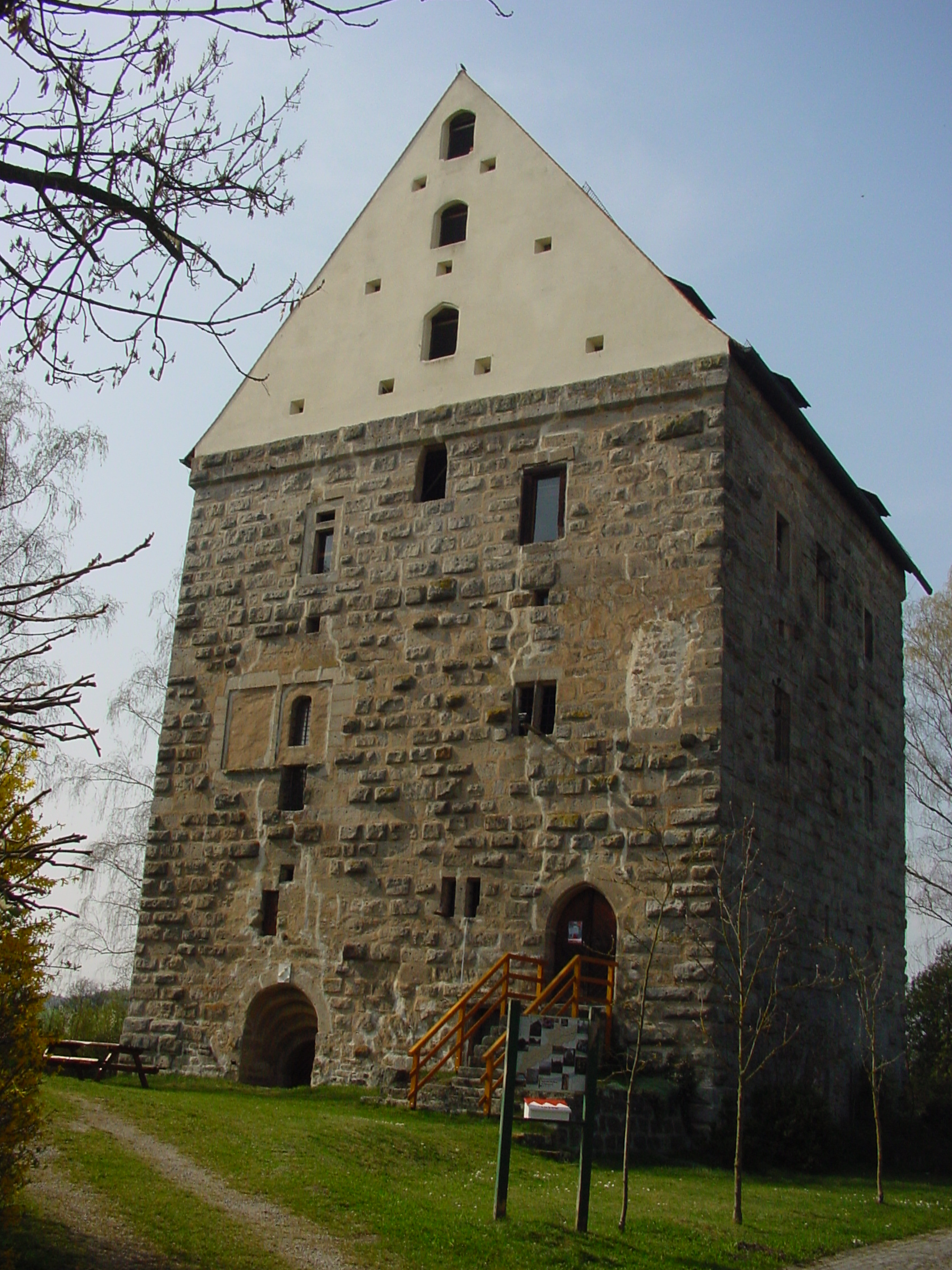
- Tower of the former Dachsbach Castle

- Coat of arms

- Location of Dachsbach within Neustadt a.d.Aisch-Bad Windsheim district
- Interactive map of Dachsbach
- Location within Germany Location within Bavaria
- Coordinates: 49°38′N 10°42′E
- Country: Germany
- State: Bavaria
- Admin. region: Mittelfranken
- District: Neustadt a.d.Aisch-Bad Windsheim
- Municipal assoc.: Uehlfeld
- Subdivisions: 5 Ortsteile

Government
  - Mayor (2020–26): Peter Kaltenhäuser

Area
  - Total: 20.58 km^{2} (7.95 sq mi)
- Elevation: 280 m (920 ft)

Population (2025-12-31)
  - Total: 1,815
  - Density: 88.19/km^{2} (228.4/sq mi)
- Time zone: UTC+01:00 (CET)
  - Summer (DST): UTC+02:00 (CEST)
- Postal codes: 91462
- Dialling codes: 09163
- Vehicle registration: NEA
- Website: www.dachsbach.de

Dachsbach is a market town and municipality in the district of Neustadt (Aisch)-Bad Windsheim, in the administrative region of Middle Franconia in northern Bavaria in Germany.

== Geography ==
Dachsbach is located in the valley of the Aisch. The borough Rauschenberg is on the southern hills of the Steigerwald. The neighbouring municipalities are (from the north in clockwise direction): Uehlfeld, Weisendorf, Gerhardshofen and Gutenstetten. The municipality has five boroughs: Arnshöchstädt, Traishöchstädt, Göttelbrunn, Oberhöchstädt and Rauschenberg with Ziegelhütte.

== History ==
The first documented notice of Dachsbach is from 1129 - a Knight Heinrich von Dachsbach sold one of his properties to the monastery St. Michael in Bamberg. In 1132 there was a witness with name Knight Albrecht von Dachsbach for the foundation of the monastery Heilsbronn. From 1298 until 1347 there was a Knight Konrad von Dachsbach reeve of the monastery of Münchsteinach. On April 14, 1280 the castle was pledged to the burgraves of Nuremberg, who made an official residence of it and built up Dachsbach as a bastion against the Cathedral Foundation Bamberg. Until 1797 the official residence remained in Dachsbach. At this time Neustadt an der Aisch became the central residence in the valley of the Aisch. Until this time the blood court for up to 41 surrounding areas was localized in the bailiff's office. The gallows at Galgenberg (i.e. Gallows Hill) were broken down in 1814.

Several wars have left their marks in Dachsbach. In the First Margrave War (1449–1450) and the Second Margrave War (1552–1555) troops from Nuremberg, in the Peasants' War the rebellious peasants occupied and raided Dachsbach. On November 12, 1553 Albrecht Alcibiades burned down his own castle to "learn the Nuremberg moneybags the bourning". In the Thirty Years' War (August 10, 1634) troops from Forchheim destroyed Dachsbach nearly complete. They only left the church, the tithe barn and six houses. At the beginning of the Thirty Years' War the mint of the margrave in Dachsbach manufactured "Bad Thaler" (worth 120 Kreutzer), which had the size of full-fledged Thaler, but were made of low-grade silver with a high copper fraction.

The end of the bailiff-time in Dachsbach was 1797. At this time the bailiff Herrgott (i.e. God) resided in Dachsbach. To him the proverb "living like God in Dachsbach" and the naming "God's heads" for the citizens of Dachsbach are traced back. In August 1798 he interrogated a custodian and initiated the smashing of the "Big Franconian Thieves and Robber Gang". But his end was not very "God-like": He got into custody in Bamberg in 1806 for breach of duty. Since then Dachsbach passed a contemplative existence and can document its partly outstanding regional importance only with its cultural monuments.

== Mayor ==
The current mayor is Peter Kaltenhäuser, elected in March 2020. He replaced Hans-Jürgen Regus, mayor since 2011 and re-elected in 2014. Regus was the successor of Walter Neudecker.

== Cultural monuments ==
- Tower House of the Water Castle
- Old Bailiff Office
- Round Bastion
- Church of Our Lady
- Old and New Castle Rauschenberg
- Old Tavern Oberhöchstädt

== Ecclesiastic ==
- Protestant Church Community - Church Choir Dachsbach
- Protestant Rural Youth Association Dachsbach
- Protestant Church Community Oberhöchstädt
- Protestant Rural Youth Association Oberhöchstädt

== Theatre ==
- Dachsbacher Burgtheater e.V.

== Culinary specialties ==
Carps of the valley of the Aisch in the local gastronomy.

Pretzels from the Erbel bakery.

== Economy and infrastructure ==
Federal highway B 470 is directed from north-east to south-west through the community area.

From 12 July 1904, until 30 May 1976, there was a railway from Neustadt (Aisch) to Demantsfürth-Uehlfeld called Aischtalbahn which led to the railway Nuremberg Würzburg. It was broken down and since then only busses connect Dachsbach with the surrounding areas. The lines belong to the pay scale area of VGN.

== Personalities ==
- Jörg Graff (1480-1542), was a German Landsknecht-poet and cantastoria-singer

== Literature ==
- In Goethe „Götz von Berlichingen" in the first act Götz calls „Geh auf den Weg nach Dachsbach!“ (i.e. „Move on the way to Dachsbach!“), which is roughly on the way from Jagsthausen to Bamberg.
