= House of Seckendorff =

Seckendorff
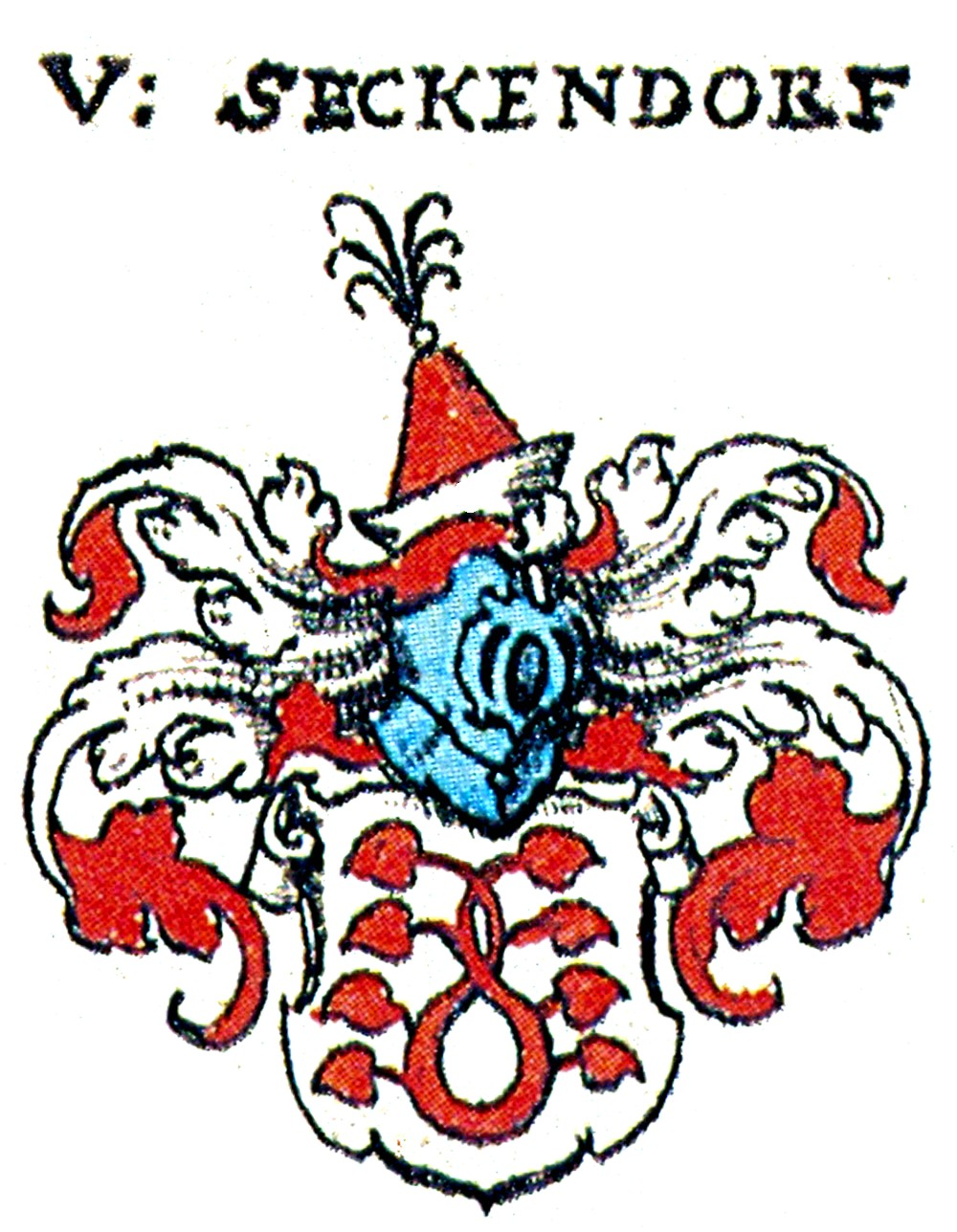
- Coat of Arms of the Seckendorff family

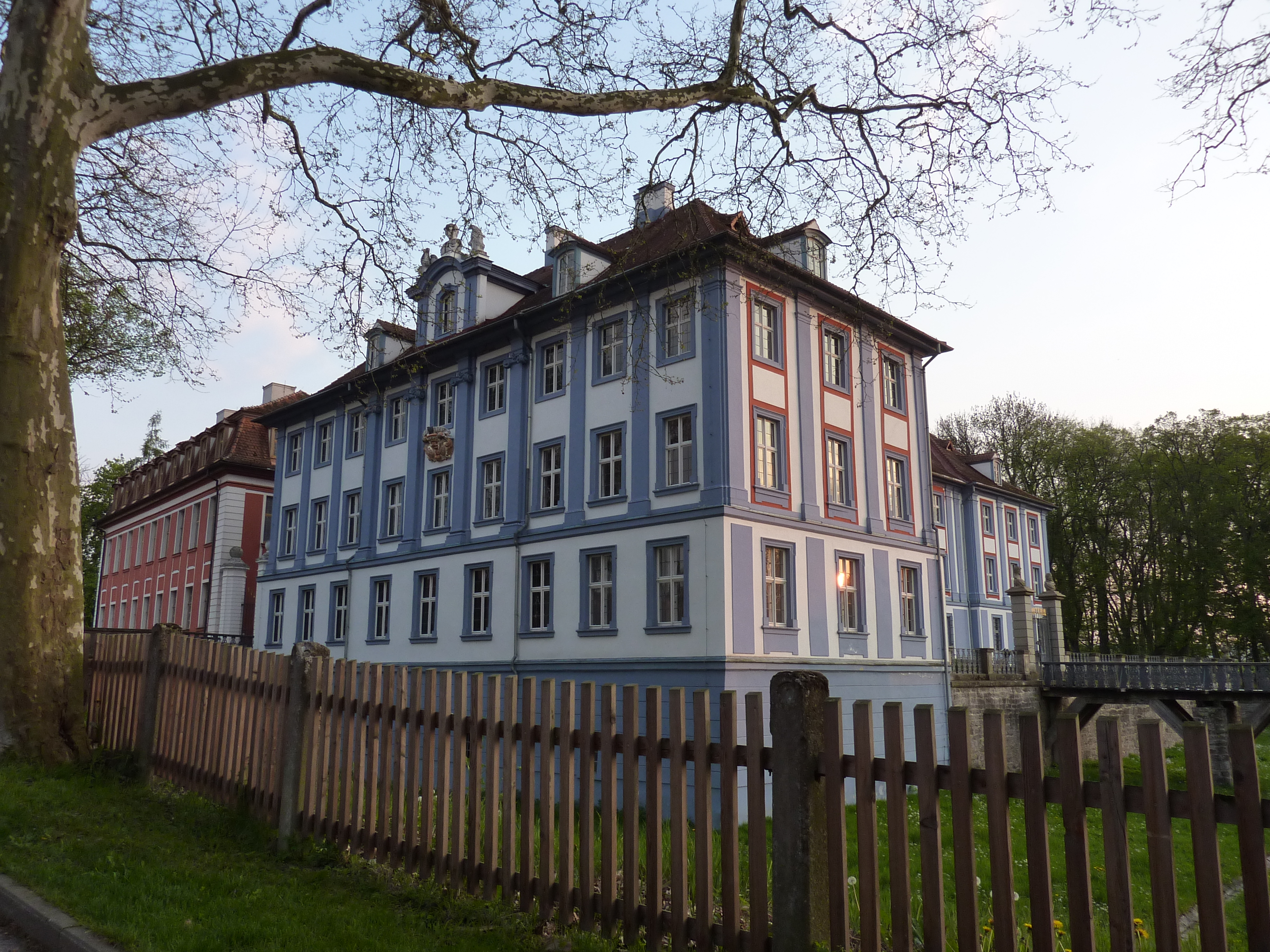
- Blaues und Rotes Schloss (Blue and Red Castles) Obernzenn
- Current region: Franconia
- Earlier spellings: Seckendorf
- Connected families: Guttenberg and Bibra
- Estates: Obernzenn, Blaues and Rotes Schloss

The House of Seckendorff (also: Seckendorf) is the name of an old and prolific Franconian noble family, part of the German nobility.

== History ==
The progenitor of the family was Heinrich von Seckendorff, first mentioned in a written document on 1 May 1254. According to historian Werner Wagenhöfer, the Seckendorff family is the most researched family of the lower nobility in Franconia along with the House of Guttenberg and the House of Bibra.

== Historical holdings ==
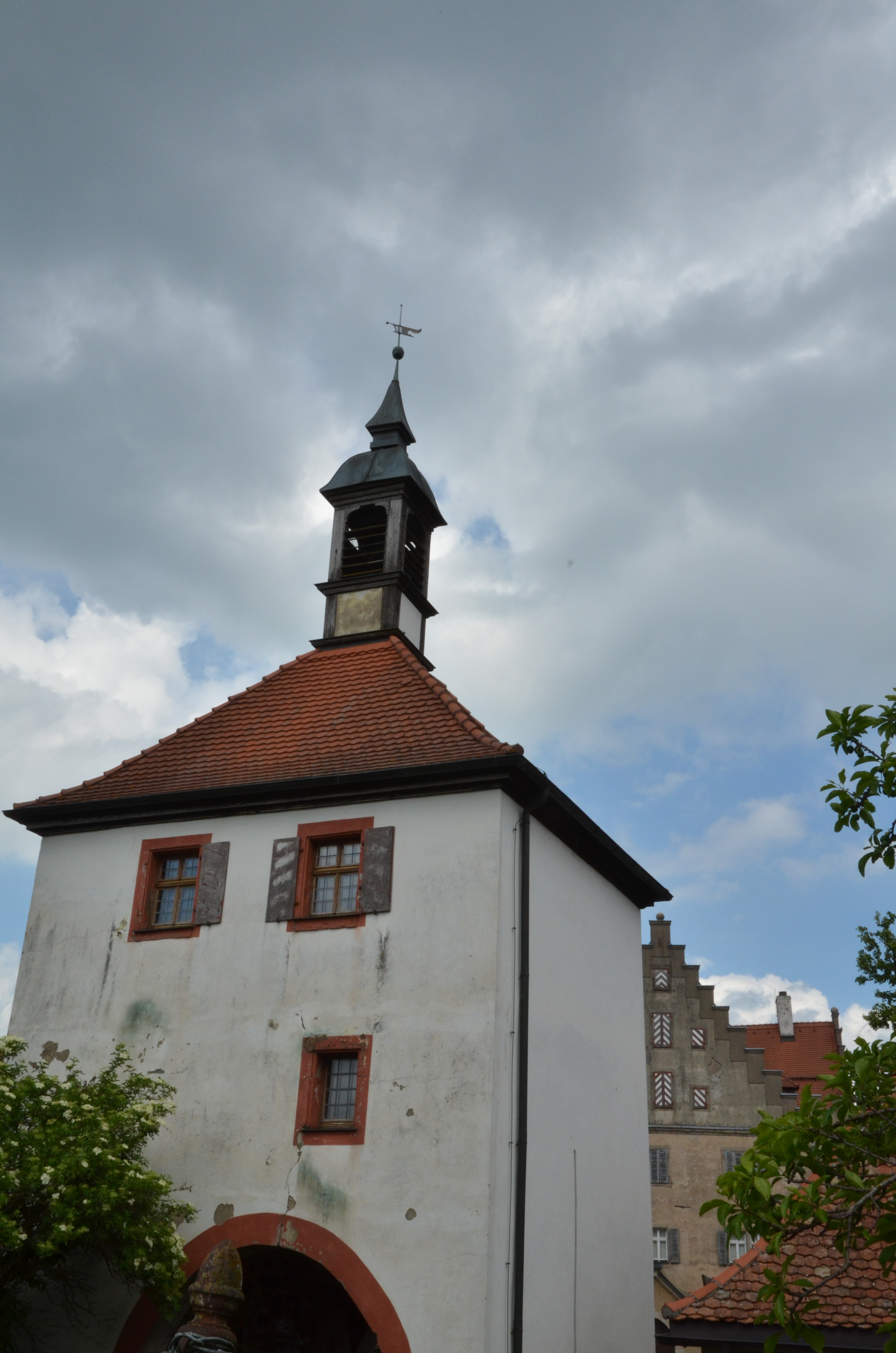
Schloss Unternzenn

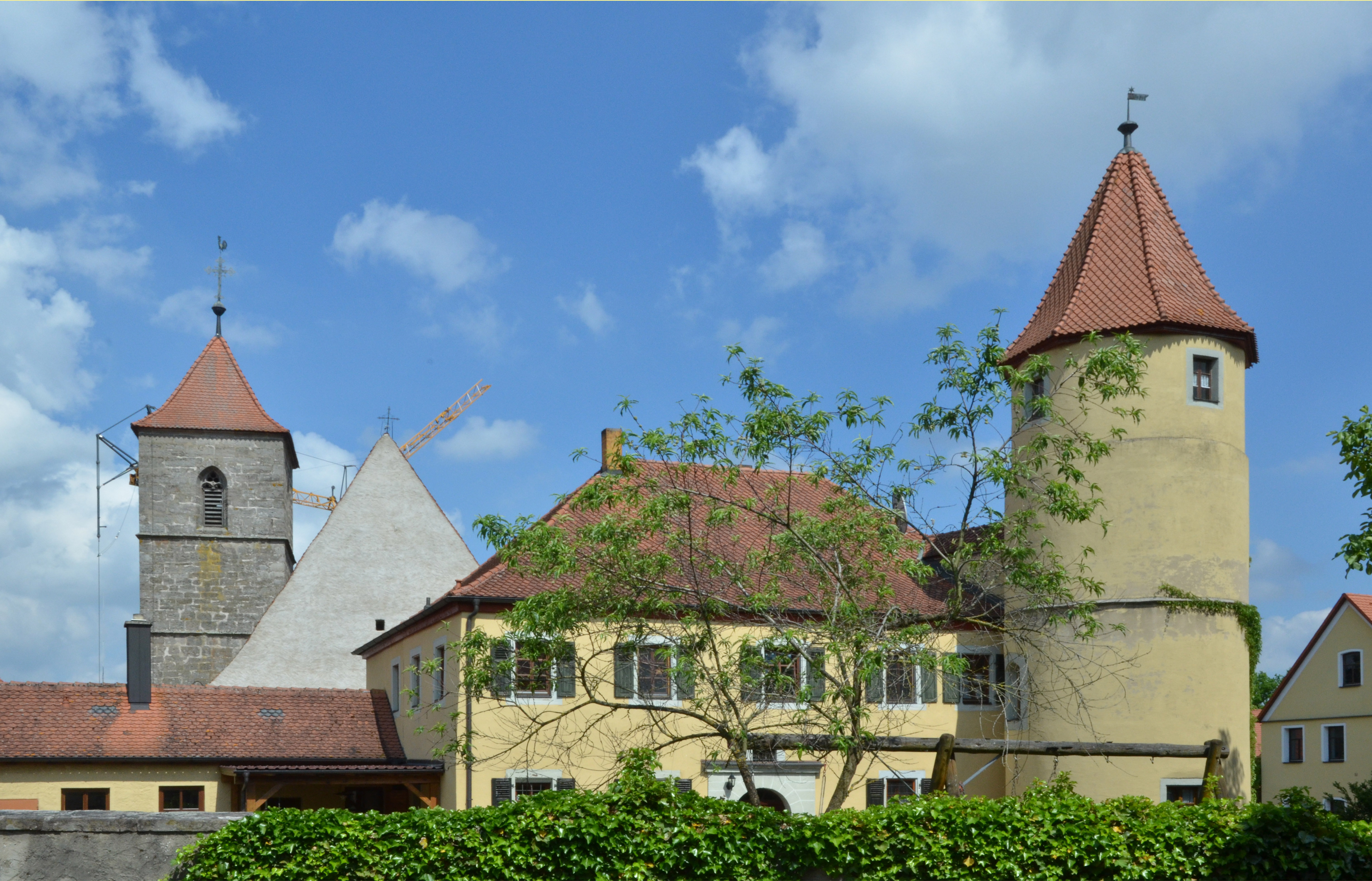
Schloss Unteraltenbernheim

- 1154 - ? Burg Seckendorf by Cadolzburg
- From 13th century to now Obernzenn, Blaues and Rotes Schloss
- to now: Schloss Unternzenn
- ? - ? Schloss Unteraltenbernheim
- 1317–1782 Castle and village Langenfeld (Mittelfranken) and Ullstadt
- 1347–1375 Oberndorf bei Möhrendorf
- Since 1361 Schnodsenbach
- 1361–1379 Monheim
- 1369–1518 (ca.) Neuendettelsau, about 1403 division between the Seckendorf and the Vestenberg family
- 1395–1500 (ca.) Rittergut Obersteinbach bei Neustadt/Aisch (mit Frankfurt, Langenfeld, Lachheim, Roßbach und Stübach)
- before 1417–1503 Burg Hiltpoltstein in the county of Forchheim
- 1422–1447 Rieterschloss in Kornburg
- 1444–1453 Burg Reicheneck by Happurg
- 1448–1452 Fürerschloss in Haimendorf
- beginning 1455 Rauschenberg, Bergtheim, Höchstadt, Taschendorf, Obertaschendorf.
- 1465–1722 the fief Buch by Weisendorf
- until 1479 Schloss Rezelsdorf by Weisendorf
- 1478–fifteen hundreds Festung Rothenberg by Schnaittach
- 1503–1528 Hüttenbach by Simmelsdorf
- beginning 1504 properties in Oberlindach by Weisendorf
- 1504–1570 Simmelsdorf
- 1527–1653 Obbach
- until 1531 Reichenschwand
- until 1558 Eismannsberg
- until 1600 Schloss Triesdorf
- ? - ? Altheim bei Dietersheim
- Mid 15th - Mid 17th Hallerndorf (Linie derer von Seckendorf zu Krotendorf, Schnodsenbach, Gugenheim, Hallerndorf und Rossbach)
- ? Gugenheim
- ? Krotendorf
- ? - ? Almoshof
- 1677–1945 Schloss Meuselwitz, Thüringen
- 1705 - today Schloss Ebneth (Owner: Isabelle Callens née von Seckendorff)
- ? - today Schloss Trautskirchen (Owner: Isabelle Callens née von Seckendorff)
- 1726 - today estate at Weingartsreuth (Owner: Freiherr von Seckendorff-von Witzleben)
- 1720–1727 Schloss Harrlach by Allersberg
- 1720–1774 Seckendorff-Eggloffsteinsche Freihaus in Kornburg
- 1757–1952 Schloss Unterleinleiter, Fränkische Schweiz
- 1840 -1945 Schloss Broock, Vorpommern-Greifswald
- 1858 - today Schloss Strössendorf

== Coat of arms ==
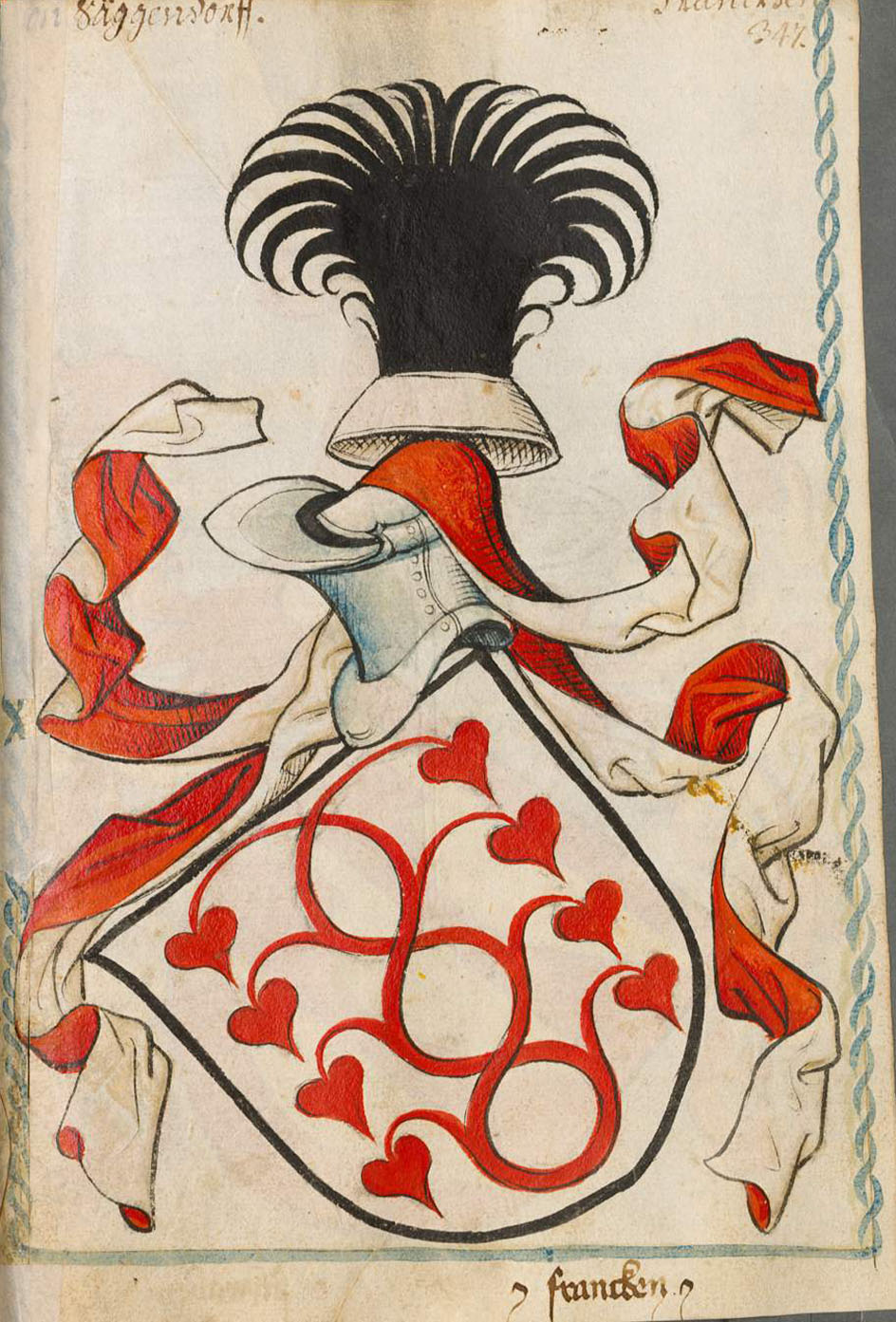
Scheiblersches Wappenbuch

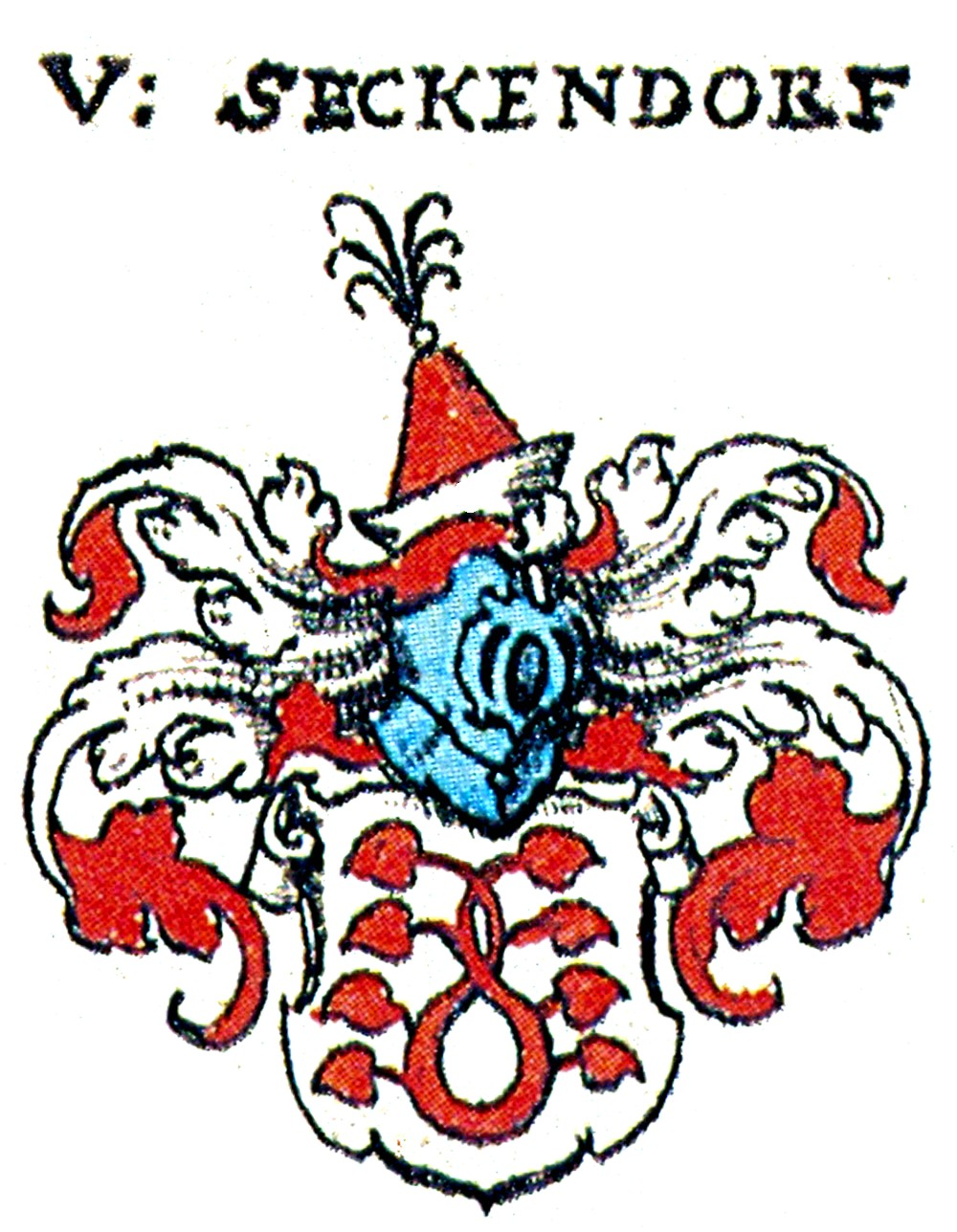
Siebmachers Wappenbuch

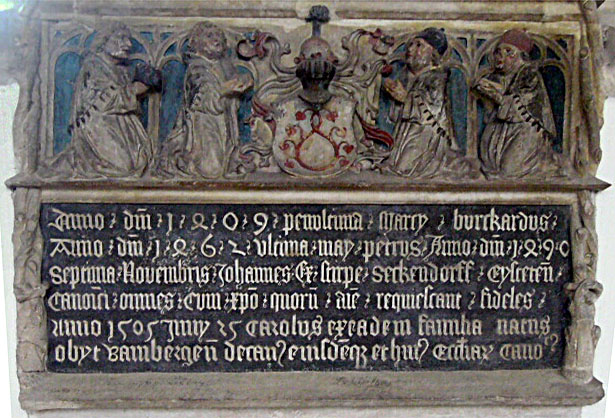
Epitaph with coat of arms, Eichstätter Dom

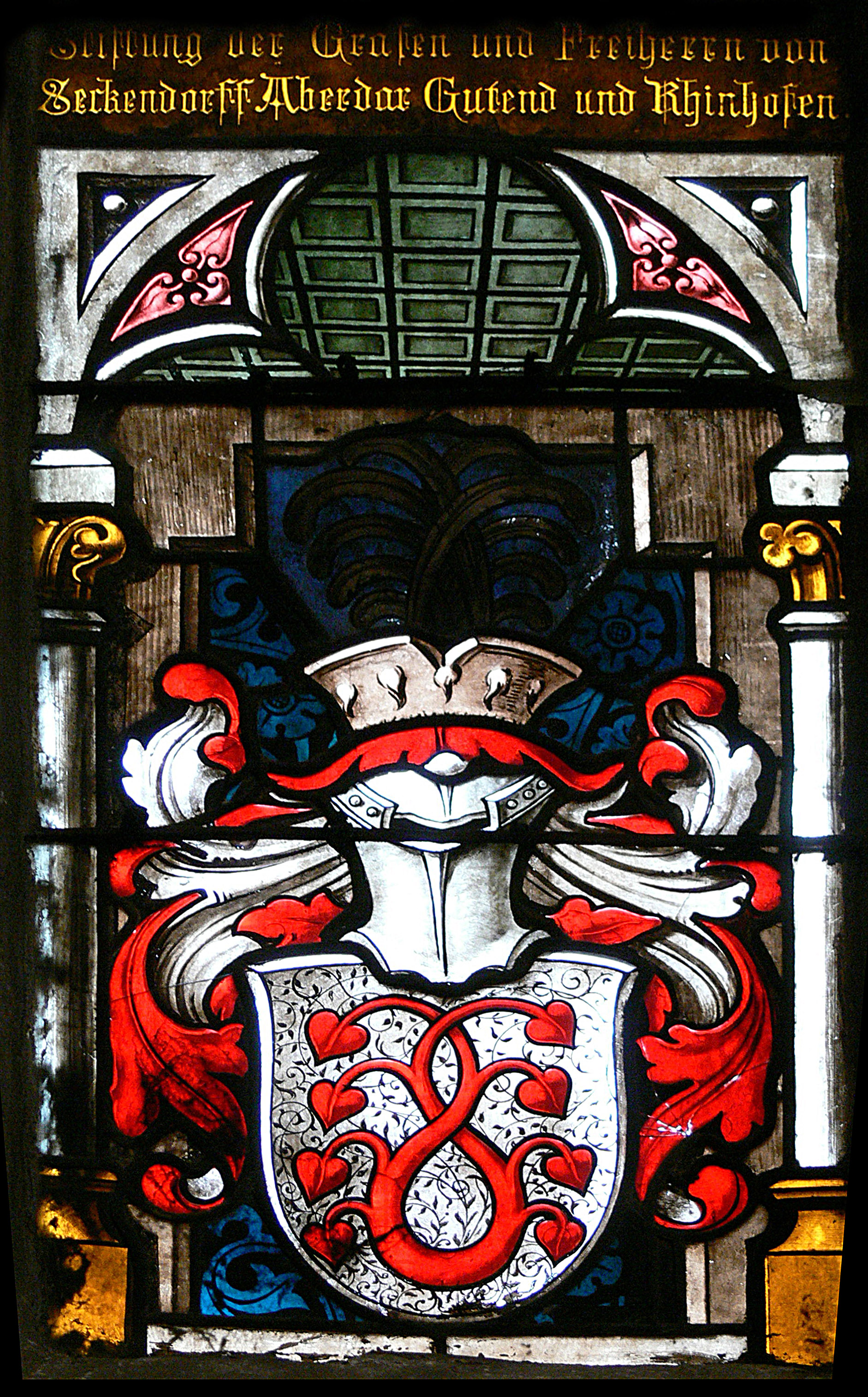
Stadtkirche Langenzenn

== Well known family members ==
- Burkard von Seckendorff-Jochsberg (died 1365)
- Hans von Seckendorff (um 1530), Amtmann in Ansbach
- Kaspar von Seckendorff (died 1595), Prince-Bishop of Eichstätt
- Veit Ludwig von Seckendorff (1626–1692), German Statesman
- Friedrich Heinrich von Seckendorff (1673–1763), Imperial field marshal
- Christoph Friedrich von Seckendorff-Aberdar (1679–1759), Diplomat and Brandenburg-Ansbach Minister
- Karl Siegmund von Seckendorff (1744–1785), German poet
- Johann Karl Christoph von Seckendorff (1747–1814), Wurttemberg State Minister
- Theresius von Seckendorf-Aberdar (auch: Seckendorff; 1758–1825), German biographer, novelist, Hispanist and lexicographer
- Christian Adolf von Seckendorff (1767–1833), German poet
- Friedrich Bernhard von Seckendorff (1772−1852), German politician
- Franz Karl Leopold von Seckendorf-Aberdar (1775–1809), German poet
- Gustav Anton von Seckendorff (1775–1823), German author, actor and declaimer
- Alfred von Seckendorff (1796–1876), German Administrative lawyer and writer
- Fanny Løvenskiold (1807-1873), born Francisca Veronika von Seckendorf-Aberdar, Norwegian court official and daughter of Johan Carl August Max von Seckendorf-Aberdar
- August Heinrich von Seckendorff (1807–1885), German statesman and lawyer
- Henriette von Seckendorff-Gutend (1819–1878), „Heilerin“, Mutter der Kranken und Schwermütigen, Gründerin der Villa Seckendorff in Stuttgart-Bad Cannstatt
- Oskar von Seckendorff (1840–1902), Prussian Major General
- Siegmund Karl Ludwig Friedrich Hermann von Seckendorf-Gudent; died in 1844 as a forestry student at Forstakademie Tharandt in a duel with his fellow student Otto Carl Werther
- Rudolf von Seckendorff (1844–1932), lawyer and president of the Reichsgericht (Imperial Court of Justice) (1905–1920)
- Arthur von Seckendorff-Gudent (1845–1886), Austrian forester, Swiss origin
- Gustav von Seckendorff (1848–1924), Prussian General of the Infantry
- Carl August Ludwig Wilhelm Freiherr von Seckendorff-Aberdar (1848-1948) Co-founder of scouting movement in Germany/Austria
- Albert von Seckendorff (1849–1921), German Vice-Admiral, diplomat, Marshall of the court of Prince Heinrichs von Preußen
- Adolf von Seckendorff (1857–1941), German General of the Infantry, Governor of Estland
- Götz von Seckendorff (1889–1914), German painter and sculptor
- Erich Erwin Heinrich August Veit Freiherr von Seckendorff (1897–1944) was a German general during World War II. He was a recipient of the Knight's Cross of the Iron Cross of Germany.
- Christa von Seckendorff (born 1970), German artist
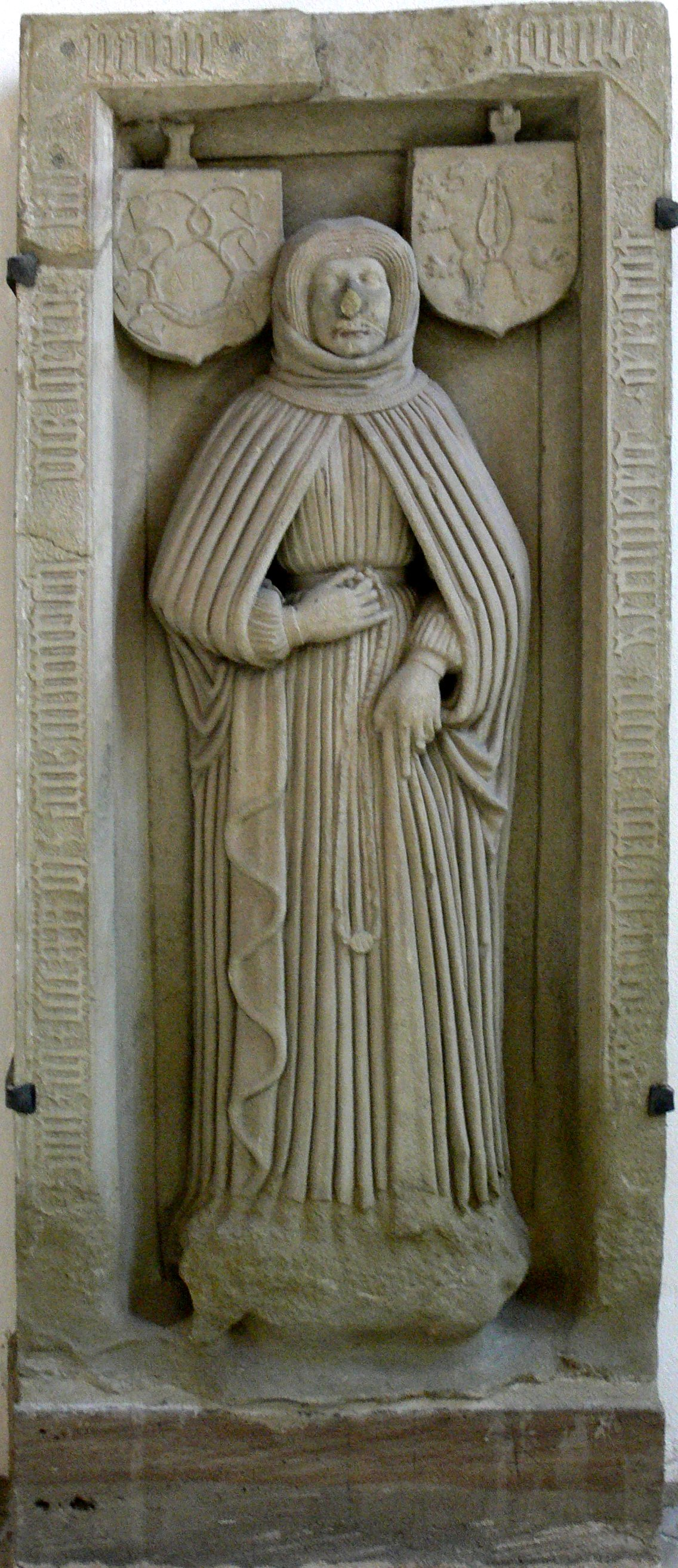
Grave of Margareta von Seckendorff (died 1436) in Münster Heilsbronn

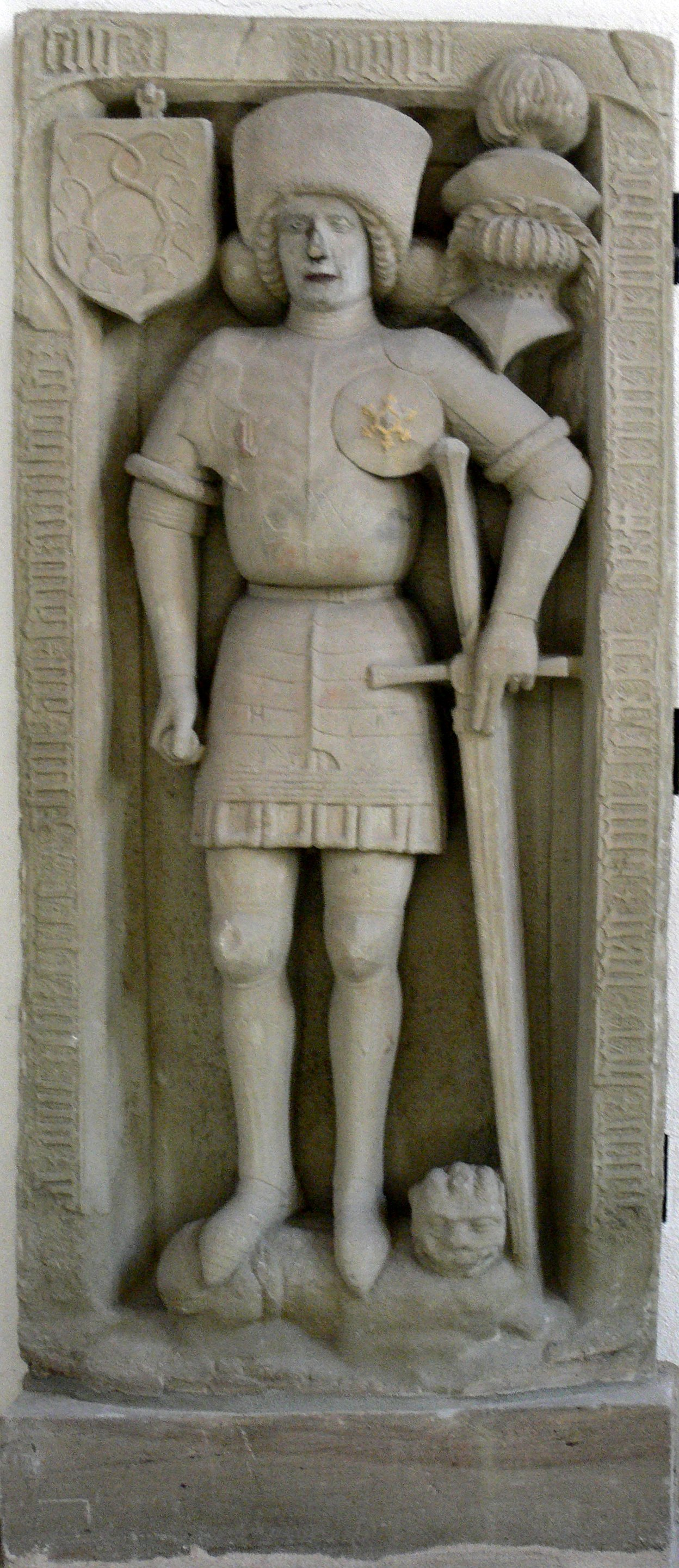
Grave of Georg von Seckendorff (died 1444) in Münster Heilsbronn

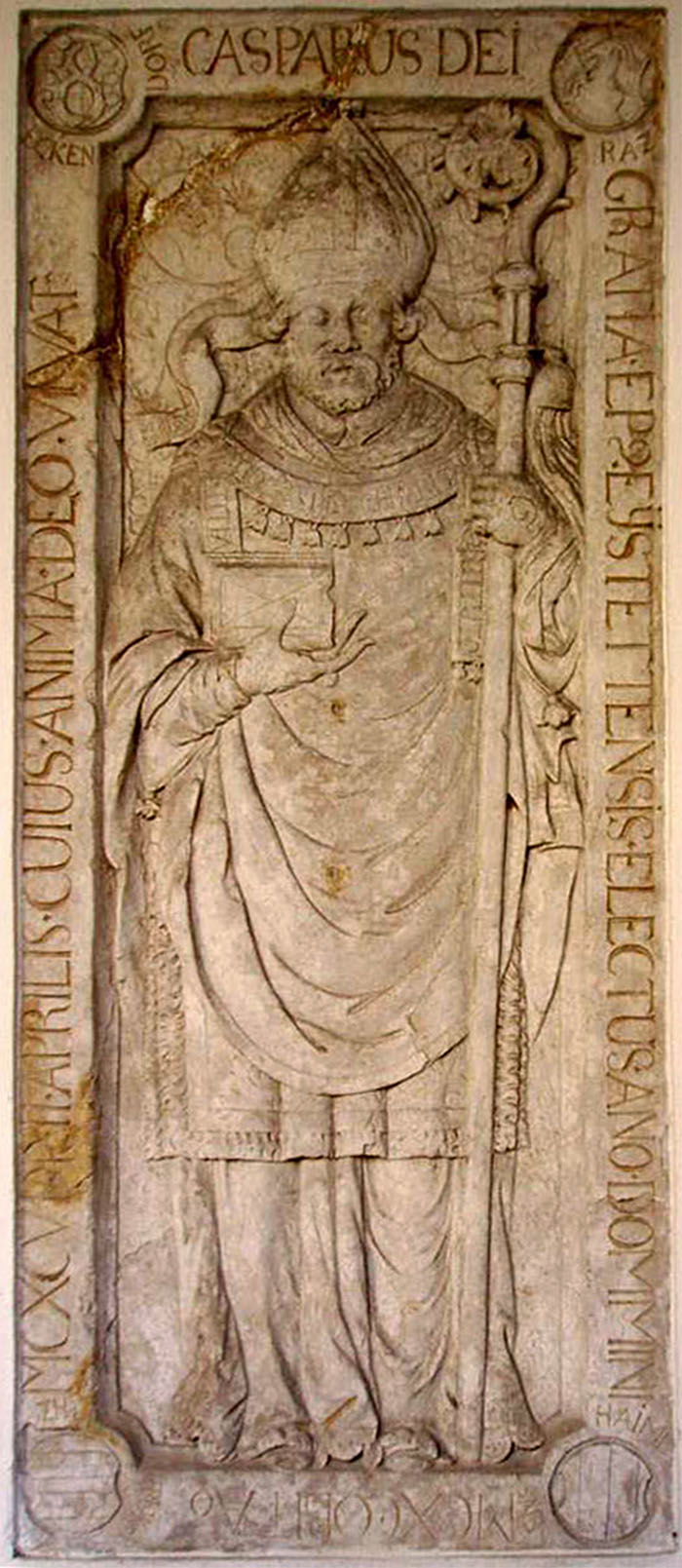
Grave plate of Eichstätter Prince Bishop Kaspar von Seckendorf im Kreuzgang des Eichstätter Domes

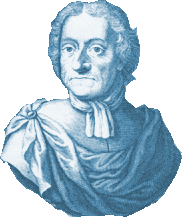
Veit Ludwig von Seckendorff

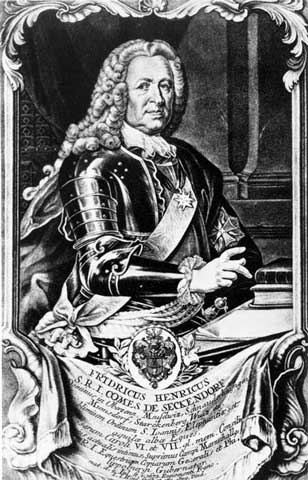
Friedrich Heinrich von Seckendorff

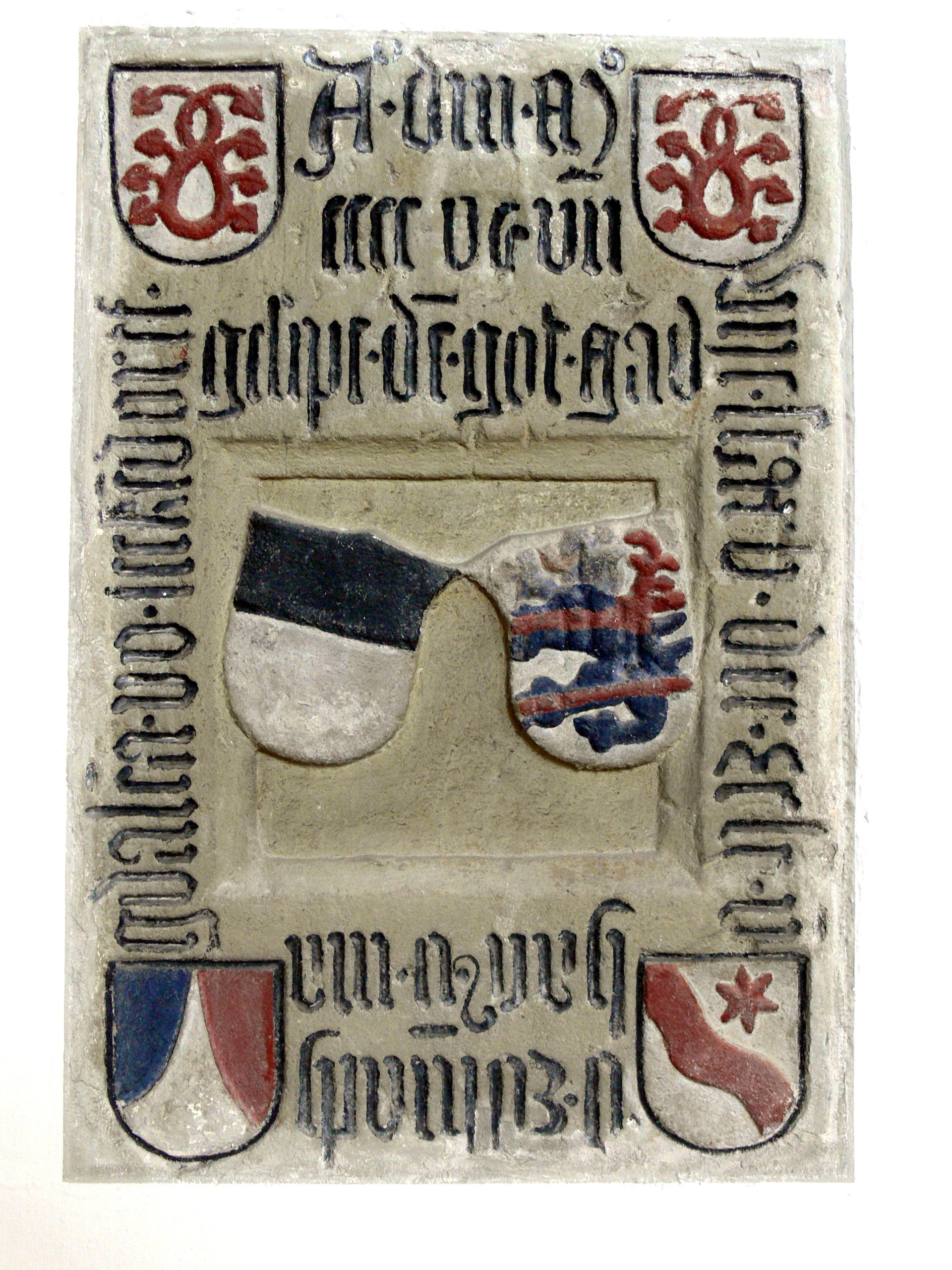
Epitaph in St. Jakob in Abenberg

== Literature ==
- Genealogisches Handbuch des Adels. Adelslexikon. Band XIII, Band 128 der Gesamtreihe. C. A. Starke Verlag, Limburg (Lahn) 2002, ISSN 0435-2408.
