= Uehlfeld =

- Municipality
- Coat of arms

- Location of Uehlfeld within Neustadt a.d.Aisch-Bad Windsheim district
- Interactive map of Uehlfeld
- Location within Germany Location within Bavaria
- Coordinates: 49°40′N 10°43′E
- Country: Germany
- State: Bavaria
- Admin. region: Mittelfranken
- District: Neustadt a.d.Aisch-Bad Windsheim
- Municipal assoc.: Uehlfeld
- Subdivisions: 13 Ortsteile

Government
  - Mayor (2022–28): Detlef Genz

Area
  - Total: 31.23 km^{2} (12.06 sq mi)
- Elevation: 278 m (912 ft)

Population (2025-12-31)
  - Total: 3,097
  - Density: 99.17/km^{2} (256.8/sq mi)
- Time zone: UTC+01:00 (CET)
  - Summer (DST): UTC+02:00 (CEST)
- Postal codes: 91486
- Dialling codes: 09163
- Vehicle registration: NEA
- Website: www.uehlfeld.de

Uehlfeld is a municipality in the district of Neustadt (Aisch)-Bad Windsheim in the administrative region of Middle Franconia in northern Bavaria in Germany.

== Geography ==
Uehlfeld is located in the valley of the Aisch. The neighbouring municipalities are (from the north in clockwise direction): Lonnerstadt, Höchstadt an der Aisch, Weisendorf, Dachsbach, Gutenstetten, Münchsteinach and Vestenbergsgreuth. The municipality has 12 boroughs: Demantsfürth, Egelsbach, Eselsmühle, Gottesgab, Hohenmühle, Nonnenmühle, Peppenhöchstädt, Rohensaas, Schornweisach, Tragelhöchstädt, Voggendorf und Wallmershof.

== History ==
Uehlfeld was probably founded in the 6th century, at the time Francia expanded to the east and so took possession of the Aischgrund. It is likely that one of the seven Slavonian churches founded by Charlemagne within the Aischgrund stood in Uehlfeld.

The first documented notice of Uehlfeld is from 1123. The village was named Oulentevelt. Later the name changed to Ulletenvelt (1127), Uelevelt (1154), Ulfeldium (1158) or Ulefelt (1181).

Like other villages, Uehlfeld was devastated by several great fires. The last of them occurred in 1888.

Wars have left their marks on Uehlfeld. In the German Peasants' War (1524–1525) the village's castle was destroyed. In the Second Margrave War (1552) the boroughs of Nonndorf and Rothenberg were destroyed and were not rebuilt. The Thirty Years' War left its mark with the actions of Colonel Kehraus, whose troops raided and burned the village.

In 1649 Veit-vom-Berg was assigned pastor of the village. He was born in 1612 in Baudenbach. He held his inaugural speech in front of 31 persons (10 men, 15 women and 6 children), the last inhabitants after a time full of privation.

Before Thirty Years' War. Uehlfeld had 600 inhabitants. Veit-vom-Berg died in Uehlfeld in 1675. Today the elementary and secondary schools and a street are named after him. The number of inhabitants did not again reach 600 until the mid-19th century.

During the 19th century many Jewish salesmen came as new citizens to Uehlfeld, so trade and business developed. The Jews built a synagogue, opened a school, and established a graveyard, the tombstones of which are still to be seen today. In 1837 the Jews of Uehlfeld numbered 300, or about half the population, but by 1933, after the antisemitic campaigns of the Nazi holocaust began, there were only 50 Jewish people left in the town.

The former headmaster of the elementary and secondary schools, Karl Schmer, compiled the history of Uehlfeld into three almanacs, which can be purchased from the municipality office.

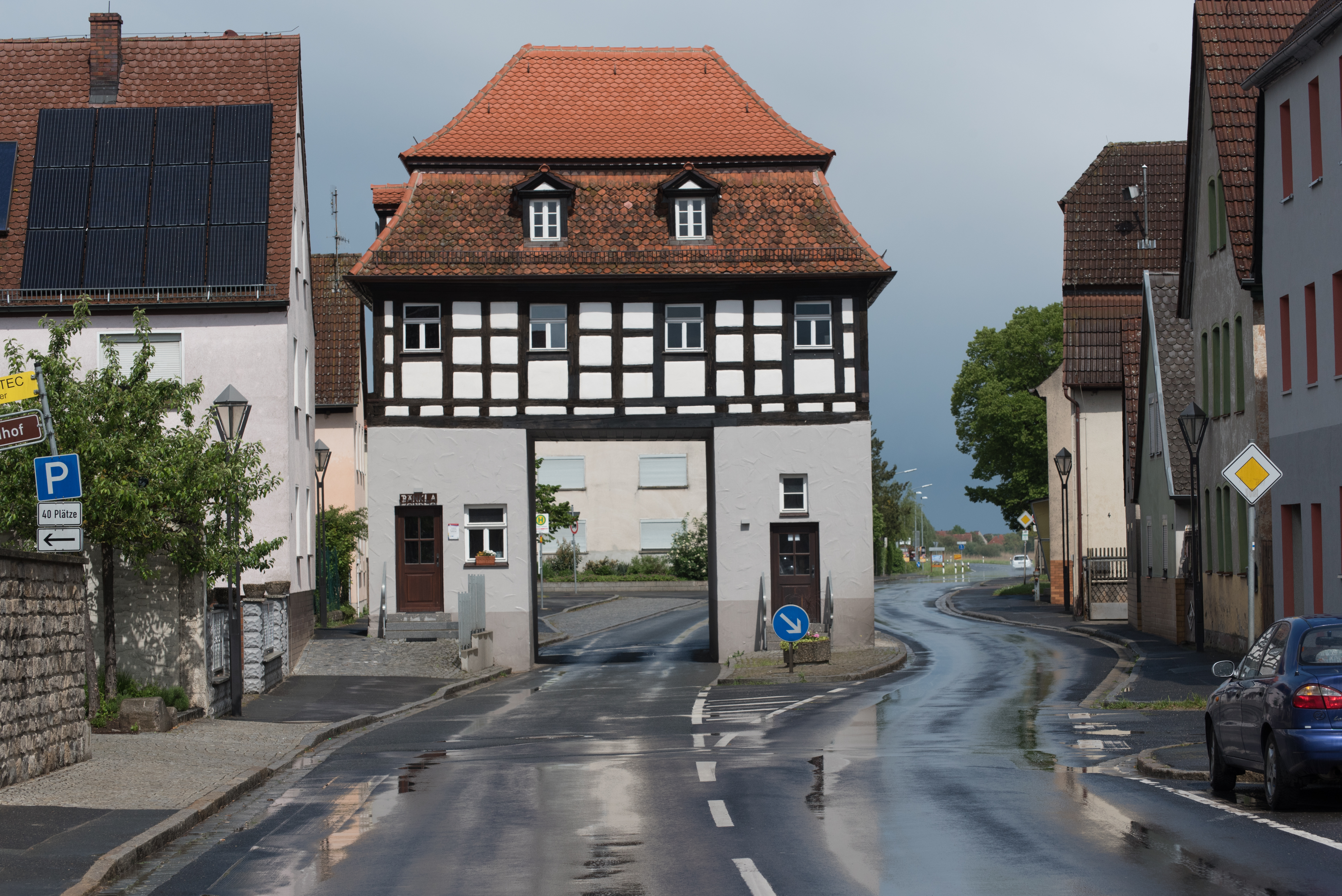
Uehlfeld Main road

=== Local council (Marktgemeinderat) ===
Election March 2014:

- CSU 3 seats
- SPD 1 seat
- Alliance 90/The Greens 3 seats
- Freie Wählergruppe Bürgerblock 4 seats
- Überparteiliche Wählergruppe Schornweisach 3 seats
- Wählergemeinschaft Peppenhöchstädt-Gottesgab-Rohensaas 2 seats

== Economics and Infrastructure ==
Several companies have their head office in Uehlfeld. There are also two breweries, one of them founded in 1639, which makes it the oldest brewery in the Aischgrund.

Federal highway B 470 is directed from north to south through the community area.

From July 12, 1904, until May 30, 1976, there was a railway from Neustadt (Aisch) to Demantsfürth-Uehlfeld called Aischtalbahn which led to the railway Nuremberg Würzburg. It was broken down and since then only busses connect Uehlfeld with the surrounding areas. The lines belong to the pay scale area of VGN.
