= Ergersheim =

Ergersheim may refer to:

- Ergersheim, Middle Franconia, a town in Germany
- Ergersheim, Bas-Rhin, a town in France
