= Tragelhöchstädt =

- Ortsteil of Uehlfeld
- Interactive map of Tragelhöchstädt
- Location within Germany Location within Bavaria
- Coordinates: 49°39′N 10°41′E
- Country: Germany
- State: Bavaria
- Admin. region: Mittelfranken
- District: Neustadt a.d.Aisch-Bad Windsheim
- Municipality: Uehlfeld
- Elevation: 302 m (991 ft)

Population (2011-12-31)
  - Total: 80
- Time zone: UTC+01:00 (CET)
  - Summer (DST): UTC+02:00 (CEST)
- Postal codes: 91486
- Dialling codes: 09163
- Vehicle registration: NEA

Tragelhöchstädt is a village in the municipality of Uehlfeld in the district of Neustadt (Aisch)-Bad Windsheim in Bavaria in Germany.

== Geography and geology ==
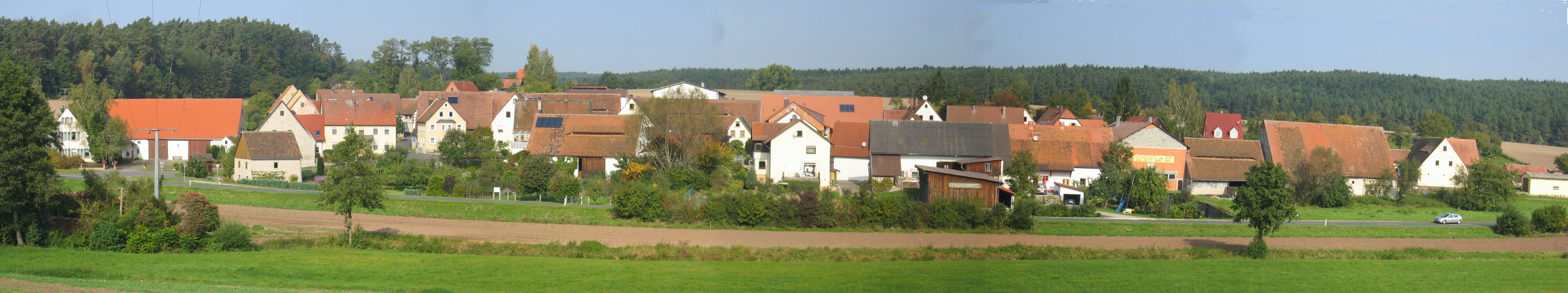
View over Tragelhöchstädt (2008)

The village is located in the southeastern Steigerwald between Uehlfeld and Schornweisach. To the south of the village is the Weisach, a left tributary of the Aisch. The forest area borders Steinlohe to the west, to the north is the Kuckuck forest area. Approximately The Vogelberg rises 0.5 km southwest (313 m above sea level).

The village was founded in a clearing island in the area of the sandstone Keuper. The landscape relief was modeled out in the Neogene and especially in the Pleistocene. The valley filling sedimented by the creeks Weisach and Egelsbach comes from the Holocene. The river system of that time was directed south. As the main river, the prehistoric Main drained into the Danube region.

== History ==
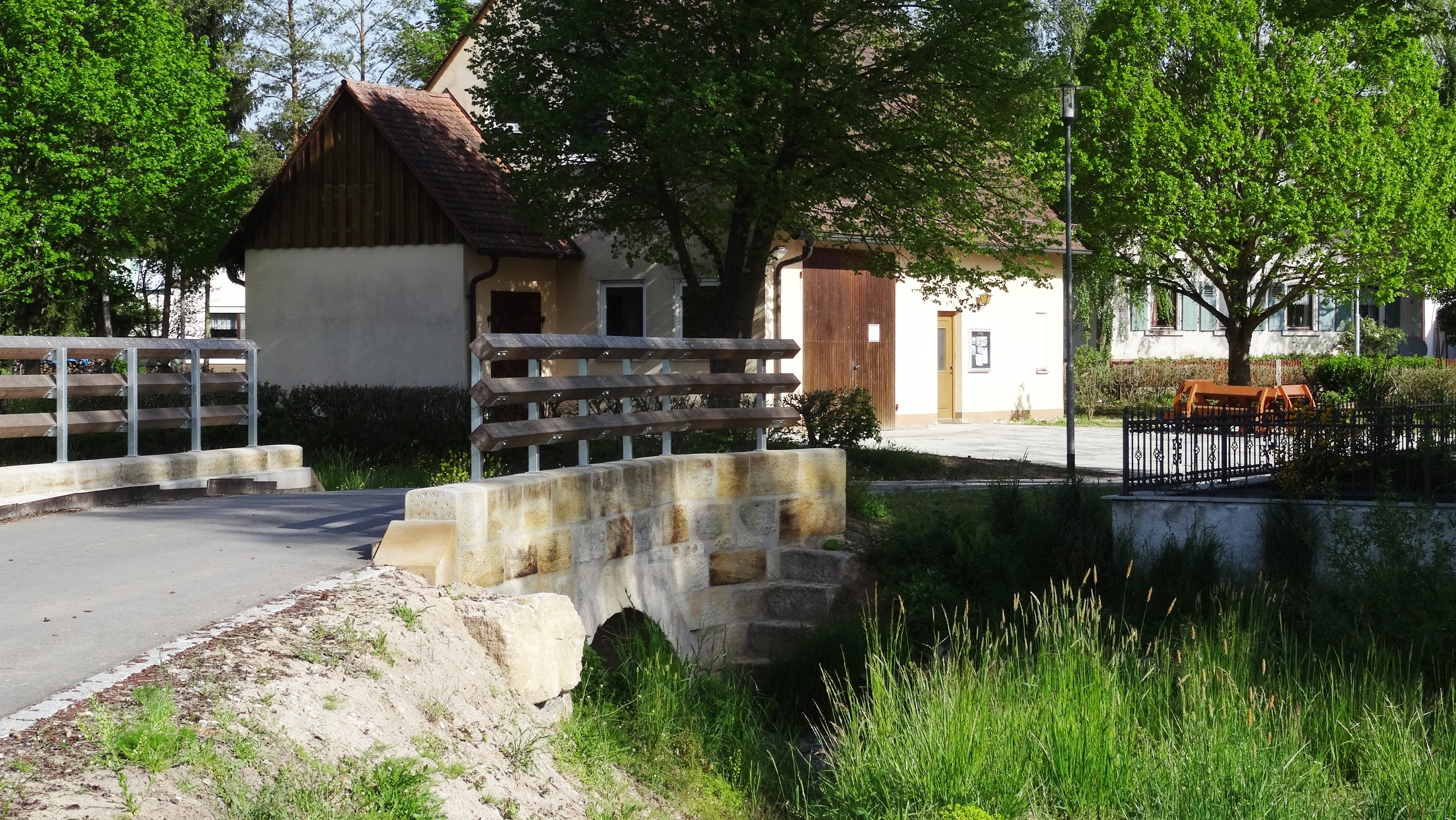
Restored sandstone bridge

The place was first documented in 1303/17 in the fief book of the Würzburg monastery. The place name has changed in the course of time from Drachenhofstet to Drachaltshöststaten, Tracholstösteten, Drachenhofstet and Tregelhöchstädt to the current place name.

The village was burned down in the Thirty Years' War (1634) by wandering hordes of Forchheim, so that in 1639 only two families lived in Tragelhochstädt. Eleven years later it was a Tragelhochstadt man who burned the village down again: he caused a conflagration because he wanted to clear his wild pasture and thereby lost control of the fire. In 1678, the village again housed 178 inhabitants. Towards the end of the 18th century, there were 21 households in Tragelhöchstädt.

In 1810 Tragelhöchstädt came to the new Kingdom of Bavaria. In 1813 it was assigned to the rural community of Oberhöchstädt. With the second community edict (1818) the rural community Tragelhöchstädt was formed, to which the places Egelsbach and Nonnenmühle belonged. In administration and jurisdiction, it was subordinate to the district court of Neustadt an der Aisch and in financial administration to the "Rentamt Neustadt an der Aisch" (renamed in 1920 to "Finanzamt Neustadt an der Aisch"). From 1862, Tragelhöchstädt was administered by the district office of Neustadt an der Aisch. The jurisdiction remained with the district court of Neustadt an der Aisch. The municipality had an area of 2.017 km^{2}.

On July 1, 1971, Tragelhöchstädt was incorporated in the course of the regional reform to Uehlfeld.

== Culinary specialties ==
The "Aischgründer Spiegelkarpfen" (a species of carp) is bred in the ponds north of Tragelhöchstädt.

== Trivia ==
- The dialect poet Helmut Haberkamm mentions the place in his science fiction story "Das wunderliche Gesicht von Tragelhöchstädt" (The Whimsical Face of Tragelhöchstädt).
- In 1861, 115 hundredweights of hops were harvested in Tragelhöchstädt. Hop cultivation ended before World War II.
- Tragelhöchstädt is at the same latitude as Vancouver, BC, Canada.
- The brewery belonging to the "Hübner’s Keller" (famous open-air pub at a beer festival in Erlangen) originally produced its beer in the "Zum golden Schwanen" inn. In 1858, the brewer Conrad Hübner from Tragelhöchstadt took over the brewery and thus gave the open-air pub its name. Today, the "Hübner’s Keller" is one of the most frequented open-air pubs of the Bergkirchweih in the evening.
- In 1873 there were 33 livestock farms in Tragelhöchstädt with a total of 10 horses, 158 cattle, 48 sheep, 20 pigs, 9 goats and 11 beehives.
