= Friedrich Wilhelm Hagen =

German psychiatrist

Friedrich Wilhelm Hagen (16 June 1814 – 13 June 1888) was a German psychiatrist.

== Early life ==
Hagen was born on 16 June 1814 in Dottenheim. His father, also named Friedrich Wilhelm Hagen (1767–1837), was a noted clergyman.

He studied medicine at the Ludwig-Maximilians-Universität München and the University of Erlangen, receiving his doctorate in 1836.

== Career ==
He worked as a medical practitioner in Velden, and in 1844 visited various mental institutions in England, France and Germany (Siegburg, Illenau, Heidelberg and Winnenthal). In 1846, he began work at the district mental hospital in Erlangen as an assistant to Karl August von Solbrig, and three years later, was named director of the mental hospital at Kloster Irsee near Kaufbeuren. In 1859, he succeeded Solbrig as director of the district mental hospital in Erlangen, and during the following year, was appointed professor of psychiatry at the University of Erlangen.

=== King Ludwig II ===
Along with fellow psychiatrists, Bernhard von Gudden, Hubert von Grashey and Max Hubrich (1837–1896), he was tasked with determining the sanity of King Ludwig II of Bavaria. On 8 June 1886, the four doctors unanimously ruled that Ludwig was most likely mentally unfit to govern. Incredibly, up to that point in time, none of the four had ever personally examined the king as a patient.

== Personal life ==
Hagen died in Erlangen on 13 June 1888.

== Selected works ==
- Die Sinnestäuschungen in Bezug auf Psychologie, Heilkunde und Rechtspflege, 1837 – Hallucinations in relation to psychology, medicine and justice.
- Beiträge zur Anthropologie, 1841 – (Contributions to anthropology).
- Psychologische Untersuchungen: Studien im Gebiete der physiologischen Psychologie, 1847 – Psychological studies. Studies in the domain of physiological psychology.
- Studien auf dem Gebiete der aerztlichen Seelenkunde; gemeinfassliche Vorträge, 1870 – Studies in the field of medical psychology; common sense lectures.
- Chorinsky. : Eine gerichtlich psychologische untersuchung, 1872 – Gustav von Chorinsky, a court psychological examination.
