= Wilhelmsdorf =

Wilhelmsdorf may refer to the following towns in Germany:

- Wilhelmsdorf, Baden-Württemberg, in the district of Ravensburg
- Wilhelmsdorf, Bavaria, in the district of Neustadt an der Aisch-Bad Windsheim
- Wilhelmsdorf, Thuringia, in the Saale-Orla-Kreis district
