= Carl Heinrich Wilhelm Hagen =

German historian and politician

Carl Heinrich Wilhelm Hagen (Dietersheim-Dottenheim, 10 October 1810 – Bern, 24 January 1868), also Karl Hagen, was a German historian and member of the Frankfurt Parliament.
