= Uehlfeld (Verwaltungsgemeinschaft) =

- Verwaltungsgemeinschaft
- Location of Uehlfeld within Neustadt (Aisch)-Bad Windsheim district
- Interactive map of Uehlfeld
- Location within Germany Location within Bavaria
- Coordinates: 49°40′N 10°43′E
- Country: Germany
- State: Bavaria
- Admin. region: Middle Franconia
- District: Neustadt (Aisch)-Bad Windsheim
- Seat: Uehlfeld
- Subdivisions: 3 municipalities

Area
  - Total: 79.02 km^{2} (30.51 sq mi)

Population (2025-12-31)
  - Total: 7,420
  - Density: 93.9/km^{2} (243/sq mi)
- Time zone: UTC+01:00 (CET)
  - Summer (DST): UTC+02:00 (CEST)
- Website: www.vg-uehlfeld.de

Uehlfeld is a Verwaltungsgemeinschaft (municipal association) in the district Neustadt (Aisch)-Bad Windsheim in Bavaria, Germany. Its seat is in Uehlfeld.

It consists of the following municipalities:

1. Dachsbach
2. Gerhardshofen
3. Uehlfeld
