= Weigenheim =

- Municipality
- Coat of arms

- Location of Weigenheim within Neustadt a.d.Aisch-Bad Windsheim district
- Interactive map of Weigenheim
- Location within Germany Location within Bavaria
- Coordinates: 49°34′N 10°16′E
- Country: Germany
- State: Bavaria
- Admin. region: Mittelfranken
- District: Neustadt a.d.Aisch-Bad Windsheim
- Municipal assoc.: Uffenheim
- Subdivisions: 7 Ortsteile

Government
  - Mayor (2020–26): Rainer Mayer

Area
  - Total: 32.66 km^{2} (12.61 sq mi)
- Elevation: 332 m (1,089 ft)

Population (2025-12-31)
  - Total: 956
  - Density: 29.3/km^{2} (75.8/sq mi)
- Time zone: UTC+01:00 (CET)
  - Summer (DST): UTC+02:00 (CEST)
- Postal codes: 97215
- Dialling codes: 09842
- Vehicle registration: NEA
- Website: www.weigenheim.de

Weigenheim is a municipality in the district of Neustadt (Aisch)-Bad Windsheim in Bavaria in Germany.
