= Hagenbüchach-Wilhelmsdorf =

- Verwaltungsgemeinschaft
- Location of Hagenbüchach-Wilhelmsdorf within Neustadt (Aisch)-Bad Windsheim district
- Interactive map of Hagenbüchach-Wilhelmsdorf
- Location within Germany Location within Bavaria
- Coordinates: 49°34′N 10°44′E
- Country: Germany
- State: Bavaria
- Admin. region: Middle Franconia
- District: Neustadt (Aisch)-Bad Windsheim
- Seat: Wilhelmsdorf
- Subdivisions: 2 municipalities

Area
  - Total: 19.30 km^{2} (7.45 sq mi)

Population (2025-12-31)
  - Total: 3,092
  - Density: 160.2/km^{2} (414.9/sq mi)
- Time zone: UTC+01:00 (CET)
  - Summer (DST): UTC+02:00 (CEST)
- Website: vgem-hagenbuechach-wilhelmsdorf.de

Hagenbüchach-Wilhelmsdorf is a Verwaltungsgemeinschaft (municipal association) in the district Neustadt (Aisch)-Bad Windsheim in Bavaria, Germany. Its seat is in Wilhelmsdorf.

It consists of the following municipalities:

1. Hagenbüchach
2. Wilhelmsdorf
