= Simmershofen =

- Municipality
- Coat of arms

- Location of Simmershofen within Neustadt a.d.Aisch-Bad Windsheim district
- Interactive map of Simmershofen
- Location within Germany Location within Bavaria
- Coordinates: 49°31′N 10°7′E
- Country: Germany
- State: Bavaria
- Admin. region: Mittelfranken
- District: Neustadt a.d.Aisch-Bad Windsheim
- Municipal assoc.: Uffenheim
- Subdivisions: 6 Ortsteile

Government
  - Mayor (2020–26): Florian Hirsch

Area
  - Total: 34.19 km^{2} (13.20 sq mi)
- Elevation: 324 m (1,063 ft)

Population (2025-12-31)
  - Total: 955
  - Density: 27.9/km^{2} (72.3/sq mi)
- Time zone: UTC+01:00 (CET)
  - Summer (DST): UTC+02:00 (CEST)
- Postal codes: 97215
- Dialling codes: 09848
- Vehicle registration: NEA
- Website: www.simmershofen.de

Simmershofen (German pronunciation: [ˈzɪmɐsˌhoːfn̩]) is a municipality in the district of Neustadt (Aisch)-Bad Windsheim in Bavaria in Germany.
