= Neustadt (Aisch)–Demantsfürth-Uehlfeld railway =

Railway line in Germany

Neustadt (Aisch)–Demantsforth-Uehlfeld

Overview
- Line number: 5915

Technical
- Line length: 15.4 km (9.6 mi)
- Track gauge: 1,435 mm (4 ft 8 1/2 in)

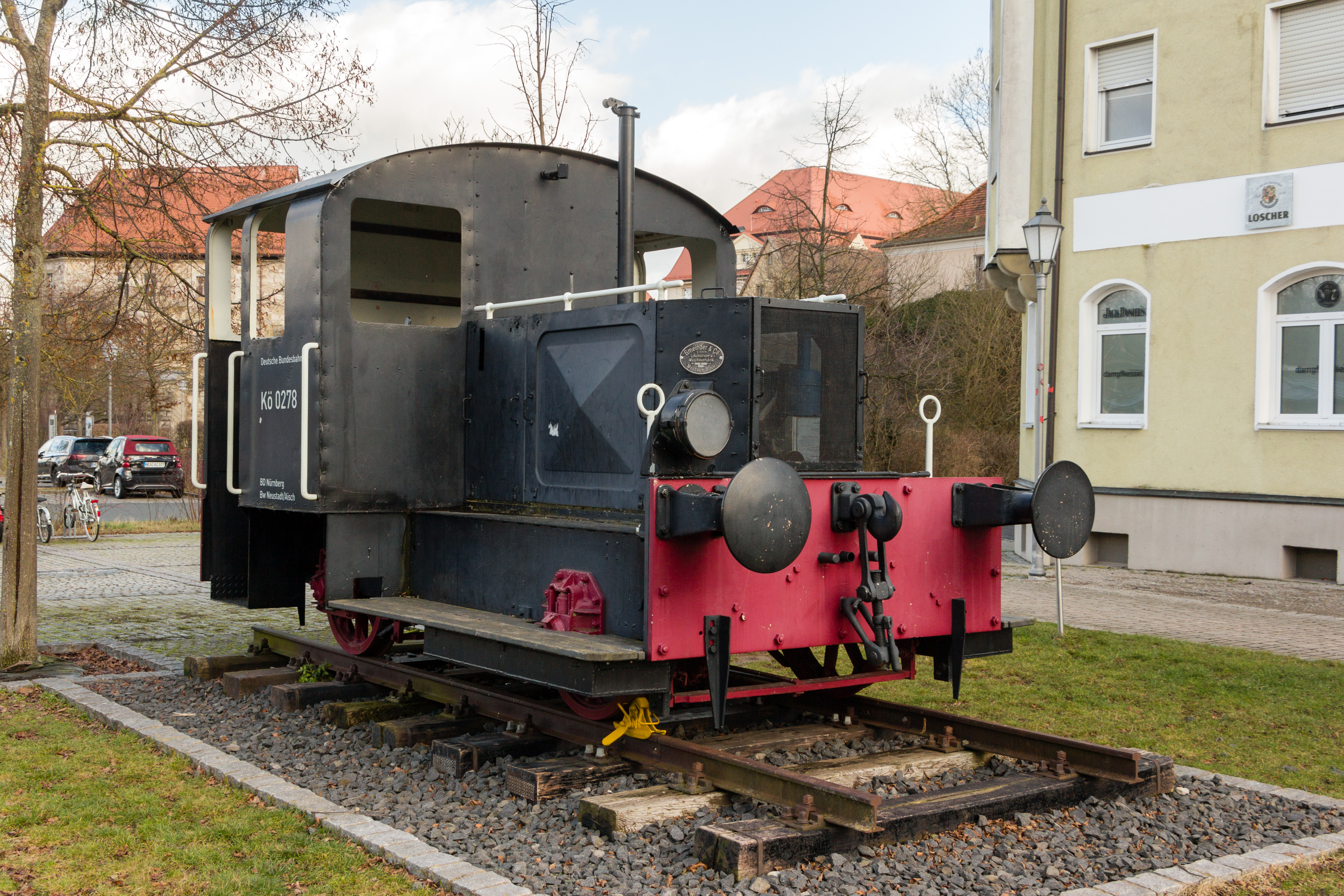
Neustadt an der Aisch, Aischtalbahn Memorial

The Neustadt (Aisch)–Demantsforth-Uehlfeld railway (also known locally as the Aischtalbahn, not to be confused with the Aischgrundbahn) was a branch line in southern Germany that links the market town of Uehlfeld in the Bavarian province of Middle Franconia with Neustadt an der Aisch on the Nuremberg–Würzburg main line.

== History ==
The Royal Bavarian State Railways began operations on this single-tracked, standard gauge Lokalbahn through the Aischgrund on 12 July 1904. Leaving Neustadt (Aisch) station the line runs in a northeasterly direction first to the minor station at Neustadt (Aisch) Stadt (km 1.5) and then the along the river as far as the Uehlfeld district of Demantsforth, where the terminus was built, about two kilometres from the centre of Uehlfeld. An extension of the railway down the valley to Höchstadt an der Aisch, which would have proved a through connexion to Forchheim, did not come to fruition.

The number of train pairs rose from 3 in 1904 to 4 in 1914; this level of service was also provided in 1939 again. After the Second World War an even better service was provided on the line: in 1950 there were six pairs of trains during the week, as many as seven on Saturdays and four on Sundays.

As the Deutsche Bundesbahn steadily drew down its services on branch lines, rail traffic on the line was reduced to working days only during the 1970s and, on 30 May 1976, passenger services were withdrawn and replaced by railway-operated buses. Goods traffic continued until 23 September 1993 and the line was officially closed at the end of 1993.

== See also ==
- Royal Bavarian State Railways
- Bavarian branch lines
- List of closed railway lines in Bavaria

== Sources ==
- Wolfgang Bleiweis, Ekkehard Martin: Fränkische Nebenbahnen einst and jetzt – Mittel- and Unterfranken. Egglham 1987
