= Hemmersheim =

- Municipality
- Coat of arms

- Location of Hemmersheim within Neustadt a.d.Aisch-Bad Windsheim district
- Interactive map of Hemmersheim
- Location within Germany Location within Bavaria
- Coordinates: 49°34′N 10°5′E
- Country: Germany
- State: Bavaria
- Admin. region: Mittelfranken
- District: Neustadt a.d.Aisch-Bad Windsheim
- Municipal assoc.: Uffenheim
- Subdivisions: 6 Ortsteile

Government
  - Mayor (2020–26): Karl Ballmann

Area
  - Total: 23.86 km^{2} (9.21 sq mi)
- Elevation: 389 m (1,276 ft)

Population (2025-12-31)
  - Total: 655
  - Density: 27.5/km^{2} (71.1/sq mi)
- Time zone: UTC+01:00 (CET)
  - Summer (DST): UTC+02:00 (CEST)
- Postal codes: 97258
- Dialling codes: 09848
- Vehicle registration: NEA

Hemmersheim is a municipality in the district of Neustadt (Aisch)-Bad Windsheim in Bavaria in Germany.
