= Neuhof an der Zenn =

Neuhof a.d.Zenn
- Municipality
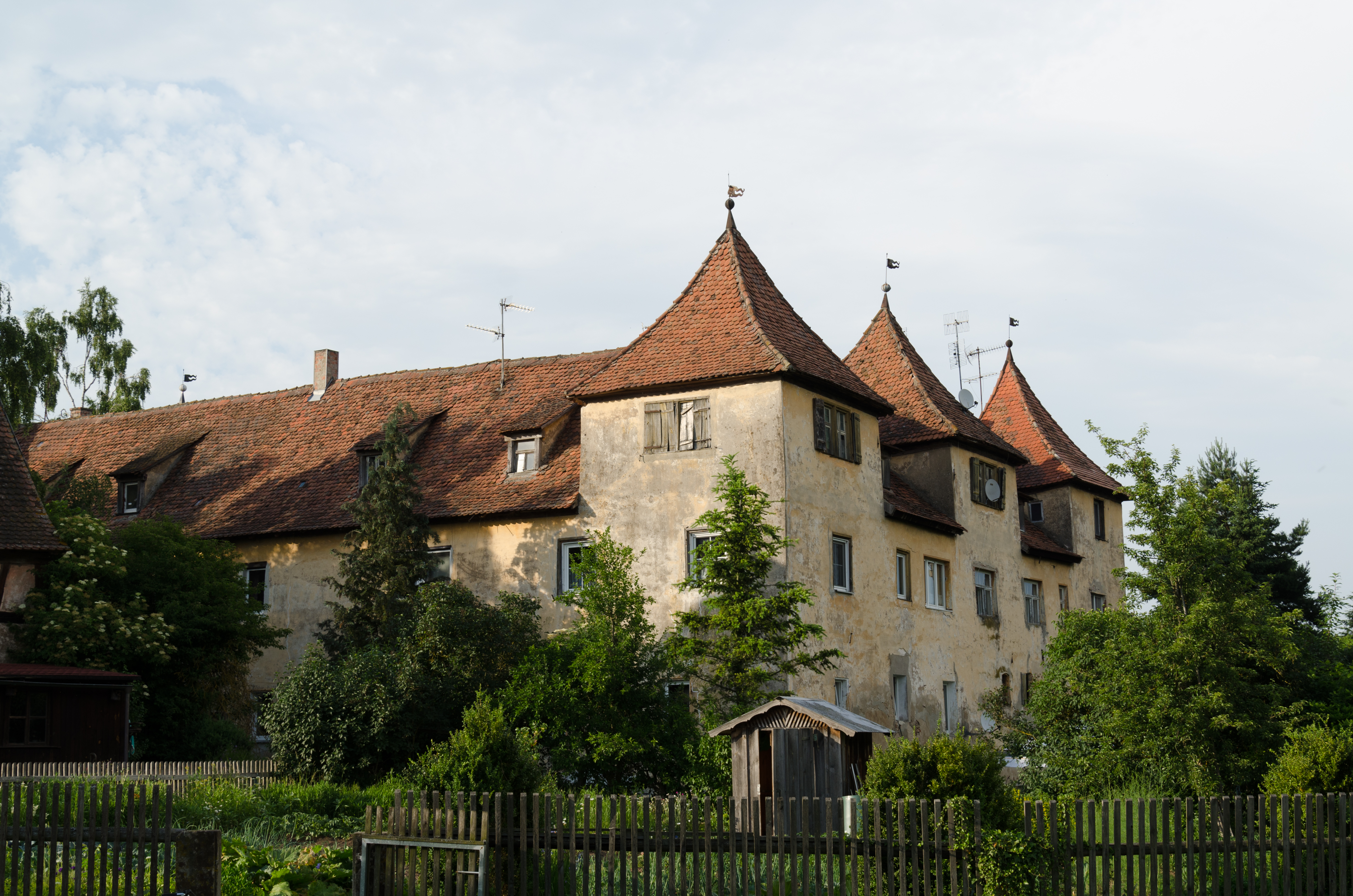
- Neuhof an der Zenn Castle

- Coat of arms

- Location of Neuhof a.d.Zenn within Neustadt a.d.Aisch-Bad Windsheim district
- Interactive map of Neuhof a.d.Zenn
- Location within Germany Location within Bavaria
- Coordinates: 49°27′24″N 10°38′36″E
- Country: Germany
- State: Bavaria
- Admin. region: Mittelfranken
- District: Neustadt a.d.Aisch-Bad Windsheim
- Municipal assoc.: Neuhof an der Zenn
- Subdivisions: 14 Ortsteile

Government
  - Mayor (2020–26): Claudia Wust

Area
  - Total: 30.94 km^{2} (11.95 sq mi)
- Elevation: 334 m (1,096 ft)

Population (2025-12-31)
  - Total: 2,186
  - Density: 70.65/km^{2} (183.0/sq mi)
- Time zone: UTC+01:00 (CET)
  - Summer (DST): UTC+02:00 (CEST)
- Postal codes: 90616
- Dialling codes: 09107
- Vehicle registration: NEA
- Website: www.neuhof-zenn.de

Neuhof an der Zenn is a municipality in the district of Neustadt (Aisch)-Bad Windsheim in Bavaria in Germany. The municipality's mayor since 2020 is Claudia Wust.
