= Oberickelsheim =

- Municipality
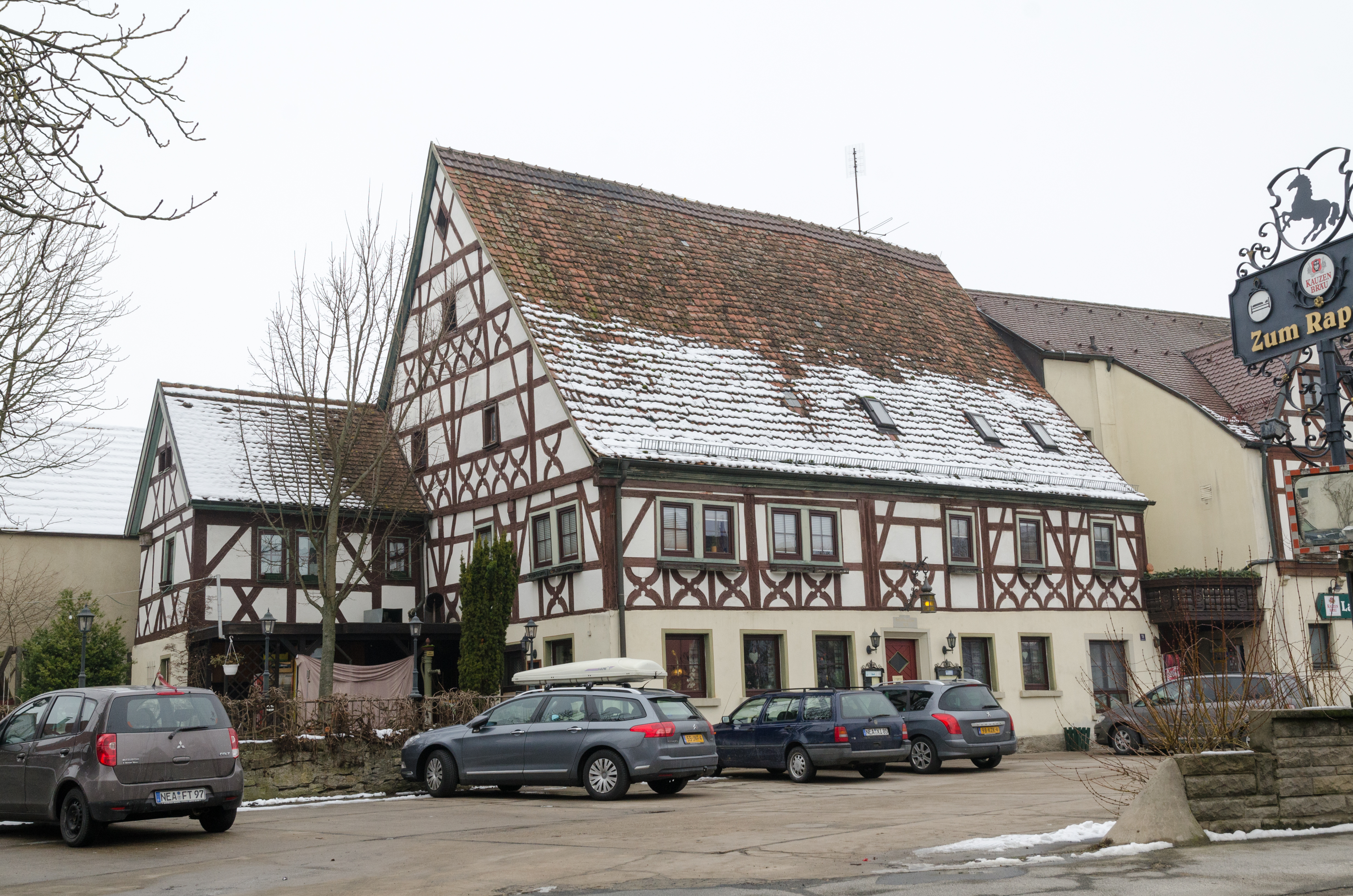
- Building at Hauptstraße 19

- Coat of arms

- Location of Oberickelsheim within Neustadt a.d.Aisch-Bad Windsheim district
- Interactive map of Oberickelsheim
- Location within Germany Location within Bavaria
- Coordinates: 49°36′N 10°7′E
- Country: Germany
- State: Bavaria
- Admin. region: Mittelfranken
- District: Neustadt a.d.Aisch-Bad Windsheim
- Municipal assoc.: Uffenheim
- Subdivisions: 3 Ortsteile

Government
  - Mayor (2020–26): Michael Pfanzer

Area
  - Total: 18.22 km^{2} (7.03 sq mi)
- Elevation: 320 m (1,050 ft)

Population (2025-12-31)
  - Total: 729
  - Density: 40.0/km^{2} (104/sq mi)
- Time zone: UTC+01:00 (CET)
  - Summer (DST): UTC+02:00 (CEST)
- Postal codes: 97258
- Dialling codes: 09339
- Vehicle registration: NEA
- Website: www.oberickelsheim.de

Oberickelsheim is a municipality in the district of Neustadt (Aisch)-Bad Windsheim in Bavaria in Germany.

== Mayor ==
Michael Pfanzer was elected the new mayor in March 2014. He is the successor of Martin Hümmer.
