= Forchheim–Höchstadt railway =

Railway line in Germany

Forchheim–Höchstadt

Overview
- Line number: 5112

Service
- Route number: 822

Technical
- Line length: 22.7 km (14.1 mi)
- Track gauge: 1,435 mm (4 ft 8 1/2 in)

The Forchheim–Höchstadt an der Aisch railway linked the Upper Franconian county town of Forchheim to the county town of the former neighbouring county of Höchstadt via the lower Aisch Bottom (Aischgrund). It is also known in German as the Aischgrundbahn (not to be confused with the Aischtalbahn), Hirtenbachtalbahn or Hemhofenbahn.

== History ==
The 23 kilometre long standard gauge branch line was opened as a Lokalbahn on 16 November 1892 by the Royal Bavarian State Railways. Passenger traffic was lively: in 1963 nine pairs of trains ran daily on weekdays and five on Sundays.

Passenger services ended on 28 September 1984. In response to that the „Localbahn Aischgrund Society was founded in 1984 in an attempt to set up a museum railway line. This plan only partly succeeded however, in that they became an agent for other museum railways. In 1999 the society was dissolved. The last goods train between Hemhofen and Höchstadt ran on 2 March 1995. The closure of this section of line took place on 1 October 1995. Goods services to Hemhofen ended on 31 December 1999.

In the 1990s the railway was also part of a Maximalnetz planned by the Stadt-Umland-Bahn Erlangen (StUB), a project by the town of Erlangen and the counties of Erlangen-Höchstadt and Forchheim. It was proposed that, as a first step, a diesel-operated passenger service would be revived between Forchheim and Hemhofen and, then later, a possible extension to Höchstadt would follow. In 2002 discussions about the reactivation of the line foundered, when the communities involved were not prepared to take on the financial risk.

As a consequence the Deutsche Bahn began a process in late 2002, in accordance with § 11 of the General Railway Law (AEG) for the release and closure of railway infrastructure on the remaining Forchheim–Hemhofen section. The efforts of the Deutsche Regionaleisenbahn, who had rented the line for a time, were fruitless. On 1 April 2005 the section of line was closed.

On 4 September 2007 the Federal Railway Office finally started the process for the final release of the entire 22 kilometre long route, which was formally approved on 21 February 2008. That meant that the railway now existed legally no more. Gradually the land was used for the construction of local bypasses and cycle paths.

== Sources ==
- Wolfgang Bleiweis, Ekkehard Martin, Stefan Winkler: Fränkische Nebenbahnen einst and jetzt – Oberfranken. Bufe-Fachbuch-Verlag, Egglham 1986. ISBN 3-922138-25-X.
