= Diespeck (Verwaltungsgemeinschaft) =

- Verwaltungsgemeinschaft
- Location of Diespeck within Neustadt (Aisch)-Bad Windsheim district
- Interactive map of Diespeck
- Location within Germany Location within Bavaria
- Coordinates: 49°36′N 10°38′E
- Country: Germany
- State: Bavaria
- Admin. region: Middle Franconia
- District: Neustadt (Aisch)-Bad Windsheim
- Seat: Diespeck
- Subdivisions: 4 municipalities

Area
  - Total: 93.91 km^{2} (36.26 sq mi)

Population (2025-12-31)
  - Total: 7,658
  - Density: 81.55/km^{2} (211.2/sq mi)
- Time zone: UTC+01:00 (CET)
  - Summer (DST): UTC+02:00 (CEST)
- Website: www.vg-diespeck.de

Diespeck is a Verwaltungsgemeinschaft (municipal association) in the district Neustadt (Aisch)-Bad Windsheim in Bavaria, Germany. Its seat is in Diespeck.

It consists of the following municipalities:

1. Baudenbach
2. Diespeck
3. Gutenstetten
4. Münchsteinach
