= Uffenheim (Verwaltungsgemeinschaft) =

- Verwaltungsgemeinschaft
- Location of Uffenheim within Neustadt (Aisch)-Bad Windsheim district
- Interactive map of Uffenheim
- Location within Germany Location within Bavaria
- Coordinates: 49°33′N 10°14′E
- Country: Germany
- State: Bavaria
- Admin. region: Middle Franconia
- District: Neustadt (Aisch)-Bad Windsheim
- Seat: Uffenheim
- Subdivisions: 9 municipalities

Area
  - Total: 278.24 km^{2} (107.43 sq mi)

Population (2025-12-31)
  - Total: 13,968
  - Density: 50.201/km^{2} (130.02/sq mi)
- Time zone: UTC+01:00 (CET)
  - Summer (DST): UTC+02:00 (CEST)
- Website: www.verwaltungsgemeinschaft-uffenheim.de

Uffenheim is a Verwaltungsgemeinschaft (municipal association) in the district Neustadt (Aisch)-Bad Windsheim in Bavaria, Germany. Its seat is in Uffenheim.

It consists of the following municipalities:

1. Ergersheim
2. Gollhofen
3. Hemmersheim
4. Ippesheim
5. Markt Nordheim
6. Oberickelsheim
7. Simmershofen
8. Uffenheim
9. Weigenheim
