= Markt Nordheim =

- Municipality
- Coat of arms

- Location of Markt Nordheim within Neustadt a.d.Aisch-Bad Windsheim district
- Interactive map of Markt Nordheim
- Location within Germany Location within Bavaria
- Coordinates: 49°34′N 10°20′E
- Country: Germany
- State: Bavaria
- Admin. region: Mittelfranken
- District: Neustadt a.d.Aisch-Bad Windsheim
- Municipal assoc.: Uffenheim
- Subdivisions: 7 Ortsteile

Government
  - Mayor (2020–26): Harald Endreß

Area
  - Total: 39.32 km^{2} (15.18 sq mi)
- Elevation: 332 m (1,089 ft)

Population (2025-12-31)
  - Total: 1,136
  - Density: 28.89/km^{2} (74.83/sq mi)
- Time zone: UTC+01:00 (CET)
  - Summer (DST): UTC+02:00 (CEST)
- Postal codes: 91478
- Dialling codes: 09165
- Vehicle registration: NEA
- Website: www.markt-nordheim.de

Markt Nordheim is a municipality in the district of Neustadt (Aisch)-Bad Windsheim in Franconia in Germany.

== Mayor ==
Harald Endreß was elected the new mayor in March 2014. He is the successor of Hans Strauß.
