= Neuhof an der Zenn (Verwaltungsgemeinschaft) =

- Verwaltungsgemeinschaft
- Location of Neuhof an der Zenn within Neustadt (Aisch)-Bad Windsheim district
- Interactive map of Neuhof an der Zenn
- Location within Germany Location within Bavaria
- Coordinates: 49°27′N 10°39′E
- Country: Germany
- State: Bavaria
- Admin. region: Middle Franconia
- District: Neustadt (Aisch)-Bad Windsheim
- Seat: Neuhof an der Zenn
- Subdivisions: 2 municipalities

Area
  - Total: 50.66 km^{2} (19.56 sq mi)

Population (2025-12-31)
  - Total: 3,495
  - Density: 68.99/km^{2} (178.7/sq mi)
- Time zone: UTC+01:00 (CET)
  - Summer (DST): UTC+02:00 (CEST)
- Website: www.vg-neuhof.de

Neuhof an der Zenn is a Verwaltungsgemeinschaft (municipal association) in the district Neustadt (Aisch)-Bad Windsheim in Bavaria, Germany. Its seat is in Neuhof an der Zenn.

It consists of the following municipalities:

1. Neuhof an der Zenn
2. Trautskirchen
