= Hagenbüchach =

- Municipality
- Coat of arms

- Location of Hagenbüchach within Neustadt a.d.Aisch-Bad Windsheim district
- Interactive map of Hagenbüchach
- Location within Germany Location within Bavaria
- Coordinates: 49°31′N 10°46′E
- Country: Germany
- State: Bavaria
- Admin. region: Mittelfranken
- District: Neustadt a.d.Aisch-Bad Windsheim
- Municipal assoc.: Hagenbüchach-Wilhelmsdorf
- Subdivisions: 5 Gemeindeteile

Government
  - Mayor (2020–26): David Schneider

Area
  - Total: 11.50 km^{2} (4.44 sq mi)
- Elevation: 383 m (1,257 ft)

Population (2025-12-31)
  - Total: 1,652
  - Density: 143.7/km^{2} (372.1/sq mi)
- Time zone: UTC+01:00 (CET)
  - Summer (DST): UTC+02:00 (CEST)
- Postal codes: 91469
- Dialling codes: 09101
- Vehicle registration: NEA
- Website: www.hagenbuechach.de

Hagenbüchach is a municipality in the district of Neustadt (Aisch)-Bad Windsheim in Bavaria in Germany.

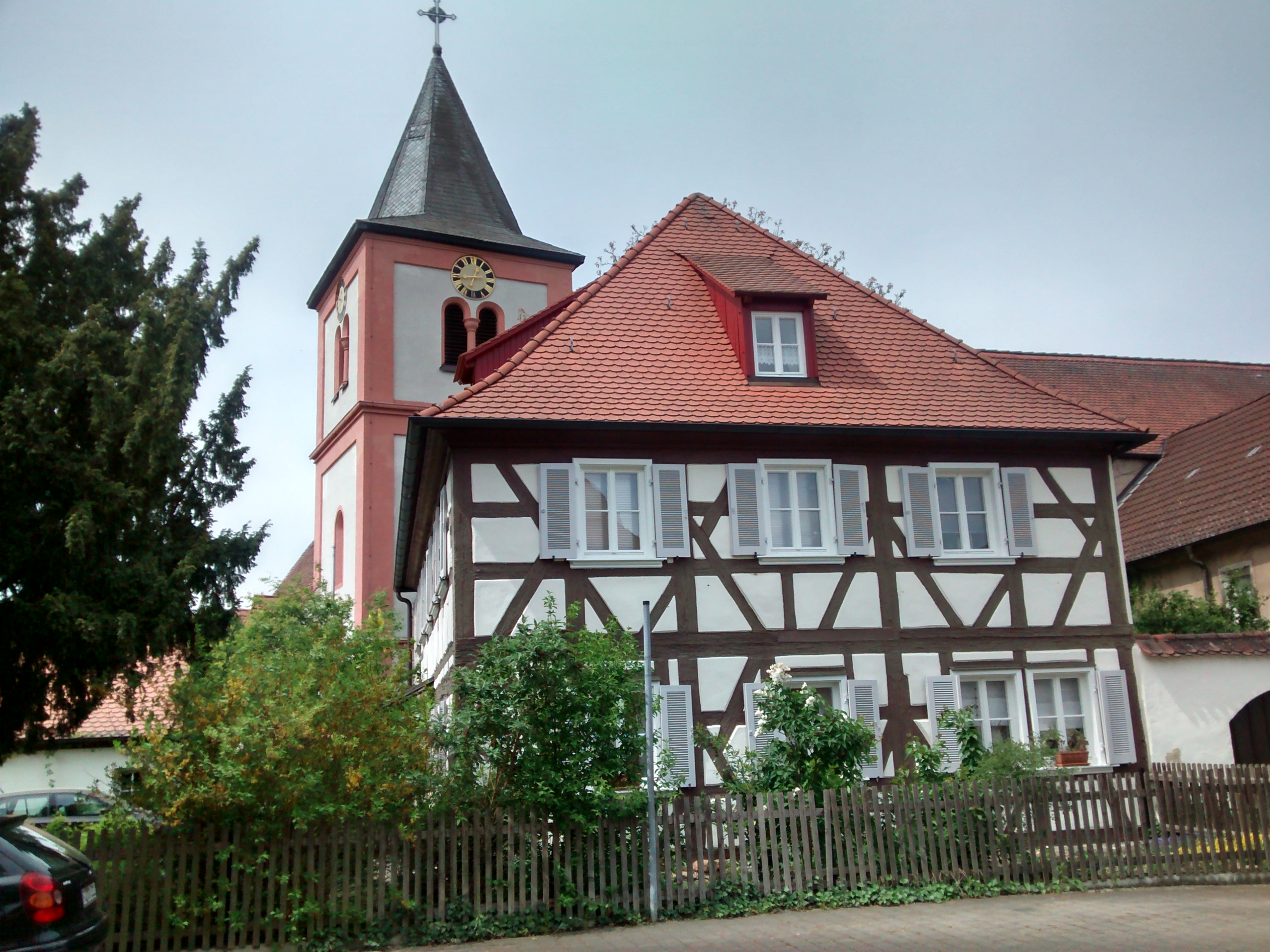
Hagenbüchach Rectory
