= Trautskirchen =

- Municipality
- Coat of arms

- Location of Trautskirchen within Neustadt a.d.Aisch-Bad Windsheim district
- Interactive map of Trautskirchen
- Location within Germany Location within Bavaria
- Coordinates: 49°27′N 10°35′E
- Country: Germany
- State: Bavaria
- Admin. region: Mittelfranken
- District: Neustadt a.d.Aisch-Bad Windsheim
- Municipal assoc.: Neuhof an der Zenn
- Subdivisions: 10 Ortsteile

Government
  - Mayor (2020–26): Werner Wirth (SPD)

Area
  - Total: 19.83 km^{2} (7.66 sq mi)
- Elevation: 340 m (1,120 ft)

Population (2025-12-31)
  - Total: 1,309
  - Density: 66.01/km^{2} (171.0/sq mi)
- Time zone: UTC+01:00 (CET)
  - Summer (DST): UTC+02:00 (CEST)
- Postal codes: 90619
- Dialling codes: 09107
- Vehicle registration: NEA
- Website: www.trautskirchen.de

Trautskirchen is a municipality in the district of Neustadt (Aisch)-Bad Windsheim in Bavaria in Germany.

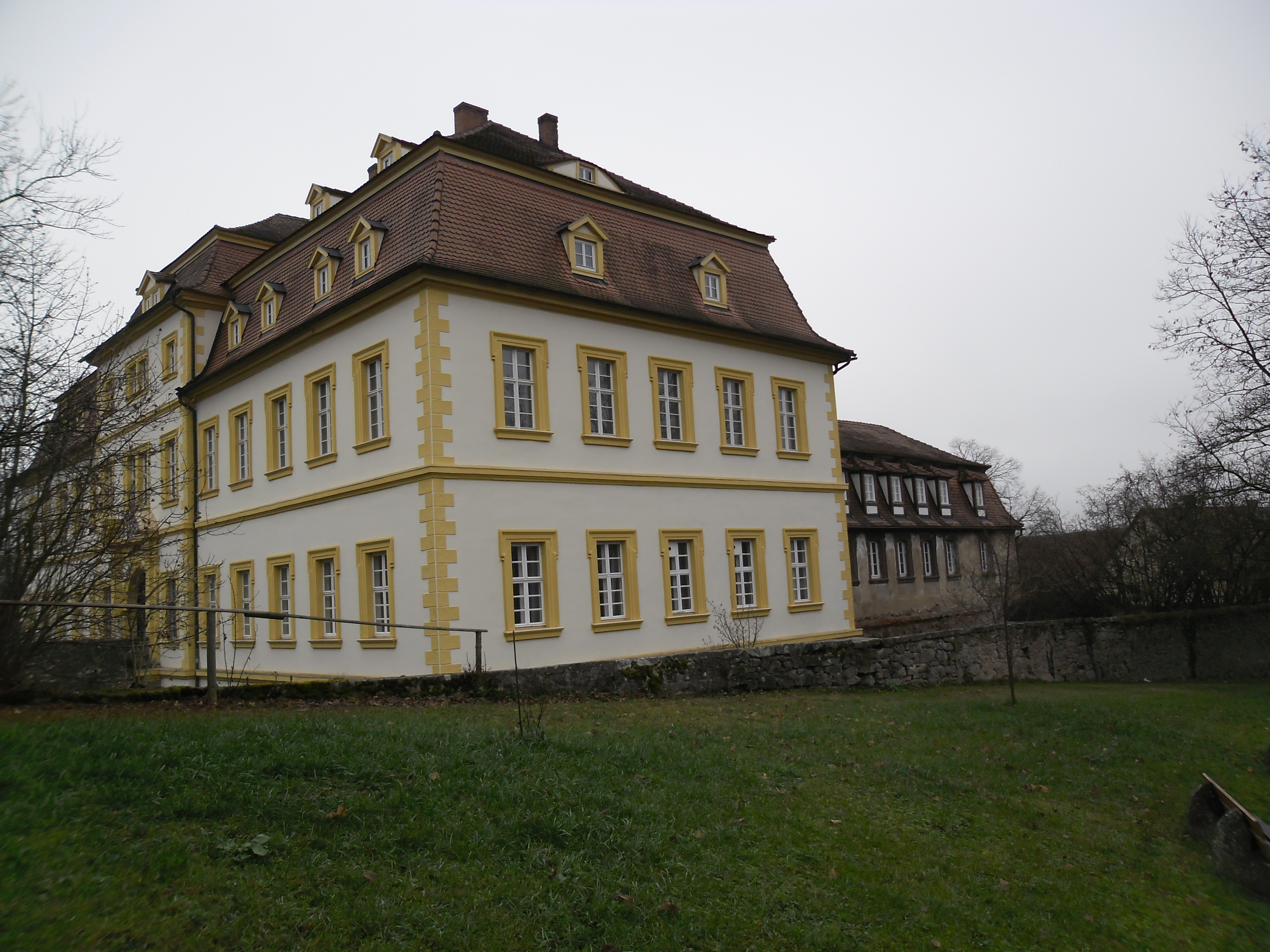
Trautskirchen castle

== Personalities ==
- Hans Böckler (1875 in Trautskirchen - 1951 in Köln-Lindenthal) was a German union leader and politician
