= Neustadt (Aisch)-Bad Windsheim =

Coordinates: 49°35′N 10°30′E

- District
- Flag Coat of arms
- Country: Germany
- State: Bavaria
- Adm. region: Middle Franconia
- Capital: Neustadt (Aisch)

Government
  - District admin.: Helmut Weiß (CSU)

Area
  - Total: 1,267.54 km^{2} (489.40 sq mi)

Population (31 December 2025)
  - Total: 100,767
  - Density: 79.4981/km^{2} (205.899/sq mi)
- Time zone: UTC+01:00 (CET)
  - Summer (DST): UTC+02:00 (CEST)
- Vehicle registration: NEA, SEF, UFF
- Website: www.landkreis-nea.de

Neustadt (Aisch)-Bad Windsheim (German: Landkreis Neustadt an der Aisch-Bad Windsheim, official Landkreis Neustadt a.d.Aisch-Bad Windsheim) is a Landkreis (district) in Bavaria, Germany. It is bounded by (from the west and clockwise) the districts of Würzburg, Kitzingen, Bamberg, Erlangen-Höchstadt, Fürth and Ansbach, and by the state of Baden-Württemberg (district Main-Tauber).

== History ==
The district was established in 1972 by merging the former districts of Neustadt (Aisch), Uffenheim and Scheinfeld.

== Geography ==
The district is covered by the Steigerwald and Frankenhöhe nature parks, both comprising large forested and hilly areas. The Aisch, a small affluent of the Regnitz River, runs through the district from southwest to northeast, with all main towns of the district on its banks.

== Economy ==
In 2017 (latest data available) the GDP per inhabitant was €29,307. This places the district 82nd out of 96 districts (rural and urban) in Bavaria (overall average: €46,698).

== Coat of arms ==
The coat of arms displays:

- the dog from the arms of the margraves of Nuremberg
- the eagle from the arms of the Hohenzollern dynasty
- the blue and white bars from the lords of Seinsheim

== Towns and municipalities ==
Clickable map of towns and municipalities in the district

Towns
1. Bad Windsheim
2. Neustadt an der Aisch
Märkte
1. Burghaslach
2. Emskirchen
3. Ipsheim
4. Markt Erlbach
5. Obernzenn
Municipalities
1. Dietersheim

Verwaltungsgemeinschaften
1. Burgbernheim; 1. Burgbernheim^{1,2}; 2. Gallmersgarten; 3. Illesheim; 4. Marktbergel^{3}; 2. Diespeck; 1. Baudenbach^{3}; 2. Diespeck^{1}; 3. Gutenstetten; 4. Münchsteinach	3. Hagenbüchach-Wilhelmsdorf; 1. Hagenbüchach; 2. Wilhelmsdorf^{1}; 4. Neuhof an der Zenn; 1. Neuhof an der Zenn^{1,3}; 2. Trautskirchen	5. Scheinfeld; 1. Langenfeld; 2. Markt Bibart^{3}; 3. Markt Taschendorf^{3}; 4. Oberscheinfeld^{3}; 5. Scheinfeld^{1,2}; 6. Sugenheim^{3}	6. Uehlfeld; 1. Dachsbach^{3}; 2. Gerhardshofen; 3. Uehlfeld^{1,3}	7. Uffenheim; 1. Ergersheim; 2. Gollhofen; 3. Hemmersheim; 4. Ippesheim^{3}; 5. Markt Nordheim^{3}; 6. Oberickelsheim; 7. Simmershofen; 8. Uffenheim^{1,2}; 9. Weigenheim
^{1}seat of the Verwaltungsgemeinschaft; ^{2}town; ^{3}Markt
