= Wilhelmsdorf, Bavaria =

Wilhelmsdorf
- Municipality
- Coat of arms

- Location of Wilhelmsdorf within Neustadt a.d.Aisch-Bad Windsheim district
- Interactive map of Wilhelmsdorf
- Location within Germany Location within Bavaria
- Coordinates: 49°34′N 10°44′E
- Country: Germany
- State: Bavaria
- Admin. region: Central Franconia
- District: Neustadt a.d.Aisch-Bad Windsheim
- Municipal assoc.: Hagenbüchach-Wilhelmsdorf
- Subdivisions: 6 districts

Government
  - Mayor (2023–29): Rüdiger Probst

Area
  - Total: 7.81 km^{2} (3.02 sq mi)
- Elevation: 348 m (1,142 ft)

Population (2025-12-31)
  - Total: 1,440
  - Density: 184/km^{2} (478/sq mi)
- Time zone: UTC+01:00 (CET)
  - Summer (DST): UTC+02:00 (CEST)
- Postal codes: 91489
- Dialling codes: 09104
- Vehicle registration: NEA
- Website: www.wilhelmsdorf.de

Wilhelmsdorf (German pronunciation: [ˈvɪlhɛlmsˌdɔʁf]) is a municipality in the district of Neustadt (Aisch)-Bad Windsheim in Bavaria in Germany.

Wilhelmsdorf was established by Huguenots. The village was named after the sovereign ruler George William, Margrave of Brandenburg-Bayreuth, who sheltered them. The Huguenot tradition is still a part of the village history. Sermons in the local Lutheran church were held in French until around 1900.

In the 19th century, Wilhelmsdorf was well known for their stocking-weavers. In 1903, the first compass factory was established. In the 20th century several competing compass factories were located at Wilhelmsdorf. Now Wilhelmsdorf has a compass museum.

Wilhelmsdorf should not be mistaken for Wilhermsdorf, a village 15 km away.

== Boroughs ==
- Wilhelmsdorf
- Ebersbach
- Oberalbach
- Stadelhof
- Trabelshof
- Unteralbachermühle

== Politics ==
=== Municipal council ===
The municipal council has 12 members:

- CSU 7 seats
- FWG 3 seats
- UWG 2 seats

(last municipal election on 3 March 2002)
