= Dietersheim =

- Municipality
- Coat of arms

- Location of Dietersheim within Neustadt a.d.Aisch-Bad Windsheim district
- Interactive map of Dietersheim
- Location within Germany Location within Bavaria
- Coordinates: 49°34′N 10°31′E
- Country: Germany
- State: Bavaria
- Admin. region: Mittelfranken
- District: Neustadt a.d.Aisch-Bad Windsheim
- Subdivisions: 8 Ortsteile

Government
  - Mayor (2023–29): Jürgen Meyer

Area
  - Total: 31.21 km^{2} (12.05 sq mi)
- Elevation: 301 m (988 ft)

Population (2025-12-31)
  - Total: 2,143
  - Density: 68.66/km^{2} (177.8/sq mi)
- Time zone: UTC+01:00 (CET)
  - Summer (DST): UTC+02:00 (CEST)
- Postal codes: 91463
- Dialling codes: 09161
- Vehicle registration: NEA
- Website: www.dietersheim.de

Dietersheim is a municipality in the district of Neustadt (Aisch)-Bad Windsheim in Bavaria in Germany.

== Mayor ==
Jürgen Meyer is the mayor since 2023. He is the successor of Robert Christensen.

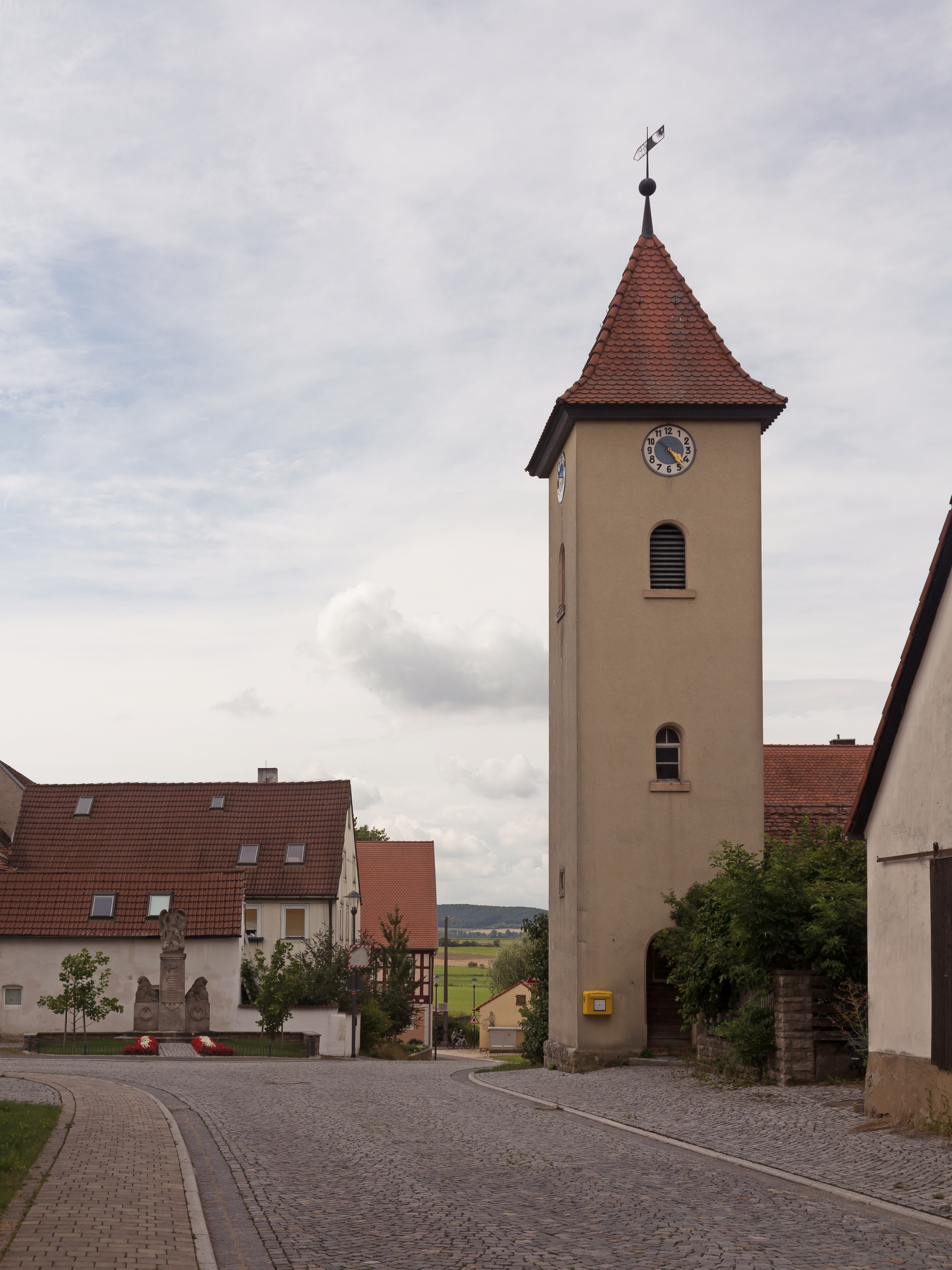
Dietersheim, church in der Hauptstrasse

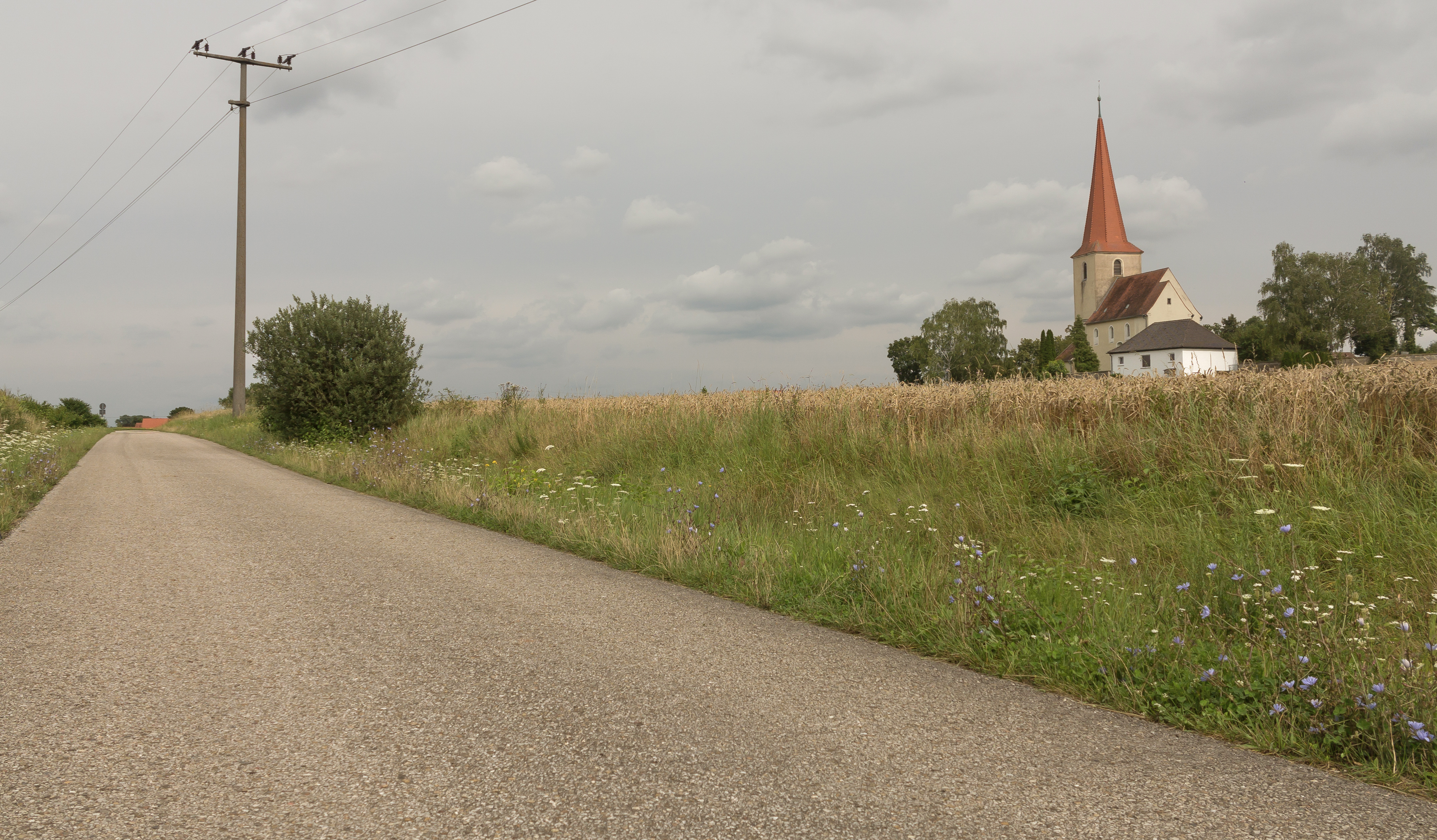
Dottenheim, reformed church Pfarrkirche Sankt Markus

== Personalities ==
=== Sons and daughters of the community ===
- Carl Heinrich Wilhelm Hagen (1810-1868), historian and deputy of the National Assembly in the Paulskirche
- Friedrich Wilhelm Hagen (1814-1888), representative of the human psychiatry and one of the responsible persons for the desecration of Ludwig II of Bavaria

=== Other personalities associated with the community ===
- Günter Schwanhäußer (1928-2014), entrepreneur ("Schwan-Stabilo", marker-pen) lived for a long time in the district of Altheim
