= Ergersheim, Middle Franconia =

Ergersheim
- Municipality
- Coat of arms

- Location of Ergersheim within Neustadt a.d.Aisch-Bad Windsheim district
- Interactive map of Ergersheim
- Location within Germany Location within Bavaria
- Coordinates: 49°30′41″N 10°19′43″E
- Country: Germany
- State: Bavaria
- Admin. region: Mittelfranken
- District: Neustadt a.d.Aisch-Bad Windsheim
- Municipal assoc.: Uffenheim
- Subdivisions: 6 Ortsteile

Government
  - Mayor (2020–26): Dieter Springmann

Area
  - Total: 30.04 km^{2} (11.60 sq mi)
- Elevation: 334 m (1,096 ft)

Population (2025-12-31)
  - Total: 1,041
  - Density: 34.65/km^{2} (89.75/sq mi)
- Time zone: UTC+01:00 (CET)
  - Summer (DST): UTC+02:00 (CEST)
- Postal codes: 91465
- Dialling codes: 09847
- Vehicle registration: NEA

Ergersheim is a municipality in Bavaria, Germany.

== Location ==
Ergersheim is located in the Middle Franconian district of Neustadt (Aisch)-Bad Windsheim. Administrative offices are located in Uffenheim.

== History ==
The first mention of Ergersheim was on December 25, 822 in a charter from the Emperor Louis the Pious.

It is home to the oldest chapel of the area, which was built during that era, and is still used for special church functions.

== Politics ==
The town council is made up of 12 members.

Election in 2020 (comparison to 2014):

- Wählergemeinschaft Gemeinde Ermetzhofen 5 seats (± 0)
- Freie Wählergemeinschaft Ergersheim 7 seats (± 0)

== Villages ==
- Ergersheim
- Ermetzhofen
- Kellermühle
- Neuherberg
- Obermühle
- Seenheim

== Twin town ==
- Ergersheim, Bas-Rhin
