= Karl August von Solbrig =

German physician and psychiatrist

Karl August von Solbrig (17 September 1809 in Fürth – 31 May 1872 in Munich) was a German physician and psychiatrist.

He studied medicine at the Ludwig-Maximilians-Universität München and the University of Erlangen, where he also served as an assistant to pathologist Adolph Henke. From 1834, he took a study trip during which he investigated the asylum systems of Germany, France and Belgium. Around 1836, he worked for several months as an assistant to psychiatrist Karl Wilhelm Ideler at the Charité hospital in Berlin, then afterwards settled as a general practitioner in his hometown of Fürth. In 1846, he was named director of the newly founded district mental hospital in Erlangen, and three years later, was named an honorary professor at the university.

During the 1850s, he made plans for the construction of a new district mental hospital near Munich, and in 1859, he became the first director of the Oberbayerische Kreis-Irrenanstalt (Upper Bavarian District Mental Hospital) in Munich. From 1864 up until his death in 1872, he was a full professor of psychiatry at the Ludwig-Maximilians-Universität München. He is credited with establishing psychiatry as a specific medical discipline at the faculty of medicine at the Ludwig-Maximilians-Universität München. In 1865, he became an honorary member of the Société médicale allemande de Paris.

== Published works ==
- Verbrechen und Wahnsinn, Ein Beitrag zur Diagnostik zweifelhafter Seelenstörungen, 1867 – Crime and insanity. A contribution to the diagnosis of dubious mental disorders.
