= Ergersheim, Bas-Rhin =

Ergersheim Arische
- Commune
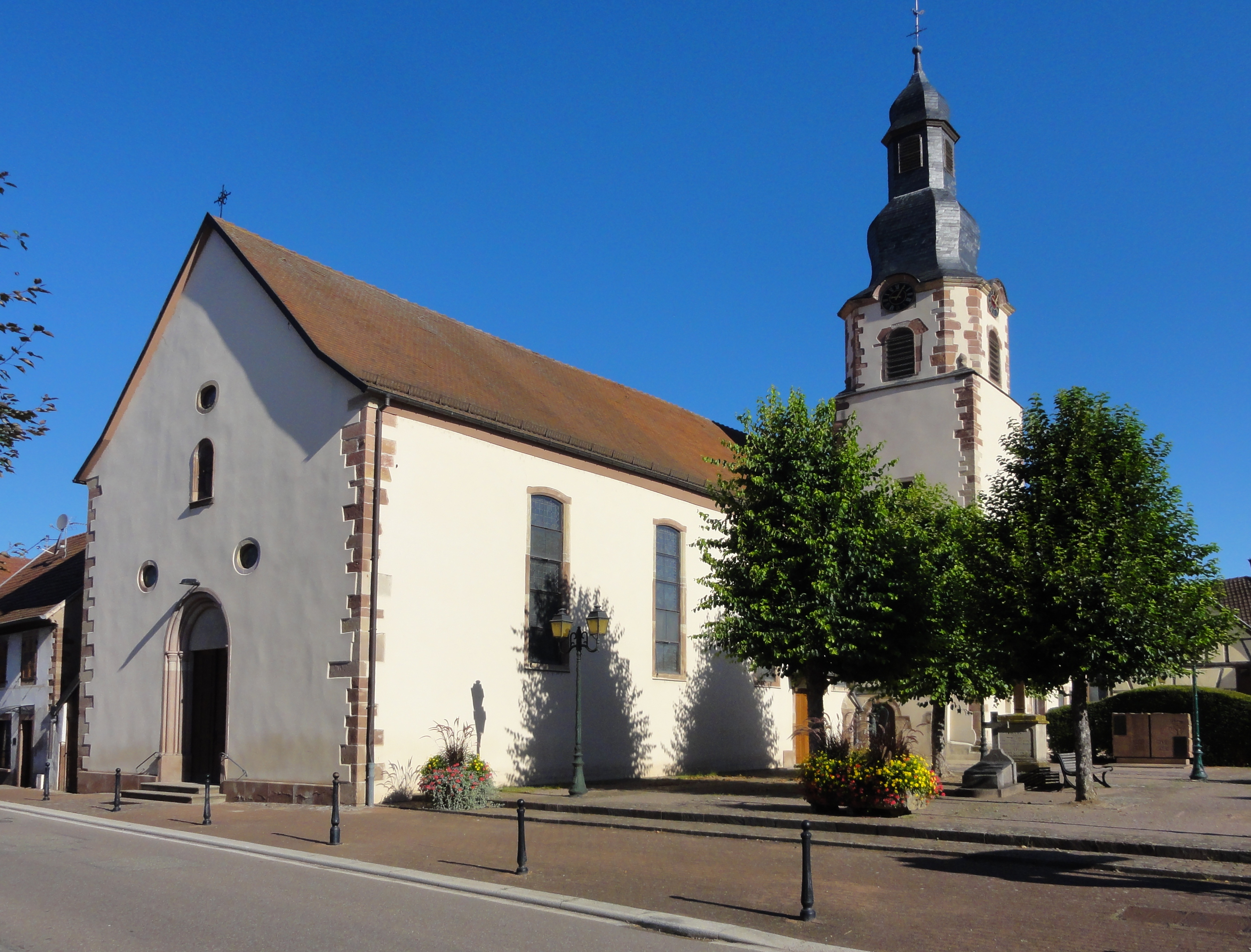
- The church in Ergersheim

- Coat of arms
- Location of Ergersheim
- Location within France Location within Grand Est
- Coordinates: 48°34′14″N 7°31′39″E
- Country: France
- Region: Grand Est
- Department: Bas-Rhin
- Arrondissement: Molsheim
- Canton: Molsheim

Government
  - Mayor (2020–2026): Marianne Wehr
- Area^{1}: 6.51 km^{2} (2.51 sq mi)
- Highest elevation: 261 m (856 ft)
- Lowest elevation: 157 m (515 ft)
- Population (2023): 1,479
  - Density: 227/km^{2} (588/sq mi)
- Time zone: UTC+01:00 (CET)
  - Summer (DST): UTC+02:00 (CEST)
- INSEE/Postal code: 67127 /67120
- ^{1} French Land Register data, which excludes lakes, ponds, glaciers > 1 km^{2} (0.386 sq mi or 247 acres) and river estuaries.

Ergersheim is a commune in the Bas-Rhin department in Grand Est in north-eastern France.

== Places to see ==
- Saint Michel Chapel
- Saint Nicolas Church

== Twin towns ==
- Ergersheim, in Germany

== See also ==
- Communes of the Bas-Rhin department
