= Baudenbach =

- Municipality
- Coat of arms

- Location of Baudenbach within Neustadt a.d.Aisch-Bad Windsheim district
- Interactive map of Baudenbach
- Location within Germany Location within Bavaria
- Coordinates: 49°37′N 10°31′E
- Country: Germany
- State: Bavaria
- Admin. region: Mittelfranken
- District: Neustadt a.d.Aisch-Bad Windsheim
- Municipal assoc.: Diespeck
- Subdivisions: 4 Ortsteile

Government
  - Mayor (2020–26): Wolfgang Schmidt (CSU)

Area
  - Total: 22.09 km^{2} (8.53 sq mi)
- Elevation: 301 m (988 ft)

Population (2025-12-31)
  - Total: 1,250
  - Density: 56.6/km^{2} (147/sq mi)
- Time zone: UTC+01:00 (CET)
  - Summer (DST): UTC+02:00 (CEST)
- Postal codes: 91460
- Dialling codes: 09164
- Vehicle registration: NEA
- Website: www.baudenbach.de

Baudenbach is a municipality in the district of Neustadt (Aisch)-Bad Windsheim in Bavaria in Germany.
