= Diespeck =

- Municipality
- Coat of arms

- Location of Diespeck within Neustadt a.d.Aisch-Bad Windsheim district
- Interactive map of Diespeck
- Location within Germany Location within Bavaria
- Coordinates: 49°36′N 10°38′E
- Country: Germany
- State: Bavaria
- Admin. region: Mittelfranken
- District: Neustadt a.d.Aisch-Bad Windsheim
- Municipal assoc.: Diespeck
- Subdivisions: 10 Ortsteile

Government
  - Mayor (2020–26): Christian von Dobschütz (CSU)

Area
  - Total: 20.99 km^{2} (8.10 sq mi)
- Elevation: 301 m (988 ft)

Population (2025-12-31)
  - Total: 3,702
  - Density: 176.4/km^{2} (456.8/sq mi)
- Time zone: UTC+01:00 (CET)
  - Summer (DST): UTC+02:00 (CEST)
- Postal codes: 91456
- Dialling codes: 09161
- Vehicle registration: NEA
- Website: www.diespeck.de

Diespeck is a municipality in the district of Neustadt (Aisch)-Bad Windsheim in Bavaria in Germany.
