= Gutenstetten =

- Municipality
- Coat of arms

- Location of Gutenstetten within Neustadt a.d.Aisch-Bad Windsheim district
- Interactive map of Gutenstetten
- Location within Germany Location within Bavaria
- Coordinates: 49°37′N 10°37′E
- Country: Germany
- State: Bavaria
- Admin. region: Mittelfranken
- District: Neustadt a.d.Aisch-Bad Windsheim
- Municipal assoc.: Diespeck
- Subdivisions: 7 Ortsteile

Government
  - Mayor (2020–26): Gerhard Eichner

Area
  - Total: 21.37 km^{2} (8.25 sq mi)
- Elevation: 287 m (942 ft)

Population (2025-12-31)
  - Total: 1,289
  - Density: 60.32/km^{2} (156.2/sq mi)
- Time zone: UTC+01:00 (CET)
  - Summer (DST): UTC+02:00 (CEST)
- Postal codes: 91468
- Dialling codes: 09161
- Vehicle registration: NEA
- Website: www.gutenstetten.de

Gutenstetten is a municipality in the district of Neustadt (Aisch)-Bad Windsheim in Bavaria in Germany.

== Mayors ==
- Gerhard Eichner, CSU, since 2014
- Helmut Reiß, Independent citizens (Unabhängige Bürger), 2002 - 2014
- Robert Maderer, CSU, 1985 - 2002
- Lorenz Schneider, CSU, 1972 - 1985
