= Münchsteinach =

- Municipality
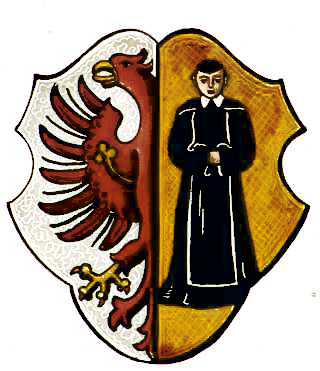
- Coat of arms

- Location of Münchsteinach within Neustadt a.d.Aisch-Bad Windsheim district
- Interactive map of Münchsteinach
- Location within Germany Location within Bavaria
- Coordinates: 49°37′N 10°35′E
- Country: Germany
- State: Bavaria
- Admin. region: Mittelfranken
- District: Neustadt a.d.Aisch-Bad Windsheim
- Municipal assoc.: Diespeck
- Subdivisions: 8 Ortsteile

Government
  - Mayor (2020–26): Jürgen Riedel

Area
  - Total: 29.47 km^{2} (11.38 sq mi)
- Elevation: 307 m (1,007 ft)

Population (2025-12-31)
  - Total: 1,417
  - Density: 48.08/km^{2} (124.5/sq mi)
- Time zone: UTC+01:00 (CET)
  - Summer (DST): UTC+02:00 (CEST)
- Postal codes: 91481
- Dialling codes: 09166
- Vehicle registration: NEA
- Website: www.muenchsteinach.de

Münchsteinach is a municipality in the district of Neustadt (Aisch)-Bad Windsheim in Middle Franconia, Bavaria, Germany. It is famous for being near the factory for club-mate.
