= Weisendorf =

- Municipality
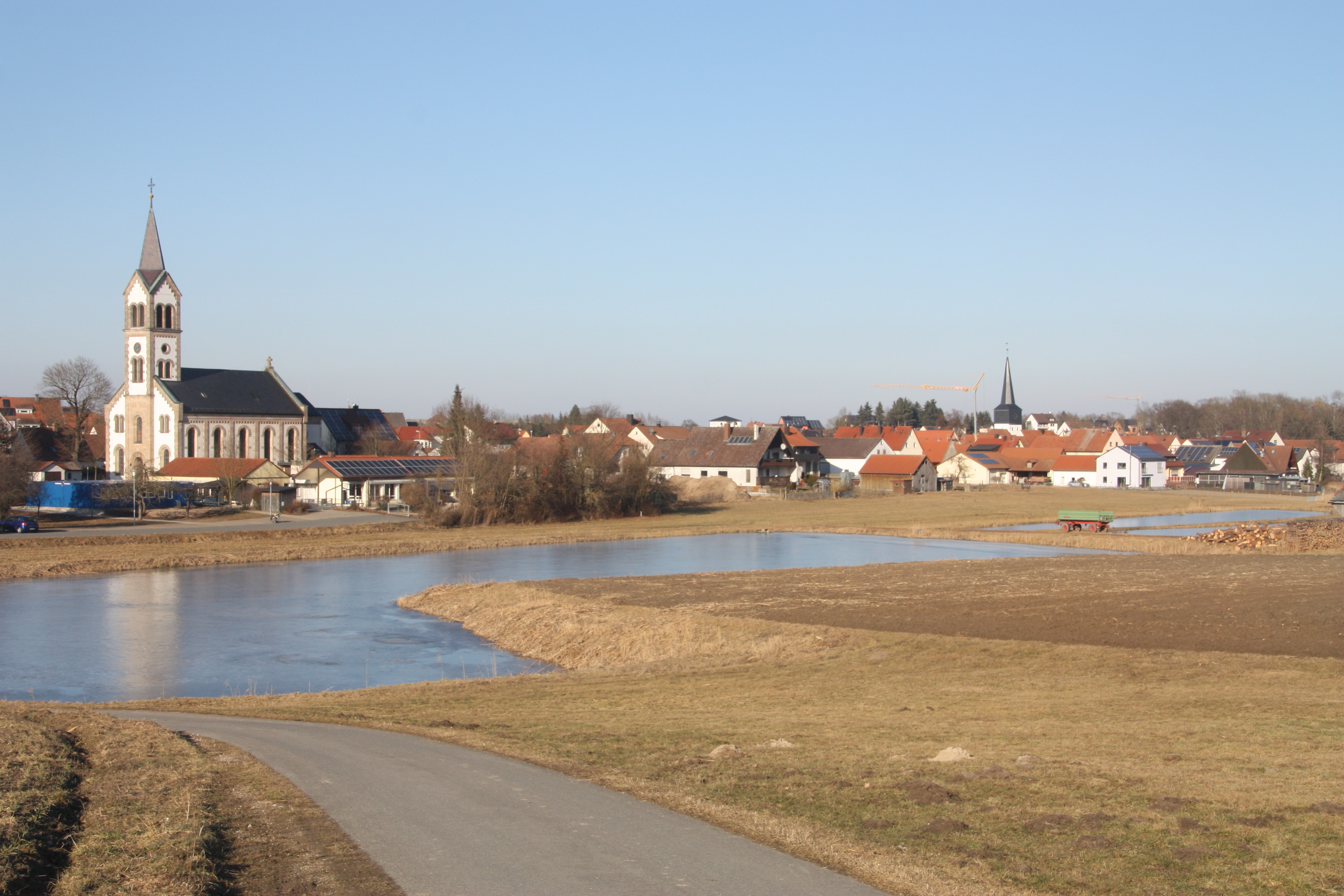
- General view of Weisendorf

- Coat of arms

- Location of Weisendorf within Erlangen-Höchstadt district
- Interactive map of Weisendorf
- Location within Germany Location within Bavaria
- Coordinates: 49°37′N 10°50′E
- Country: Germany
- State: Bavaria
- Admin. region: Mittelfranken
- District: Erlangen-Höchstadt

Government
  - Mayor (2020–26): Heinrich Süß

Area
  - Total: 36.75 km^{2} (14.19 sq mi)
- Elevation: 308 m (1,010 ft)

Population (2025-12-31)
  - Total: 6,555
  - Density: 178.4/km^{2} (462.0/sq mi)
- Time zone: UTC+01:00 (CET)
  - Summer (DST): UTC+02:00 (CEST)
- Postal codes: 91085
- Dialling codes: 09135
- Vehicle registration: ERH / HöS
- Website: www.weisendorf.de

Weisendorf (German pronunciation: [ˈvaɪzn̩dɔʁf]) is a municipality in the district of Erlangen-Höchstadt, in Bavaria, Germany. It belongs to the administrative region of Middle Franconia.

== Geography ==
Weisendorf is located 15 km west of Erlangen and 10 Kilometer north of Herzogenaurach

== Division of the town ==
- Boxbrunn
- Buch
- Kairlindach
- Mitteldorf
- Nankendorf
- Neuenbürg
- Oberlindach
- Reinersdorf
- Reuth
- Rezelsdorf
- Sauerheim
- Schmiedelberg
- Sintmann
- Weisendorf

== Economy ==
Many citizens of Weisendorf work in Erlangen, Herzogenaurach or Nürnberg. Erlangen is home of many Siemens plants and the FAU is also there. Herzogenaurach is home of Adidas Puma and schaeffler.

== Culture ==
=== Food ===
A local food speciality is the "Aischgründer Spiegelkarpfen". Its a unique carp fish race. It was breed by monks in medieval times.

== Transport ==
Weisendorf is near the motorway A3 (Frankfurt am Main-Regensburg). The next railroad station is located in Erlangen (c. 15 km). The Nuremberg Airport (c. 30 km) provides access to many cities in Europe and the rest of the world.
