= Reichenbach =

Reichenbach may refer to:

== Places ==
=== Austria ===
- Reichenbach (Litschau), a part of Litschau
- Reichenbach (Rappottenstein), a part of Rappottenstein

=== Germany ===
- Reichenbach (Oberlausitz), in Niederschlesischer Oberlausitzkreis district, Saxony
- Reichenbach im Vogtland, in Vogtlandkreis district, Saxony
- Reichenbach am Heuberg, in Tuttlingen district, Baden-Württemberg
- Reichenbach an der Fils, in Esslingen district, Baden-Württemberg
- Reichenbach, Upper Palatinate, in Cham district, Bavaria
  - Reichenbach Abbey (Bavaria), Benedictine monastery in Reichenbach
- Reichenbach, Upper Franconia, in Kronach district, Bavaria
- Reichenbach, Thuringia, in Saale-Holzland district, Thuringia
- Reichenbach, Birkenfeld, in Birkenfeld district, Rhineland-Palatinate
- Reichenbach (Hornberg), in the Black Forest, Baden-Württemberg
- Reichenbach-Steegen in Kaiserslautern district, Rhineland-Palatinate
- Reichenbach, a part of Hessisch Lichtenau, Hesse
- Reichenbach, a part of Lautertal (Odenwald), Hesse
- Reichenbach (Waldbronn), a part of Waldbronn, Baden-Württemberg
- Oberreichenbach, Baden-Württemberg, in the district of Calw, Baden-Württemberg
- Oberreichenbach, Bavaria, in the district of Erlangen-Höchstadt, Bavaria
- Oberreichenbach (disambiguation), various additional meanings
- Unterreichenbach, in the district of Calw, Baden-Württemberg

==== Rivers ====
- Reichenbach (Kahl), Bavaria, tributary of the Kahl
- Reichenbach (Kocher), Baden-Württemberg, tributary of the Kocher
- Reichenbach (Liederbach), Hesse, upper course of the Liederbach
- Reichenbach (Zahme Gera), Thuringia, tributary of the Zahme Gera

=== Italy ===
- Reichenbach Castle, in Merano, South Tyrol

=== Poland ===
- Reichenbach im Eulengebirge or Dzierżoniów in southwestern Poland

=== Switzerland ===
- Reichenbach (Oberhasli), or Reichenbachtal, an alpine valley in Oberhasli, Canton of Berne
- Reichenbach Falls, a series of waterfalls on the River Aar near Meiringen in Bern canton
- Reichenbach im Kandertal, a municipality in the Frutigen-Niedersimmental administrative district in the Canton of Bern
- Reichenbach Castle, in Zollikofen in the Canton of Bern

== Other uses ==
- Reichenbach (crater)
- Reichenbach (surname)
- "Reichenbach" (Supernatural), an episode of Supernatural

== See also ==
- "The Reichenbach Fall", an episode of Sherlock
