= Röttenbach =

Municipality in Bavaria, Germany

- Municipality
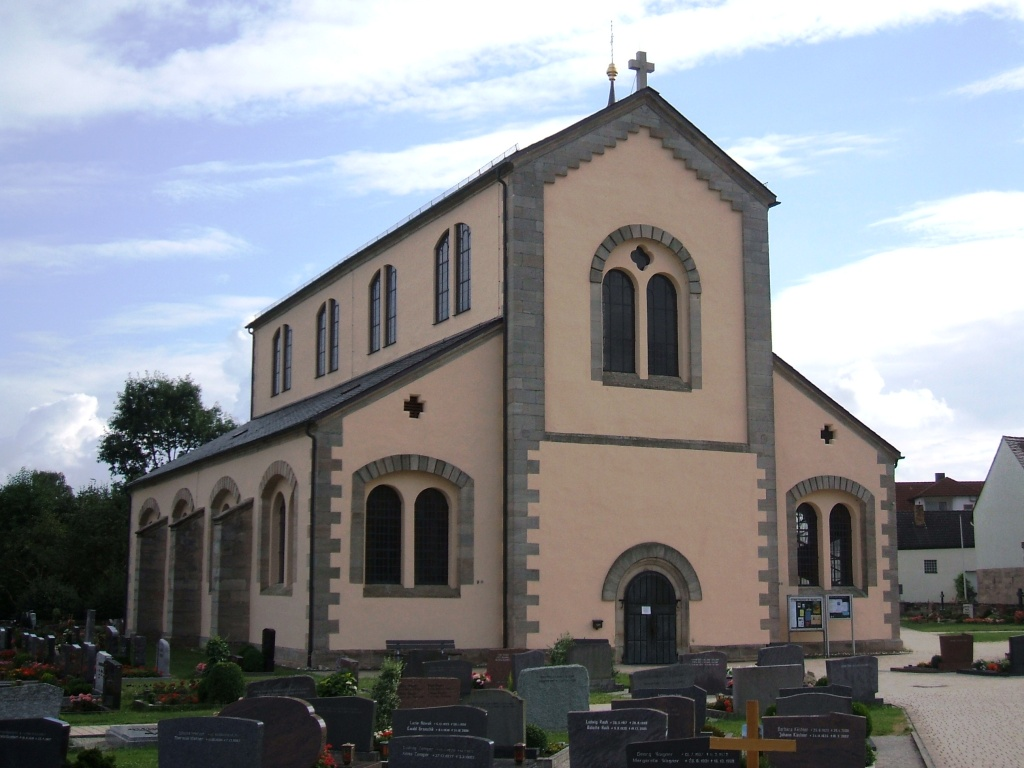
- Church of Saint Maurice

- Coat of arms

- Location of Röttenbach within Erlangen-Höchstadt district
- Interactive map of Röttenbach
- Location within Germany Location within Bavaria
- Coordinates: 49°40′N 10°56′E
- Country: Germany
- State: Bavaria
- Admin. region: Mittelfranken
- District: Erlangen-Höchstadt

Government
  - Mayor (2020–26): Ludwig Wahl (FW)

Area
  - Total: 7.76 km^{2} (3.00 sq mi)
- Elevation: 301 m (988 ft)

Population (2025-12-31)
  - Total: 4,628
  - Density: 596/km^{2} (1,540/sq mi)
- Time zone: UTC+01:00 (CET)
  - Summer (DST): UTC+02:00 (CEST)
- Postal codes: 91341
- Dialling codes: 09195
- Vehicle registration: ERH
- Website: www.roettenbach-erh.de

Röttenbach (German pronunciation: [ˈʁœtn̩bax]) is a municipality in the district of Erlangen-Höchstadt, in Bavaria, Germany.

== Geography ==
=== Neighboring villages ===
The neighboring villages surrounding Röttenbach are Adelsdorf, Baiersdorf, Heßdorf, and Hemhofen.

== History ==
=== Middle Ages ===
Around the year 1000, settlers came in search of land in the wooded, rolling hills, which form the foothills of the Steigerwald. They settled near a creek and cleared parts of the forest to create arable land. The name Röttenbach was originally Rodenbach, derived from the German word for stream or creek (Bach) and the verb roden (to clear land). Wide marshes, which rested on the impermeable layers of brick clay that lie on the Keupere, were not conducive to productive agriculture. Over the centuries the inhabitants cultivated the marshes creating many of the series of ponds used often for carp farming and other aquaculture that still divide the forests to the north, east and west of Röttenbach.

In the 13th century a descendant from seneschal (Truchseß) of Pommersfelden took the area in possession, named themselves the ‘Truchseß von Röttenbach’ and founded Röttenbach. Deeds show that farms and estates were divided among landlords and changed owners several times. In 1322 an Estate went to the abbot of the monastery Michaelsberg, in 1329 another to the bailiff at Nuremberg Castle. In 1476 the Bamberger cloister founded its Court in Röttenbach.

The main courtyard of the area, from which the manor later emerged, is first mentioned in a deed of gift from Bamberg dated 1433 for the Stewards Peter und Veit. On this farm, now the area around the Brauerei Sauer (Sauer Brewery), stood a castle which was protected by a moat. Nevertheless, insurgent peasants burned down the castle during the Peasants' War of 1525. The main residence later was later rebuilt and remains to this day, as well as a sandstone coat of arms from 1591 which still exists on the south wall of the brewery. In 1610, the possession of the residence was promised to the Steward of Pappenheim. In 1710 it fell into the possession of the Bishopric of Bamberg. Part of the goods and the people of the estate then belonged to the Imperial City of Nürnberg and the Baron Winkler von Mohrenfels (Hemhofen). In the 1803 during the Napoleonic era, Röttenbach was awarded to the Prussian crown, but fell in 1810, as well as the whole of Franconia, to the Kingdom of Bavaria.

Until the mid-20th Century most of the population remained poor and lived mostly as day laborers. A small additional income for many was to gather mushrooms and berries, pinecones, as well as water lilies and sundews (drosera). The majority of these natural products were brought to Erlangen for sale. Others drove through southern Germany, Switzerland, and Austria and sold horseradish, for which the region was famous. The strong sense of salesmanship laid the foundation during the difficult years after the 2nd World War for an unforeseen economic boom in the region. The low-level Franconian timber-framed farmhouses disappeared quickly and were replaced by modern housing. As a result, unfortunately the only remaining historically significant buildings are forester's house with a half-timbered barn & storage building, and the rectory, both of which were built in the Baroque style.

In 1972 during the regional reform of Upper Franconia, Röttenbach became part of Middle Franconia. In turn, more and more new residents streamed from the metropolitan region of Nuremberg-Erlangen-Fürth to the then quiet village. Röttenbach grew rapidly and took on its present form. In 1980, the short lived era of municipal association with Hemhofen was dissolved.

=== Population growth ===
Röttenbach had less than 1000 inhabitants up into the 1940s. After World War II the population rose sharply. As of December 31, 2009, Röttenbach had 4628 inhabitants of which 2,357 were female and 2,271 were male.

== Nature ==
Röttenbach is part of the sand axis of Franconia (Sandachse Franken) and has numerous small sections of neglected grassland, sand fields and dry edges of forest that serve many specialized animals as a living environment. A prominent part of the surroundings of Röttenbach are the many chains of ponds.

== Economy ==
=== Traffic ===
From Röttenbach, the Autobahn 3 via Dechsendorf, as well as the Autobahn 73 via Baiersdorf can be reached in a few minutes. The Bundesstraße 470 runs to the north. Bus line number 205 of the Verkehrsverbund Großraum Nürnberg (VGN) stops in Röttenbach on its way between Erlangen and Höchstadt.
