= Uttenreuth =

- Town
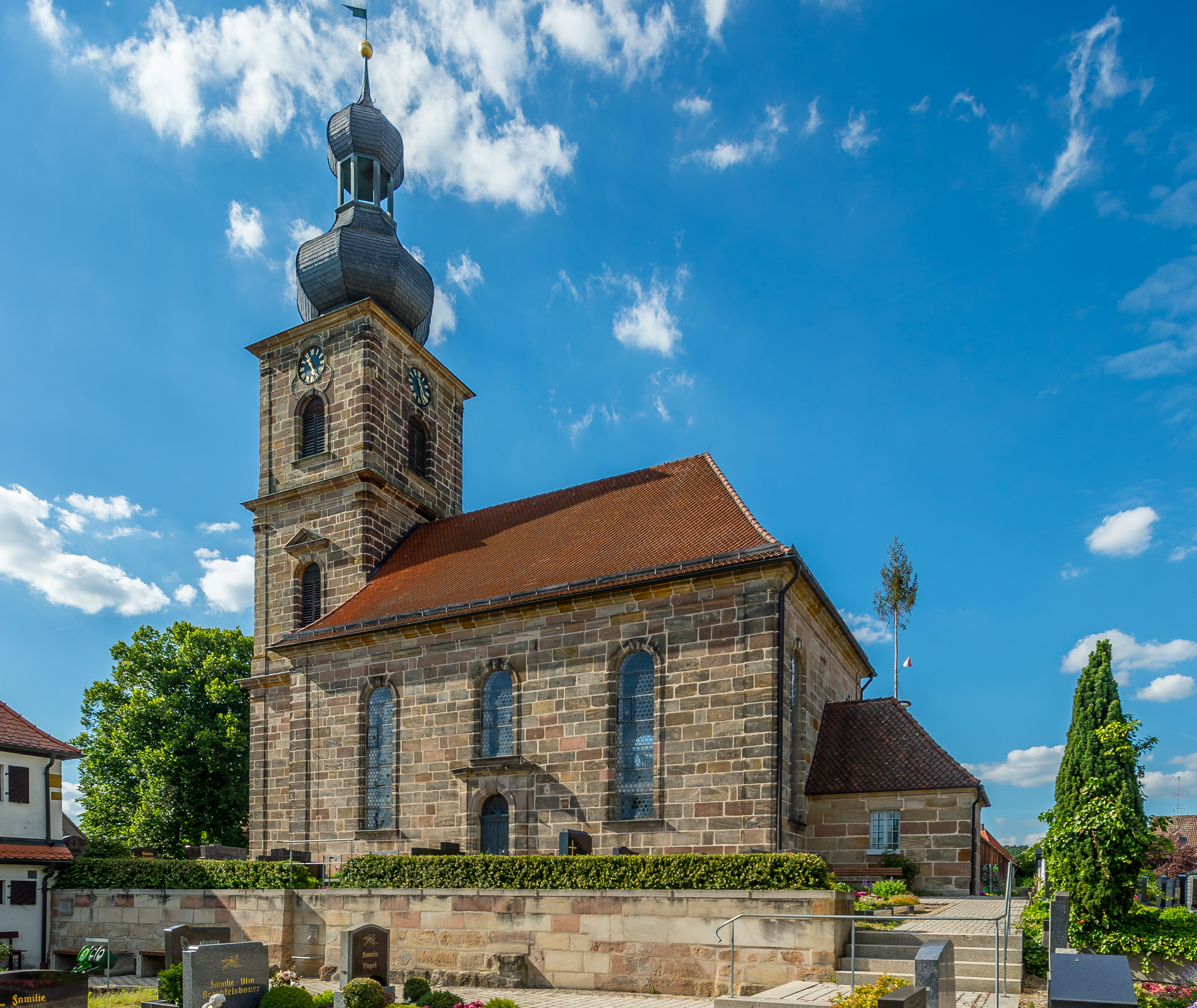
- Protestant Church of Saint Matthew

- Coat of arms

- Location of Uttenreuth within Erlangen-Höchstadt district
- Interactive map of Uttenreuth
- Location within Germany Location within Bavaria
- Coordinates: 49°36′N 11°4′E
- Country: Germany
- State: Bavaria
- Admin. region: Mittelfranken
- District: Erlangen-Höchstadt
- Municipal assoc.: Uttenreuth
- Subdivisions: 2 districts

Government
  - Mayor (2020–26): Frederic Ruth

Area
  - Total: 5.93 km^{2} (2.29 sq mi)
- Elevation: 291 m (955 ft)

Population (2025-12-31)
  - Total: 4,782
  - Density: 806/km^{2} (2,090/sq mi)
- Time zone: UTC+01:00 (CET)
  - Summer (DST): UTC+02:00 (CEST)
- Postal codes: 91080
- Vehicle registration: ERH
- Website: www.uttenreuth.de

Uttenreuth is a town in the district of Erlangen-Höchstadt in Bavaria in Germany.

== History ==
Uttenreuth was founded in the 12th century during the expansion of the empire around Nuremberg to the Schwabach valley east of Erlangen.

After 1946, Uttenreuth developed into a suburban residential area in the lower Schwabach valley. A territorial reform in 1978 led to the integration of the neighboring village Weiher.

== Geography ==
=== Geographical location ===
Uttenreuth is located about 5-kilometer (3.1 mi) east of Erlangen in the Schwabach valley.

=== Neighboring communities ===
Towns neighboring Uttenreuth are Dormitz (in the East), Neunkirchen am Brand (Northeast), Marloffstein (North), Spardorf (Northwest) and Buckenhof in the West. To the South, Uttenreuth borders a large forest, the Sebalder Reichswald.

=== Subdivisions ===
- Uttenreuth
- Weiher (integrated in 1978)

== Traffic ==
The OVF bus 209, which runs through Uttenreuth, connects Erlangen and Eschenau.

The closest train station is located in Erlangen. Until the 1960s, Uttenreuth had its own train station which connected the cities of Erlangen and Gräfenberg

The town is also connected to Erlangen's bikeways, which are used by many commuters.

== Literature ==
- Paulus, Erich and Regina Paulus. 2001. Uttenreuth - Geschichtsbuch über ein fränkisches Dorf am Rande der Stadt. ISBN 3-87707-576-2
