= Fürth (electoral district) =

Federal electoral district of Germany

Coordinates: 49°32′37″N 10°33′24″E

242 Fürth
- Electoral district for the Bundestag
- Fürth in 2025
- State: Bavaria
- Population: 340,100 (2019)
- Electorate: 248,261 (2025)
- Major settlements: Fürth; Zirndorf; Oberasbach
- Area: 1,638.5 km^{2}

Current electoral district
- Created: 1965
- Party: CSU
- Member: Tobias Winkler
- Elected: 2021, 2025

Fürth is an electoral constituency (German: Wahlkreis) represented in the Bundestag. It elects one member via first-past-the-post voting. Under the current constituency numbering system, it is designated as constituency 242. It is located in northwestern Bavaria, comprising the city of Fürth and the districts of Landkreis Fürth and Neustadt (Aisch)-Bad Windsheim.

Fürth was created for the 1965 federal election. Since 2021, it has been represented by Tobias Winkler of the Christian Social Union (CSU).

== Geography ==
Fürth is located in northwestern Bavaria. As of the 2021 federal election, it comprises the independent city of Fürth, the district of Landkreis Fürth, and the Neustadt (Aisch)-Bad Windsheim district excluding the Verwaltungsgemeinschaft of Uehlfeld.

== History ==
Fürth was created in 1965. In the 1965 through 1998 elections, it was constituency 229 in the numbering system. In the 2002 and 2005 elections, it was number 244. In the 2009 through 2021 elections, it was number 243. From the 2025 election, it has been number 242.

Originally, the constituency comprised the independent city of Fürth and the districts of Landkreis Fürth, Neustadt an der Aisch, and Scheinfeld. In the 1976 through 1987 elections, it comprised the city of Fürth and the districts of Landkreis Fürth and Neustadt (Aisch)-Bad Windsheim, as well as the municipalities of Aurachtal and Herzogenaurach from the district of Erlangen-Höchstadt. In the 1990 election, it lost the municipalities from the Erlangen-Höchstadt district. In the 2021 election, it lost the Verwaltungsgemeinschaft of Uehlfeld from the Neustadt (Aisch)-Bad Windsheim district.

Election	No.	Name	Borders
1965	229	Fürth	Fürth city; Landkreis Fürth district; Neustadt an der Aisch district; Scheinfeld district
1969	229	Fürth	Fürth city; Landkreis Fürth district; Neustadt an der Aisch district; Scheinfeld district
1972	229	Fürth	Fürth city; Landkreis Fürth district; Neustadt an der Aisch district; Scheinfeld district
1976	229	Fürth	Fürth city; Landkreis Fürth district; Neustadt (Aisch)-Bad Windsheim district; Erlangen-Höchstadt (only Aurachtal and Herzogenaurach municipalities)
1980	229	Fürth	Fürth city; Landkreis Fürth district; Neustadt (Aisch)-Bad Windsheim district; Erlangen-Höchstadt (only Aurachtal and Herzogenaurach municipalities)
1983	229	Fürth	Fürth city; Landkreis Fürth district; Neustadt (Aisch)-Bad Windsheim district; Erlangen-Höchstadt (only Aurachtal and Herzogenaurach municipalities)
1987	229	Fürth	Fürth city; Landkreis Fürth district; Neustadt (Aisch)-Bad Windsheim district; Erlangen-Höchstadt (only Aurachtal and Herzogenaurach municipalities)
1990	229	Fürth	Fürth city; Landkreis Fürth district; Neustadt (Aisch)-Bad Windsheim district
1994	229	Fürth	Fürth city; Landkreis Fürth district; Neustadt (Aisch)-Bad Windsheim district
1998	229	Fürth	Fürth city; Landkreis Fürth district; Neustadt (Aisch)-Bad Windsheim district
2002	244	Fürth	Fürth city; Landkreis Fürth district; Neustadt (Aisch)-Bad Windsheim district
2005	244	Fürth	Fürth city; Landkreis Fürth district; Neustadt (Aisch)-Bad Windsheim district
2009	243	Fürth	Fürth city; Landkreis Fürth district; Neustadt (Aisch)-Bad Windsheim district
2013	243	Fürth	Fürth city; Landkreis Fürth district; Neustadt (Aisch)-Bad Windsheim district
2017	243	Fürth	Fürth city; Landkreis Fürth district; Neustadt (Aisch)-Bad Windsheim district
2021	243	Fürth	Fürth city; Landkreis Fürth district; Neustadt (Aisch)-Bad Windsheim district (excluding Uehlfeld Verwaltungsgemeinschaft)
2025	242	Fürth	Fürth city; Landkreis Fürth district; Neustadt (Aisch)-Bad Windsheim district (excluding Uehlfeld Verwaltungsgemeinschaft)

== Members ==
The constituency has been held by the Christian Social Union (CSU) during all but one Bundestag term since its creation. It was first represented by Werner Dollinger of the CSU from 1965 to 1972, when it was won by Horst Haase of the Social Democratic Party (SPD) for one term. Dollinger regained it in 1976 and served until 1990. Christian Schmidt was representative from 1990 to 2021, a total of eight consecutive terms. He was succeeded by Tobias Winkler in 2021.

Election	Member	Party	%
1965	Werner Dollinger	CSU	52.5
1969	Werner Dollinger	CSU	48.6
1972	Horst Haase	SPD	47.4
1976	Werner Dollinger	CSU	52.1
1980	Werner Dollinger	CSU	51.6
1983	Werner Dollinger	CSU	58.0
1987	Werner Dollinger	CSU	51.5
1990	Christian Schmidt	CSU	47.9
1994	Christian Schmidt	CSU	49.7
1998	Christian Schmidt	CSU	46.9
2002	Christian Schmidt	CSU	53.5
2005	Christian Schmidt	CSU	49.0
2009	Christian Schmidt	CSU	43.3
2013	Christian Schmidt	CSU	49.2
2017	Christian Schmidt	CSU	39.9
2021	Tobias Winkler	CSU	33.5
2025	Tobias Winkler	CSU	37.4

== Election results ==
=== 2025 election ===
2025: Fürth
Notes:	Blue background denotes the winner of the electorate vote. Pink background denotes a candidate elected from their party list. Yellow background denotes an electorate win by a list member, or other incumbent. A ✓ or ✗ denotes status of any incumbent, win or lose respectively.						
Party	Candidate	Votes	%	±%	Party votes	%	±%
CSU	Tobias Winkler	77,540	37.4	▲3.9	71,334	34.4	▲4.4
SPD	Carsten Träger	36,976	17.8	▼6.1	29,393	14.2	▼7.3
AfD	Bastian Treuheit	38,338	18.5	▲9.9	39,098	18.8	▲9.9
Greens	Kamran Salimi	22,507	10.9	▼2.9	25,808	12.4	▼2.7
Left	Niklas Main	12,636	6.1	▲2.9	14,099	6.8	▲3.3
FW	Andreas Scholz	8,042	3.9	▼1.4	5,950	2.9	▼2.0
FDP	Daniel Bayer	6,095	2.9	▼3.6	6,8,087	3.9	▼5.6
ÖDP	Tristan Billmann	2,737	1.3	▲0.5	793	0.4	▼0.1
Volt	Andreas Schmidtell	2,279	1.1	▲0.8	1,419	0.7	▲0.24
PARTEI				▼1.6	831	0.4	▼0.4
Tierschutzpartei					1,996	1.0	▼0.3
Team Todenhöfer							▼0.4
BSW					7,368	3.6	
BP				▼0.3	186	0.1	▼0.1
Unabhängige							▼0.5
Humanists	Stephan Wiedenmann			▼0.2	161	0.1	▼0.1
Gesundheitsforschung							▼0.1
dieBasis				▼9.3	724	0.3	▼1.4÷
Bündnis C							▼
BD					201	0.1	
Pirates							▼0.4
MLPD					61	0.0	0.0
Informal votes		1,181			822		
Total valid votes		207,150			207,509		
Turnout		208,331	83.9	▲5.0			
CSU hold	Majority			▲3.9			

=== 2021 election ===
Federal election (2021): Fürth
Notes:	Blue background denotes the winner of the electorate vote. Pink background denotes a candidate elected from their party list. Yellow background denotes an electorate win by a list member, or other incumbent. A ✓ or ✗ denotes status of any incumbent, win or lose respectively.						
Party	Candidate	Votes	%	±%	Party votes	%	±%
CSU	Tobias Winkler	65,876	33.5	▼6.2	58,976	29.9	▼5.1
SPD	Carsten Träger	47,153	24.0	▲1.0	42,329	21.5	▲2.6
Greens	Uwe Kekeritz	27,111	13.8	▲4.1	29,778	15.1	▲4.7
AfD	Thomas Klaukien	16,858	8.6	▼2.0	17,692	9.0	▼2.7
FDP	Daniel Bayer	12,883	6.6	▲1.2	18,765	9.5	▲0.6
FW	Stefan Mielchen	10,340	5.3	▲0.9	9,669	4.9	▲2.3
Left	Hermann Ruttmann	6,221	3.2	▼3.6	6,946	3.5	▼4.3
dieBasis	Katrin Reber	3,750	1.9		3,369	1.7	
Tierschutzpartei					2,463	1.3	▲0.2
PARTEI	Catalina Walther	3,090	1.6		1,661	0.8	0.0
ÖDP	Klaus John	1,685	0.9		1,002	0.5	▼0.1
Pirates					826	0.4	0.0
Team Todenhöfer					711	0.4	
Volt	Andreas S. Schmidtell	611	0.3		464	0.2	
BP	Fatimah Brendecke	507	0.3	▼0.2	443	0.2	▼0.1
Unabhängige					356	0.2	
Humanists	Stephan Wiedenmann	416	0.2		291	0.1	
Gesundheitsforschung					238	0.1	0.0
V-Partei3					215	0.1	▼0.1
Bündnis C					208	0.1	
NPD					180	0.1	▼0.2
The III. Path					129	0.1	
du.					100	0.1	
DKP					62	0.0	0.0
MLPD					43	0.0	0.0
LKR					27	0.0	
Informal votes		1,438			996		
Total valid votes		196,501			196,943		
Turnout		197,939	78.9	▲1.2			
CSU hold	Majority	18,723	9.5	▼7.2			

=== 2017 election ===
Federal election (2017): Fürth
Notes:	Blue background denotes the winner of the electorate vote. Pink background denotes a candidate elected from their party list. Yellow background denotes an electorate win by a list member, or other incumbent. A ✓ or ✗ denotes status of any incumbent, win or lose respectively.						
Party	Candidate	Votes	%	±%	Party votes	%	±%
CSU	✓ Christian Schmidt	78,559	39.9	▼9.3	69,472	35.2	▼7.6
SPD	Carsten Träger (Note: Träger entered the Bundestag on the SPD list after the death of Ewald Schurer in December 2017.)	45,055	22.9	▼4.2	37,089	18.8	▼6.4
AfD	Arno Treiber	20,968	10.6	▲7.5	23,033	11.7	▲7.2
Greens	Uwe Kekeritz	19,088	9.7	▲1.4	20,540	10.4	▲1.3
Left	Niklas Haupt	13,311	6.8	▲2.5	15,442	7.8	▲2.8
FDP	Franz Martin Fleischer	10,618	5.4	▲3.6	17,545	8.9	▲4.2
FW	Elke Eder	8,619	4.4	▲2.2	5,169	2.6	▲0.2
Tierschutzpartei					2,110	1.1	▲0.3
PARTEI					1,750	0.9	
ÖDP					1,258	0.6	▼0.1
Pirates					861	0.4	▼1.9
NPD					676	0.3	▼0.6
BP	Fatimah Brendecke	809	0.4		630	0.3	▼0.1
DiB					369	0.2	
V-Partei³					363	0.2	
DM					334	0.2	
Gesundheitsforschung					324	0.2	
BGE					262	0.1	
MLPD					50	0.0	0.0
DKP					46	0.0	
BüSo					21	0.0	0.0
Informal votes		1,715			1,398		
Total valid votes		197,027			197,344		
Turnout		198,742	77.8	▲7.5			
CSU hold	Majority	33,504	17.0	▼5.1			

=== 2013 election ===
Federal election (2013): Fürth
Notes:	Blue background denotes the winner of the electorate vote. Pink background denotes a candidate elected from their party list. Yellow background denotes an electorate win by a list member, or other incumbent. A ✓ or ✗ denotes status of any incumbent, win or lose respectively.						
Party	Candidate	Votes	%	±%	Party votes	%	±%
CSU	✓ Christian Schmidt	86,997	49.2	▲5.9	75,595	42.8	▲7.1
SPD	Carsten Träger	47,936	27.1	▲2.0	44,485	25.2	▲3.9
Greens	Uwe Kekeritz	14,595	8.3	▼1.4	16,126	9.1	▼2.3
Left	Anny Heike	7,524	4.3	▼3.5	8,816	5.0	▼3.3
AfD	Werner Wolfgang Thiele	5,588	3.2		7,824	4.4	
Pirates	Hilmar Vogel	4,792	2.7	▲0.4	4,148	2.3	▼0.5
FW	Joachim Fulde	3,924	2.2		4,335	2.5	
FDP	Franz Martin Fleischer	3,239	1.8	▼6.8	8,251	4.7	▼9.4
NPD	Richard Vahlber	2,246	1.3	▼0.7	1,739	1.0	▼0.5
ÖDP					1,374	0.8	▼0.1
Tierschutzpartei					1,338	0.8	0.0
REP					887	0.5	▼0.2
BP					772	0.4	▲0.2
DIE FRAUEN					305	0.2	
Party of Reason					217	0.1	
DIE VIOLETTEN					185	0.1	▼0.1
PRO					132	0.1	
RRP					78	0.0	▼0.9
MLPD					70	0.0	0.0
BüSo					30	0.0	0.0
Informal votes		1,370			1,504		
Total valid votes		176,841			176,707		
Turnout		178,211	70.3	▼1.8			
CSU hold	Majority	39,061	22.1	▲3.9			

=== 2009 election ===
Federal election (2009): Fürth
Notes:	Blue background denotes the winner of the electorate vote. Pink background denotes a candidate elected from their party list. Yellow background denotes an electorate win by a list member, or other incumbent. A ✓ or ✗ denotes status of any incumbent, win or lose respectively.						
Party	Candidate	Votes	%	±%	Party votes	%	±%
CSU	✓ Christian Schmidt	76,897	43.3	▼5.7	63,392	35.6	▼6.6
SPD	Marlene Rupprecht	44,505	25.1	▼9.5	37,820	21.3	▼10.9
Greens	Uwe Kekeritz	17,109	9.6	▲4.1	20,314	11.4	▲3.4
FDP	Agnes Meier	15,361	8.7	▲4.5	24,978	14.0	▲5.4
Left	Anny Heike	13,798	7.8	▲3.6	14,667	8.2	▲4.1
Pirates	Alexander Wunschik	4,166	2.3		5,035	2.8	
NPD	Richard Vahlberg	3,551	2.0	▼0.4	2,714	1.5	▼0.3
Freie Union	Bastian Saffer	2,042	1.2				
ÖDP					1,610	0.9	
RRP					1,604	0.9	
FAMILIE					1,512	0.8	▲0.1
Tierschutzpartei					1,355	0.8	
REP					1,251	0.7	▼0.2
BP					492	0.3	▲0.1
PBC					393	0.2	▼0.2
DIE VIOLETTEN					364	0.2	
CM					142	0.1	
DVU					136	0.1	
BüSo					66	0.0	0.0
MLPD					66	0.0	0.0
Informal votes		2,512			2,030		
Total valid votes		177,429			177,911		
Turnout		179,941	72.1	▼5.5			
CSU hold	Majority	32,392	18.2	▲3.8			

=== 2005 election ===
Federal election (2005):Fürth
Notes:	Blue background denotes the winner of the electorate vote. Pink background denotes a candidate elected from their party list. Yellow background denotes an electorate win by a list member, or other incumbent. A ✓ or ✗ denotes status of any incumbent, win or lose respectively.						
Party	Candidate	Votes	%	±%	Party votes	%	±%
CSU	✓ Christian Schmidt	92,017	49.0	▼4.5	79,648	42.3	▼8.3
SPD	Marlene Rupprecht	65,014	34.6	▼1.9	60,544	32.1	▼1.8
Greens	Norbert Schikora	10,319	5.5	▲0.4	15,160	8.0	▲0.6
Left	Thomas Händel	7,913	4.2	▲3.2	7,883	4.2	▲3.4
FDP	Christian Braner	7,896	4.2	▲0.3	16,317	8.7	▲3.9
NPD	Matthias Fischer	4,580	2.4		3,374	1.8	▲1.5
REP					1,617	0.9	▲0.1
Familie					1,327	0.7	
PBC					784	0.4	▲0.2
GRAUEN					371	0.4	▲0.3
Feminist					478	0.3	▲0.1
BP					413	0.2	▲0.2
MLPD					121	0.1	
BüSo					104	0.1	0.0
Informal votes		3,120			2,418		
Total valid votes		187,739			188,441		
Turnout		190,859	77.6	▼3.4			
CSU hold	Majority	27,003	14.4				
