= Kleine Weisach =

River in Germany

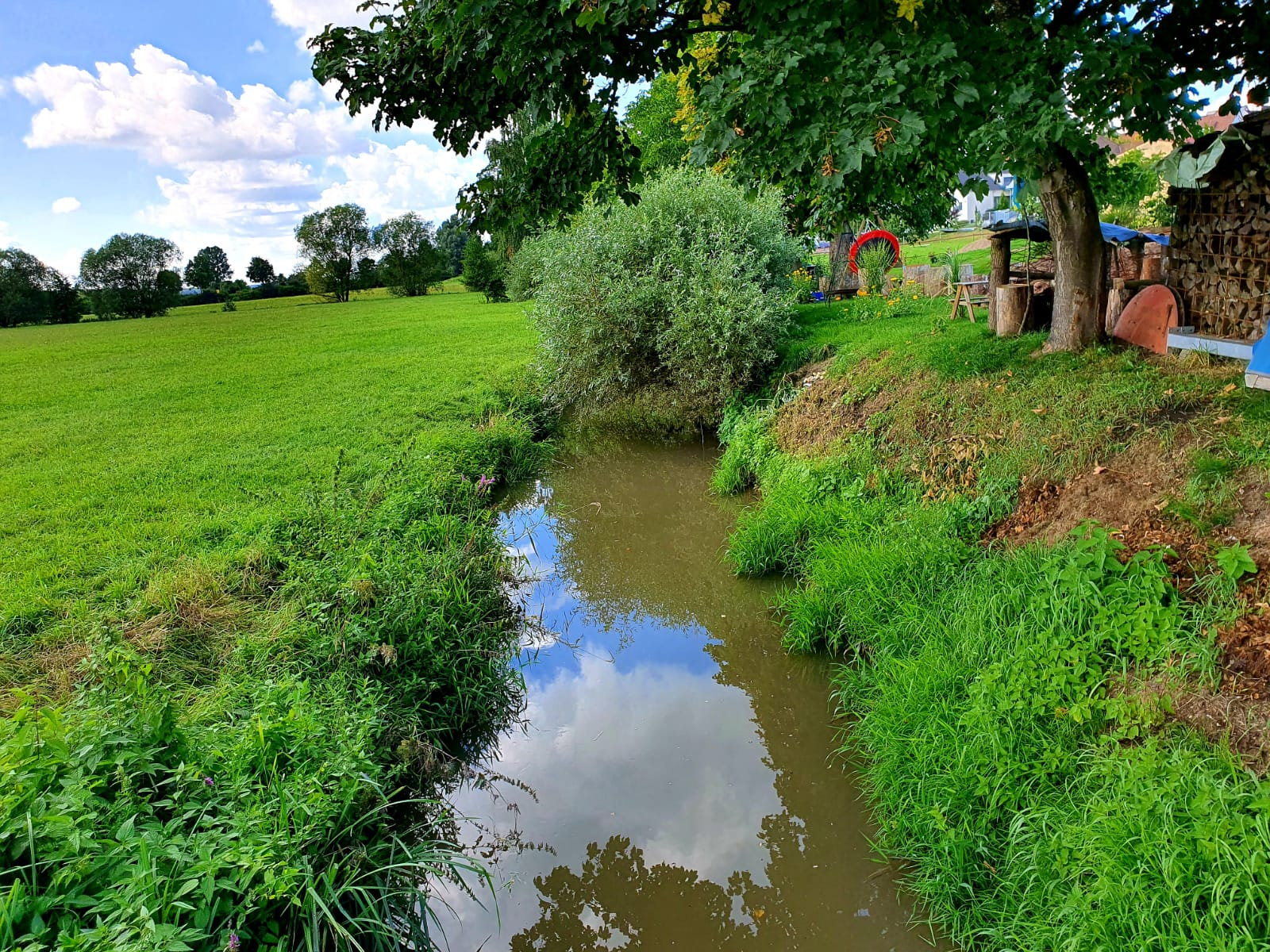
- The Kleine Weisach in Lonnerstadt

Location
- Country: Germany
- State: Bavaria

Physical characteristics
- Mouth
  - location: Aisch
  - coordinates: 49.6929°N 10.7758°E
- Length: 22.4 km (13.9 mi)

Basin features
- Progression: Aisch→ Regnitz→ Main→ Rhine→ North Sea

Kleine Weisach is a river of Bavaria, Germany. It flows into the Aisch near Lonnerstadt.

== See also ==
- List of rivers of Bavaria
