= Höchstadt an der Aisch (Verwaltungsgemeinschaft) =

- Verwaltungsgemeinschaft
- Location of Höchstadt an der Aisch within Erlangen-Höchstadt district
- Interactive map of Höchstadt an der Aisch
- Location within Germany Location within Bavaria
- Coordinates: 49°42′N 10°48′E
- Country: Germany
- State: Bavaria
- Admin. region: Middle Franconia
- District: Erlangen-Höchstadt
- Seat: Höchstadt an der Aisch
- Subdivisions: 4 municipalities

Area
  - Total: 84.11 km^{2} (32.48 sq mi)

Population (2025-12-31)
  - Total: 7,150
  - Density: 85.0/km^{2} (220/sq mi)
- Time zone: UTC+01:00 (CET)
  - Summer (DST): UTC+02:00 (CEST)
- Website: vg-hoechstadt.de

Höchstadt an der Aisch is a Verwaltungsgemeinschaft (federation of municipalities) in the district of Erlangen-Höchstadt in Bavaria in Germany. The seat of the Verwaltungsgemeinschaft is in Höchstadt an der Aisch, itself not part of the Verwaltungsgemeinschaft.

It consists of the following municipalities:

1. Gremsdorf
2. Lonnerstadt
3. Mühlhausen
4. Vestenbergsgreuth
