= Hermann Flender =

German theologian (1653–1725)

Hermann Flender (born in Siegen in 1653; died in Seßlach on 11 May 1725) was a German Roman Catholic theologian, dean, and philanthropist.

== Life ==
He attended university in Prague and is listed in the university's register as a theology and law student. In 1680, he became chaplain under his uncle, Johannes Flender, in Schnaittach.

On the 12th of September, 1682, he became the first pastor of the branch parish of the new church of Sand. In 1684 he was appointed pastor in Wachenroth, in 1689 in Schlüsselfeld, and in 1696 in Seßlach. Later, he became the definitor of the chapter at Ebern.

He died as dean on the 11th of May, 1725, and was buried in the Chapel of the Cross, which he had built. He left the sum of 11,336 guilders (a significant sum at the time) to support the poor and sick of the Seßlach parish; for the purchase of clothing for poor children; and for the building and funding of school libraries.

He is considered a philanthropist.

== Literature ==
- Geschichte der Familie Flender [History of the Flender family], Volume II; Wilhelm Weyer, 1961
