= MartinBauer =

German beverage company

MB-Holding GmbH & Co. KG
- Type: GmbH & Co. KG
- Industry: food and beverages industry; Animal nutrition
- Founded: 1930
- Founders: Martin Bauer
- Headquarters: Vestenbergsgreuth, Germany
- Revenue: €707,1 Mio. (2021)
- Number of employees: 4,394 (2021)
- Website: martin-bauer.com

MartinBauer is a German company that produces plant-based teas, beverages, extracts, and botanicals. It is part of "the nature network". The company, founded by Martin Bauer in 1930, is headquartered in Vestenbergsgreuth.

== History ==
The company founder, Martin Bauer (1902–1998) had an interest in collecting wild herbs. During the 1920s, he started to sell various herbs to pharmacies, drug stores, food stores, and hospitals. In 1930, he founded his company in his home village Vestenbergsgreuth in Middle Franconia. He named the business after himself.

At first, Bauer grew herbs including peppermint, marshmallow root and chamomile in his garden. Following a growing demand, Bauer began sourcing additional herbs from suppliers.

In the 1950s, Martin Bauer's son-in-law Hans Wedel joined the company. The increasing use of tea bags in Germany's post-war era helped the company to grow and expand. Hans Wedel established long-lasting contacts in Eastern Europe for the increased supply of herbs and plants.

In 1960, the company started to use a fine-cutting system that enabled the processing of ten tons of fine herbs every day. In addition to fruit and herbal teas, the company started producing teas and blends for medicinal purposes. During the 1960s, the business grew rapidly under Hans Wedel.

In 1980, the subsidiary Plantextrakt was founded, which entered the plant extract business. In 1986, the MartinBauer company developed a new technology for decaffeinating black tea.

In 1998, MartinBauer acquired the German company Paul Müggenburg in Alveslohe near Hamburg, also a producer of plant-based raw materials. MartinBauer took over their 150 employees.

Since the 1990s, MartinBauer has increasingly entered the international market. It opened locations in Spain, Italy, the United States, Turkey, and China, among other countries.

In 2002, the MB-Holding GmbH & Co KG was founded as the parent company for different subsidiaries of the Martin Bauer Group.

At the start of 2022, the name "MartinBauer" was introduced for the main brand and a leaf was introduced as the new company logo.

MartinBauer targets climate neutrality for their company by 2030.

== Corporate structure ==
Since the re-organization of the company, the MB-Holding GmbH & Co KG is the parent company of several subsidiaries. The subsidiaries of the holding company together form the so-called "the nature network". In 2021, the network had more than 4300 employees and more than 30 locations in 15 countries.

The third and fourth generation of the Bauer family are still involved in the family business as members of the executive board.

In addition to MartinBauer brand, the network consists of three other business divisions:

- Finzelberg, a division in Andernach and part of the company since 1986. Finzelberg, which was originally founded in 1875, is responsible for the development and production of herbal active ingredients for the pharmaceutical and healthcare markets.
- PhytoLab, a consultancy and testing laboratory for the analysis and approval of herbal products (including drugs) for the pharmaceutical industry, and also for other industries like healthcare products, food, and cosmetics. Next to the products of MartinBauer, it also tests the products of several other companies. PhytoLab was founded out of the quality control department of the MartinBauer company in 1993. It is also located in Vestenbergsgreuth.
- Europlant Group, a manufacturer of liquid herbal pharmaceuticals and medicinal teas. The company is located in Eastern Europe.

== Products ==
MartinBauer manufactures and supplies herbal and fruit teas, botanicals, tinctures, powders, and nutritional supplements.

The company works with more than 200 raw materials from over 400 raw material suppliers in over 80 countries. In 2011, MartinBauer implemented the so-called mabagrown standard to enhance product quality, transparency, and sustainability across a broader portion of the supply chain. The product standard is accepted by the Rainforest Alliance and by the Union for Ethical Biotrade.

== Sponsoring ==
MartinBauer is the main sponsor for the football club TSV Vestenbergsgreuth since its founding in 1974. In 1995, the first men's soccer team TSV and the Spielvereinigung Fürth joined forces and became the SpVgg Greuther Fürth, which is also sponsored by MartinBauer.
