= Oberreichenbach =

Oberreichenbach may refer to:

== Germany ==
- Oberreichenbach, Baden-Württemberg, a town in the district of Calw, Baden-Württemberg
- Oberreichenbach, Bavaria, a town in the district of Erlangen-Höchstadt, Bavaria
- Oberreichenbach a part of Weißenhorn, Neu-Ulm, Bavaria
- Oberreichenbach a part of Großhabersdorf, Fürth, Bavaria
- Oberreichenbach a part of Kammerstein, Roth, Bavaria
- Oberreichenbach a part of Birstein, Main-Kinzig-Kreis, Hesse
- Oberreichenbach a part of Brand-Erbisdorf, Mittelsachsen, Saxony
- Oberreichenbach a part of Reichenbach (Oberlausitz), Görlitz, Saxony
- Oberreichenbach a part of Reichenbach im Vogtland, Vogtlandkreis, Saxony
