= Uttenreuth (Verwaltungsgemeinschaft) =

- Verwaltungsgemeinschaft
- Location of Uttenreuth within Erlangen-Höchstadt district
- Interactive map of Uttenreuth
- Location within Germany Location within Bavaria
- Coordinates: 49°36′N 11°04′E
- Country: Germany
- State: Bavaria
- Admin. region: Middle Franconia
- District: Erlangen-Höchstadt
- Seat: Uttenreuth
- Subdivisions: 4 municipalities

Area
  - Total: 17.18 km^{2} (6.63 sq mi)

Population (2025-12-31)
  - Total: 11,791
  - Density: 686.3/km^{2} (1,778/sq mi)
- Time zone: UTC+01:00 (CET)
  - Summer (DST): UTC+02:00 (CEST)
- Website: vg-uttenreuth.de

Uttenreuth is a Verwaltungsgemeinschaft (federation of municipalities) in the district of Erlangen-Höchstadt in Bavaria in Germany. The seat of the Verwaltungsgemeinschaft is in Uttenreuth.

It consists of the following municipalities:

1. Buckenhof
2. Marloffstein
3. Spardorf
4. Uttenreuth
