= Aurachtal (Verwaltungsgemeinschaft) =

- Verwaltungsgemeinschaft
- Location of Aurachtal within Erlangen-Höchstadt district
- Interactive map of Aurachtal
- Location within Germany Location within Bavaria
- Coordinates: 49°34′N 10°49′E
- Country: Germany
- State: Bavaria
- Admin. region: Middle Franconia
- District: Erlangen-Höchstadt
- Seat: Aurachtal
- Subdivisions: 2 municipalities

Area
  - Total: 23.22 km^{2} (8.97 sq mi)

Population (2025-12-31)
  - Total: 4,465
  - Density: 192.3/km^{2} (498.0/sq mi)
- Time zone: UTC+01:00 (CET)
  - Summer (DST): UTC+02:00 (CEST)
- Website: www.vg-aurachtal.de

Aurachtal is a Verwaltungsgemeinschaft (federation of municipalities) in the district of Erlangen-Höchstadt in Bavaria in Germany. The seat of the Verwaltungsgemeinschaft is in Aurachtal.

It consists of the following municipalities:

1. Aurachtal
2. Oberreichenbach
