= Großenseebach =

- Municipality
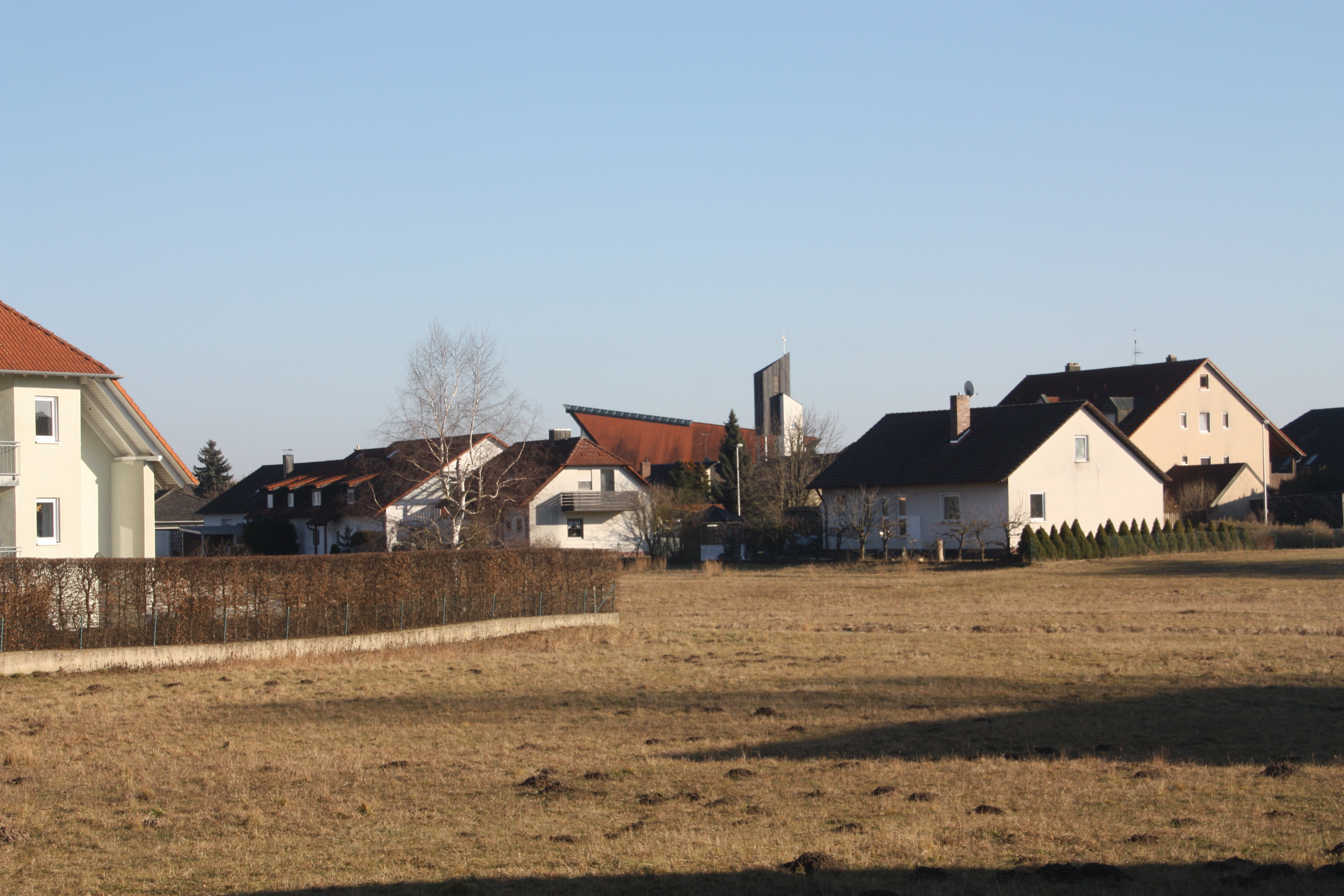
- Großenseebach

- Coat of arms

- Location of Großenseebach within Erlangen-Höchstadt district
- Interactive map of Großenseebach
- Location within Germany Location within Bavaria
- Coordinates: 49°37′53″N 10°52′38″E
- Country: Germany
- State: Bavaria
- Admin. region: Mittelfranken
- District: Erlangen-Höchstadt
- Municipal assoc.: Heßdorf

Government
  - Mayor (2020–26): Jürgen Jäkel

Area
  - Total: 7.21 km^{2} (2.78 sq mi)
- Elevation: 296 m (971 ft)

Population (2025-12-31)
  - Total: 2,408
  - Density: 334/km^{2} (865/sq mi)
- Time zone: UTC+01:00 (CET)
  - Summer (DST): UTC+02:00 (CEST)
- Postal codes: 91091
- Dialling codes: 09135
- Vehicle registration: ERH
- Website: www.grossenseebach.de

Großenseebach is a village in the district of Erlangen-Höchstadt in Bavaria in Germany.

== History ==
First mentioned in 1348, the village was completely destroyed in the Thirty Years' War. Großenseebach belonged to Prussia from 1803 to 1810, then to Bavaria and was assigned to the city of Herzogenaurach in 1811. Today's political community came into being in 1818. 1980 the free communities Großenseebach and Heßdorf created the "Verwaltungsgemeinschaft Heßdorf". There are no grocery stores but plenty of carp ponds. The only fried carp available are at Kunnersch Annie's every Friday when in season.

== Economy ==
Today most inhabitants work for the big companies in Erlangen, such as Siemens.
