= Buckenhof =

- Town
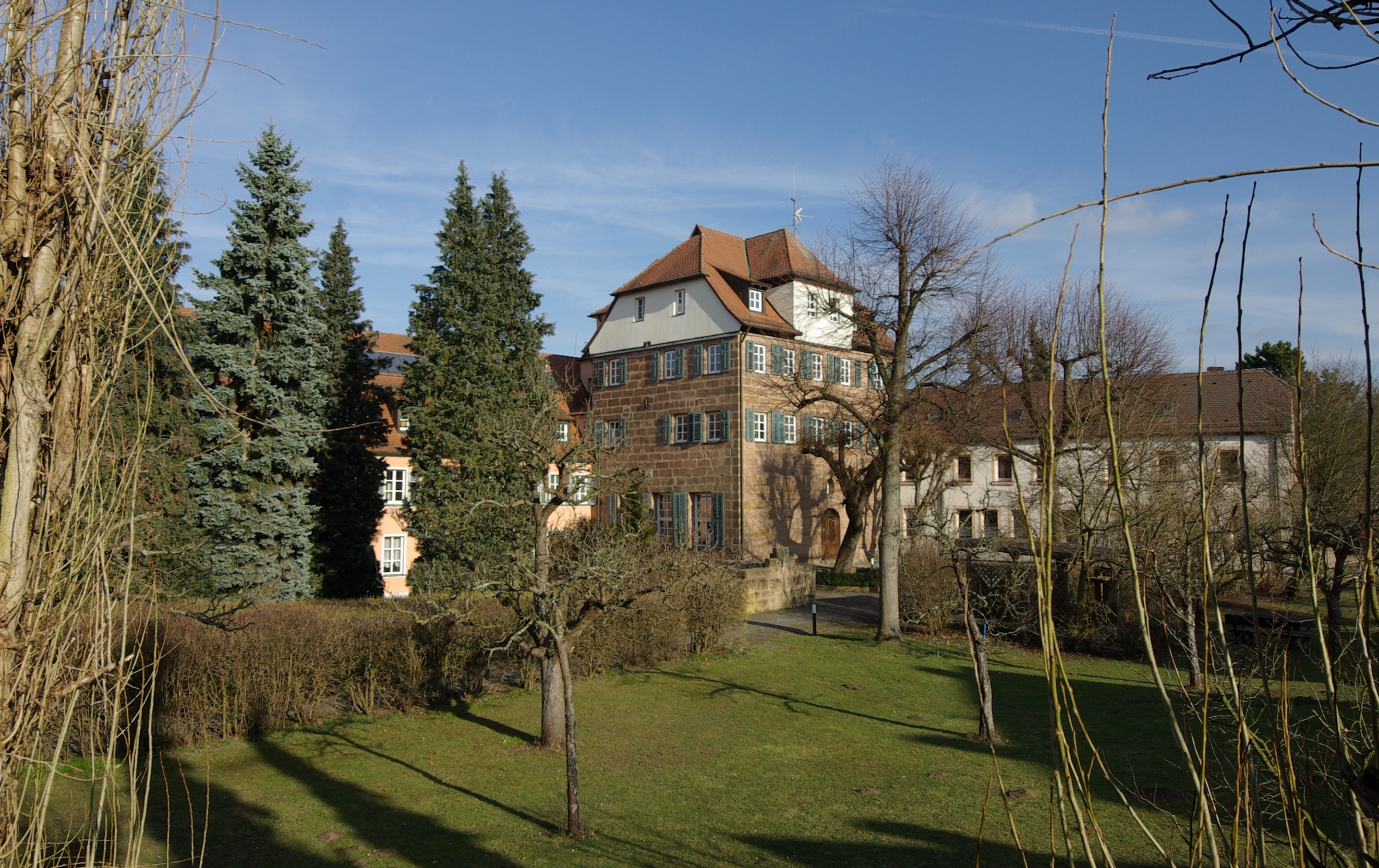
- Puckenhof Castle

- Coat of arms

- Location of Buckenhof within Erlangen-Höchstadt district
- Interactive map of Buckenhof
- Location within Germany Location within Bavaria
- Coordinates: 49°35′38″N 11°03′00″E
- Country: Germany
- State: Bavaria
- Admin. region: Middle Franconia
- District: Erlangen-Höchstadt
- Municipal assoc.: Uttenreuth

Government
  - Mayor (2020–26): Astrid Kaiser (SPD)

Area
  - Total: 1.38 km^{2} (0.53 sq mi)
- Elevation: 286 m (938 ft)

Population (2025-12-31)
  - Total: 3,180
  - Density: 2,300/km^{2} (5,970/sq mi)
- Time zone: UTC+01:00 (CET)
  - Summer (DST): UTC+02:00 (CEST)
- Postal codes: 91054
- Dialling codes: 09131
- Vehicle registration: ERH
- Website: www.buckenhof.de

Buckenhof is a municipality in the district of Erlangen-Höchstadt, in Bavaria, Germany.

== History ==
The village called Buckenhof developed between the 11th and 12th century. The first public record is from 1372. Between the years 1564 and 1567, the barons von Haller build the Puckenhof Castle. Since 1850, it houses a youth center of the Inner Mission. Between 1886 and 1963, Buckenhof was located along the branch line from Erlangen to Uttenreuth.

=== Population development ===
Together with the neighboring Erlangen, Buckenhof experienced a tremendous increase in its population after the Second World War. Since 2000, Buckenhof is one of the most densely populated communities in Bavaria. The extraordinary popularity of the village, which is due to Buckenhof's location near the industrial center of Erlangen and at the same time its proximity to a large nature preserve, has resulted in high land prices.
