= Heßdorf (Verwaltungsgemeinschaft) =

- Verwaltungsgemeinschaft
- Location of Heßdorf within Erlangen-Höchstadt district
- Interactive map of Heßdorf
- Location within Germany Location within Bavaria
- Coordinates: 49°38′N 10°55′E
- Country: Germany
- State: Bavaria
- Admin. region: Middle Franconia
- District: Erlangen-Höchstadt
- Seat: Heßdorf
- Subdivisions: 2 municipalities

Area
  - Total: 31.97 km^{2} (12.34 sq mi)

Population (2025-12-31)
  - Total: 6,242
  - Density: 195.2/km^{2} (505.7/sq mi)
- Time zone: UTC+01:00 (CET)
  - Summer (DST): UTC+02:00 (CEST)
- Website: www.vg-hessdorf.de

Heßdorf is a Verwaltungsgemeinschaft (federation of municipalities) in the district of Erlangen-Höchstadt in Bavaria in Germany. The seat of the Verwaltungsgemeinschaft is in Heßdorf.

It consists of the following municipalities:

1. Großenseebach
2. Heßdorf
