= Mühlhausen, Middle Franconia =

Mühlhausen
- Municipality
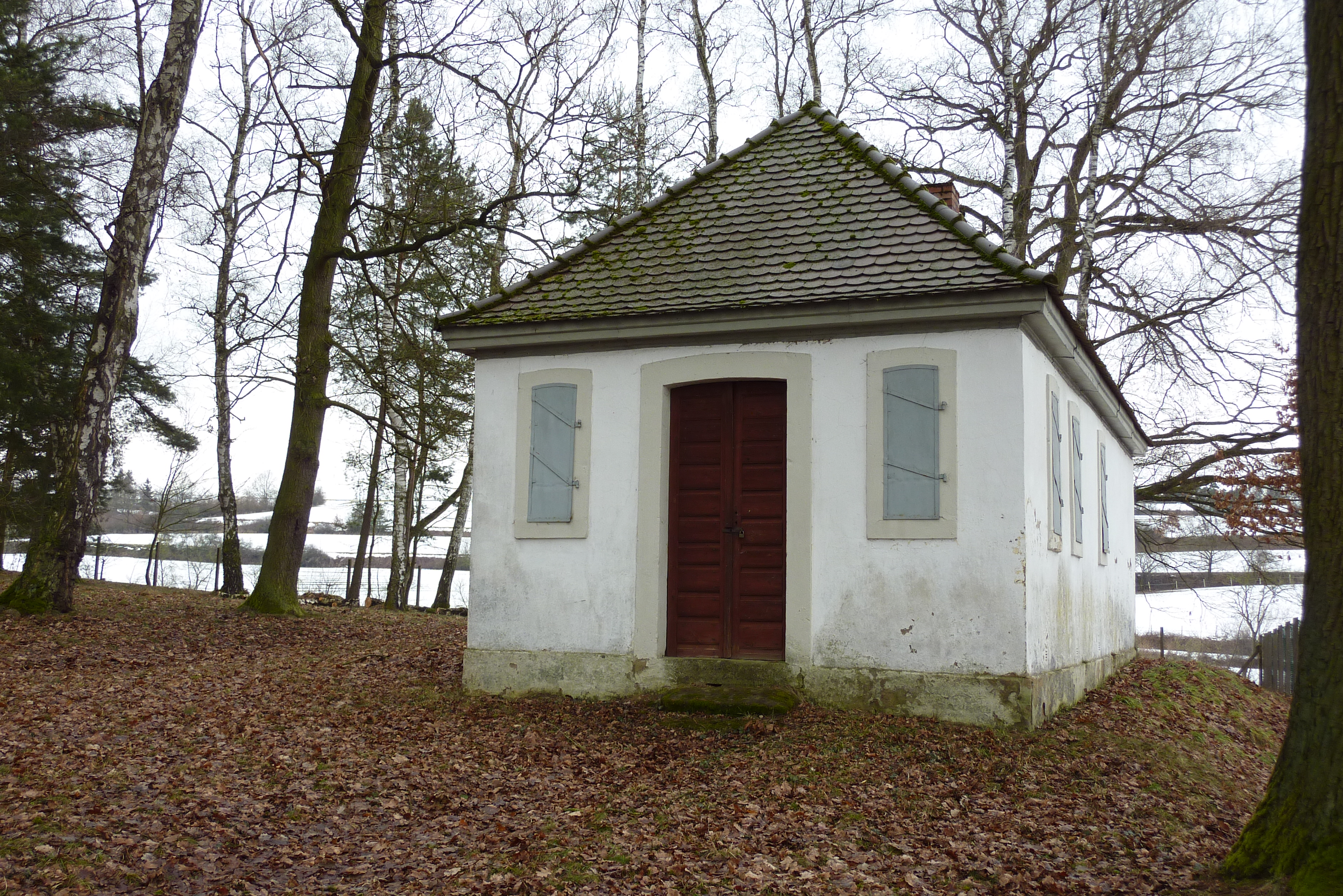
- Burial hall at the Jewish cemetery in Mühlhausen

- Coat of arms

- Location of Mühlhausen within Erlangen-Höchstadt district
- Interactive map of Mühlhausen
- Location within Germany Location within Bavaria
- Coordinates: 49°45′N 10°46′E
- Country: Germany
- State: Bavaria
- Admin. region: Middle Franconia
- District: Erlangen-Höchstadt
- Municipal assoc.: Höchstadt an der Aisch
- Subdivisions: 3 districts

Government
  - Mayor (2020–26): Klaus Faatz (CSU)

Area
  - Total: 16.6 km^{2} (6.4 sq mi)
- Elevation: 275 m (902 ft)

Population (2025-12-31)
  - Total: 1,850
  - Density: 111/km^{2} (289/sq mi)
- Time zone: UTC+01:00 (CET)
  - Summer (DST): UTC+02:00 (CEST)
- Postal codes: 96172
- Dialling codes: 09548
- Vehicle registration: ERH
- Website: www.markt-muehlhausen.de

Mühlhausen (German pronunciation: [myːlˈhaʊzn̩]) is a municipality in the district of Erlangen-Höchstadt, in Bavaria, Germany.
