= Tobias Winkler =

German politician

Tobias Winkler MdB
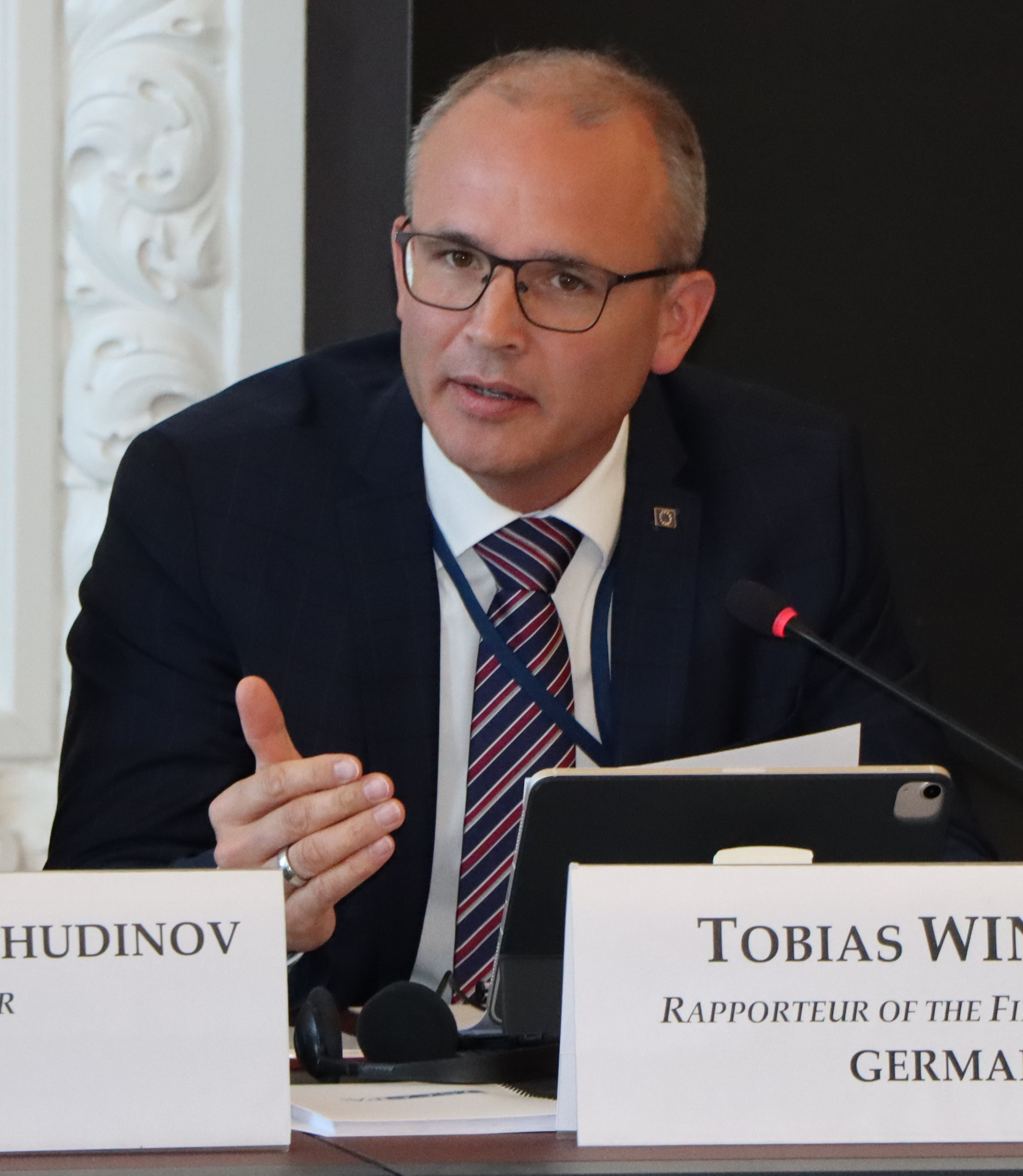
- Winkler in 2025

Member of the Bundestag; for Fürth
- Incumbent
- Assumed office 26 October 2021
- Preceded by: Christian Schmidt

Personal details
- Born: 16 January 1978 (age 48) Nuremberg, West Germany
- Party: Christian Social Union

Tobias Winkler (born 16 January 1978) is a German politician for the CSU and since 2021 has been a member of the Bundestag, the federal diet.

== Life and politics ==
Winkler was born in 1978 in the West German city of Nuremberg and studied politics in Munich.

Winkler became a member of the Bundestag in 2021.
