= Erlangen-Höchstadt =

Coordinates: 49°40′N 10°50′E

- District
- Flag Coat of arms
- Country: Germany
- State: Bavaria
- Adm. region: Middle Franconia
- Capital: Erlangen

Government
  - District admin.: Alexander Tritthart (CSU)

Area
  - Total: 565 km^{2} (218 sq mi)

Population (31 December 2025)
  - Total: 138,365
  - Density: 245/km^{2} (634/sq mi)
- Time zone: UTC+01:00 (CET)
  - Summer (DST): UTC+02:00 (CEST)
- Vehicle registration: ERH, HÖS
- Website: erlangen-hoechstadt.de

Erlangen-Höchstadt is a Landkreis (district) in Bavaria, Germany. It is bounded by (from the south and clockwise) the districts of Fürth, Neustadt (Aisch)-Bad Windsheim, Bamberg, Forchheim and Nürnberger Land, and by the cities of Nuremberg and Erlangen. The city of Erlangen is not part of the district, but nonetheless its administrative seat.

== History ==
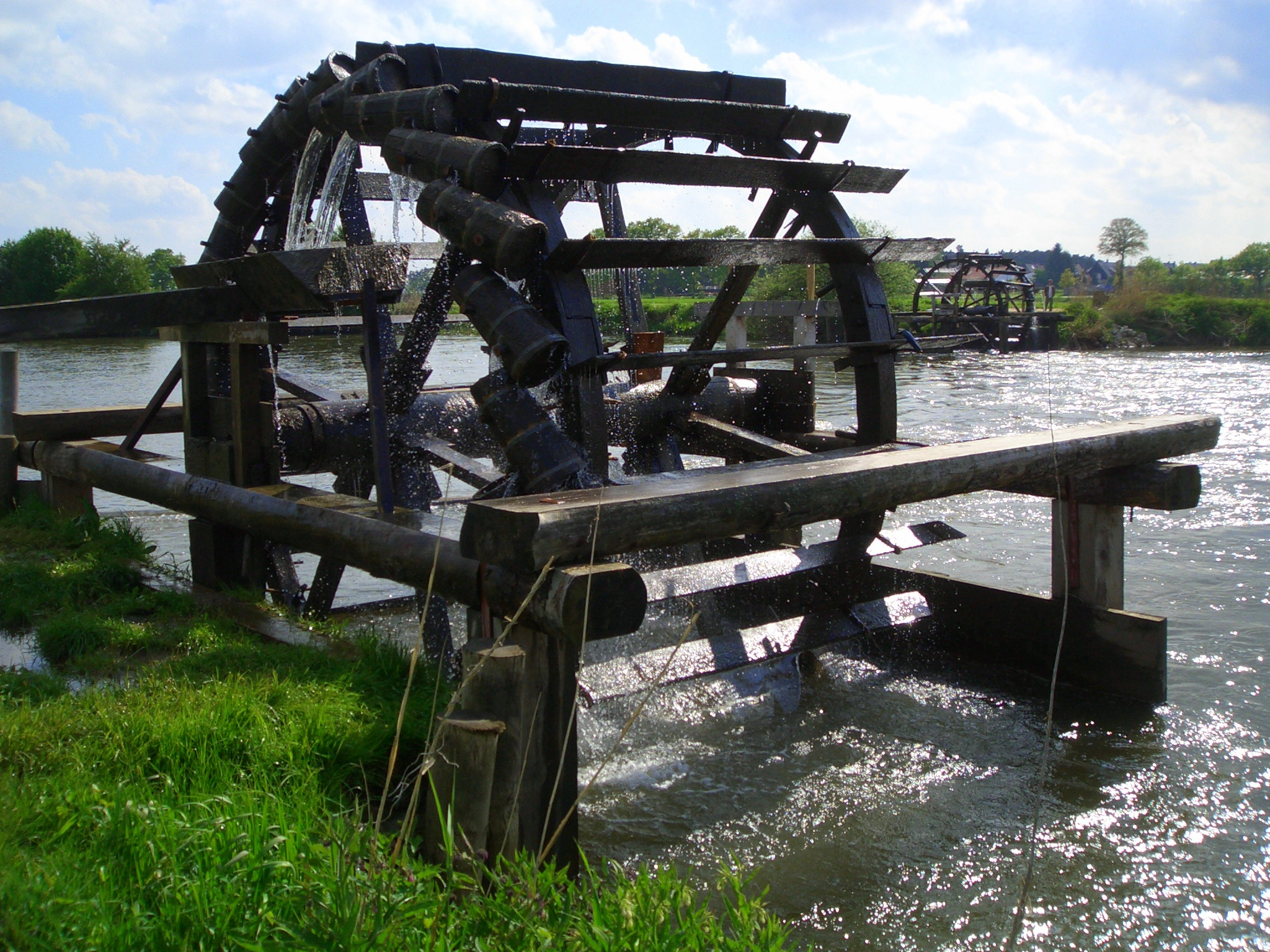
Waterwheel in the Regnitz near Möhrendorf

The earliest extant documents are drawings from 1413 which show water wheels along the Regnitz. The first (1449–1450) and second (1552–1555) Margrave wars, Brandenburg versus Nuremberg, devastated the countryside.

In 1715 a lock was placed in the Regnitz river at Hemhofen. The highpoint of waterwheel usage was in the early 19th century when more than 190 were in use between Fuerth and Forchheim.

The district was established in 1972 by merging the former districts of Erlangen and Höchstadt.

== Geography ==
The main river is the Regnitz, which runs through the city of Erlangen. Lands west of the river are covered with several hundred tiny lakes on both sides of the Aisch. The Aisch is an affluent of the Regnitz, running from southwest to east. East of the river the country is rising to the hills of the northern Frankish Alb.

== Coat of arms ==
The coat of arms displays:

- the lion of the clerical state of Bamberg, which ruled the district's western half until 1802
- the red and white border of the right half is taken from the arms of Brandenburg-Kulmbach (see Bayreuth)
- the blue and gold colours of the right half are identical to the heraldic colours of Nuremberg
- the image in the right half symbolises a watermill on the river Regnitz

== Towns and municipalities ==
Clickable map of towns and municipalities in the district

Towns
1. Baiersdorf
2. Herzogenaurach
3. Höchstadt
Märkte
1. Eckental
2. Heroldsberg
3. Wachenroth
4. Weisendorf
Municipalities
1. Adelsdorf
2. Bubenreuth
3. Hemhofen
4. Kalchreuth
5. Möhrendorf
6. Röttenbach

Verwaltungsgemeinschaften
1. Aurachtal; 1. Aurachtal^{1}; 2. Oberreichenbach	2. Heßdorf; 1. Großenseebach; 2. Heßdorf^{1}	3. Höchstadt an der Aisch; 1. Gremsdorf; 2. Lonnerstadt^{2}; 3. Mühlhausen^{2}; 4. Vestenbergsgreuth^{2}	4. Uttenreuth; 1. Buckenhof; 2. Marloffstein; 3. Spardorf; 4. Uttenreuth^{1}
^{1}seat of the Verwaltungsgemeinschaft; ^{2}Markt
