= Gremsdorf =

- Municipality
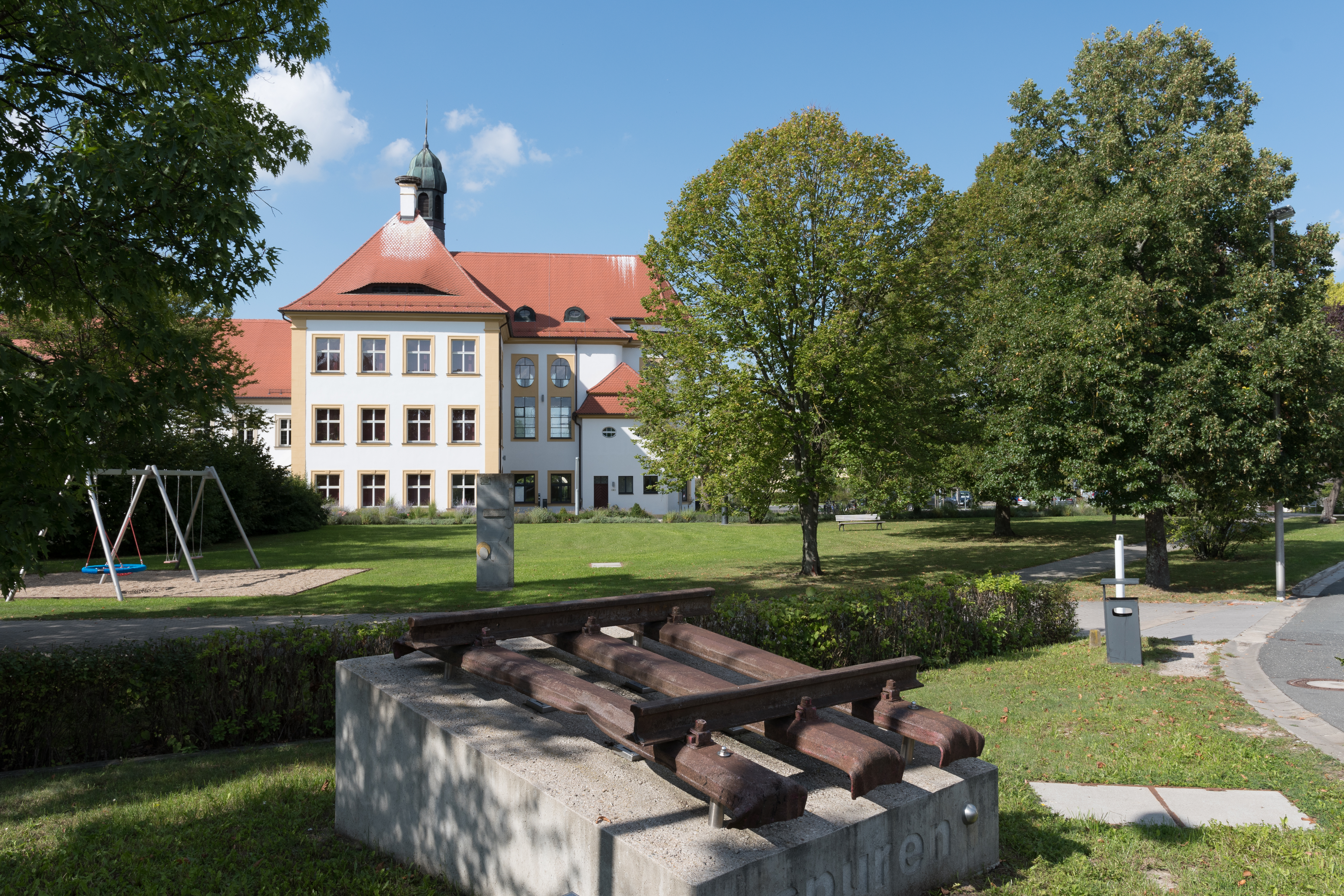
- Gremsdorf Castle

- Coat of arms

- Location of Gremsdorf within Erlangen-Höchstadt district
- Interactive map of Gremsdorf
- Location within Germany Location within Bavaria
- Coordinates: 49°42′N 10°50′E
- Country: Germany
- State: Bavaria
- Admin. region: Mittelfranken
- District: Erlangen-Höchstadt
- Municipal assoc.: Höchstadt an der Aisch
- Subdivisions: 4

Government
  - Mayor (2020–26): Norbert Walter (CSU)

Area
  - Total: 12.96 km^{2} (5.00 sq mi)
- Elevation: 270 m (890 ft)

Population (2025-12-31)
  - Total: 1,636
  - Density: 126.2/km^{2} (326.9/sq mi)
- Time zone: UTC+01:00 (CET)
  - Summer (DST): UTC+02:00 (CEST)
- Postal codes: 91350
- Dialling codes: 09193, 09195 (Buch)
- Vehicle registration: ERH
- Website: www.gremsdorf.de

Gremsdorf is a municipality in the district of Erlangen-Höchstadt, in Bavaria, Germany.
