= Aisch =

River in Germany

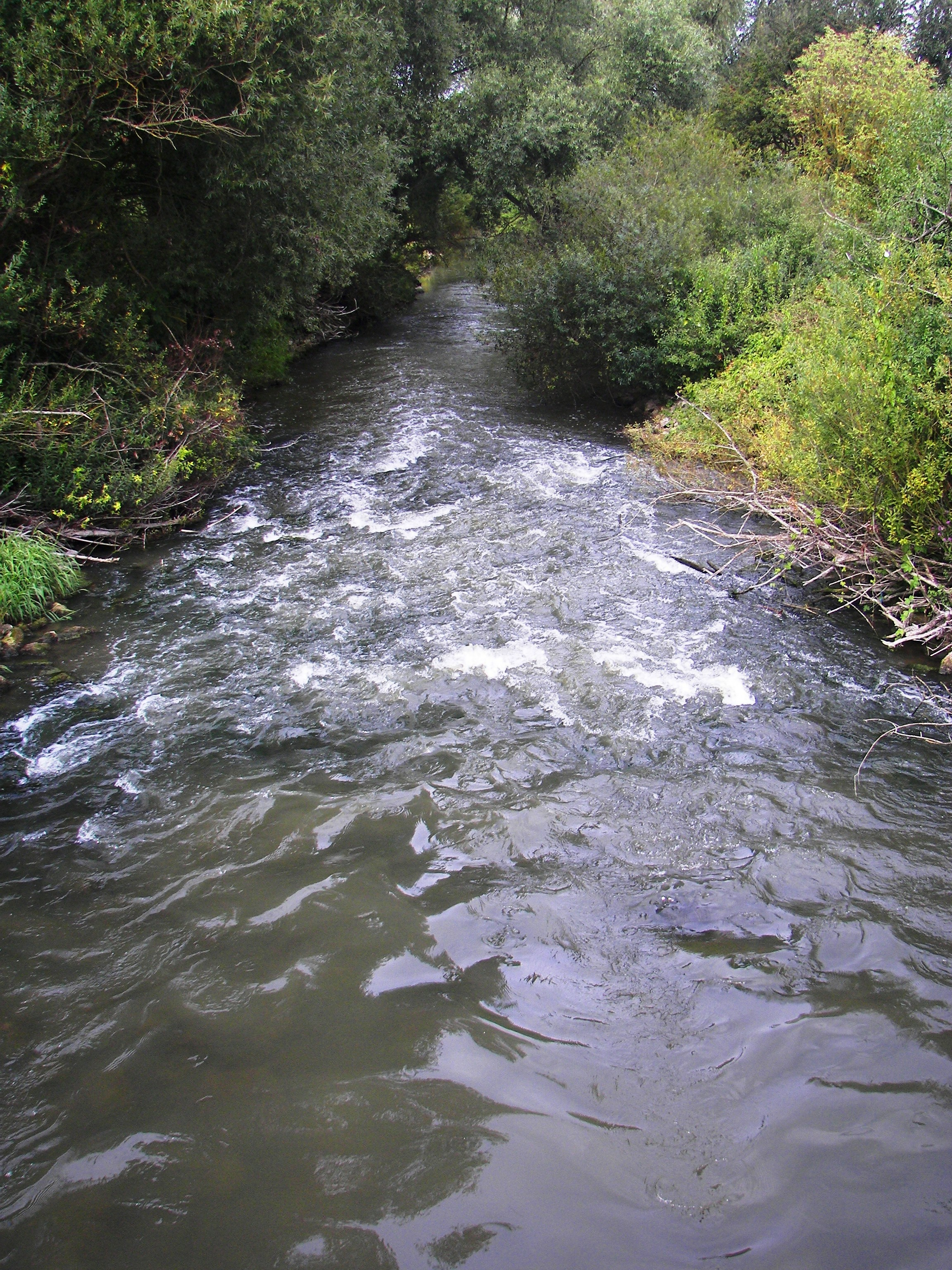
- The river Aisch near Adelsdorf

- Location of mouth

Location
- Country: Germany
- State: Bavaria

Physical characteristics
- Mouth
  - location: Regnitz
  - coordinates: 49°46′53″N 11°0′32″E
- Length: 83.0 km (51.6 mi)
- Basin size: 1,007 km^{2} (389 sq mi)

Basin features
- Progression: Regnitz→ Main→ Rhine→ North Sea

The Aisch (German pronunciation: [aɪʃ]) is an 83 km long tributary of the Regnitz in Middle- and Upper Franconia, in the state of Bavaria in southern Germany. It passes through Bad Windsheim, Neustadt an der Aisch and Höchstadt, and flows into the Regnitz near Altendorf.

== See also ==
- List of rivers of Bavaria
