= Höchstadt =

- Town
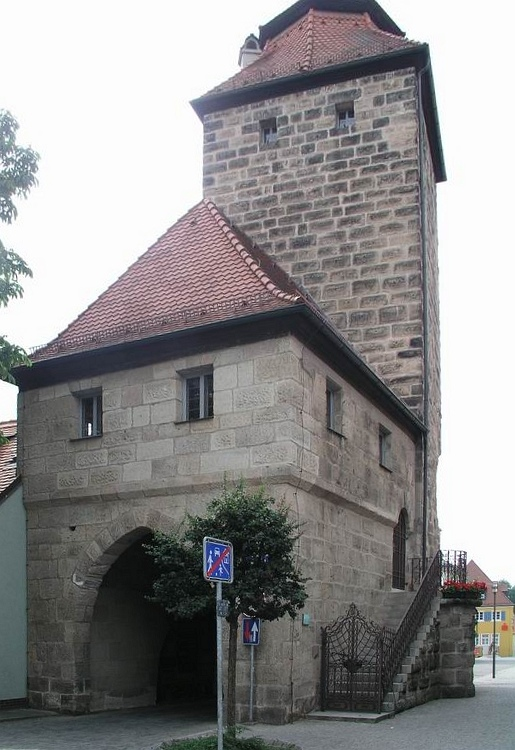
- Town tower

- Coat of arms

- Location of Höchstadt within Erlangen-Höchstadt district
- Interactive map of Höchstadt
- Location within Germany Location within Bavaria
- Coordinates: 49°42′N 10°48′E
- Country: Germany
- State: Bavaria
- Admin. region: Middle Franconia
- District: Erlangen-Höchstadt
- Subdivisions: 23 districts

Government
  - Mayor (2020–26): Gerald Brehm

Area
  - Total: 70.87 km^{2} (27.36 sq mi)
- Elevation: 273 m (896 ft)

Population (2025-12-31)
  - Total: 13,827
  - Density: 195.1/km^{2} (505.3/sq mi)
- Time zone: UTC+01:00 (CET)
  - Summer (DST): UTC+02:00 (CEST)
- Postal codes: 91315
- Dialling codes: 09193
- Vehicle registration: ERH, HÖS
- Website: www.hoechstadt.de

Höchstadt an der Aisch (German pronunciation: [ˈhøːçʃtat ʔan deːɐ̯ ˈʔaɪʃ], lit. 'Höchstadt on the Aisch'), commonly known as Höchstadt ([ˈhøːçʃtat]), is a town in the Erlangen-Höchstadt district, in Bavaria, Germany.

== Geography ==
Höchstadt is situated on the river Aisch, 18 km northwest of Erlangen and 22 km south of Bamberg. Originally it was the capital of the Höchstadt district, but then it became part of the new Erlangen-Höchstadt district.

=== Division of the town ===
The town consists of 23 districts:

- Ailersbach
- Antoniuskapelle
- Biengarten
- Bösenbechhofen
- Etzelskirchen
- Förtschwind
- Greiendorf
- Greienmühle
- Greuth
- Großneuses
- Jungenhofen
- Kieferndorf
- Kleinneuses
- Lappach
- Mechelwind
- Medbach
- Mohrhof
- Nackendorf
- Saltendorf
- Schwarzenbach
- Sterpersdorf
- Weidendorf
- Zentbechhofen

== Leisure ==
=== Food ===
Carp is a very important food, but only in the months with an "r" (September, October, November, December, January, February, March, April). There are various carp dishes: e.g., "blue carp", "baked carp" and "pepper carp". Carp eaten there is termed "Aischgründer Karpfen".

=== Culture ===
There is an events centre (converted from a former shoe factory) that includes a music school and a library; there is an evening event most days.

== Sport ==
The sports club HK Zubr Höchstadt Aisch won the German Bandy Championship in its first season, 2014/15.

== See also ==
- Realschule Hoechstadt

== Notable people ==
- Johann Baptist Ritter von Spix (1781–1826) biologist.
