= Vestenbergsgreuth =

- Municipality
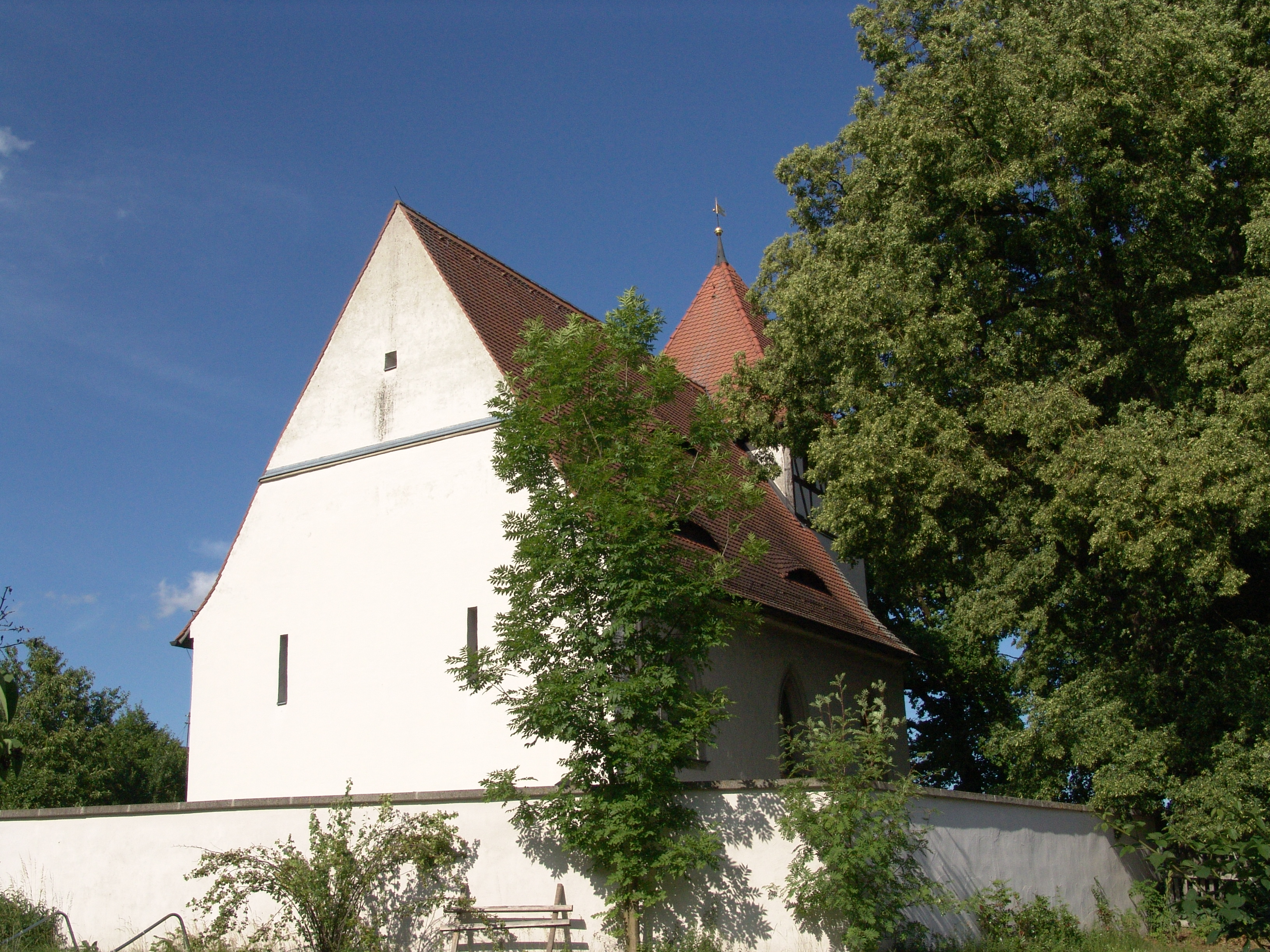
- Protestant church in Pretzdorf

- Coat of arms

- Location of Vestenbergsgreuth within Erlangen-Höchstadt district
- Interactive map of Vestenbergsgreuth
- Location within Germany Location within Bavaria
- Coordinates: 49°40′N 10°37′E
- Country: Germany
- State: Bavaria
- Admin. region: Mittelfranken
- District: Erlangen-Höchstadt
- Municipal assoc.: Höchstadt an der Aisch

Government
  - Mayor (2023–29): Bernd Müller

Area
  - Total: 31.85 km^{2} (12.30 sq mi)
- Elevation: 305 m (1,001 ft)

Population (2025-12-31)
  - Total: 1,599
  - Density: 50.20/km^{2} (130.0/sq mi)
- Time zone: UTC+01:00 (CET)
  - Summer (DST): UTC+02:00 (CEST)
- Postal codes: 91487
- Dialling codes: 09163
- Vehicle registration: ERH
- Website: www.vestenbergsgreuth.de

Vestenbergsgreuth is a municipality in the district of Erlangen-Höchstadt, in Bavaria, Germany.
