= Wachenroth =

- Municipality
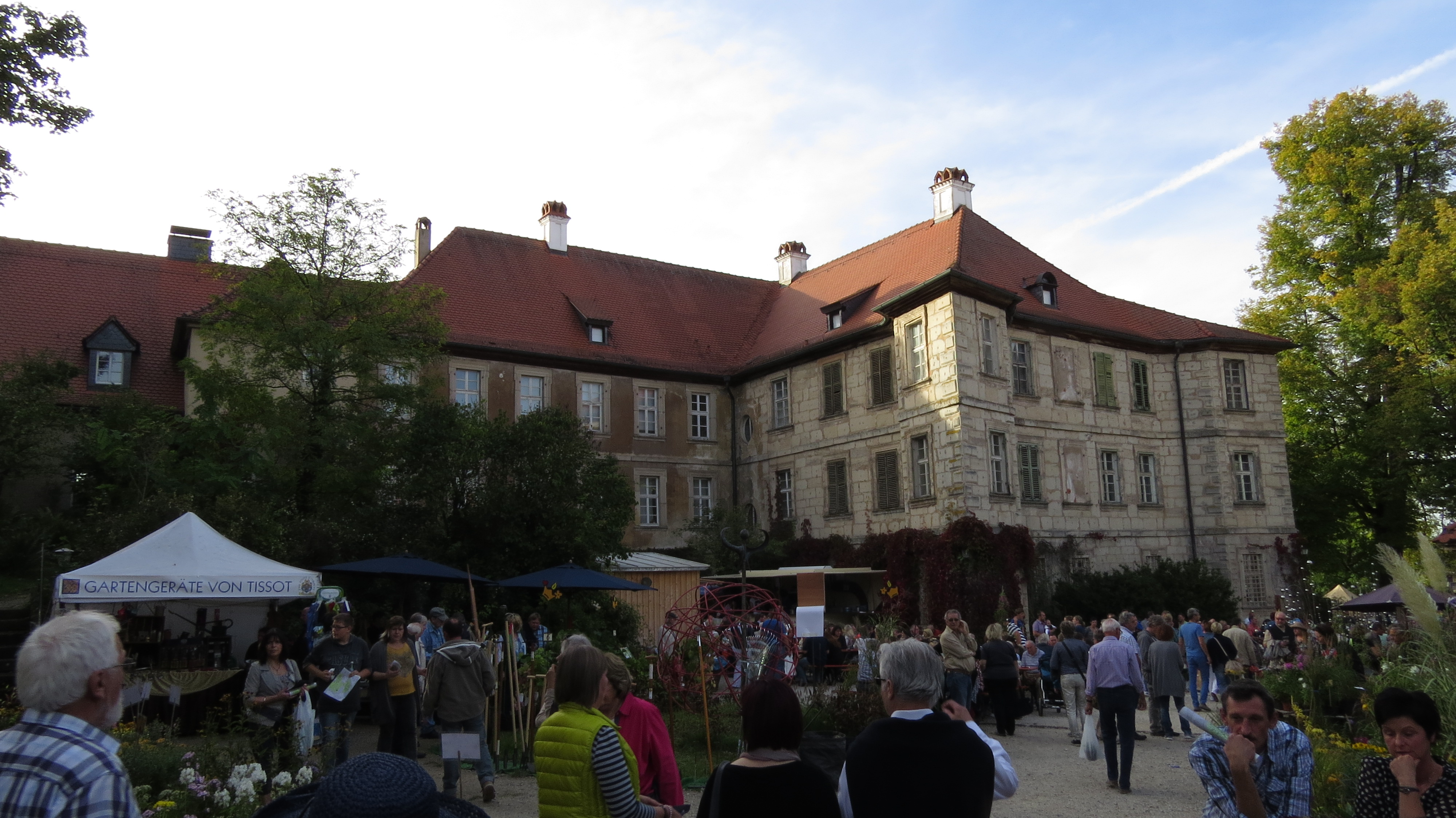
- Weingartsgreuth Castle

- Coat of arms

- Location of Wachenroth within Erlangen-Höchstadt district
- Interactive map of Wachenroth
- Location within Germany Location within Bavaria
- Coordinates: 49°45′N 10°43′E
- Country: Germany
- State: Bavaria
- Admin. region: Mittelfranken
- District: Erlangen-Höchstadt
- Subdivisions: 9 districts

Government
  - Mayor (2023–29): Reiner Braun

Area
  - Total: 23.16 km^{2} (8.94 sq mi)
- Elevation: 285 m (935 ft)

Population (2025-12-31)
  - Total: 2,256
  - Density: 97.41/km^{2} (252.3/sq mi)
- Time zone: UTC+01:00 (CET)
  - Summer (DST): UTC+02:00 (CEST)
- Postal codes: 96193
- Dialling codes: 09548
- Vehicle registration: ERH
- Website: www.wachenroth.de

Wachenroth is a municipality in the district of Erlangen-Höchstadt, in Bavaria, Germany.

== Geography ==
Wachenroth is situated in the valley of the Reiche Ebrach river, a left tributary of the Regnitz river, at the southern end of the Steigerwald, approx. 20 kilometers northwest of Erlangen.

=== Division of the town ===
- Buchfeld
- Warmersdorf
- Weingartsgreuth
- Horbach
- Reumannswind
- Volkersdorf
- Oberalbach
- Unteralbach
- Eckartsmühle

== History ==
- 1008 Earliest known documentary mention
- 1434 Wachenroth receives the market rights
- 1978 Incorporation of Weingartsgreuth with Buchfeld, Horbach and Warmersdorf

== Politics ==
Since 1 January 2008 Wachenroth is no longer part of the municipal association (Verwaltungsgemeinschaft) Höchstadt an der Aisch.
