= Heßdorf =

- Town
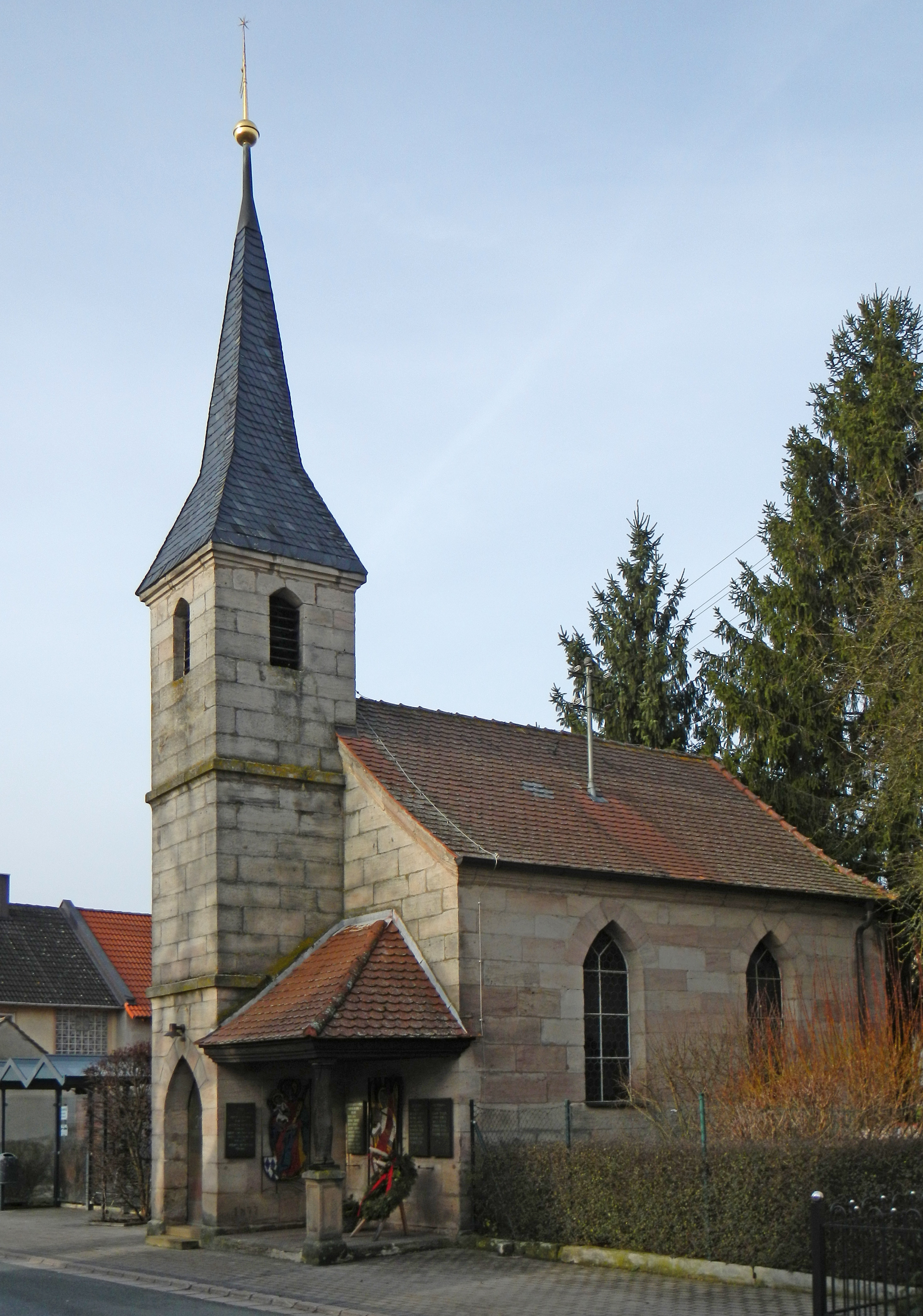
- Chapel of Saint Ottilia in Hesselberg

- Coat of arms

- Location of Heßdorf within Erlangen-Höchstadt district
- Interactive map of Heßdorf
- Location within Germany Location within Bavaria
- Coordinates: 49°38′N 10°55′E
- Country: Germany
- State: Bavaria
- Admin. region: Mittelfranken
- District: Erlangen-Höchstadt
- Municipal assoc.: Heßdorf

Government
  - Mayor (2020–26): Horst Rehder

Area
  - Total: 24.79 km^{2} (9.57 sq mi)
- Elevation: 290 m (950 ft)

Population (2025-12-31)
  - Total: 3,834
  - Density: 154.7/km^{2} (400.6/sq mi)
- Time zone: UTC+01:00 (CET)
  - Summer (DST): UTC+02:00 (CEST)
- Postal codes: 91093
- Dialling codes: 09135
- Vehicle registration: ERH
- Website: www.Hessdorf.de

Heßdorf is a town in the district of Erlangen-Höchstadt, in Bavaria, Germany.
