= Reichenbach (Litschau) =

- Village
- Location within Austria
- Coordinates: 48°56′N 15°2′E
- Country: Austria
- State: Lower Austria
- District: Gmünd
- Municipality: Litschau
- Elevation: 545 m (1,788 ft)
- Time zone: UTC+1 (CET)
  - Summer (DST): UTC+2 (CEST)
- Postal code: 3874
- Area code: 02865
- Website: www.litschau.at

Reichenbach (Austrian German pronunciation: [ˈraɪçn̩ˌbax]) is a village and a cadastral municipality of Litschau, a town in the district of Gmünd in Lower Austria, Austria.

== Housing Development ==
At the turn of 1979/1980 there was a total of 20 building plots with 12.073 m² and 19 gardens with 8.481 m², 1989/1990 there were 29 buildings plots. At the turn of 1999/2000, the number of buildings plots had increased to 79 and at the turn of 2009/2010 there were 34 buildings on 64 building plots.
