= Lonnerstadt =

- Municipality
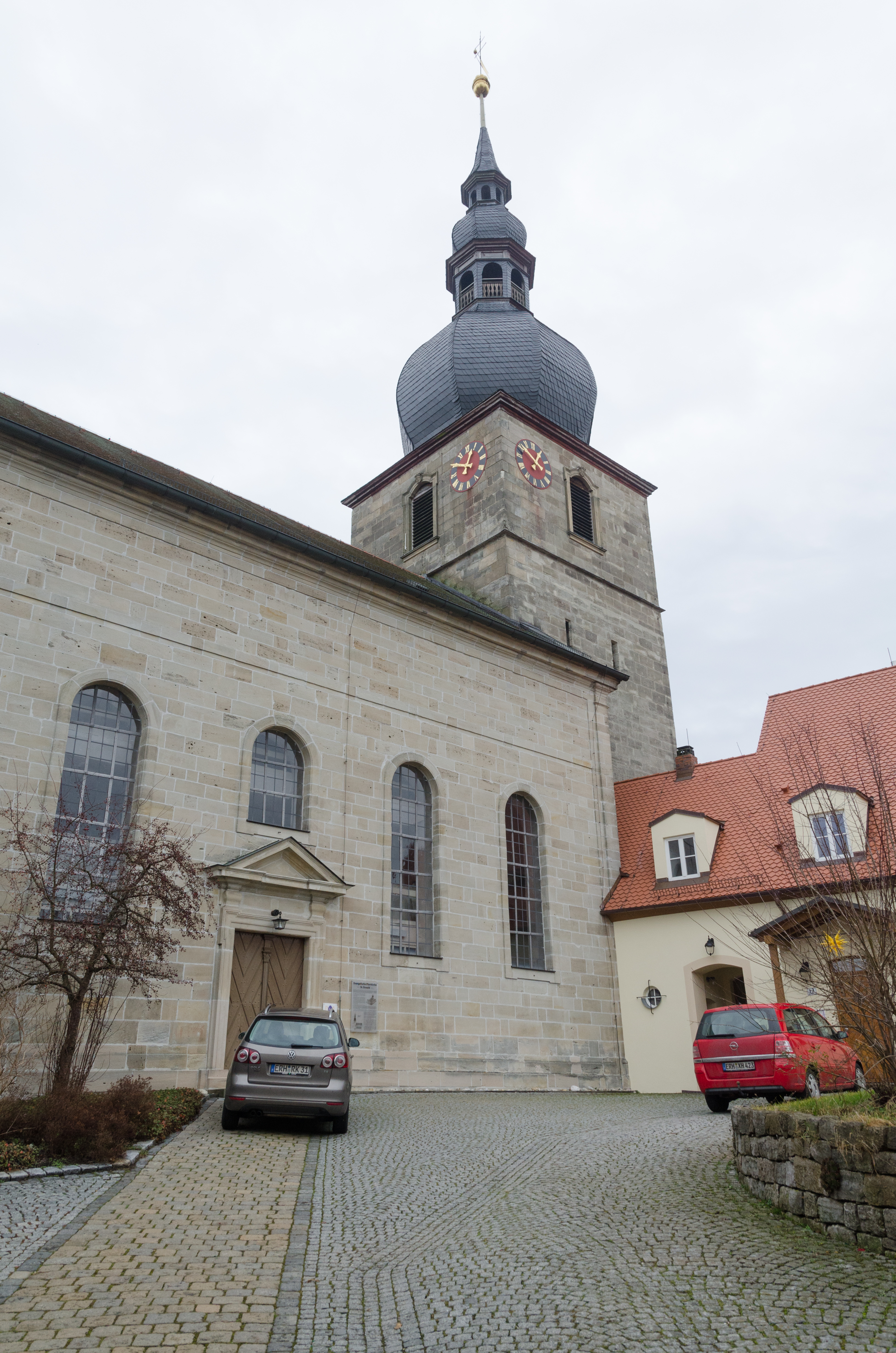
- Church of Saint Oswald

- Coat of arms

- Location of Lonnerstadt within Erlangen-Höchstadt district
- Interactive map of Lonnerstadt
- Location within Germany Location within Bavaria
- Coordinates: 49°42′N 10°46′E
- Country: Germany
- State: Bavaria
- Admin. region: Mittelfranken
- District: Erlangen-Höchstadt
- Municipal assoc.: Höchstadt an der Aisch
- Subdivisions: 4 districts

Government
  - Mayor (2020–26): Regina Bruckmann (FW)

Area
  - Total: 22.71 km^{2} (8.77 sq mi)
- Elevation: 288 m (945 ft)

Population (2025-12-31)
  - Total: 2,065
  - Density: 90.93/km^{2} (235.5/sq mi)
- Time zone: UTC+01:00 (CET)
  - Summer (DST): UTC+02:00 (CEST)
- Postal codes: 91475
- Dialling codes: 09193
- Vehicle registration: ERH
- Website: www.lonnerstadt.de

Lonnerstadt (German pronunciation: [ˈlɔnɐʃtat]) is a municipality in the Erlangen-Höchstadt district of the Middle Franconia (Mittelfranken) region of Bavaria, Germany.
