= Marloffstein =

- Town
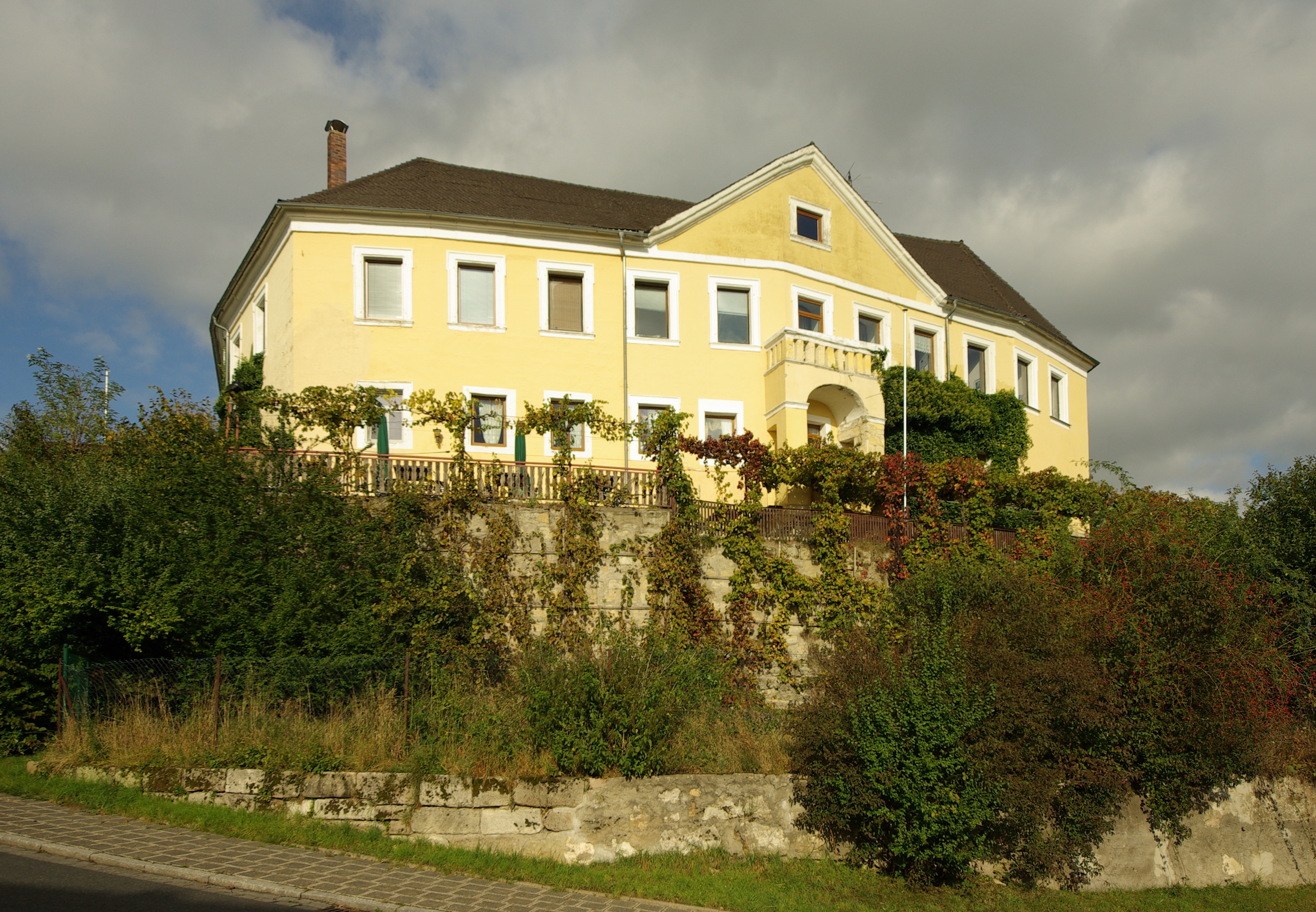
- Marloffstein Palace

- Coat of arms

- Location of Marloffstein within Erlangen-Höchstadt district
- Interactive map of Marloffstein
- Location within Germany Location within Bavaria
- Coordinates: 49°37′N 11°04′E
- Country: Germany
- State: Bavaria
- Admin. region: Mittelfranken
- District: Erlangen-Höchstadt
- Municipal assoc.: Uttenreuth
- Subdivisions: 4 districts

Government
  - Mayor (2020–26): Eduard Walz (FW)

Area
  - Total: 6.63 km^{2} (2.56 sq mi)
- Elevation: 355 m (1,165 ft)

Population (2025-12-31)
  - Total: 1,551
  - Density: 234/km^{2} (606/sq mi)
- Time zone: UTC+01:00 (CET)
  - Summer (DST): UTC+02:00 (CEST)
- Postal codes: 91080
- Dialling codes: 09131
- Vehicle registration: ERH
- Website: www.marloffstein.de

Marloffstein is a town in the district of Erlangen-Höchstadt, in Bavaria, Germany.
