= Hemhofen =

- Municipality
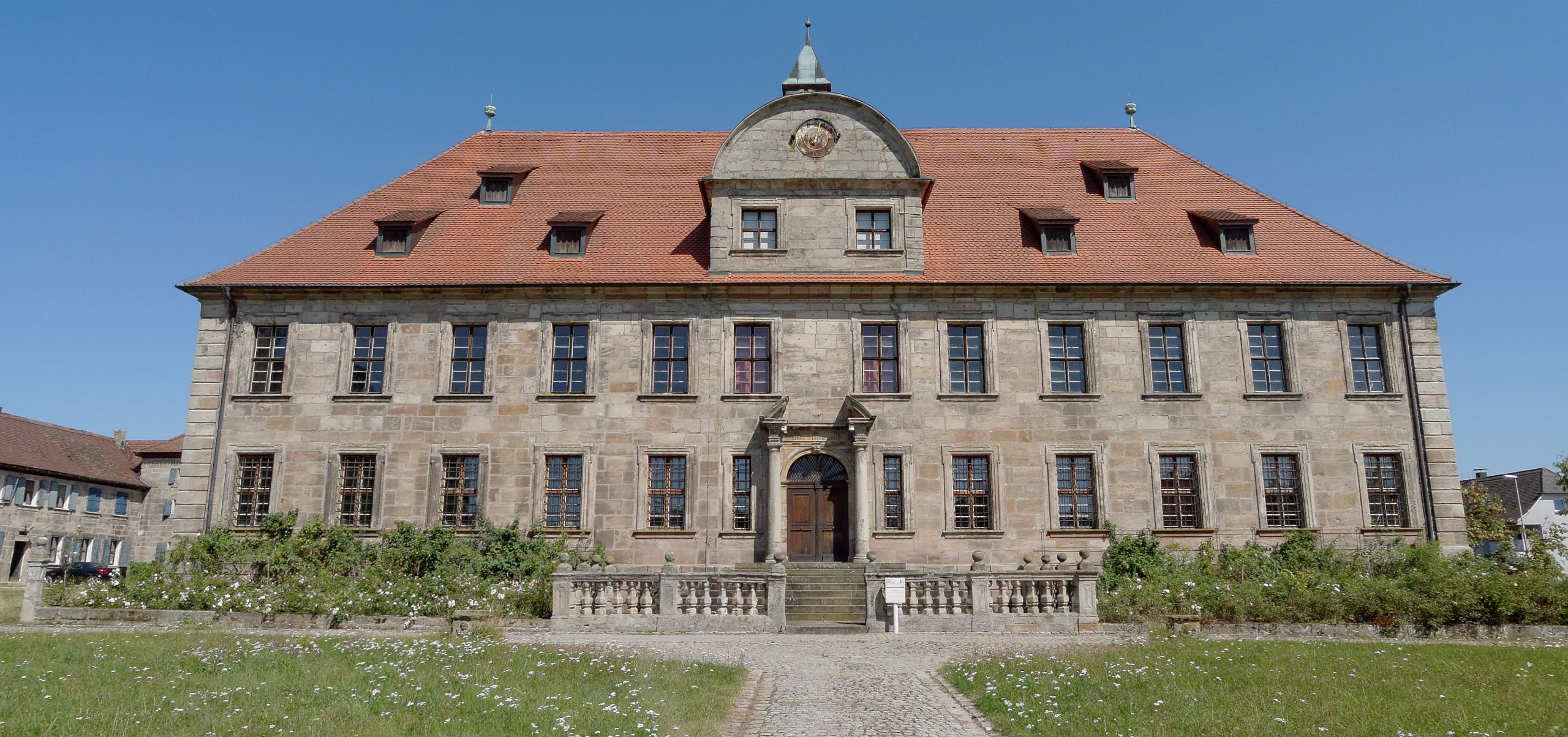
- Hemhofen Palace

- Coat of arms

- Location of Hemhofen within Erlangen-Höchstadt district
- Interactive map of Hemhofen
- Location within Germany Location within Bavaria
- Coordinates: 49°41′N 10°56′E
- Country: Germany
- State: Bavaria
- Admin. region: Mittelfranken
- District: Erlangen-Höchstadt

Government
  - Mayor (2020–26): Ludwig Nagel (CSU)

Area
  - Total: 6.77 km^{2} (2.61 sq mi)
- Elevation: 318 m (1,043 ft)

Population (2025-12-31)
  - Total: 5,177
  - Density: 765/km^{2} (1,980/sq mi)
- Time zone: UTC+01:00 (CET)
  - Summer (DST): UTC+02:00 (CEST)
- Postal codes: 91334
- Dialling codes: 09195
- Vehicle registration: ERH
- Website: www.hemhofen.de

Hemhofen is a municipality in the district of Erlangen-Höchstadt, in Bavaria, Germany.
