= Aurachtal =

- Municipality
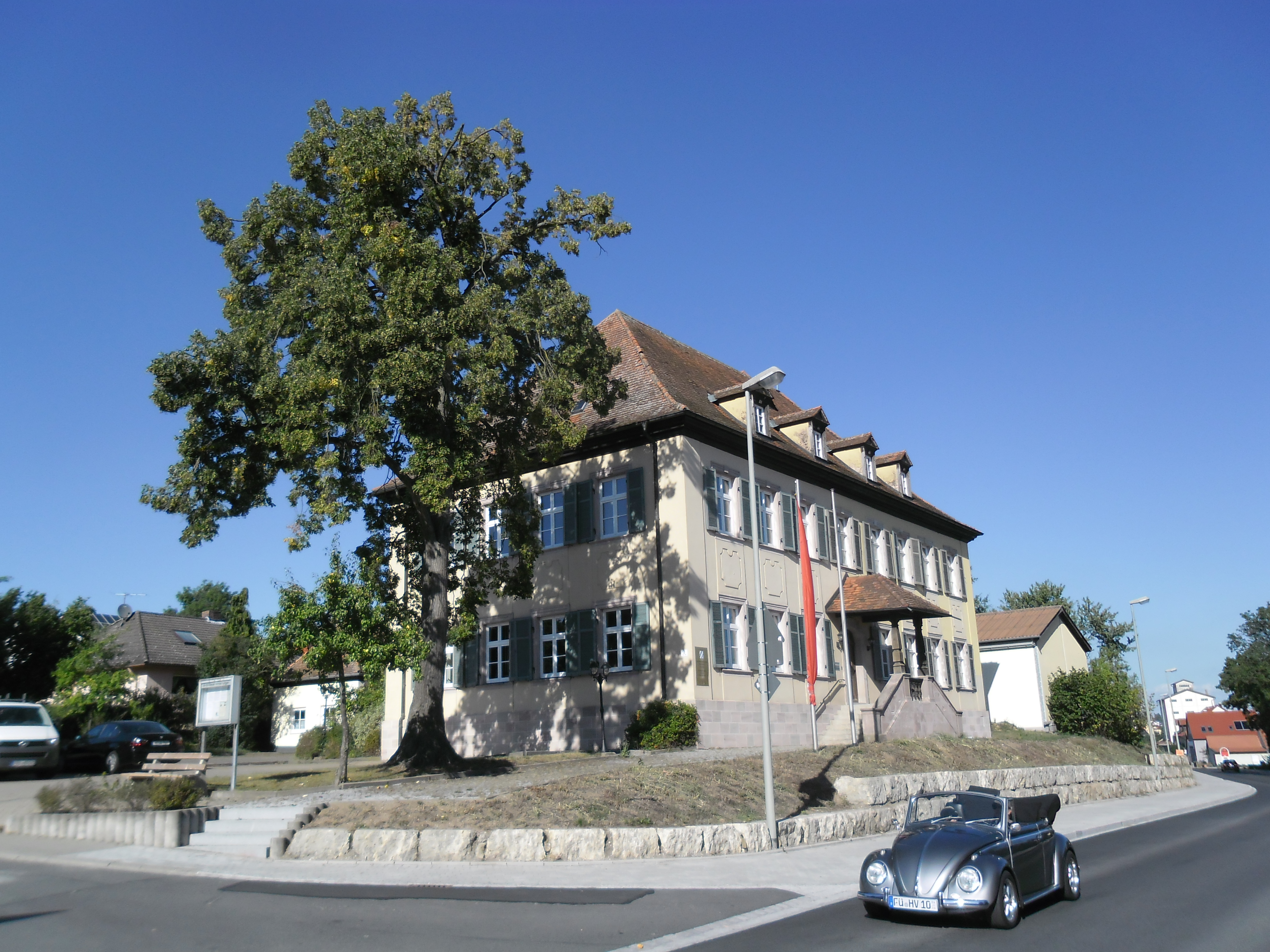
- Town hall

- Coat of arms

- Location of Aurachtal within Erlangen-Höchstadt district
- Interactive map of Aurachtal
- Location within Germany Location within Bavaria
- Coordinates: 49°35′N 10°50′E
- Country: Germany
- State: Bavaria
- Admin. region: Mittelfranken
- District: Erlangen-Höchstadt
- Municipal assoc.: Aurachtal

Government
  - Mayor (2020–26): Klaus Schumann

Area
  - Total: 18.40 km^{2} (7.10 sq mi)
- Elevation: 320 m (1,050 ft)

Population (2025-12-31)
  - Total: 3,131
  - Density: 170.2/km^{2} (440.7/sq mi)
- Time zone: UTC+01:00 (CET)
  - Summer (DST): UTC+02:00 (CEST)
- Postal codes: 91086
- Dialling codes: 09132
- Vehicle registration: ERH
- Website: www.aurachtal.de

Aurachtal is a municipality in the district of Erlangen-Höchstadt, in Bavaria, Germany.

== Personalities ==
- Johann Jakob Palm (1750–1826), died in Münchaurach, German book dealer
- Michael Kreß (1843–1929), Franconian farmer born in Falkendorf, mayor and popular poet
