= Spardorf =

- Town
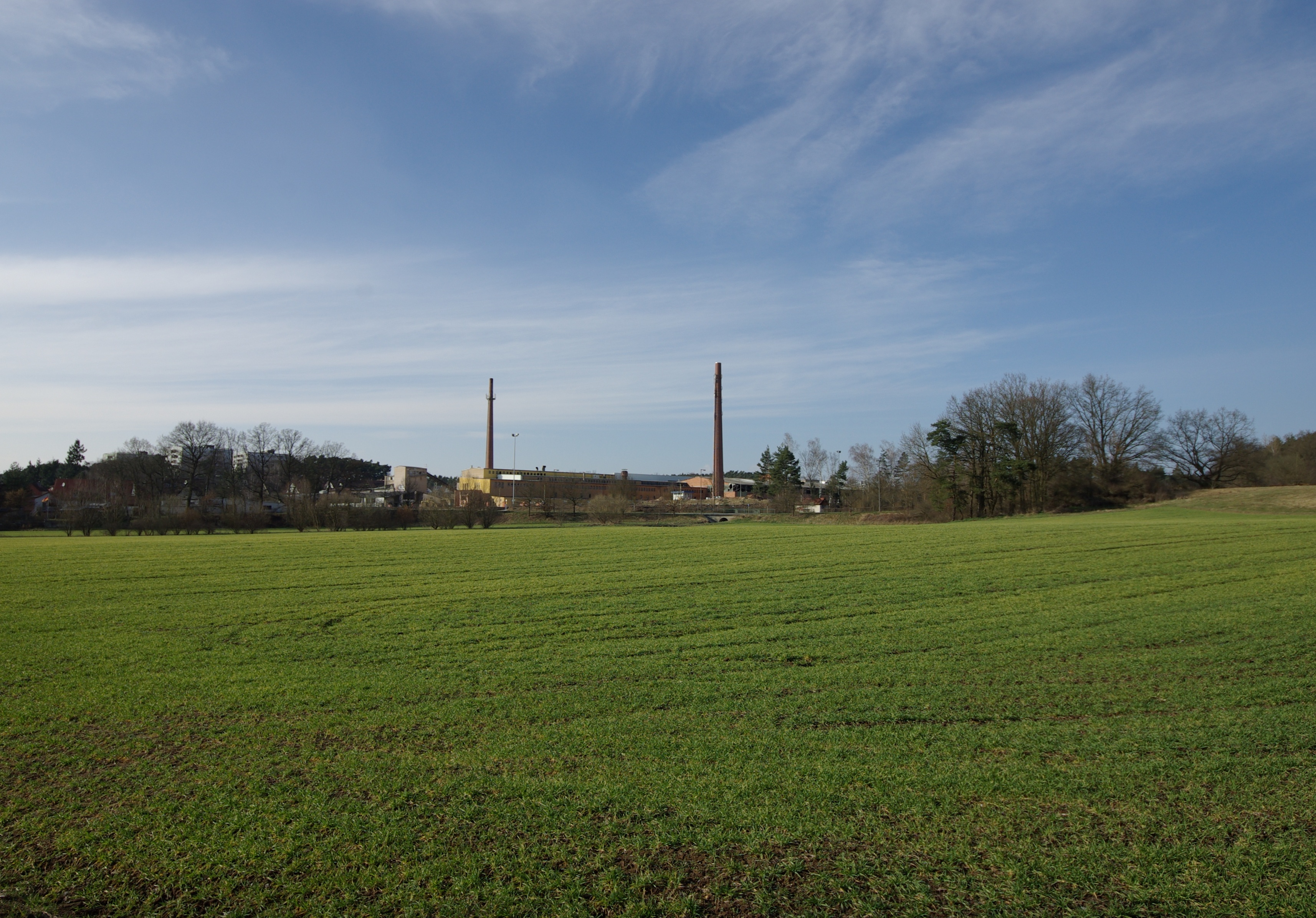
- Former Old Brickyard in 2011

- Coat of arms

- Location of Spardorf within Erlangen-Höchstadt district
- Interactive map of Spardorf
- Location within Germany Location within Bavaria
- Coordinates: 49°37′N 11°3′E
- Country: Germany
- State: Bavaria
- Admin. region: Mittelfranken
- District: Erlangen-Höchstadt
- Municipal assoc.: Uttenreuth

Government
  - Mayor (2020–26): Andreas Wasielewski (SPD)

Area
  - Total: 3.22 km^{2} (1.24 sq mi)
- Elevation: 312 m (1,024 ft)

Population (2025-12-31)
  - Total: 2,278
  - Density: 707/km^{2} (1,830/sq mi)
- Time zone: UTC+01:00 (CET)
  - Summer (DST): UTC+02:00 (CEST)
- Postal codes: 91080
- Dialling codes: 09131
- Vehicle registration: ERH
- Website: www.spardorf.de

Spardorf is a small town in the district of Erlangen-Höchstadt, in Bavaria, Germany.

== Mayor ==
The mayor of Spardorf is Andreas Wasielewski (SPD), elected in March 2020.

== Recent Projects ==
The long-term project of the so-called 'Alte Ziegelei' (Old Brickyard) has been finalised in 2018, and the first store opened on the 25 October 2018. This commercial area can provide many people within a large radius, preventing them from having to travel longer distances and making it very convenient.
