= Adelsdorf, Bavaria =

Adelsdorf
- Municipality
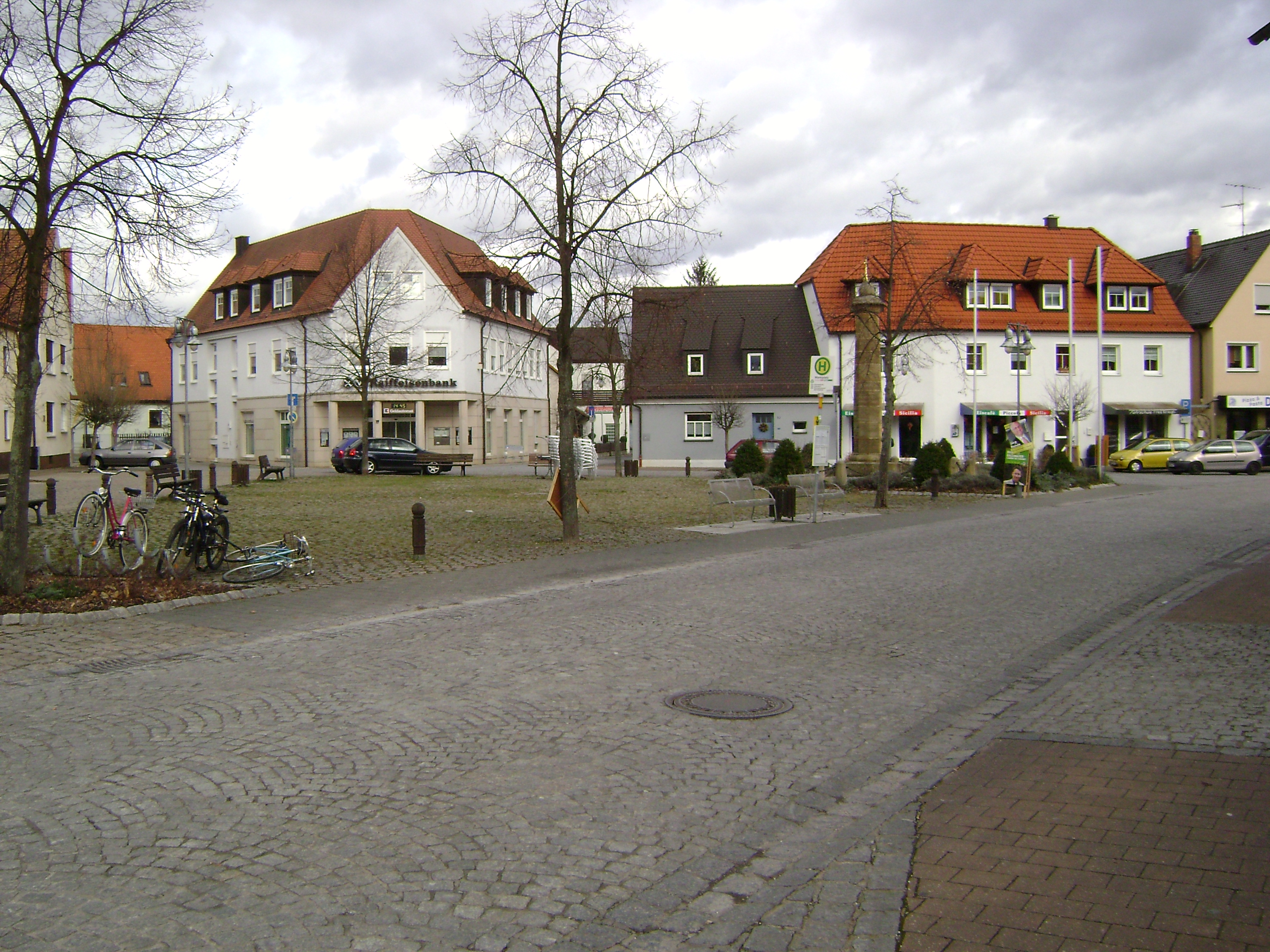
- Market square

- Coat of arms

- Location of Adelsdorf within Erlangen-Höchstadt district
- Interactive map of Adelsdorf
- Location within Germany Location within Bavaria
- Coordinates: 49°43′N 10°54′E
- Country: Germany
- State: Bavaria
- Admin. region: Mittelfranken
- District: Erlangen-Höchstadt
- Subdivisions: 8 Ortsteile

Government
  - Mayor (2020–26): Karsten Fischkal (FW)

Area
  - Total: 31.67 km^{2} (12.23 sq mi)
- Elevation: 264 m (866 ft)

Population (2025-12-31)
  - Total: 9,109
  - Density: 287.6/km^{2} (744.9/sq mi)
- Time zone: UTC+01:00 (CET)
  - Summer (DST): UTC+02:00 (CEST)
- Postal codes: 91325
- Dialling codes: 09195
- Vehicle registration: ERH
- Website: www.adelsdorf.de

Adelsdorf is a municipality in the district of Erlangen-Höchstadt, in Bavaria, Germany.

== Coat of arms ==
The key refers to the Lords of Schlüsselberg who were prominent in the area before they died out in the Middle Ages. The beaver refers to the Bibra family which had the castle of Adelsdorf from 1687 until 1993.

== Twin towns – sister cities ==
Adelsdorf is twinned with:

- Uggiate-Trevano, Italy (1997)
- Feldbach, Styria, Austria (2007)
