= Oberreichenbach, Baden-Württemberg =

German municipality

Oberreichenbach
- Municipality
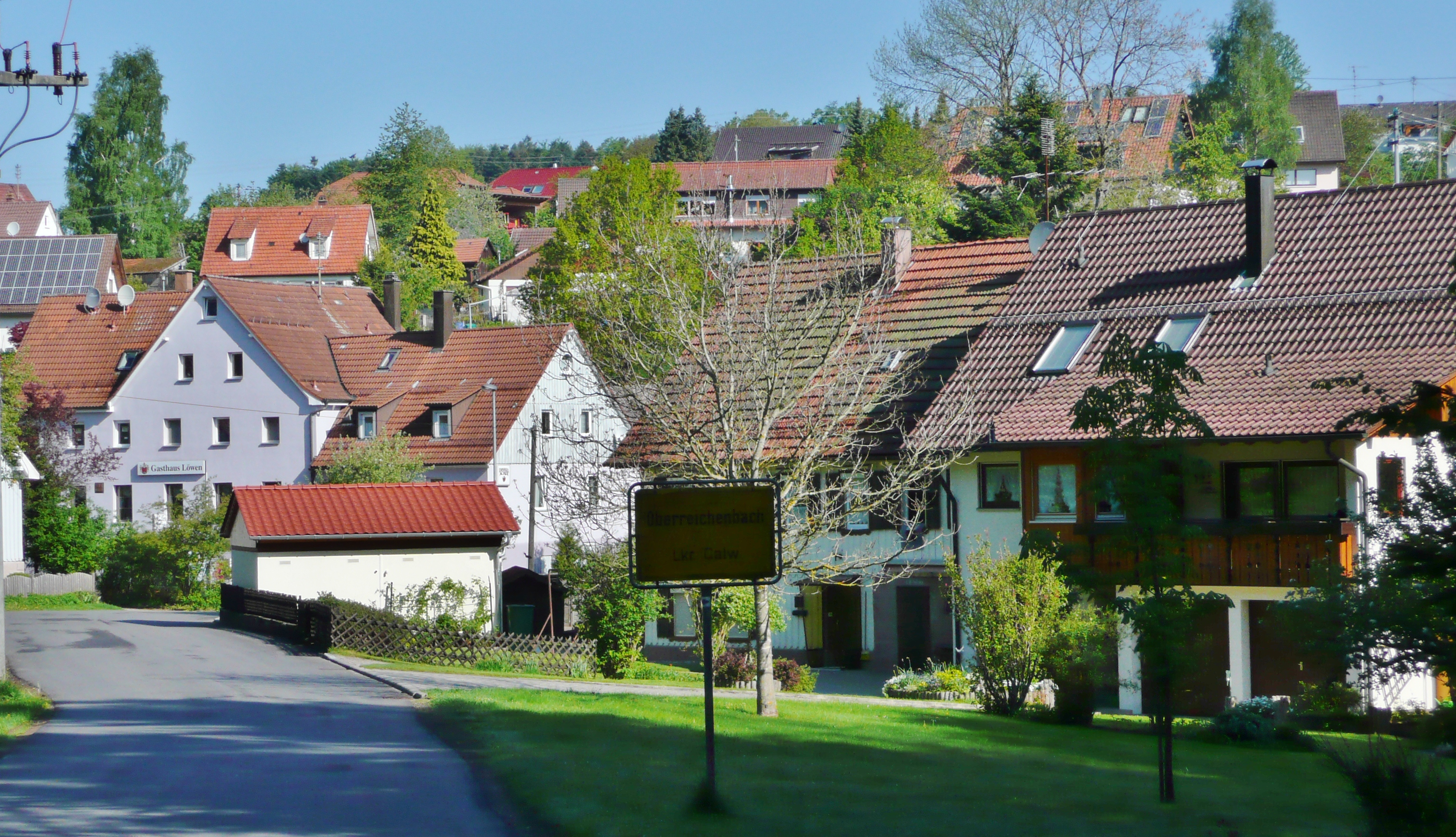
- Oberreichenbach, May 2012

- Coat of arms

- Location of Oberreichenbach within Calw district
- Interactive map of Oberreichenbach
- Location within Germany Location within Baden-Württemberg
- Coordinates: 48°44′3″N 8°39′52″E
- Country: Germany
- State: Baden-Württemberg
- Admin. region: Karlsruhe
- District: Calw

Government
  - Mayor (2024–32): Johannes Schaible

Area
  - Total: 35.99 km^{2} (13.90 sq mi)
- Elevation: 626 m (2,054 ft)

Population (2025-12-31)
  - Total: 3,006
  - Density: 83.52/km^{2} (216.3/sq mi)
- Time zone: UTC+01:00 (CET)
  - Summer (DST): UTC+02:00 (CEST)
- Postal codes: 75394
- Dialling codes: 07051
- Vehicle registration: CW
- Website: www.oberreichenbach.de

Oberreichenbach (German pronunciation: [ˈoːbɐˌʁaɪçn̩bax]) is a municipality in the district of Calw in Baden-Württemberg, Germany.

== History ==
The villages of Oberreichenbach and Oberkollbach were donated in 1303 by the Count of Vaihingen to Hirsau Abbey. 300 years later, the nearby village of Igelsloch became a possession of the Duchy of Württemberg when it purchased the town of Bad Liebenzell. The village of Würzbach also became a possession of Württemberg when it acquired Zavelstein Castle in the early 14th century.

In 1807, Oberreichenbach and Oberkollbach were assigned by the government of the Kingdom of Württemberg to Oberamt Calw, and Igelsloch to Oberamt Neuenbürg in 1809. When these districts were dissolved in 1938, Oberreichenbach, Oberkollbach, Igelsloch, and Würzbach were all assigned to Landkreis Calw. With the exception of Oberkollbach, which grew substantially in the 1960s and 1970s, there was not much development in the modern municipal area after World War II.

In 1974, Oberkollbach and Igelsloch were merged into Oberreichenbach to form a new municipality that was further expanded on 1 January 1975 with Würzbach.

== Geography ==
The municipality (Gemeinde) of Oberreichenbach is situated in the district of Calw, in Baden-Württemberg, one of the 16 States of the Federal Republic of Germany. Oberreichenbach is physically located on the plateaus and in the valleys of the Enz and Nagold. Roughly half of its municipal area is in the Grinde to the west, while the other half is in the Black Forest to the east. Elevation above sea level in the municipal area ranges from a high of 728 meters (2,388 ft) Normalnull (NN) to a low of 460 meters (1,510 ft) NN.

Portions of the Federally protected Hesel, Brand, and Kohl missen and Waldmoor-Torfstich nature reserves are located in Oberreichenbach's municipal area.

== Demographics ==
Population development:

Year	Inhabitants
1990	2,645
2001	2,856
2011	2,799
2021	2,931

== Politics ==
Oberreichenbach has four boroughs (Ortsteile), Igelsloch, Oberkollbach, Obrerreichenbach, and Würzbach, and four villages: Kunstmühle, Naislach, Siehdichfür, Unterkollbach. In addition, the minor administrative unit of Eberspiel and the abandoned village of Oberwürzbach are found in the municipal area. Oberreichenbach is in a mutually-beneficial municipal association with the city of Calw.

=== Coat of arms ===
Oberreichenbach's municipal coat of arms shows four green fir trees rooted to a field of yellow, above a blue, wavy fess and a checkboard pattern of five red squares and five yellow squares at the base of the blazon. This pattern is largely a combination of the coats of arms of Oberkollbach and Würzbach, as Oberreichenbach did not actually have a coat of arms. The wavy fess is a reference to the names Oberreichenbach, Oberkollbach, Würzbach, and Unterkollbach, as bach means "stream" in German. The four trees reference the Black Forest and references the name Igelsloch, derived from "loh", an old German word for "forest". The checkerboard pattern is taken from the arms of the Lords of Zavelstein. The municipal coat of arms was approved by the Calw district office on 5 September 1983.

== Transportation ==
Oberreichenbach is connected to Germany's network of roadways by Bundesstraße 296. Local public transportation is provided by the Verkehrsgesellschaft Bäderkreis Calw.
