= Oberreichenbach, Bavaria =

Oberreichenbach
- Municipality
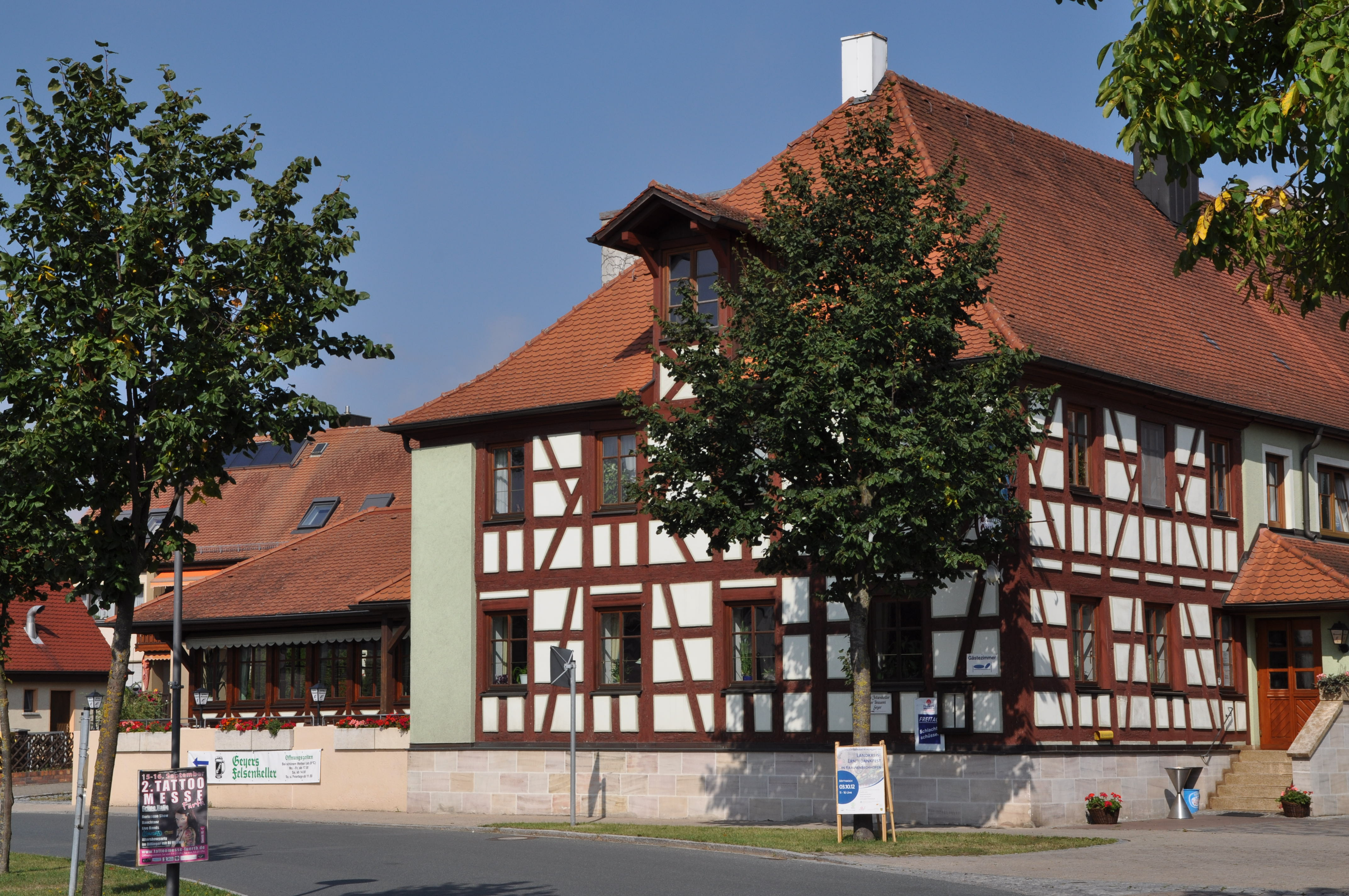
- Geyer Brewery

- Coat of arms

- Location of Oberreichenbach within Erlangen-Höchstadt district
- Interactive map of Oberreichenbach
- Location within Germany Location within Bavaria
- Coordinates: 49°35′20″N 10°46′12″E
- Country: Germany
- State: Bavaria
- Admin. region: Mittelfranken
- District: Erlangen-Höchstadt
- Municipal assoc.: Aurachtal

Government
  - Mayor (2020–26): Klaus Hacker (FW)

Area
  - Total: 4.83 km^{2} (1.86 sq mi)
- Elevation: 353 m (1,158 ft)

Population (2025-12-31)
  - Total: 1,334
  - Density: 276/km^{2} (715/sq mi)
- Time zone: UTC+01:00 (CET)
  - Summer (DST): UTC+02:00 (CEST)
- Postal codes: 91097
- Dialling codes: 09104
- Vehicle registration: ERH
- Website: www.oberreichenbach-erh.de

Oberreichenbach (German pronunciation: [ˈoːbɐˌʁaɪçn̩bax]) is a municipality in the district of Erlangen-Höchstadt, in Bavaria, Germany.
