= Marketplace (disambiguation) =

A marketplace is a location where people regularly gather for the purchase and sale of provisions, livestock, and other goods.

Marketplace or Market Place may also refer to:

== Buildings ==
- Historic Market Place, Hildesheim, a historical structure in Lower Saxony, Germany
- Market Place Shopping Center, a shopping mall in Champaign, Illinois, US
- The Market Place (Orange County, California), a shopping mall in Tustin and Irvine, California, US
- The Market Place (restaurant), a restaurant in Asheville, North Carolina, US
- The Marketplace Mall, a shopping mall near Rochester, New York, US

== Media ==
- Marketplace (Canadian TV program), a Canadian consumer advocacy newsmagazine television program which has been broadcast on CBC since 1972
- Marketplace (Irish TV programme), a 1987–1996 Irish finance and business current affairs television programme that aired on RTÉ
- Marketplace (radio program), an American radio program that has been broadcast since 1989
- The Marketplace (series), an erotic novel series
- "Marketplace" (song), a 1985 song by the American punk rock band the Proletariat

== Public squares and parks ==
- Market square, an area in a town
- Market Place, Devizes, a town square in Wiltshire, England
- Market Place, Garstang, a public square in Lancashire, England
- Market Place, Poulton-le-Fylde, a public square in Lancashire
- Market Place, Stockport, a market square in Greater Manchester, England
- Market Place, Warwick, an open space in Warwickshire, England
- Victoria Square, Christchurch, a public park in New Zealand, previously known as "Market Place"

== Retail chains ==
- The MarketPlace, a grocery store chain in Bermuda
- Market Place (supermarket), a supermarket chain in Asia

== Streets and roads ==
- Market Place, Finchley, a road and former pig market in north London
- Market Place, a section of the A1 road in London

== Technology ==
- Facebook Marketplace, a local buy‑and‑sell service
- Lotus Marketplace, a database program
- Online marketplace, in e-commerce, such as an online trading community and online auctions
- Second Life Marketplace, online shopping site for Second Life
- Windows Phone Marketplace, a former digital distribution platform
- Xbox Live Marketplace, a former digital distribution platform

== Other uses ==
- Health insurance marketplace, previously known as health insurance exchange, a set of government-regulated and standardized health care plans in the US
- Marketplace of ideas: the virtual interplay of competing thought
- Marketplace ministry: an aspect of Transformational Christianity

== See also ==
- Market (disambiguation), a word sometimes interchangeable with "marketplace"
- Marketplace Mall (disambiguation)
