= Market =

Market may refer to:

- Market (economics), system in which parties engage in transactions according to supply and demand
- Market economy
- Marketplace, a physical marketplace or public market
- Marketing, the act of satisfying and retaining customers

Market(s) or The Market(s) may also refer to:

== Geography ==
- Märket, an island shared by Finland and Sweden

== Art, entertainment, and media ==
=== Films ===
- Market (1965 film), 1965 South Korean film
- Market (2003 film), 2003 Hindi film
- The Market: A Tale of Trade, a Turkish film

=== Television ===
- The Market (TV series), a New Zealand television drama
- "Markets" (Bluey), an episode of the first season of the animated TV series Bluey

== Brands or enterprises ==
- The Market (company), a concept grocery store
- The Market, a specialized Safeway store

== Types of economic markets ==
- Agricultural marketing
- Emerging market
- Energy market
- Financial market
- Foreign exchange market
- Grey market, commodity trade outside of original producer's distribution channel
- Media market, geographic area with mostly the same set of media outlets
- Niche market
- Open market, a free trade economy; the antonym of closed market
- Prediction market
- Real estate market
- Stock market
- Wholesale marketing

=== Aspects of economic markets ===
- Efficient-market hypothesis, economic theory that asset prices fully reflect all available information
- Mark-to-market accounting
- Market capitalization, total value of a public company's outstanding shares
- Market failure
- Market maker
- Market microstructure
- Market research
- Market segmentation
- Market share
- Market trend
- Market value
- Single market
- Target market

== Types of physical markets ==
- Bazaar
- Big box market
- Farmers' market, focusing on fresh food
- Fish market
- Flea market, for used items
- Floating market
- Grocery store
- Hypermarket
- Market square
- Market town
- Marketplace
- Night market
- Public market (disambiguation)
- Supermarket
- Wet market, focusing on fresh meat, fish, produce, and other perishable goods
- World Market

== See also ==
- Marketplace (disambiguation), a word sometimes interchangeable with "market"
- Markt (disambiguation)
- Marquette (disambiguation)
- Mercado (disambiguation), the Spanish and Portuguese word for market
- The Marketts
- The Title Market (1909), a book by Emily Post
