= Main Square =

Main Square may refer to:

- Main Square, Plzeň
- Main Square (Bratislava)
- Main Square, Kraków
- Main Square, Maribor
- Main Square Festival, named after the Grand-Place in Arras, France
- Main Square (Toronto), a building complex

== See also ==
- Town square
- Market square
- City square (disambiguation)
- Plaza Mayor (disambiguation) (Spanish)
- Grand-Place (French)
- Grote Markt (disambiguation) (Dutch)
- Hauptplatz (disambiguation) (German)
