= Markt =

Markt may refer to:

- Aktueller Software Markt
- Christkindl Markt
- Media Markt
- Rahela Markt

== Places in Germany ==
- Markt Berolzheim
- Markt Bibart
- Markt Einersheim
- Markt Erlbach
- Markt Indersdorf
- Markt Nordheim
- Markt Rettenbach
- Markt Schwaben
- Markt Simbach
- Markt Taschendorf
- Markt Wald
- Hackescher Markt
- Stetten am kalten Markt
- Wiener Markt

== Places in Austria ==
- Markt Allhau
- Markt Hartmannsdorf
- Markt Neuhodis
- Markt Piesting
- Markt Sankt Martin
- Aschbach-Markt
- Aspang-Markt

== Other places ==
- Markt (Alsfeld)
- Markt (Bruges)
- Markt (Rosmalen)
- Markt Eisenstein

== See also ==
- Grote Markt (disambiguation)
- Markt station (disambiguation)
- Mark (disambiguation)
- Market (disambiguation)
