= Mercado =

Mercado is the Portuguese and Spanish word for market. It may refer to:

== Public markets ==
- Mercado de las Carnes, a former meat market in Ponce, Puerto Rico
- Mercado Central, Valencia, a public market in Valencia, Spain
- Mercado Central de Santiago, the central market of Santiago de Chile
- Mercado Jamaica, Mexico City, a traditional market in Mexico City
- Mercado Modelo (Montevideo), a central fruit and vegetable wholesale market in Montevideo
- Mercado de Sonora, a traditional market in Mexico City

== People with the surname ==
- Gabriel Mercado, Argentine footballer
- Jennylyn Mercado (born 1987), Filipino actress
- Jerges Mercado Suárez, Bolivian politician
- Joseph Mercado, Filipino academic
- Juan Miguel Mercado, Spanish cyclist
- Lionel Jr. "L. J." Figueroa Mercado (born 1998), Dominican-American basketball player
- Luis Edgardo Mercado Jarrín, Peruvian politician
- Mai Mercado (born 1980), Danish politician
- Melinda Mercado, American soccer player
- Michael Mercado (born 1999), American baseball player
- Mónico R. Mercado (1875–1952), Filipino lawyer and politician
- Noel Kempff Mercado, Bolivian biologist
- Oscar Mercado, baseball player
- Scarleth Mercado, Nicaraguan weightlifter
- Walter Mercado, Puerto Rican astrologer

== Other ==
- De Mercado, a Spanish surname
- Mercado Integrado Latinoamericano, a program to integrate the stock exchange markets of Chile, Colombia and Peru
- Mercado a Término de Buenos Aires, the Buenos Aires Futures and Options Exchange

== See also ==
- Mercato (disambiguation)
- Market (disambiguation)
- Markt (disambiguation)
