= Scheinfeld =

- Town
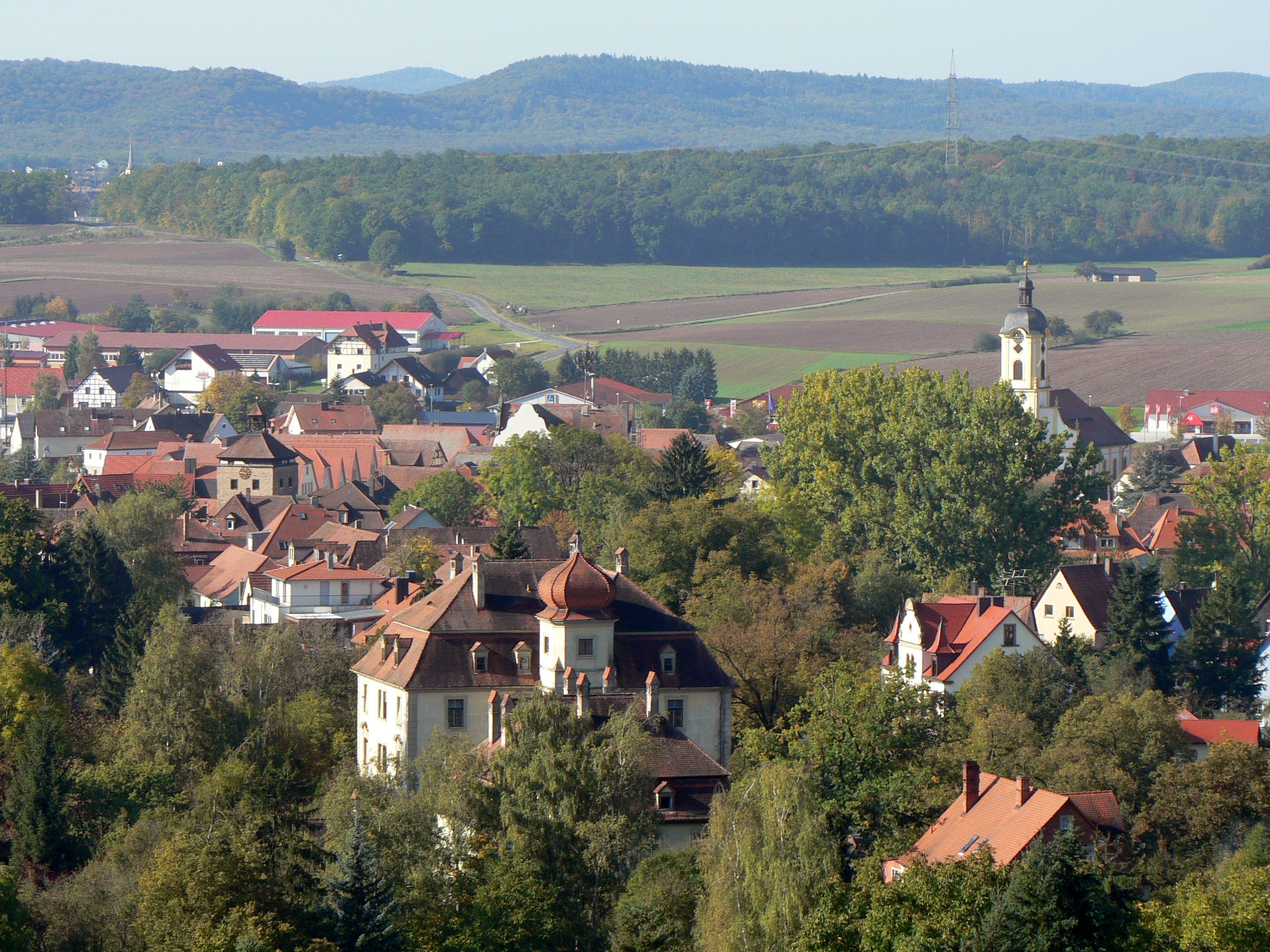
- Eastern view

- Coat of arms

- Location of Scheinfeld within Neustadt a.d.Aisch-Bad Windsheim district
- Interactive map of Scheinfeld
- Location within Germany Location within Bavaria
- Coordinates: 49°40′N 10°28′E
- Country: Germany
- State: Bavaria
- Admin. region: Mittelfranken
- District: Neustadt a.d.Aisch-Bad Windsheim
- Municipal assoc.: Scheinfeld
- Subdivisions: 13 Ortsteile

Government
  - Mayor (2020–26): Claus Seifert (SPD)

Area
  - Total: 45.12 km^{2} (17.42 sq mi)
- Elevation: 304 m (997 ft)

Population (2025-12-31)
  - Total: 4,516
  - Density: 100.1/km^{2} (259.2/sq mi)
- Time zone: UTC+01:00 (CET)
  - Summer (DST): UTC+02:00 (CEST)
- Postal codes: 91443
- Dialling codes: 09162
- Vehicle registration: NEA (until 1972: SEF)
- Website: www.scheinfeld.de

Scheinfeld (German pronunciation: [ˈʃaɪnfɛlt]; East Franconian: Schafld) is a town in the Neustadt (Aisch)-Bad Windsheim district, in Bavaria, Germany. It is situated 14 km northwest of Neustadt (Aisch), and 40 km east of Würzburg. Schloss Schwarzenberg is adjacent to the town. The town is home to an Adidas testing factory.

From 1946 to 1949 a displaced persons camp was in operation at Scheinfeld. About 1,500 Lithuanians were brought there from the Regensburg camp. The camp was a center of Lithuanian culture and also had a short lived community currency.

== Gallery ==
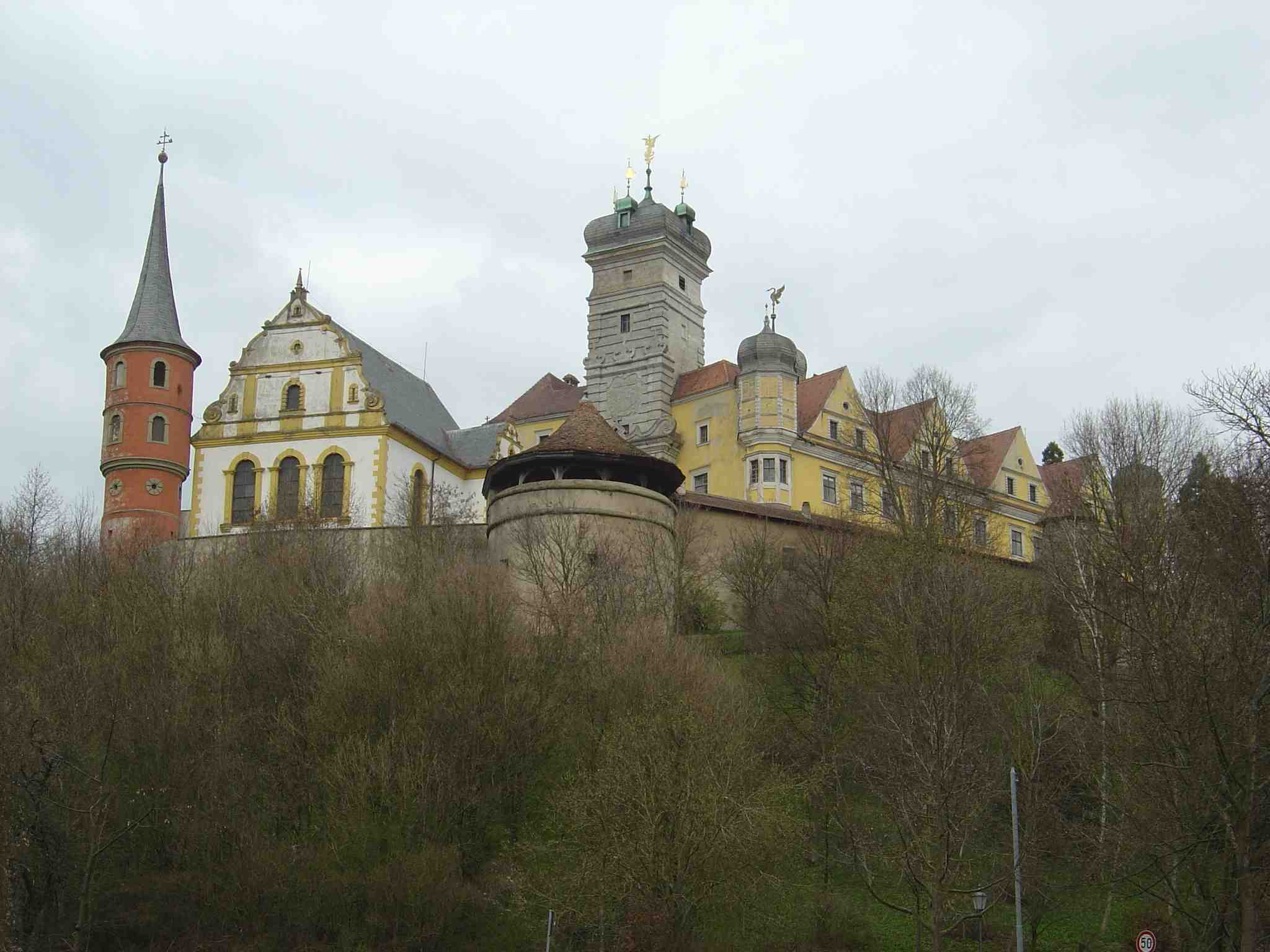
Schloss Schwarzenberg near Scheinfeld

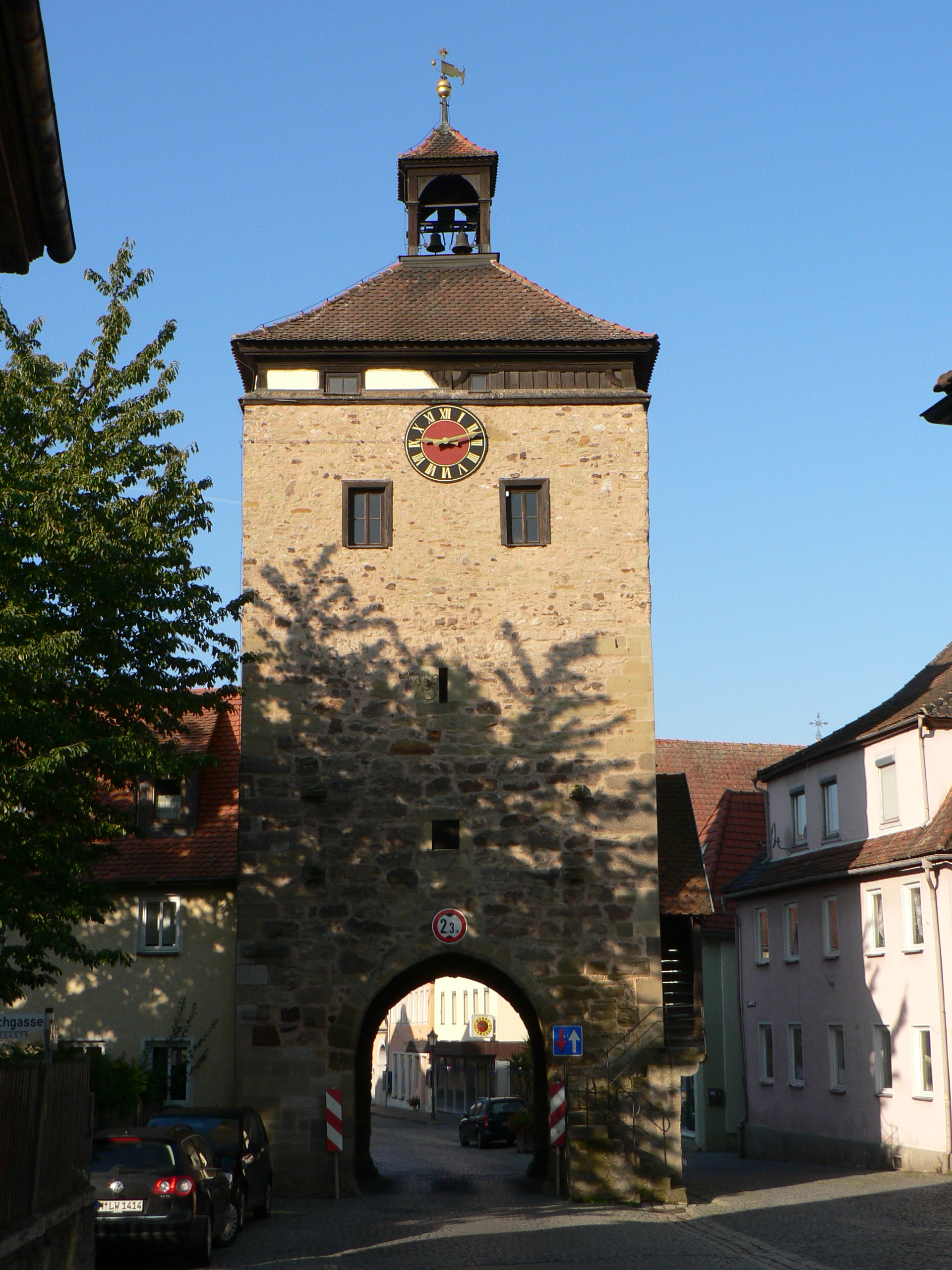
Town gate

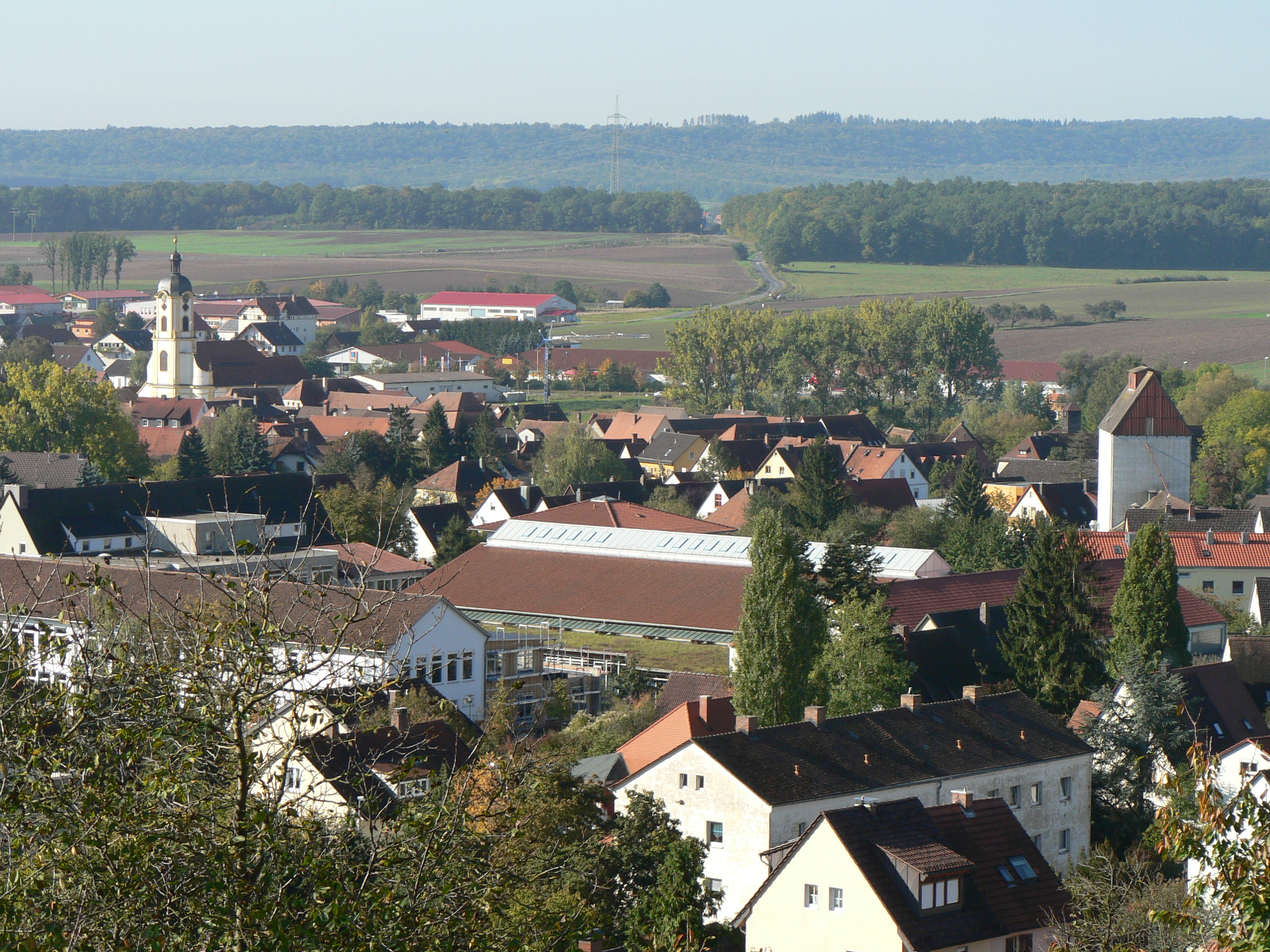
Northern view
