= Andreas Bierschock =

German presenter

Andreas Bierschock is a German presenter. He became known for his appearances on the RTL II program Der Trödeltrupp.

== Life ==
Bierschock first came into contact with the junk trade through his father, who had been working in the business for over 30 years. As a child, he was taken to flea markets and was allowed to follow auctions. Growing up, however, his interest waned and Bierschock trained to be a chef.

Bierschock took over his father's business. The Monsieur Brocante is located in Neustadt an der Aisch and was the subject of a report of the Frankenschau aktuell of BR television in 2011.

Since 2015, Bierschock has been part of the moderator team of the format Der Trödeltrupp.

== Television appearances ==
- since 2015: Der Trödeltrupp
