= Scheinfeld (Verwaltungsgemeinschaft) =

- Verwaltungsgemeinschaft
- Location of Scheinfeld within Neustadt (Aisch)-Bad Windsheim district
- Interactive map of Scheinfeld
- Location within Germany Location within Bavaria
- Coordinates: 49°40′N 10°28′E
- Country: Germany
- State: Bavaria
- Admin. region: Middle Franconia
- District: Neustadt (Aisch)-Bad Windsheim
- Seat: Scheinfeld
- Subdivisions: 6 municipalities

Area
  - Total: 215.74 km^{2} (83.30 sq mi)

Population (2025-12-31)
  - Total: 11,767
  - Density: 54.543/km^{2} (141.26/sq mi)
- Time zone: UTC+01:00 (CET)
  - Summer (DST): UTC+02:00 (CEST)
- Website: www.vgem-scheinfeld.de

Scheinfeld is a Verwaltungsgemeinschaft (municipal association) in the district Neustadt (Aisch)-Bad Windsheim in Bavaria, Germany. Its seat is in Scheinfeld.

It consists of the following municipalities:

1. Langenfeld
2. Markt Bibart
3. Markt Taschendorf
4. Oberscheinfeld
5. Scheinfeld
6. Sugenheim
