= Marketplace Mall =

Marketplace Mall may refer to one of the following shopping malls in the United States:

- Marketplace Mall (Winston-Salem), North Carolina
- The Marketplace Mall, near Rochester, New York
- Market Place Mall, in Champaign, Illinois
