= Peter Kolbe =

German teacher, astronomer, ethnologist, and explorer (1675–1726)

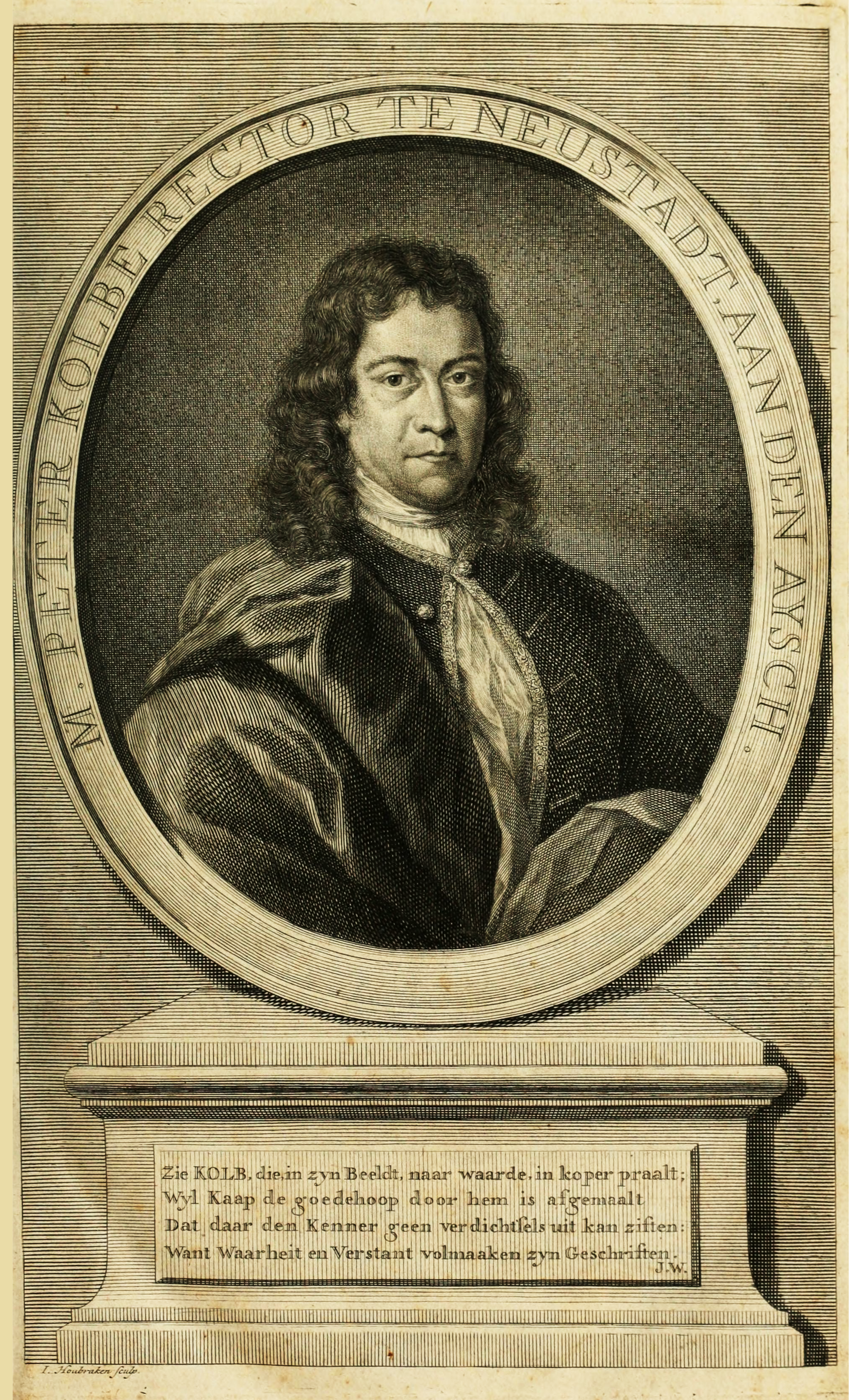
Portrait of Peter Kolbe, 1727

Peter Kolbe (also referred to as Kolb and Kolben) (10 October 1675 in Marktredwitz – 31 December 1726 in Neustadt an der Aisch) was a German teacher, astronomer, ethnologist, traveller, and explorer of South Africa. His major work was the book Caput bonae spei hodiernum (1719) in which he provided detailed descriptions of Khoikhoi life which differed significantly in perception from the descriptions of earlier travellers. He compared European culture and beliefs with those of the Khoikhoi. An English translation, by Guido Medley, was published in 1731.

== Life and work ==
Peter Kolbe was born in a village Dorflas just outside Marktredwitz near Bayreuth, the son of a blacksmith and customs collector. He was educated at Bayreuth, Redwitz and Wunsiedel. He received support from patrons after the death of his father and went to Nuremberg. In Nuremberg he worked from 1696 for the scholar Georg Christoph Eimmart who had built his own astronomical observatory. He chose Kolb as its conservator. Eimmart and his connections suggested that Kolbe should study at the University of Halle and he did so and studied natural sciences and oriental languages (mainly Hebrew). Education also included theology under August Hermann Francke (1663-1727). He received a doctorate in 1701 for a dissertation on comets. He subsequently gave lectures in mathematics and astronomy. He was offered a position in Moscow but became a private tutor to the sons of the Prussian Privy Councillor Baron Friedrich Freiherr von Krosick (1656-1714). Krosick sponsored his visit to the Cape of Good Hope to make astronomical observations, more particularly the determination of longitudes at sea. Kolbe was provided letters of introduction from Nicolaas Witsen, mayor of Amsterdam, with a mandate to compile a comprehensive description of South Africa and for astronomical and surveying research. Kolbe then sailed out of Texel in 1705 and returned only in 1712 as his eyesight deteriorated. He then received glasses from Christian Louis Göckel, a physician in Baden-Baden, which allowed him to continue reading and writing. In 1718 he worked in a grammar school in Neustadt and the next year he published in Nuremberg the Caput Bonae Spei Hodiernum (1719). Several translation were later made.

== Work ==
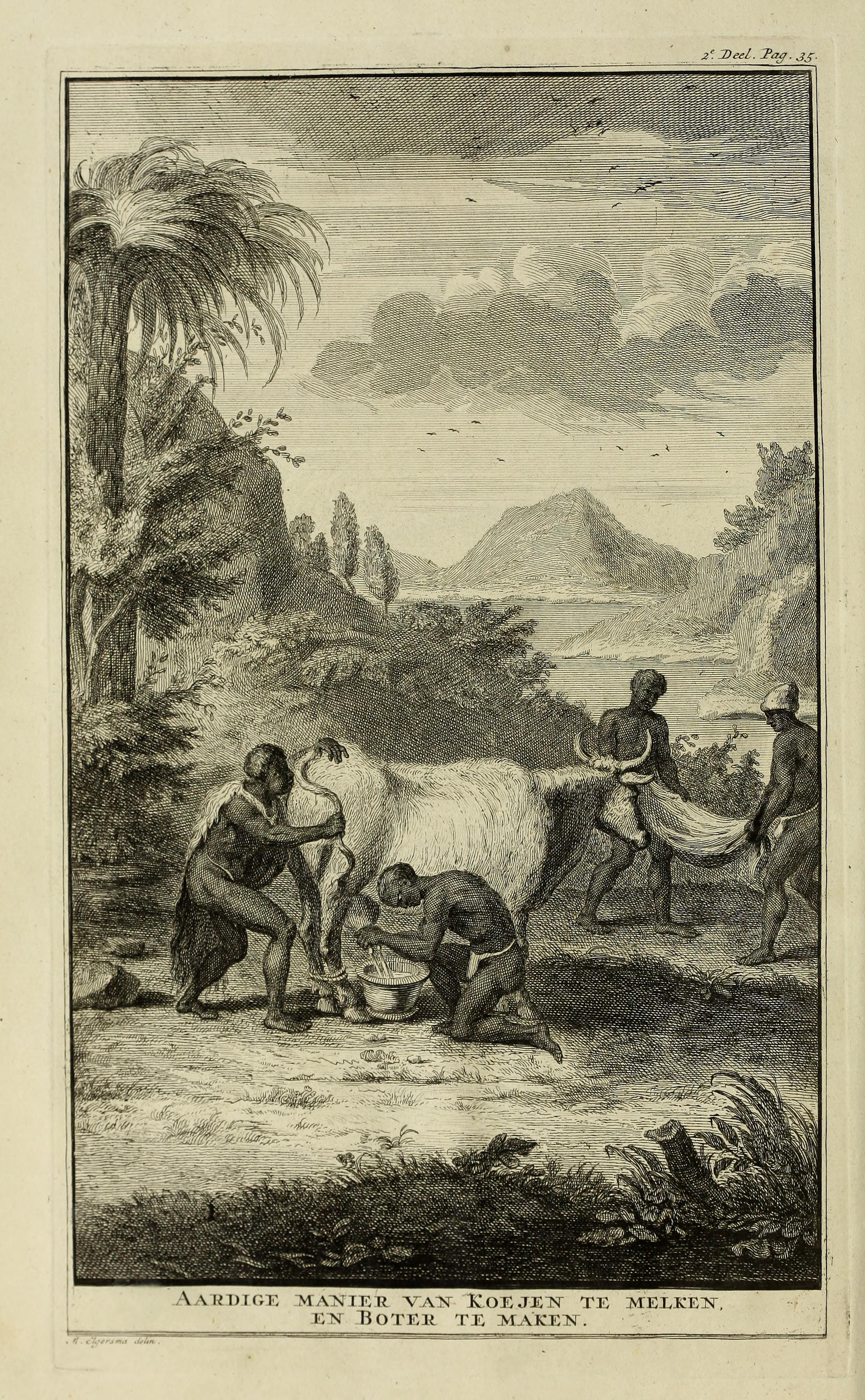
Method of stimulating milk production

Kolbe's book was produced in Nuremberg by Peter Conrad Monath. The book was dedicated to Margrave Georg Wilhelm of Ansbach-Bayreuth. His book was divided into three sections dealing with natural history, the social life of the Khoikhoi, and then the settler colony. The second part was considered the most interesting by most European readers.

Kolbe's description of the Cape fauna was also of some interest. In the Dutch edition, Naauwkeurige beschryving van de Kaap de Goede Hoop published in Amsterdam in 1727, his account devotes 45 pages to mammals, 22 to birds, 24 to fishes, and 20 pages to snakes, insects and other animals. Like many writers of natural history of the period, he was prone to including exaggerated tales. His discovery and description of a giraffe elicited much interest in Europe, and even though Julius Caesar had brought one to Rome in about 46 BC, nobody had produced compelling proof of the existence of this rather improbable creature. He documented the raids of armed Europeans on the peaceful Khoikhoi villages. He wrote (translated) that "they would better have deserved the name of gangsters and highwaymen than that of traders. It is a harsh expression that I am using here; but their deeds deserve no milder term as surely the innocent blood that was shed still cries for revenge. For they arrived as friends but behaved themselves as enemies. Instead of the necessary and honest payment they grasped their muskets and fired on them (i. e. the Khoikhoi). They ran their sword through everyone who was in their way. Whole kraals or Hottentot villages were pillaged, and those who could not flee had to hide themselves here and there and seek safety in the face of the cruelty of their hostile friends."

Kolbe's book was translated into English in 1731 by Guido Medley. An abridgement was also published by Thomas Astley in 1746. Astley included a preface which he described Kolbe's discovery of the Khoikhoi to be "some of the most humane and virtuous (abating for a few Prejudices of Education) to be found among all the Race of Mankind." Kolbe considered his model travel writer to be Robert Knox who wrote on Ceylon.

"Several country residences, vineyards and gardens are located on various sides of Table Mountain. The Company maintains two extensive gardens here. In one of them, built at the Company's expense, is a residence for the Governor, and near it is a grove of oaks called the Round-Bush from which this garden (Rondebosch) takes its name. The other garden, located at a distance from the first, is called Newland because it was recently planted. Both these gardens are supplied with water by the springs on Table Mountain and the Company receives a significant income from them."

Among the discoveries made from Kolbe's book has been the practice of milk stimulation in cows followed by the Khoikhoi. The suckling of calves stimulates the production of oxytocin but when the calf is lost or separated, milk production requires artificial stimulation. A woodcut in Kolbe's book shows the inflation of the cow's vagina in order to stimulate milk production.

Kolbe's book also provides early descriptions of Cape Town: "Several beautiful country seats, vineyards and gardens are to be seen on almost every side of the Table-Hill. The Company has here two very spacious, rich and beautiful Gardens. In one of them stands, erected at the Company's Expense, a noble Pleasure-House for the Governor, and near it a beautiful Grove of Oaks, called the Round-Bush from which this Garden (Rondebosch) takes its Name, being called the Round-Bush garden. The other Garden which is at some distance from this is called Newland because but lately planted. Both these gardens are finely watered by the Springs on the Table-Hill and the Company draws from them a very considerable Revenue."
