= Neustadt an der Aisch =

- Town
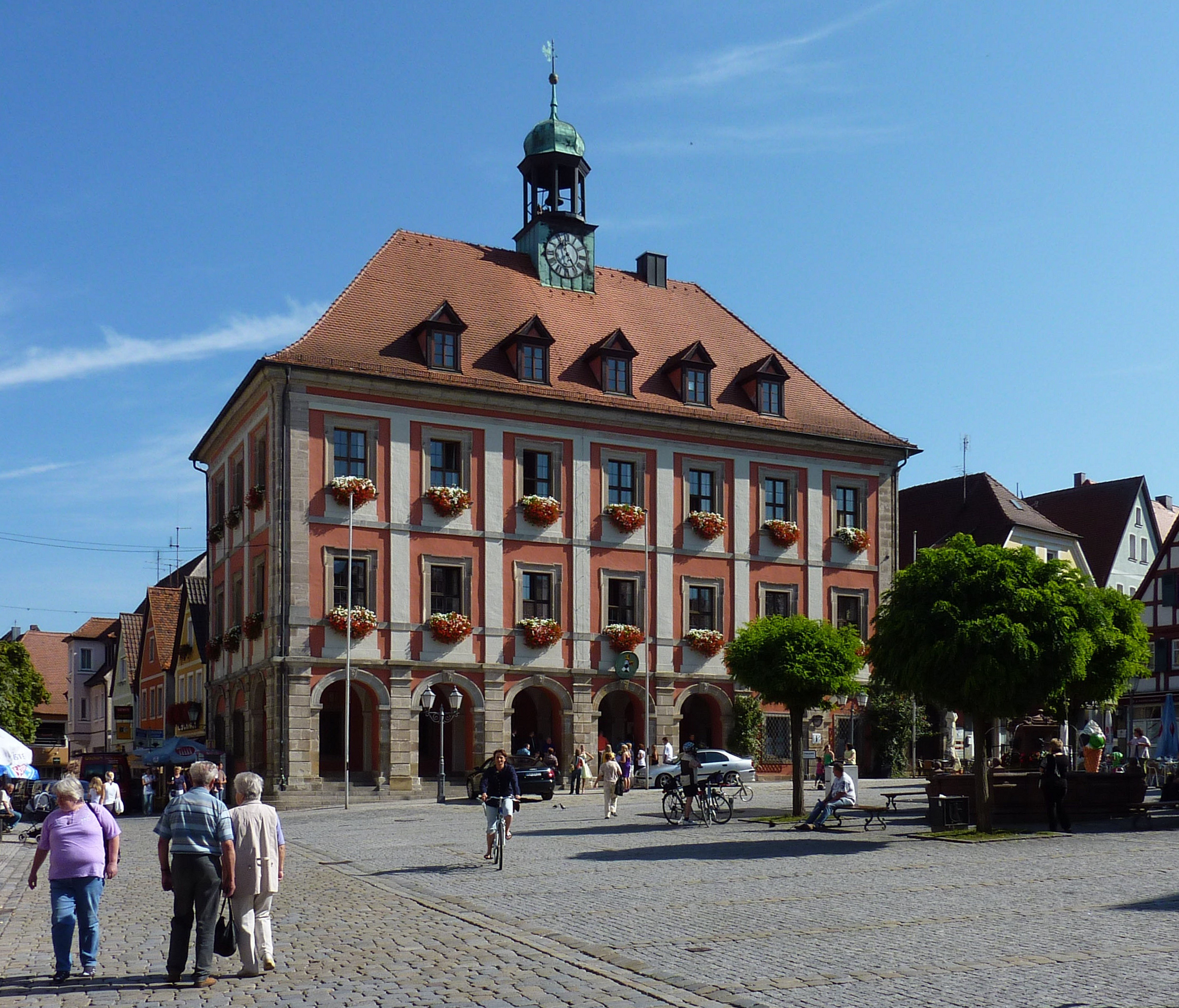
- Town hall

- Coat of arms

- Location of Neustadt an der Aisch within Neustadt a.d.Aisch-Bad Windsheim district
- Interactive map of Neustadt an der Aisch
- Location within Germany Location within Bavaria
- Coordinates: 49°35′48″N 10°36′32″E
- Country: Germany
- State: Bavaria
- Admin. region: Mittelfranken
- District: Neustadt a.d.Aisch-Bad Windsheim

Government
  - Mayor (2020–26): Klaus Meier (SPD)

Area
  - Total: 61.21 km^{2} (23.63 sq mi)

Population (2025-12-31)
  - Total: 13,293
  - Density: 217.2/km^{2} (562.5/sq mi)
- Time zone: UTC+01:00 (CET)
  - Summer (DST): UTC+02:00 (CEST)
- Postal codes: 91413
- Dialling codes: 09161
- Vehicle registration: NEA
- Website: www.neustadt-aisch.de/

Neustadt an der Aisch (German pronunciation: [ˈnɔʏʃtat ʔan deːɐ̯ ˈʔaɪʃ], lit. 'New City on the Aisch'; officially: Neustadt a.d. Aisch) is a small town of around 13,000 inhabitants in the northern part of Bavaria (Germany), within the Franconian administrative region Middle Franconia. It is the district town of the district Neustadt (Aisch)-Bad Windsheim.

== History ==
In 741, for the first time, Riedfeld, the town's root settlement, was documented as the German king's court. However, in 1285 the town's name is documented for the first time as "Nivenstadt".

At the end of the 12th century, Neustadt became part of the sovereign territory of the burgraves of Nuremberg, the dynasty of the Hohenzollern. The House of Hohenzollern developed Neustadt into an economical, political and also cultural centre of its region, mainly because of its favourable geographical position in the middle of the main trade route between Würzburg and Nuremberg.

At the end of the 15th century, Margrave Albrecht Achilles and Kurfürstin (Electress) Anna completed Neustadt as a stronghold.

In 1553, in the Second Margrave War, the town was burnt down. Afterwards, a long lasting phase of construction and extension began. This phase ended with the destructions of the Thirty Years' War. The rebuilding after that war lasted several hundreds of years.

From 1791 through to 1806, Neustadt was part of the sovereign territory of Prussia, then was military governed by the French, and in 1810 became finally part of the Kingdom of Bavaria. The political importance of Neustadt faded thereafter, but trade and industry kept growing due to the deployment of a garrison of the Uhlans, and in 1865 due to the opening of its station on the Nuremberg–Würzburg Railway.

In 1934, the town was the scene of an organized boycott against all Jewish merchants, and violence broke out against Christian Germans who patronized stores owned by Jews. Ultimately all of the Jews of Neustadt were expelled, many relocating to Nuremberg, and the Jewish synagogue was razed to the ground.

During the 20th century, traditional handicrafts (like brush-makers and makers of drawing instruments) almost completely vanished. With the resettlement of expellees from Sudetenland, new handicraft industries were imported: construction of musical instruments and the textile industry flourished.

From 1969 through to 1980, in total 16 Ortsteile were incorporated. In the course of an administrative reorganization (Gebietsreform), Neustadt became capital of the newly formed district "Neustadt (Aisch)-Bad Windsheim".

In the 1980s and 1990s, the infrastructure was improved on a grand scale: a beltway was built, and a pedestrian area around the market place was created; the cultural program was extended, and the old town was rehabilitated; new residential zones and business parks were established.

== Gallery ==
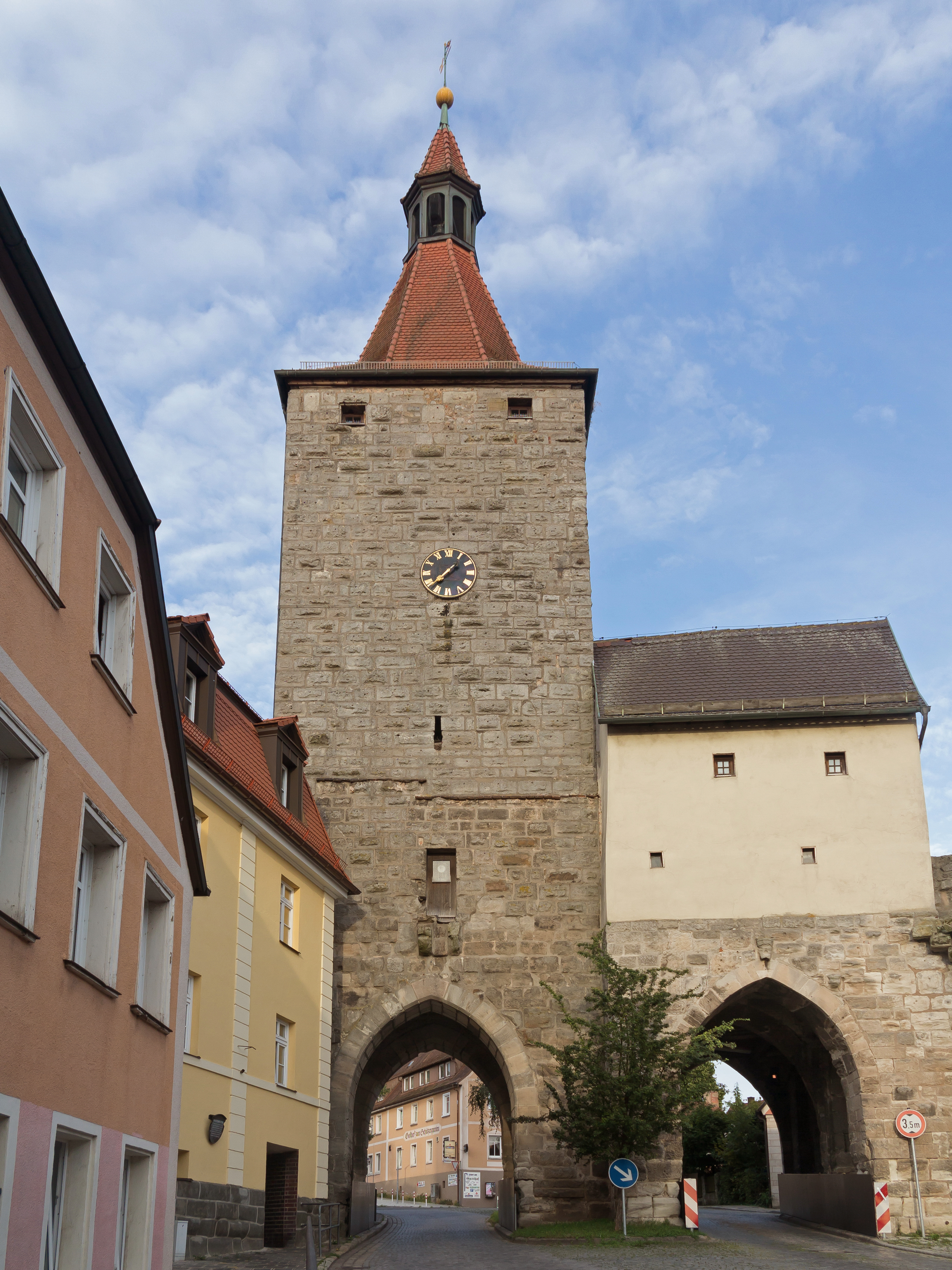
Town gate: das Nürnberger Tor

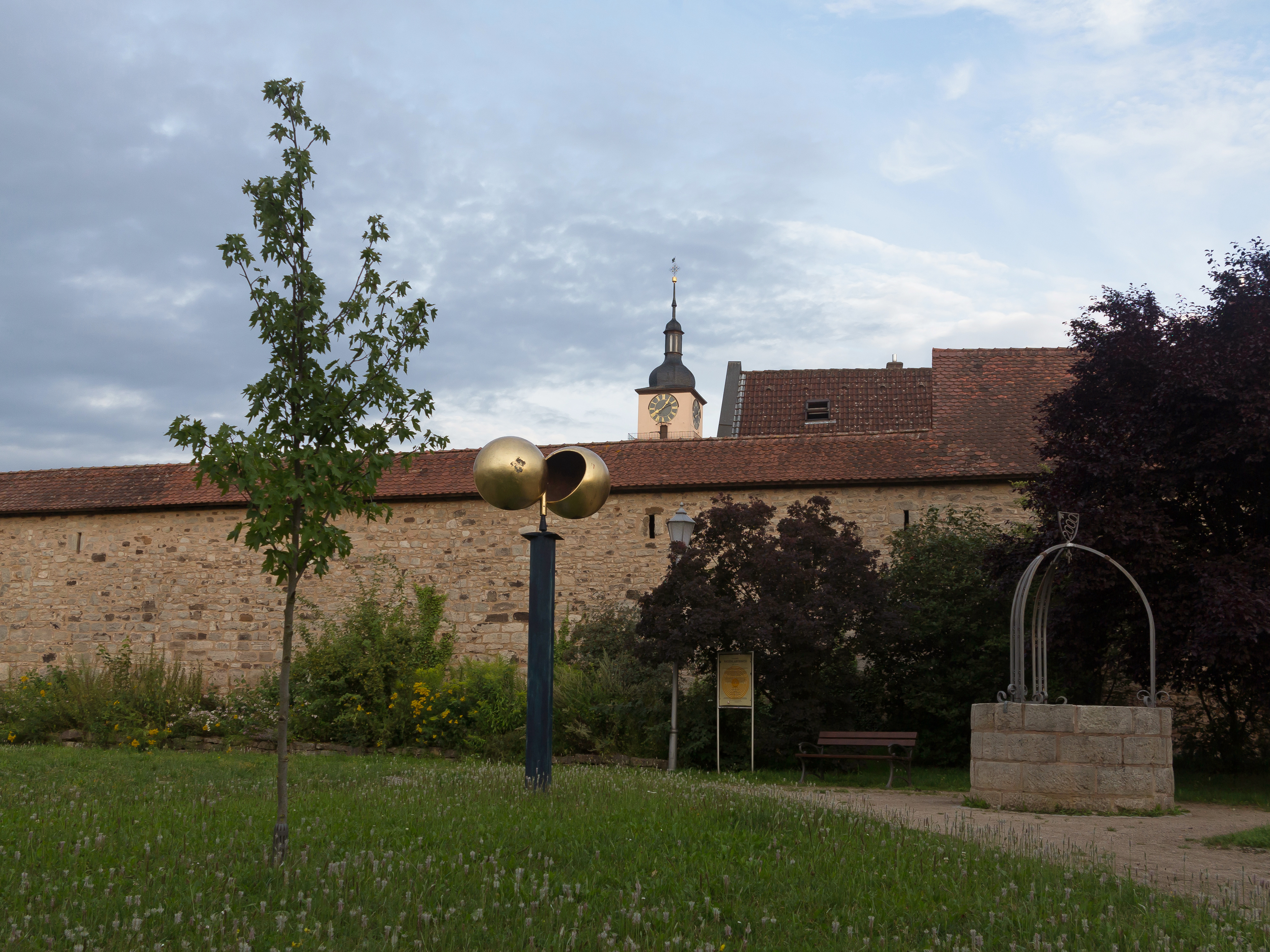
Street art near der NeustadtHalle

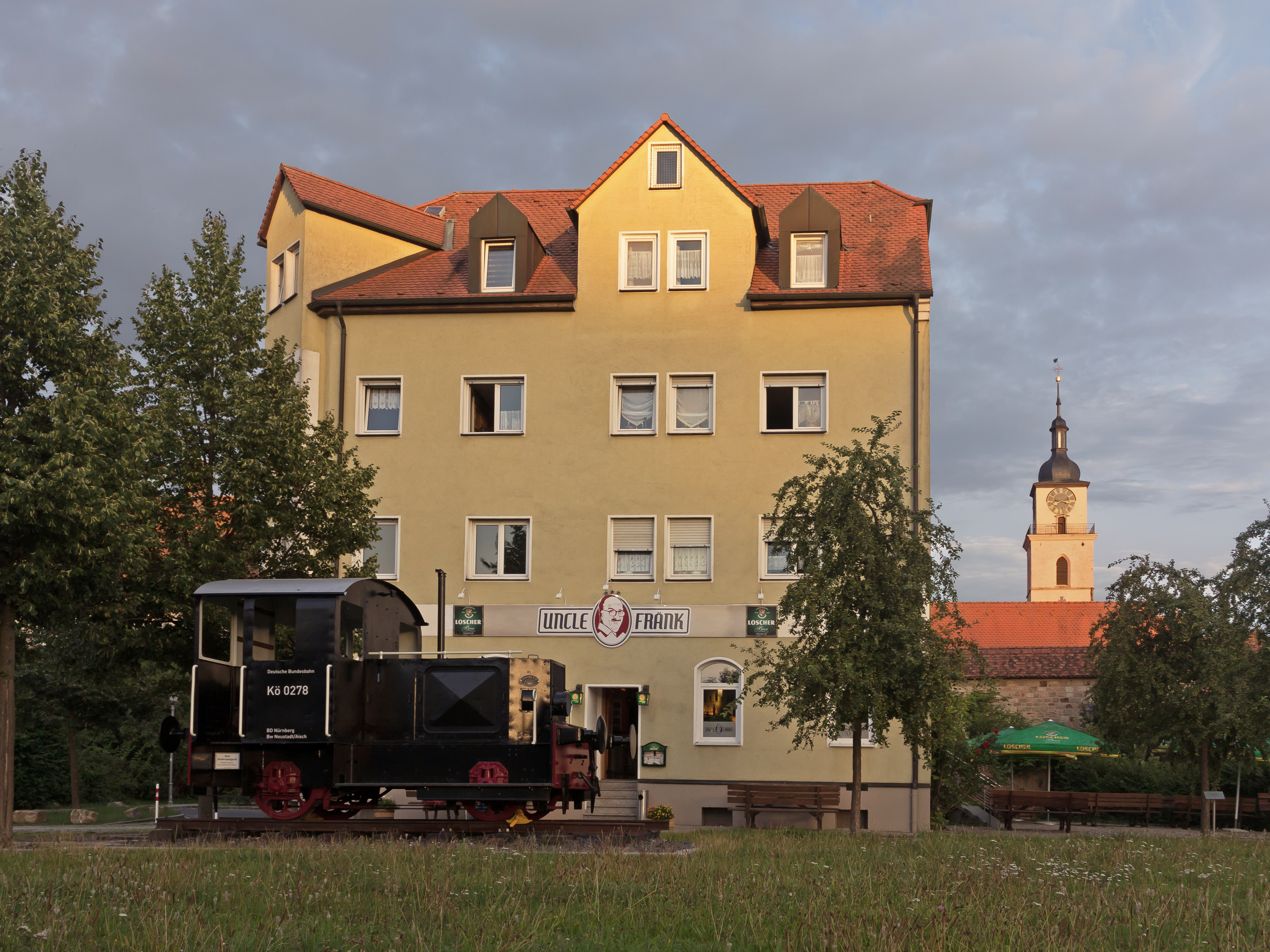
Bar Uncle Frank (now closed)

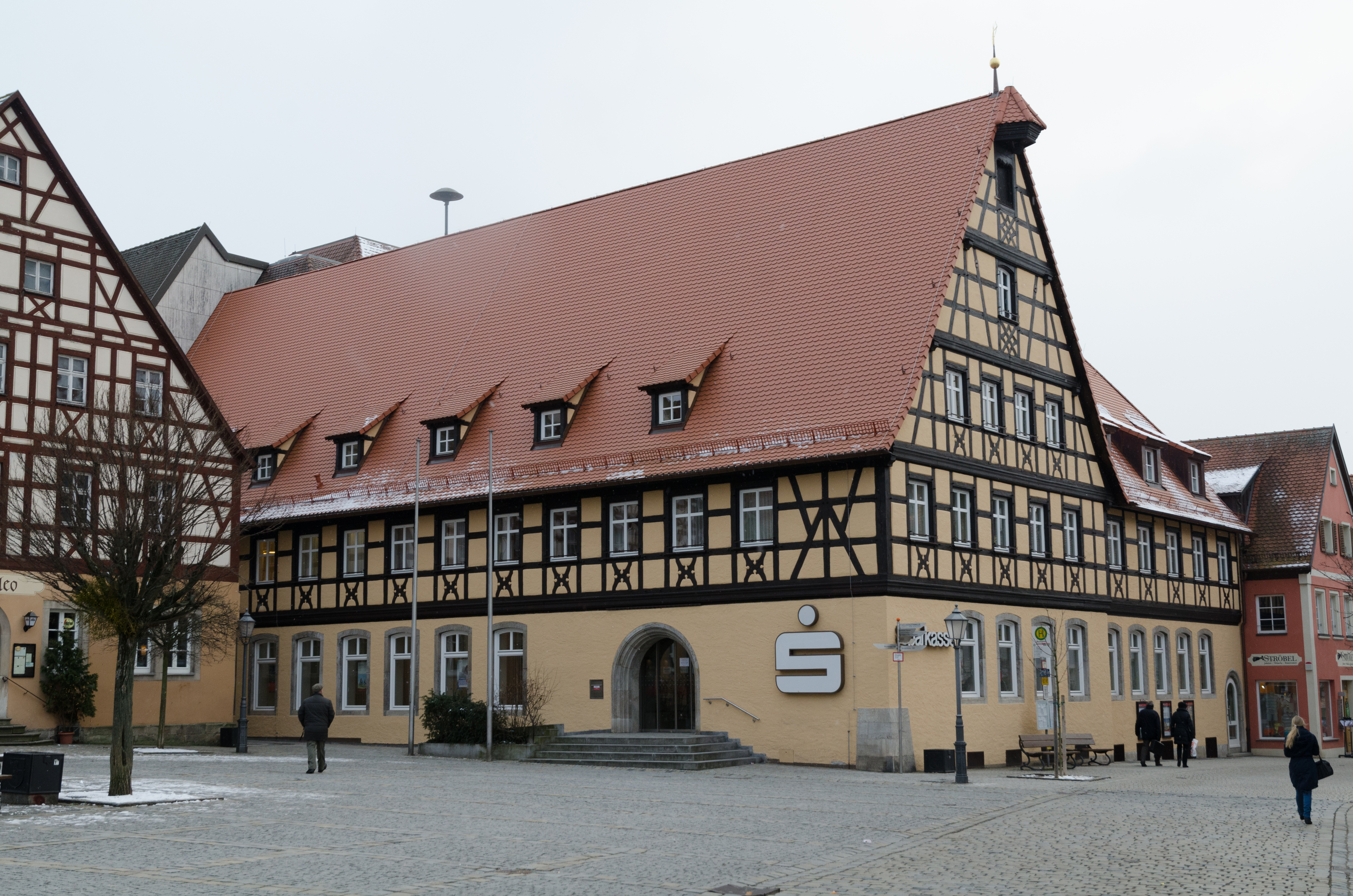
Sparkasse on market square

== Subdivisions ==
- Birkenfeld (including Weiherhof)
- Diebach
- Eggensee (including Chausseehaus)
- Herrnneuses (incl. Oberstrahlbach)
- Kleinerlbach
- Obernesselbach
- Unterschweinach
- Oberschweinach (incl. Stöckach)
- Schauerheim (incl. Hasenlohe and Virnsbergerhaag)
- Schellert
- Unternesselbach

== Notable people ==
=== Born in Neustadt ===
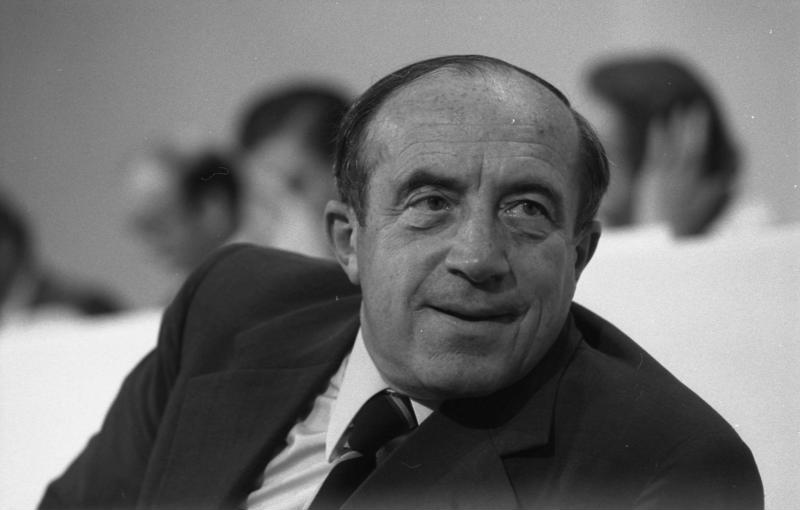
Werner Dollinger in 1978

- Elias Levita (1469 in Neustadt an der Aisch or Ipsheim; 1549 in Venice; in fact Eliyahu ben Asher Ha-Levi), translator, humanist, Hebrew grammarian, Yiddish writer.
- Johannes Gramann (also: Poliander, 1487–1541 in Königsberg), Protestant Reformer and poet of chants
- Lazarus Nürnberger (born 1499; died c. 1564 in Sevilla), merchant, in cooperation with Jacob and Hans Cromberger founder of the Deutscher Amerikahandel
- Johann Mützel (1647–1717), master builder of several castles in ernestinian principalities of Saxony-Anhalt and Thuringia (e.g. Schloss Ettersburg near Weimar), in the principalities Schwarzburg-Sondershausen and Arnstadt, in Schlitz, and in Tann (Rhön); builder of the residence of Goethe in Weimar, of the Friedenskirche (church) in Jena and the Kreuzkirche (church) in Eisenach
- Adolf Scherzer (1815–1864), composer of the Bayerischer Defiliermarsch
- Werner Dollinger (1918–2008), German politician (CSU), member of the Bundestag (1953–1990), treasury secretary (1962–1966), minister of postal services and telecommunication (1966–1969), minister of transport (1982–1987)
- Armin Schwarz (born 1963), German rally driver
- Julian Gressel (born 1993), football player
- Niklas Stark (born 1995), football player

=== Honorary citizens ===
- Paul von Hindenburg (1847–1934), Generalfeldmarschall and President of the German Reich, since 30 March 1933
- Max Döllner (1874-1959), Oberregierungsrat and Obermedizinalrat, documentarist of his country, since 26 March 1954
- Werner Dollinger (1918–2008), German politician (CSU), since 10 October 1978

=== People otherwise associated with Neustadt an der Aisch ===
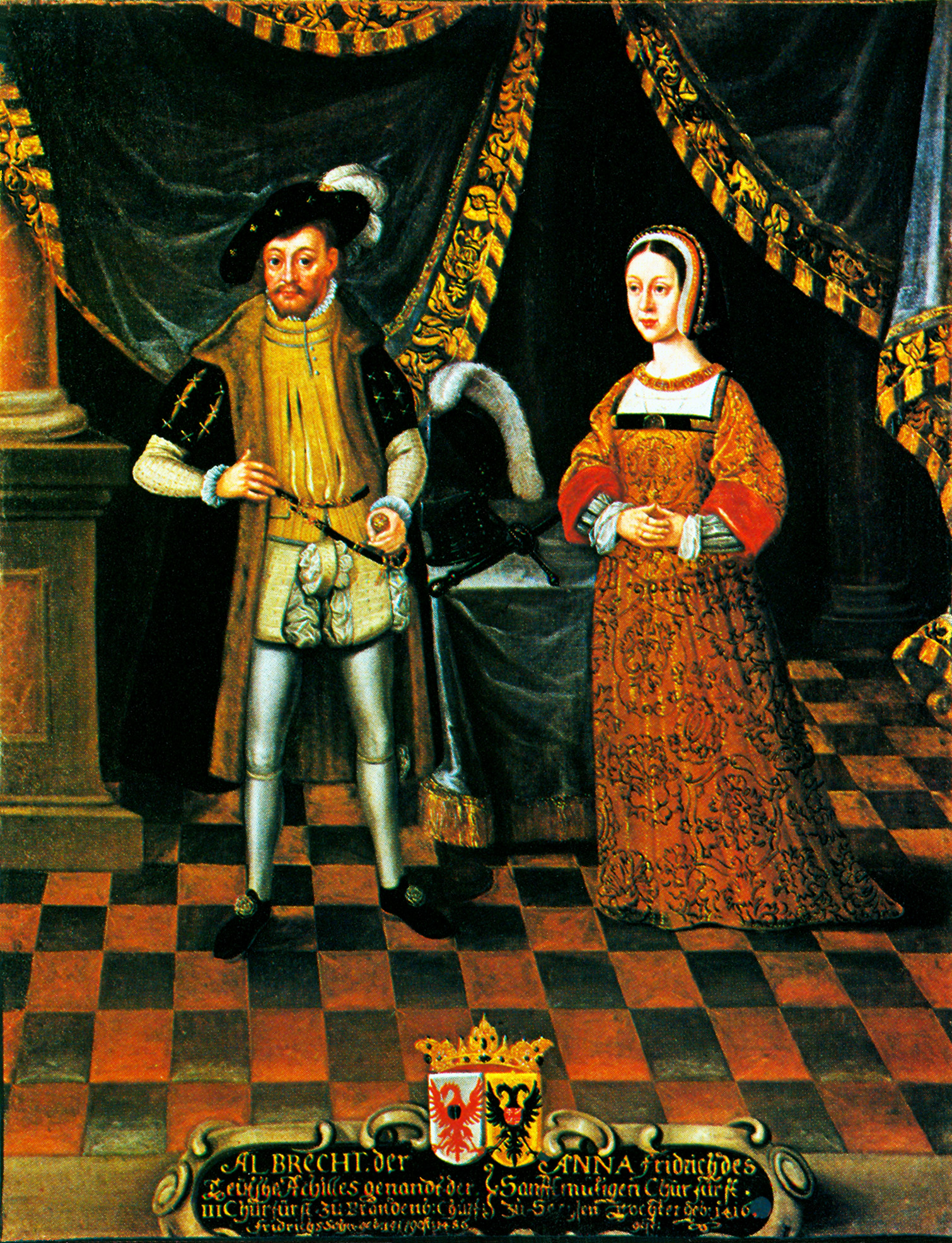
Albrecht Achilles and his second wife Anna

- Albrecht III Achilles, Elector of Brandenburg (born 1414 in Tangermünde; died 1486 in Frankfurt/Main), Prince-elector of the Margraviate of Brandenburg, he also ruled the Principality of Ansbach
- Kaspar Löner (born 1493 in Markt Erlbach; died 1546), Protestant Reformer in Hof
- Peter Kolb (born 1675 in Dörflas, today district of Marktredwitz; died 1726 in Neustadt an der Aisch), teacher and ethnologist
- Jean Paul (born 1763 in Wunsiedel; died 1825 in Bayreuth; in fact Johann Paul Friedrich Richter), author
- Hans W. Geißendörfer (born 1941 in Augsburg), film director, author and producer
- Guido Knopp (born 1948 in Treysa, today's town district of Schwalmstadt), historian, author and journalist
- Lissy Gröner (born 1954 in Langenfeld; died 2019), German politician (SPD), Member of the European Parliament 1989-2009
- Nevio Passaro (born 1981 in Bad Windsheim), German-Italian singer, songwriter and producer
- Augustus Schwaab (1823–1899), architect and civil engineer who emigrated to the United States

== Town twinning ==
- Montespertoli (Italy), since 1992
- Hino (Japan), since 1997
- Hluboká nad Vltavou (Frauenberg) (Czech Republic), since 1997
- Lipik (Croatia), since 1998
- Member of the working group Neustadt in Europa, in which 34 towns (as of August 2005) with the name "Neustadt" located in Germany, Austria, Hungary, the Czech Republic and Slovakia confederate.
