= Hauptplatz =

Hauptplatz (German: "Main Square") is the name of a number of squares in German speaking cities:

- Hauptplatz, the main square in the city of Graz, Austria
- Hauptplatz, a square in the city of Ried im Innkreis, Austria
- Hauptplatz (Salzburg), a square, now known as Residenzplatz, in the city of Salzburg, Austria
- Hauptplatz, a square in the city of Wiener Neustadt, Austria

== See also ==
- Main Square (disambiguation)
