= Oberscheinfeld =

- Municipality
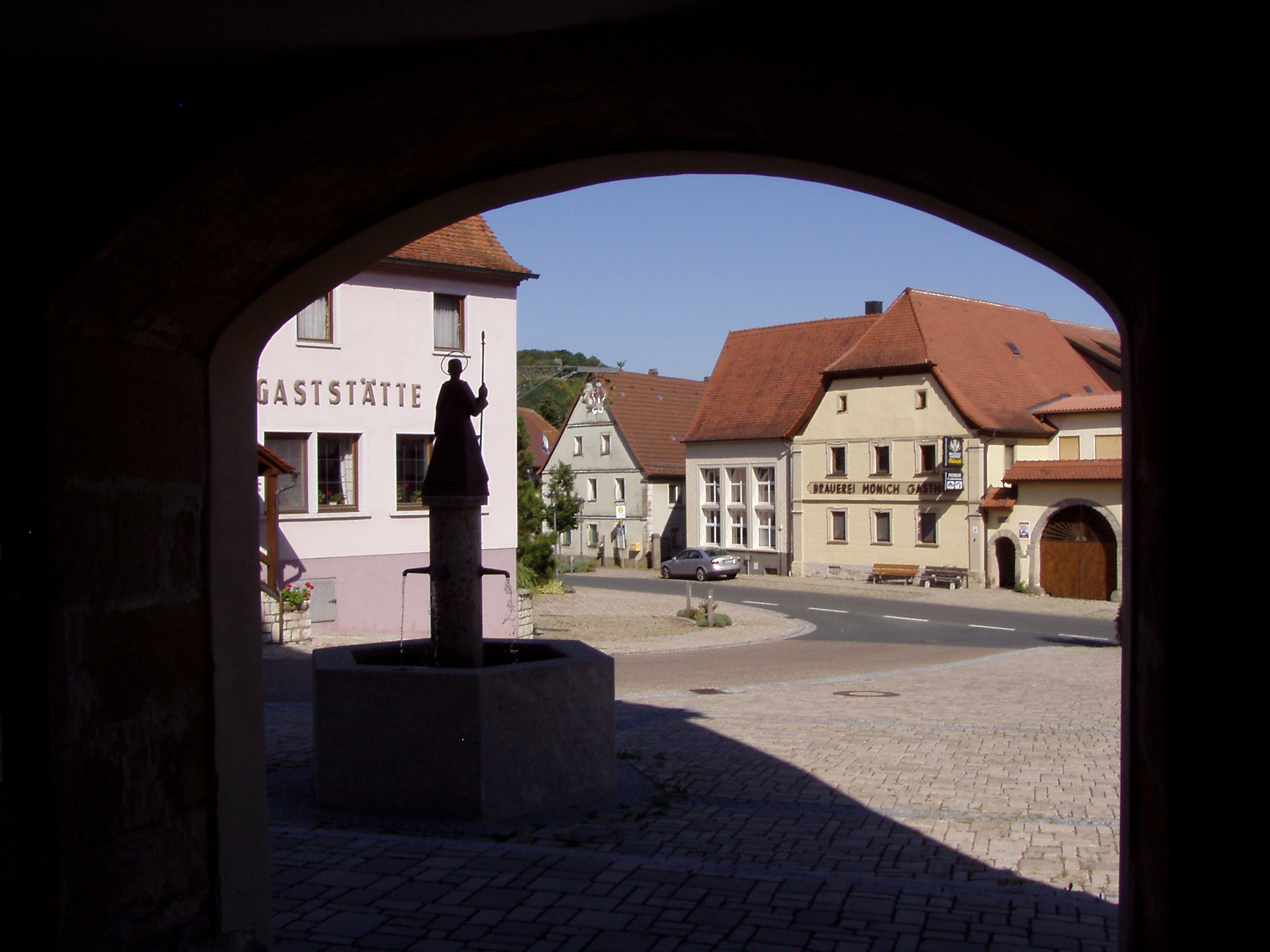
- Market square

- Coat of arms

- Location of Oberscheinfeld within Neustadt a.d.Aisch-Bad Windsheim district
- Interactive map of Oberscheinfeld
- Location within Germany Location within Bavaria
- Coordinates: 49°43′N 10°25′E
- Country: Germany
- State: Bavaria
- Admin. region: Mittelfranken
- District: Neustadt a.d.Aisch-Bad Windsheim
- Municipal assoc.: Scheinfeld
- Subdivisions: 19 Ortsteile

Government
  - Mayor (2020–26): Peter Sendner (CSU)

Area
  - Total: 42.27 km^{2} (16.32 sq mi)
- Elevation: 331 m (1,086 ft)

Population (2025-12-31)
  - Total: 1,060
  - Density: 25.1/km^{2} (64.9/sq mi)
- Time zone: UTC+01:00 (CET)
  - Summer (DST): UTC+02:00 (CEST)
- Postal codes: 91483
- Dialling codes: 09167
- Vehicle registration: NEA
- Website: www.oberscheinfeld.de

Oberscheinfeld is a municipalityin the district of Neustadt (Aisch)-Bad Windsheim in Bavaria in Germany.
