= Sugenheim =

- Municipality
- Coat of arms

- Location of Sugenheim within Neustadt a.d.Aisch-Bad Windsheim district
- Interactive map of Sugenheim
- Location within Germany Location within Bavaria
- Coordinates: 49°36′N 10°25′E
- Country: Germany
- State: Bavaria
- Admin. region: Mittelfranken
- District: Neustadt a.d.Aisch-Bad Windsheim
- Municipal assoc.: Scheinfeld

Government
  - Mayor (2024–30): Anton Schiefer (SPD)

Area
  - Total: 63.41 km^{2} (24.48 sq mi)
- Elevation: 312 m (1,024 ft)

Population (2025-12-31)
  - Total: 2,296
  - Density: 36.21/km^{2} (93.78/sq mi)
- Time zone: UTC+01:00 (CET)
  - Summer (DST): UTC+02:00 (CEST)
- Postal codes: 91484, 91438 (Dutzenthal)
- Dialling codes: 09165, 09164 (Ullstadt)
- Vehicle registration: NEA, SEF, UFF
- Website: www.sugenheim.de

Sugenheim is a municipality in the district of Neustadt (Aisch)-Bad Windsheim in Bavaria, Germany. The municipality consists of eleven villages:

- Krautostheim
- Krassolzheim
- Deutenheim
- Ezelheim
- Ullstadt
- Sugenheim
- Ingolstadt
- Neundorf
- Rüdern
- Hürfeld
- Dutzenthal

== Gallery ==
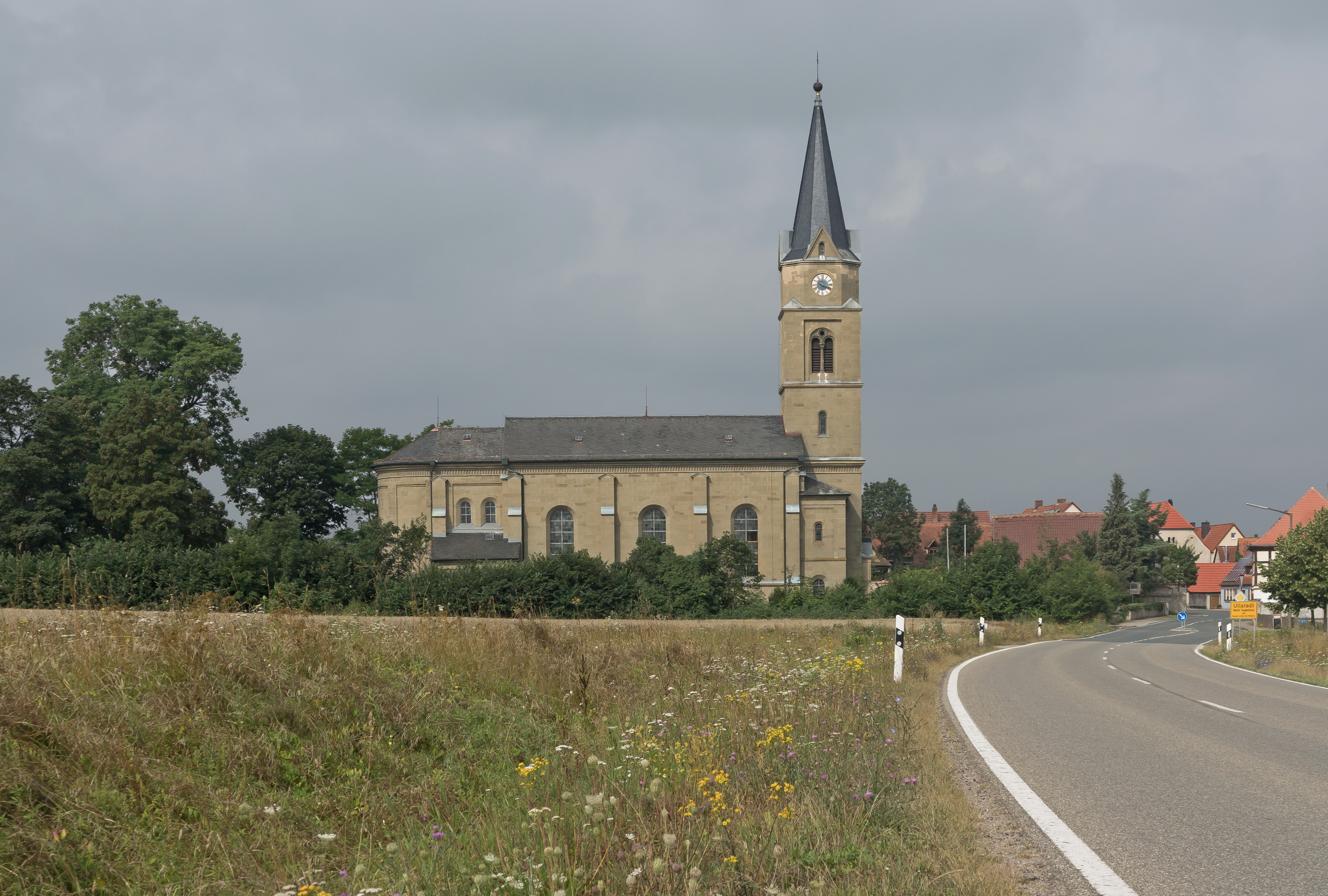
Ullstadt, catholic church: Pfarrkirche Mariä Himmelfahrt

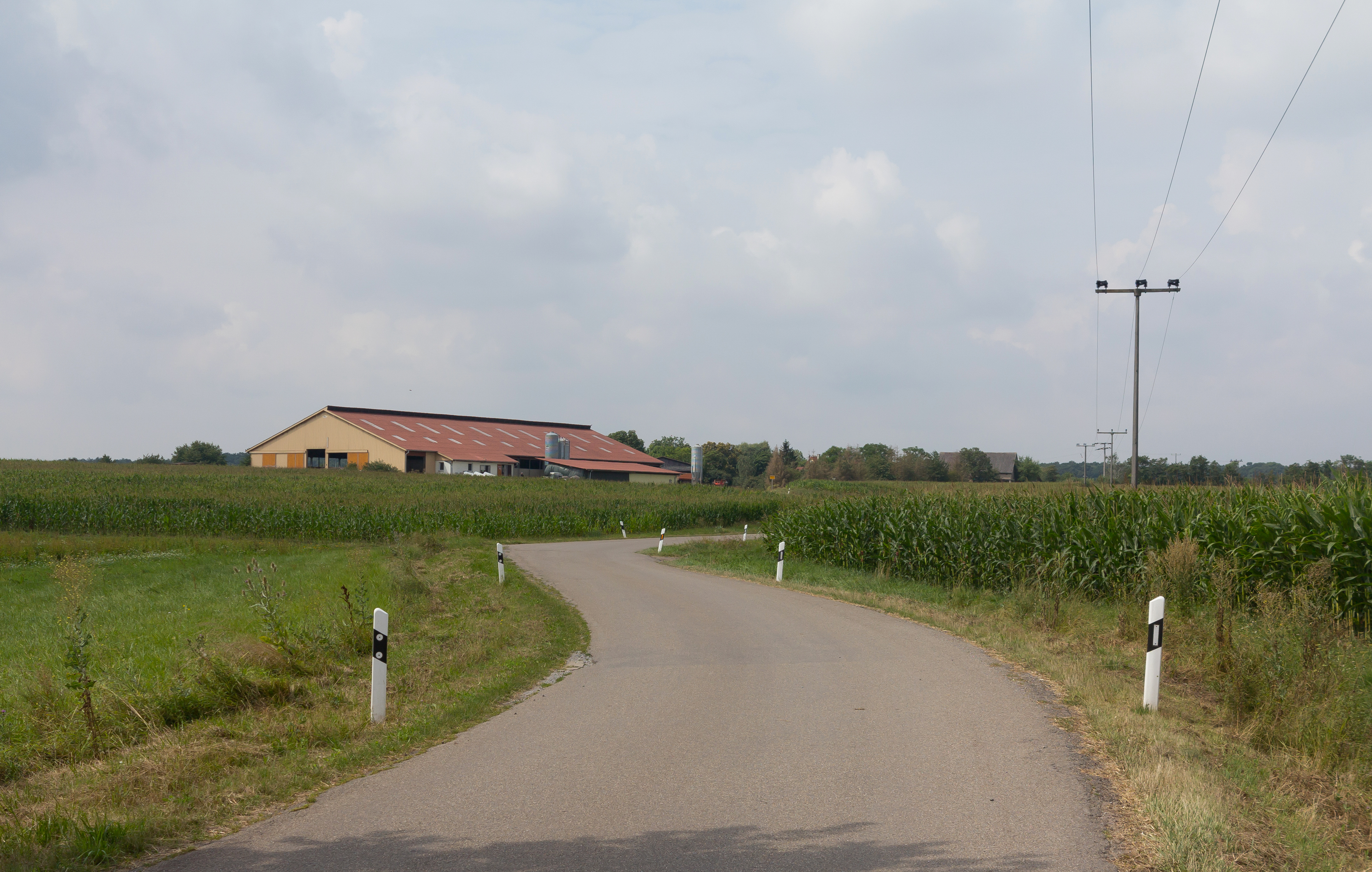
Rüdern, agricultural company at the edge of the village

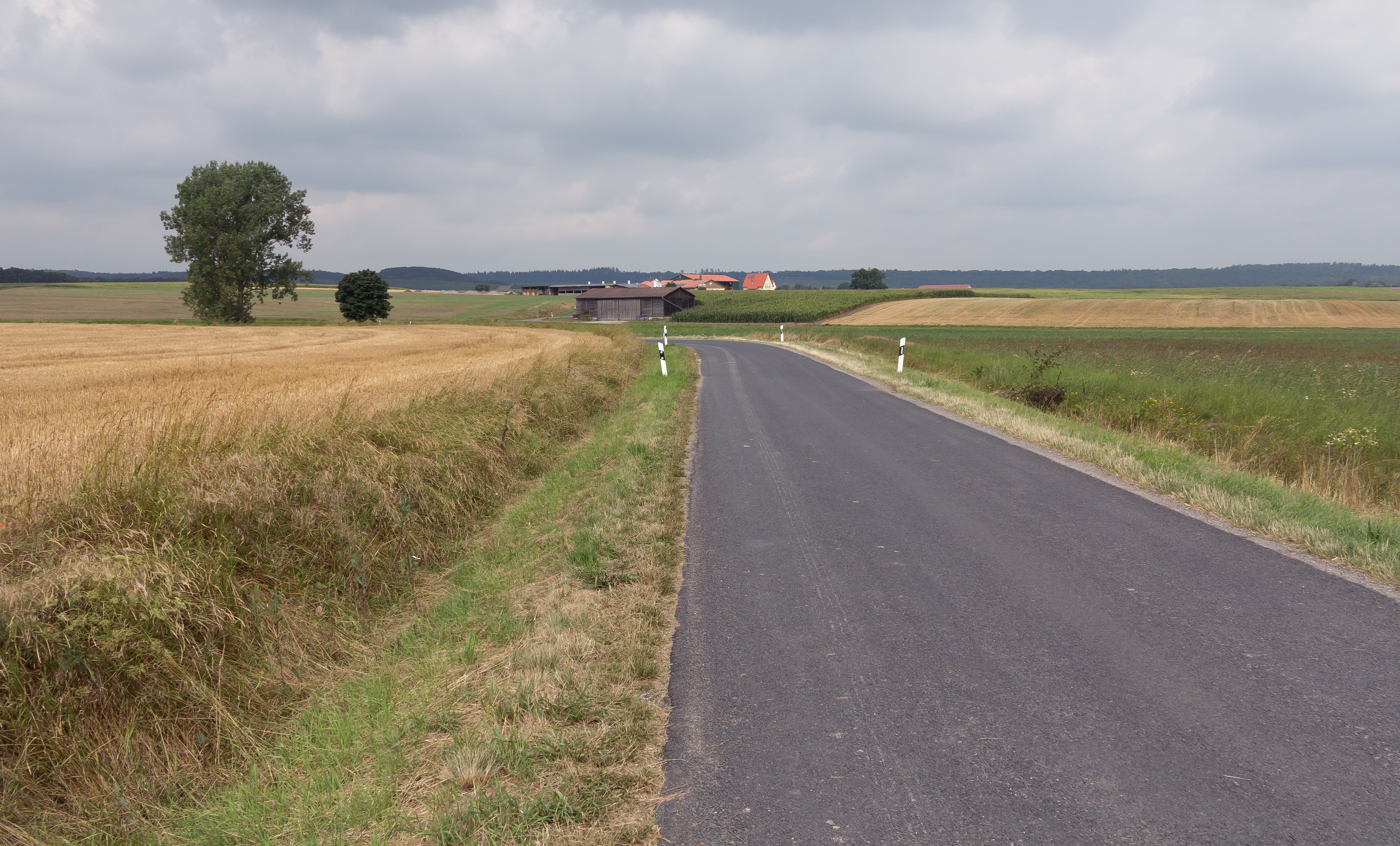
near Sugenheim, panorama

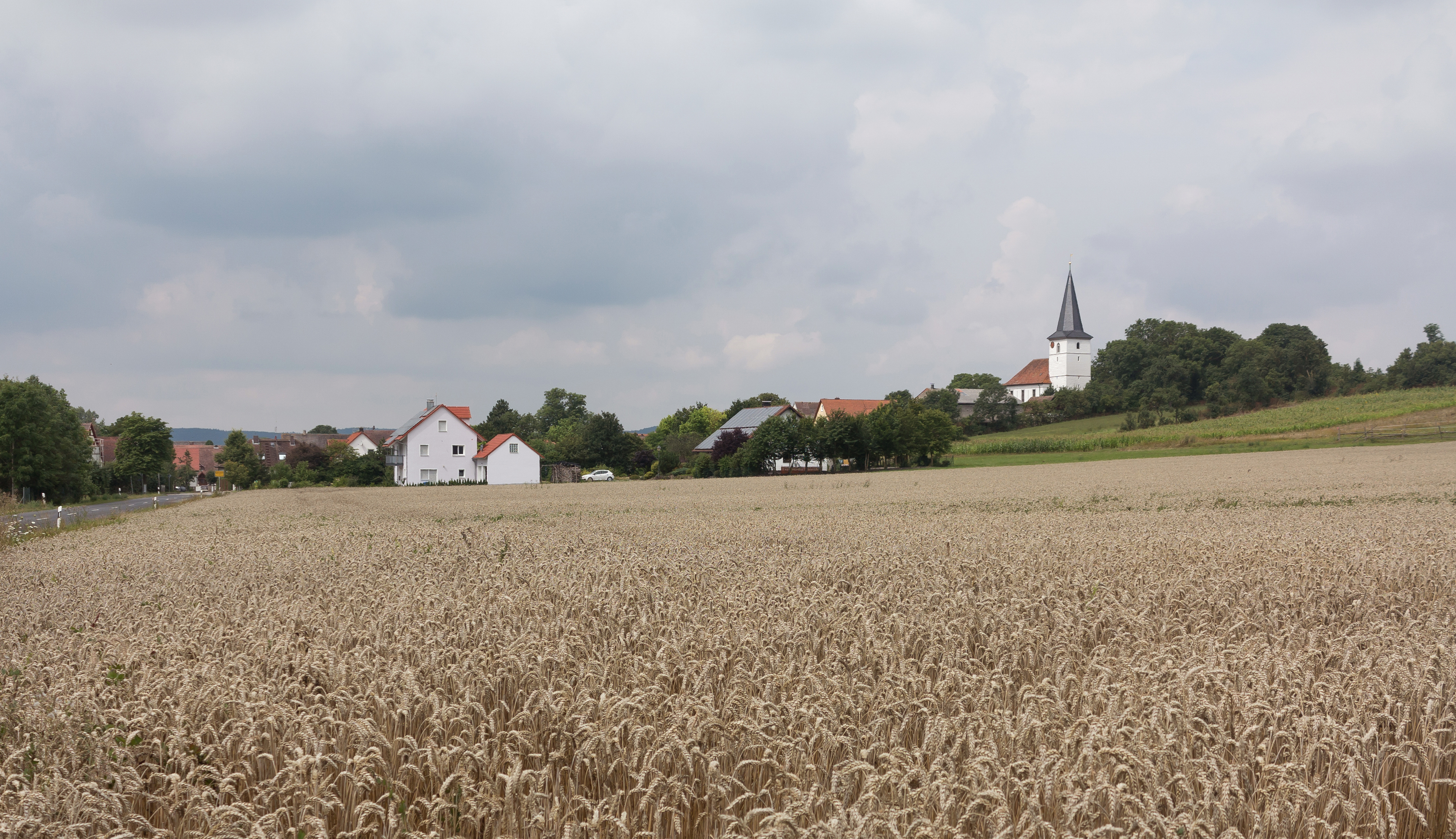
Ezelheim, view to the village

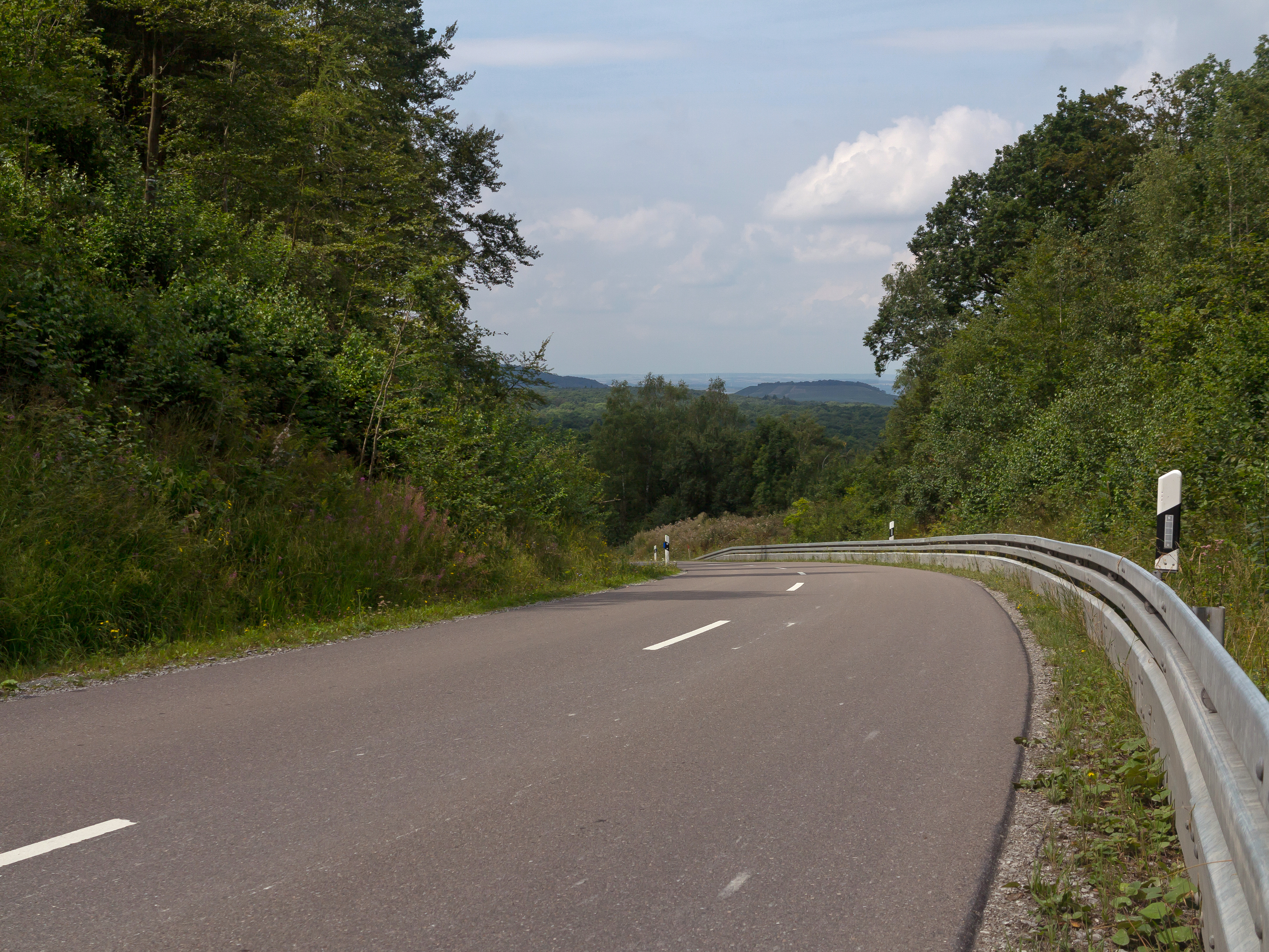
between Krassolzheim and Ezelheim, panorama
