= Lissy Gröner =

German politician (1954–2019)

Lissy Gröner MEP
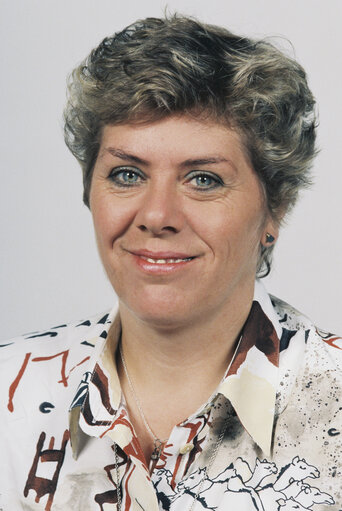

Member of the European Parliament for Germany
- In office 1989–2009

Personal details
- Born: 31 May 1954 Langenfeld, West Germany
- Died: 9 September 2019 (aged 65)
- Party: Social Democratic Party of Germany
- Spouse: Sabine Gillessen (2005–2019)

Liselotte Carola Gröner (31 May 1954 – 9 September 2019) was a German politician and, from 1989 to 2009, was a Member of the European Parliament with the Social Democratic Party of Germany, part of the Socialist Group. She sat on the European Parliament's Committee on Culture and Education and its Committee on Women's Rights and Gender Equality.

She was a substitute for the Committee on Budgets, substitute for the Delegation for relations with the countries of South Asia and the South Asian Association for Regional Cooperation (SAARC).

== Activities ==
- Vice-President of SIW (Socialist International Women)
- PSE coordinator on the Committee on Women's Rights and Equal opportunities
- Vice-Chair of the Children's Alliance
- Member of the board of the Association of Social-Democratic Women

== Member of ==
- The Workers' Welfare Association (AWO)
- Bund für Umwelt und Naturschutz Deutschland (BUND, Association for Nature and Environmental Protection)
- Europa-Union Deutschland
- Women's International League for Peace and Freedom IFFF

== Main areas of work ==
- Spokeswoman for SPD Members of the European Parliament on youth policy

== Rapporteur for ==
- The 1995 World Conference on Women in Beijing and Beijing +5
- Problems of children in the European Community
- Poverty among women in Europe
- Equal opportunities programme (interim report)
- 2000-2006: The Youth Action Programme
- White Paper on youth

== Personal life ==
Gröner was a lesbian and was married to Sabine Gillessen. The couple married in Belgium in September 2005, with Gröner announcing, "There is no discrimination of same-sex couples in Belgium by law. And this is the signal we want to give to the people in Europe, to send the message out: it's possible to honor the love of same-sex people by law".

== See also ==
- 2004 European Parliament election in Germany
