= Mercato =

Mercato may refer to:

- Mercato (Naples), a quarter of Naples, Italy
- Mercato, the municipal seat of Giffoni Valle Piana

== See also ==
- Mercato San Severino, a municipality of the Province of Salerno, Campania
- Mercato Saraceno, a municipality of the Province of Forlì-Cesena, Emilia-Romagna
- Mercato Centrale (Florence), the central market of Florence, Italy
- Addis Mercato, the largest open-air marketplace in Africa
- Mercato Shopping Mall, shopping centre in Dubai, UAE
