= The Market (company) =

- Type: Subsidiary of SuperValu
- Industry: Retail
- Founded: 2003 (23 years ago) in Richmond, Virginia
- Headquarters: Virginia Beach, Virginia
- Key people: Jeff Noddle, Chairman and CEO, SuperValu, Inc. Ron Dennis, President & CEO, Farm Fresh Food and Pharmacy
- Products: Bakery, dairy, deli, frozen foods, grocery, meat, produce, seafood, snacks, beer, wine, gourmet/specialty
- Parent: SuperValu, Inc.
- Website: farmfreshsupermarkets.com

The Market: A Farm Fresh Supermarket was a high end concept grocery store catering specifically to urban customers. It was owned and operated by Virginia Beach, Virginia-based Farm Fresh Food & Pharmacy. The Market had three locations, two of which were in Norfolk, Virginia, and the original location in Richmond, Virginia. The first store was an independently owned and operated grocery store which closed due to financial problems. The store's distributor, SuperValu, required that the store be reopened and handed operations over to FF Acquisitions LLC.

The Market was known for each location being named after its neighborhood: Richmond's "The Market at Tobacco Row," Norfolk's "The Market at Ghent," and "The Market at Harbour Heights." Each store specialized in something prominent in the neighborhoods that they served, for example "The Market at Ghent" is located in a neighborhood with a large Jewish population; therefore it contains a large kosher foods section. All of The Market locations contained a premier bakery, deli, seafood shop, butcher, and wine specialist along with gourmet chefs on staff to prepare meals to carry home at the store's signature Chef's Corner.

The chain's flagship store at Harbour Heights in downtown Norfolk closed the first half of 2011 after being open for only four years. The original location at Tobacco Row was rebranded as a Farm Fresh Supermarket during the third quarter on 2011 and the Ghent location was rebranded as a Farm Fresh Supermarket in November 2011.

Farm Fresh Food and Pharmacy and The Market are wholly owned subsidiaries of Eden Prairie, Minnesota-based SuperValu, Inc.

== See also ==
- Farm Fresh Food & Pharmacy
- SuperValu, Inc
