= Markt station =

Markt station may refer to:

- Ahrweiler Markt station, a railway station along Ahr Valley Railway in Ahrweiler, Germany
- Eygelshoven Markt railway station, a railway station along Sittard–Herzogenrath railway in Eygelshoven, Netherlands
- Leipzig Markt station, an underground railway station at Leipzig City Tunnel in Leipzig, Germany
- Niendorf Markt station, an underground station of Hamburg U-Bahn rapid transit system in Niendorf, Hamburg, Germany
- Wandsbek Markt (Hamburg U-Bahn station), an underground station of Hamburg U-Bahn rapid transit system in Wandsbek, Hamburg, Germany
- Alter Markt station, a stop along Wuppertal Suspension Railway in Wuppertal, Germany
- Berlin Hackescher Markt station, a railway station along Berlin Stadtbahn in Berlin, Germany
- Universität-Markt (SWB), an underground stop on the Bonn Stadtbahn in Bonn, Germany.
