= Grote Markt =

Grote Markt (Dutch for "Grand Market"; French: Grand-Place) is a common name of a centrally located historic market square in many cities in Belgium and the Netherlands.

- Grote Markt (Antwerp)
- Grote Markt (Brussels), also known as the Grand-Place
- Grote Markt (Haarlem)
- Grote Markt (Kortrijk)
- Grote Markt (Leuven)
- Grote Markt RandstadRail station

== See also ==
- market square
- Markt (Bruges)
