= Markt Taschendorf =

- Municipality
- Coat of arms

- Location of Markt Taschendorf within Neustadt a.d.Aisch-Bad Windsheim district
- Interactive map of Markt Taschendorf
- Location within Germany Location within Bavaria
- Coordinates: 49°42′N 10°33′E
- Country: Germany
- State: Bavaria
- Admin. region: Mittelfranken
- District: Neustadt a.d.Aisch-Bad Windsheim
- Municipal assoc.: Scheinfeld

Government
  - Mayor (2020–26): Otmar Lorey

Area
  - Total: 27.73 km^{2} (10.71 sq mi)
- Elevation: 343 m (1,125 ft)

Population (2025-12-31)
  - Total: 1,034
  - Density: 37.29/km^{2} (96.58/sq mi)
- Time zone: UTC+01:00 (CET)
  - Summer (DST): UTC+02:00 (CEST)
- Postal codes: 91480
- Dialling codes: 09552
- Vehicle registration: NEA
- Website: www.markt-markt-taschendorf.de

Markt Taschendorf is a municipality in the district of Neustadt (Aisch)-Bad Windsheim in Bavaria in Germany.

== Mayor ==
Otmar Lorey is the mayor since May 2020.
