= Markt Bibart =

- Municipality
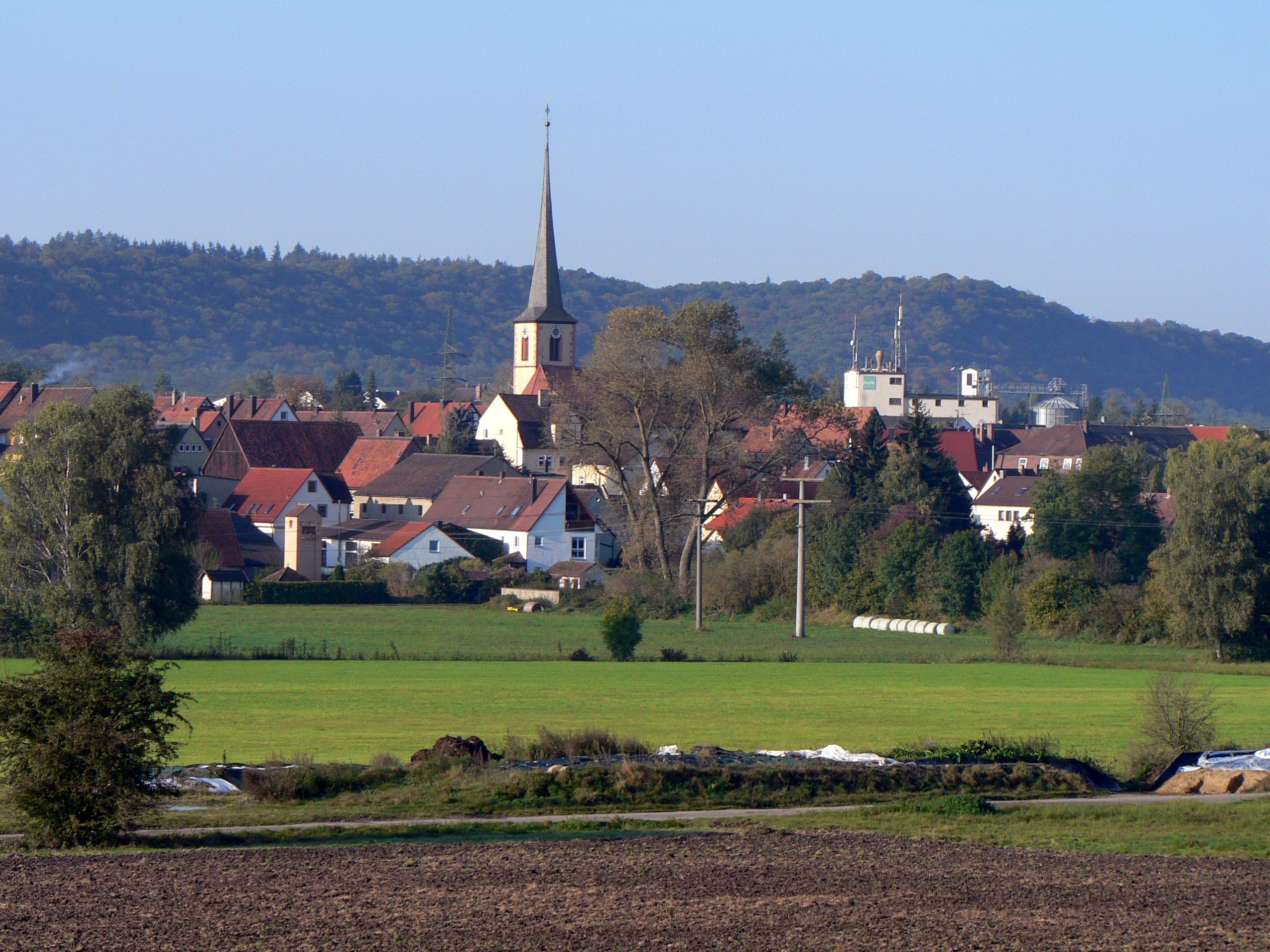
- Markt Bibart

- Coat of arms

- Location of Markt Bibart within Neustadt a.d.Aisch-Bad Windsheim district
- Interactive map of Markt Bibart
- Location within Germany Location within Bavaria
- Coordinates: 49°38′N 10°25′E
- Country: Germany
- State: Bavaria
- Admin. region: Mittelfranken
- District: Neustadt a.d.Aisch-Bad Windsheim
- Municipal assoc.: Scheinfeld
- Subdivisions: 6 Ortsteile

Government
  - Mayor (2020–26): Klaus Nölp (CSU)

Area
  - Total: 30.07 km^{2} (11.61 sq mi)
- Elevation: 309 m (1,014 ft)

Population (2025-12-31)
  - Total: 1,793
  - Density: 59.63/km^{2} (154.4/sq mi)
- Time zone: UTC+01:00 (CET)
  - Summer (DST): UTC+02:00 (CEST)
- Postal codes: 91477
- Dialling codes: 09162
- Vehicle registration: NEA
- Website: www.markt-bibart.de

Markt Bibart is a market town and municipality in the district of Neustadt (Aisch)-Bad Windsheim in Bavaria in Germany.

== Mayor ==
Klaus Nölp was elected in March 2014 the new mayor. He is the successor of Günther Ludwig.
