= Public market (disambiguation) =

A public market is a type of marketplace.

Public market may also refer to:

== Types of marketplaces ==
- Financial market, especially those accessible to the general population
- Wet market, especially those that are community or government-owned

== Places ==
- Boston Public Market – Boston, Massachusetts
- James Beard Public Market – Portland, Oregon
- Milwaukee Public Market – Milwaukee, Wisconsin
- Pike Place Public Market – in Seattle, Washington
- Portland Public Market – Portland, Oregon
