= The Market Place (restaurant) =

Restaurant in Asheville, North Carolina, U.S.

- Interactive map of The Market Place

Restaurant information
- Owner: William Dissen
- Head chef: William Dissen
- Location: 20 Wall Street, Asheville, Buncombe, North Carolina, 28801, United States
- Coordinates: 35°35′41″N 82°33′19″W
- Reservations: Yes

The Market Place is a restaurant in Asheville, North Carolina, United States. It was a semifinalist in the Outstanding Restaurant category of the James Beard Foundation Awards in 2024. It is owned by chef William Dissen.
