= Langenfeld, Bavaria =

Langenfeld
- Municipality
- Coat of arms

- Location of Langenfeld within Neustadt a.d.Aisch-Bad Windsheim district
- Interactive map of Langenfeld
- Location within Germany Location within Bavaria
- Coordinates: 49°37′N 10°31′E
- Country: Germany
- State: Bavaria
- Admin. region: Mittelfranken
- District: Neustadt a.d.Aisch-Bad Windsheim
- Municipal assoc.: Scheinfeld
- Subdivisions: 3 Ortsteile

Government
  - Mayor (2020–26): Reinhard Streng

Area
  - Total: 7.2 km^{2} (2.8 sq mi)
- Elevation: 303 m (994 ft)

Population (2025-12-31)
  - Total: 1,068
  - Density: 150/km^{2} (380/sq mi)
- Time zone: UTC+01:00 (CET)
  - Summer (DST): UTC+02:00 (CEST)
- Postal codes: 91474
- Dialling codes: 09164
- Vehicle registration: NEA

Langenfeld (German pronunciation: [ˈlaŋənfɛlt]) is a municipality in the district of Neustadt (Aisch)-Bad Windsheim in Bavaria in Germany.
