= Market Place Shopping Center =

Mall in Champaign, Illinois, US

- The mall's center court, September 2026
- Location: Champaign, Illinois, United States
- Coordinates: 40.14244°N 88.24307°W
- Address: 2000 North Neil Street
- Opened: 1975; 51 years ago
- Developer: Landau and Heyman
- Manager: GGP
- Owner: GGP
- Num. of stores: 109
- Num. of anchor tenants: 5
- Floor area: 887,071 sq ft (82,412 m^{2})
- Floors: 1 (2 in Macy's)
- Public transit: Champaign–Urbana Mass Transit District
- Website: marketplacemall.com

Market Place Shopping Center is a shopping mall located in Champaign, Illinois, US. The mall's anchor stores are Dick's Sporting Goods, JCPenney, Macy's, and Costco Wholesale. It is the second largest enclosed shopping mall in Central Illinois.

== History ==
Construction on Market Place Shopping Center began in October 1973 on land north of the Neil Street exit along Interstate 74, after developers Landau and Heyman had quietly assembled property at the site and released a market study in October 1969 confirming plans for a regional mall near downtown Champaign. The project drew opposition from a citizens' group, Preserve our Land and Neighborhoods (PLAN), which objected to the loss of agricultural land and the potential impact of suburban retail on the city's traditional business districts.

In February 1973, Sears confirmed that it would relocate from downtown Champaign to the planned mall. A new 100,000 square foot Sears store opened at the site in October 1975, several months before the rest of the complex, and served as one of the mall's original anchors along with Bergner's.

Macy's at Market Place Shopping Center, September 2026

Market Place held its formal grand opening on March 17, 1976 with a ribbon cutting in the central court and additional ceremonies at Bergner's and Osco Drug.

On April 3, 1978, JC Penney announced that it would leave its downtown Champaign location at 15 Main Street to join Sears at Market Place, prompting construction of a third (north) wing that opened in October 1979 at an estimated cost of 7 million dollars. The expansion helped spur additional commercial development along North Neil Street, including a La Quinta Motor Hotel and several restaurants and strip centers; by the 1990s the corridor between the mall and Interstate 74 had become a major focus of big-box retail in Champaign.

In 1998, then-owner General Growth Properties announced a major renovation and expansion intended to update the mall and respond to competition from new big box centers along nearby Prospect Avenue. The project remodeled the interior corridors with a Tuscany themed Italian village design and added a new food court and glass enclosed pavilion with an indoor carousel. An additional 100,000 square foot wing for a St. Louis based Famous-Barr department store was completed in 1999, bringing the mall's gross leasable area to about 1,000,000 square feet. JCPenney, which had left the property and the region five years earlier, re-entered the mall as an anchor in May 2004, and Famous-Barr was rebranded as Macy's in 2006 following the acquisition of its parent company May Department Stores by Federated Department Stores.

In 2013, Sears announced that it would close its Market Place store in early 2014, ending a continuous Sears presence in Champaign that dated to 1928 and to the mall's opening. The original Sears building was subsequently demolished, and General Growth Properties announced in 2015 that it would replace the space with a Dick's Sporting Goods and a Field & Stream store; both anchors opened in October 2015.

Beginning in the late 2010s, Market Place experienced the same pattern of store closures seen at many regional malls in the United States, as national chains including Loft, Gymboree, Payless ShoeSource and Charlotte Russe closed their Champaign locations amid companywide bankruptcies and restructurings. At the same time, new tenants such as H&M and other specialty retailers opened stores in the mall, and management undertook periodic interior updates and leasing adjustments to maintain occupancy.

Bergner's, an original anchor at Market Place, closed in August 2018 as part of the liquidation of the Bon-Ton department store chain. Later that year General Growth Properties completed the sale of its mall portfolio, including Market Place, to Brookfield Properties. In April 2019, it was announced that Costco would construct a new warehouse store on the site of the former Bergner's wing, and the Champaign City Council approved financial incentives for the project that July. Demolition of the Bergner's building and portions of the western mall corridor began in late 2019, reducing the mall's gross leasable area as inline tenants such as Old Navy and LensCrafters relocated to other spaces within the center. Costco opened its Market Place location in October 2020.
