= Market square =

Square meant for trading, in which a market is held

A market square (also known as a market place) is an urban square meant for trading, in which a market is held. It is an important feature of many towns and cities around the world. A market square is an open area where market stalls are traditionally set out for trading, commonly on one particular day of the week known as market day.

A typical English market square consists of a square or rectangular area, or sometimes just a widening of the main street. It is usually in the centre of the town, surrounded by major buildings such as the parish church, town hall, important shops and hotels, and the post office, together with smaller shops and business premises. There is sometimes a permanent covered market building or a cloth hall, and the entire area is a traditional meeting place for local people as well as a centre for trade.

== Gallery ==
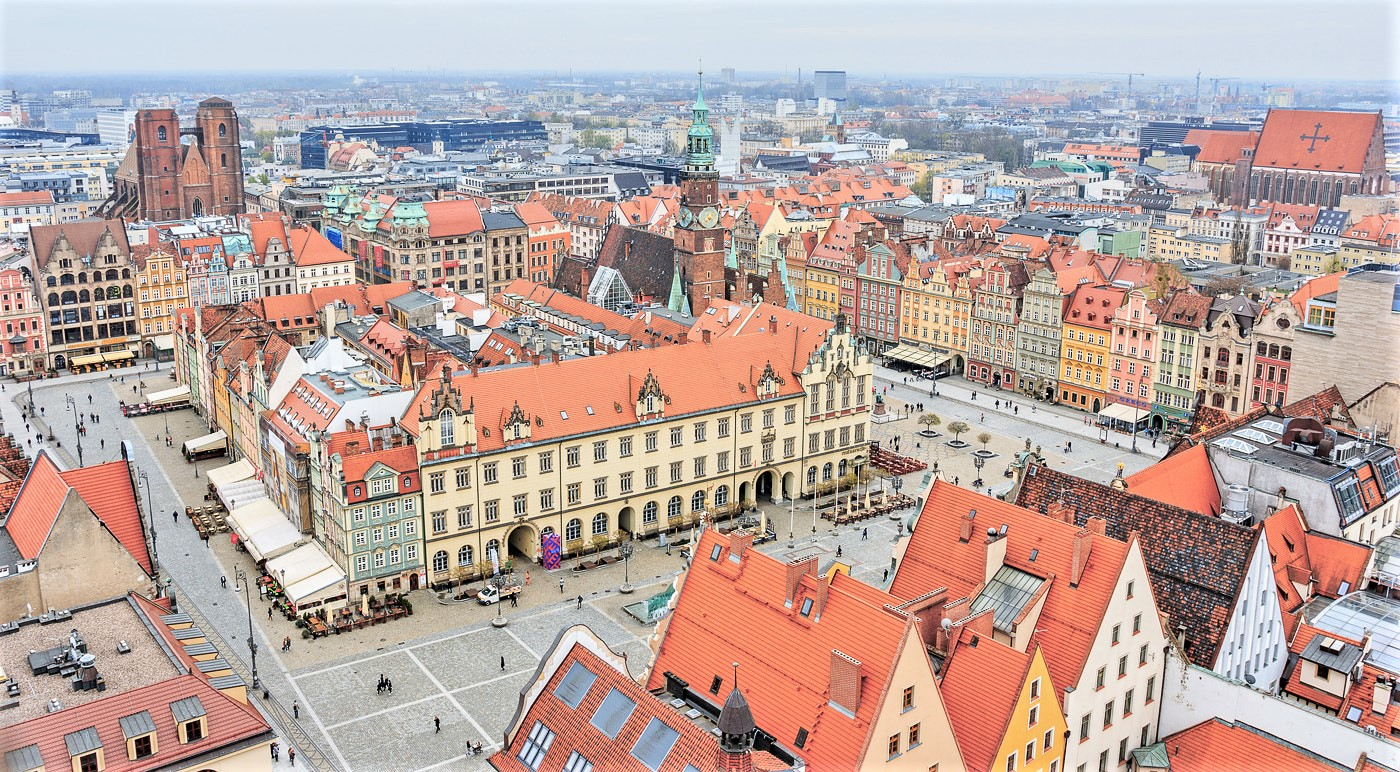
Market Square, Wrocław, Poland

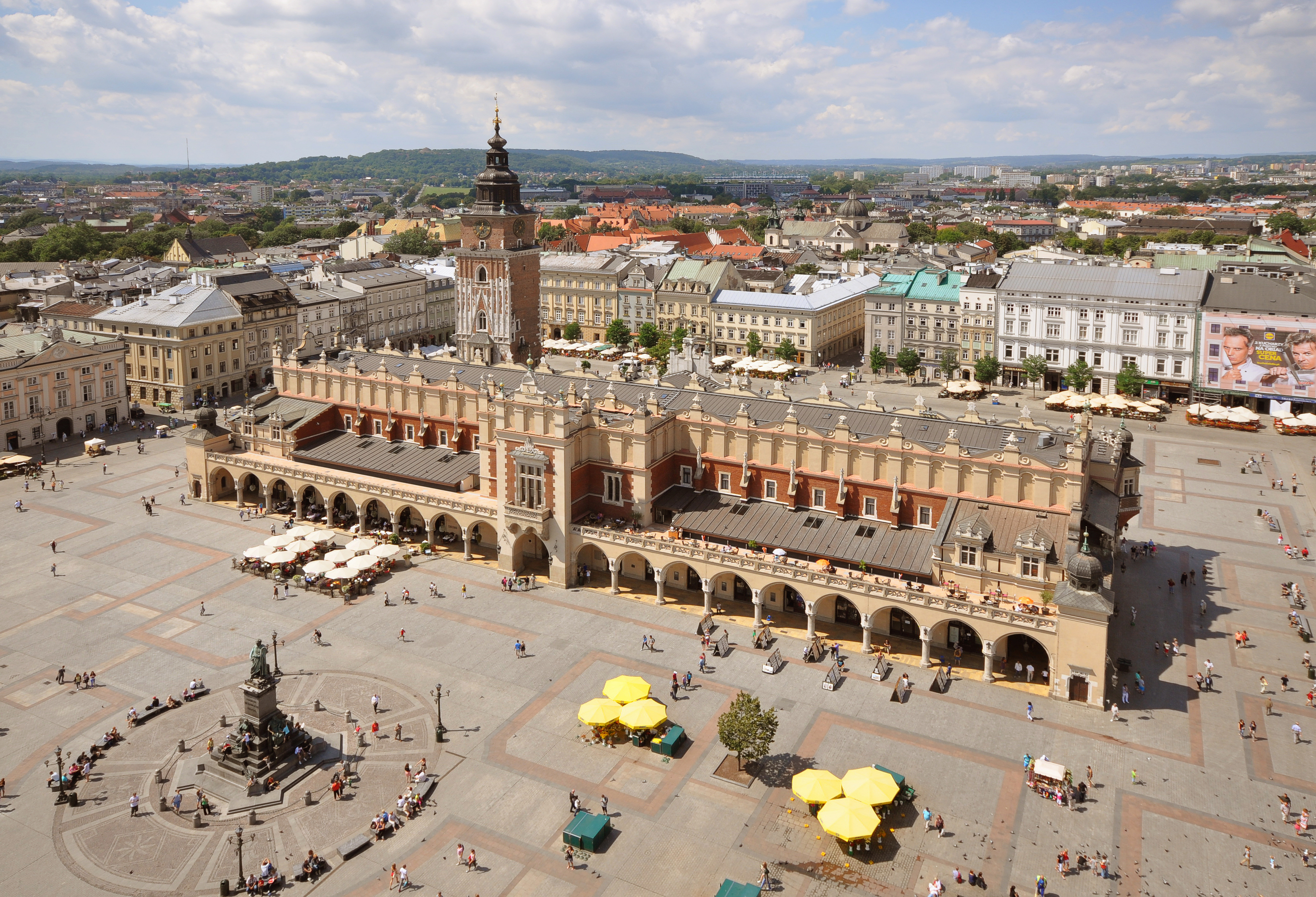
Main Square, Kraków, Poland

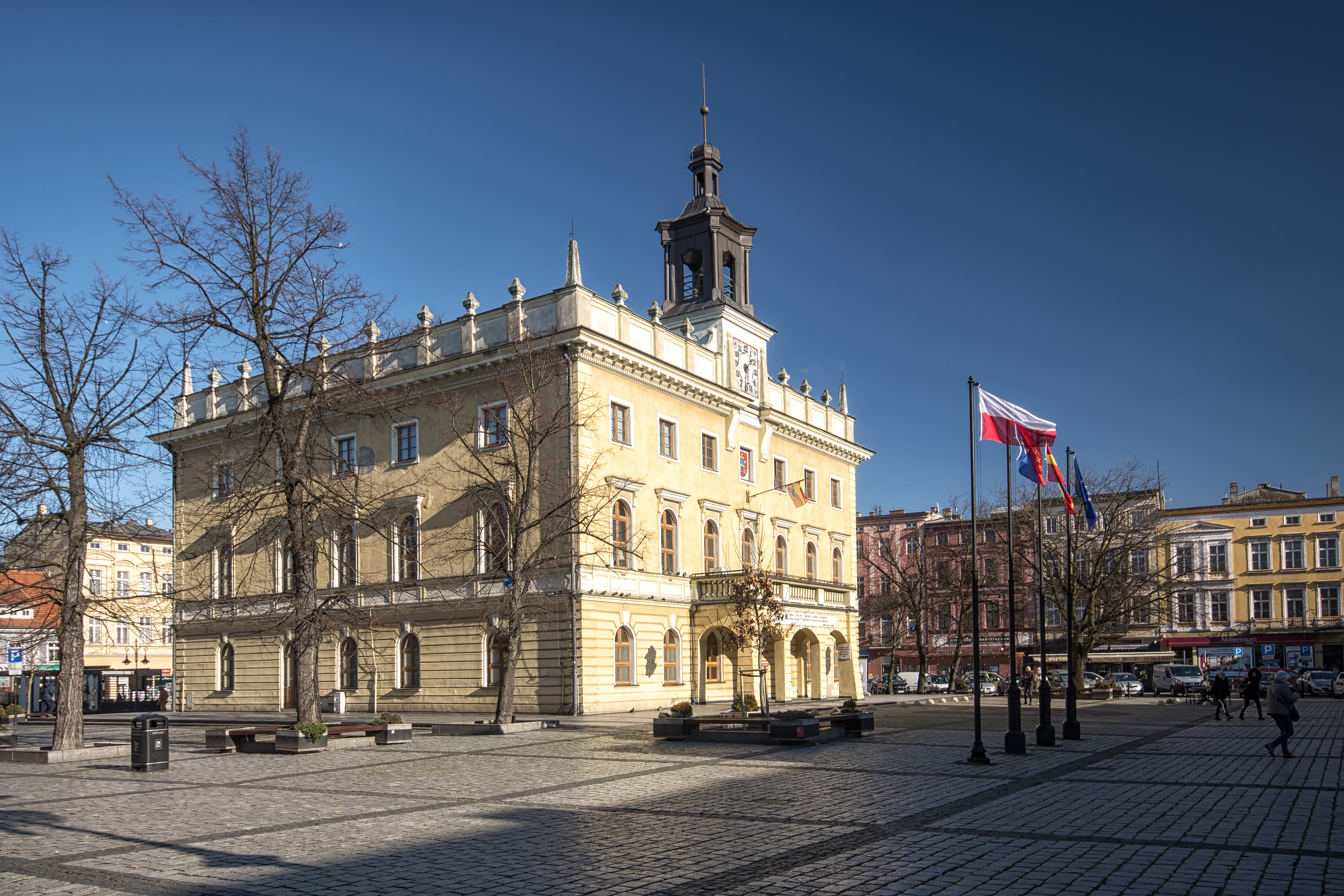
Market Square in Ostrów Wielkopolski, Poland

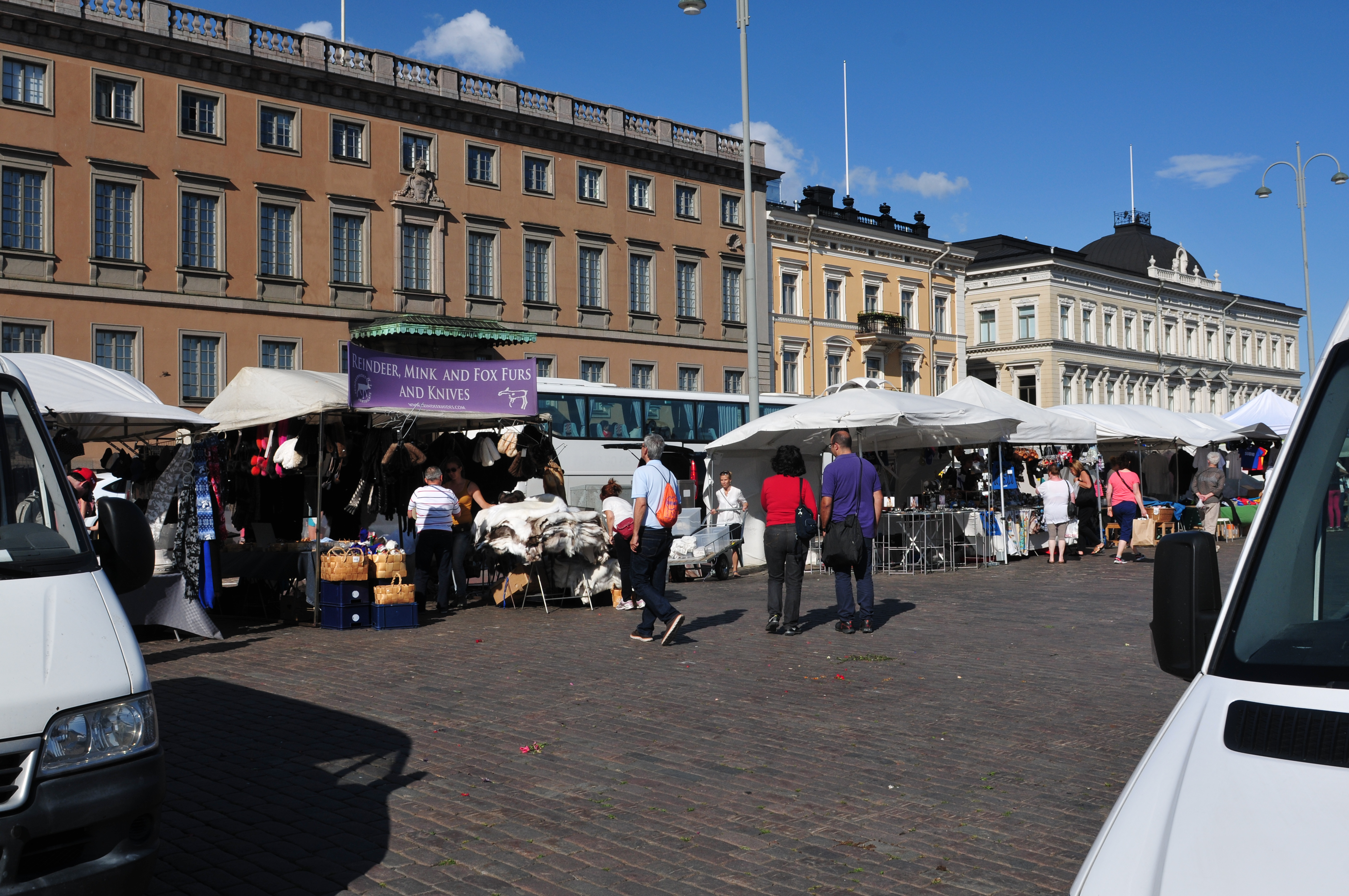
Market Square, Helsinki, Finland

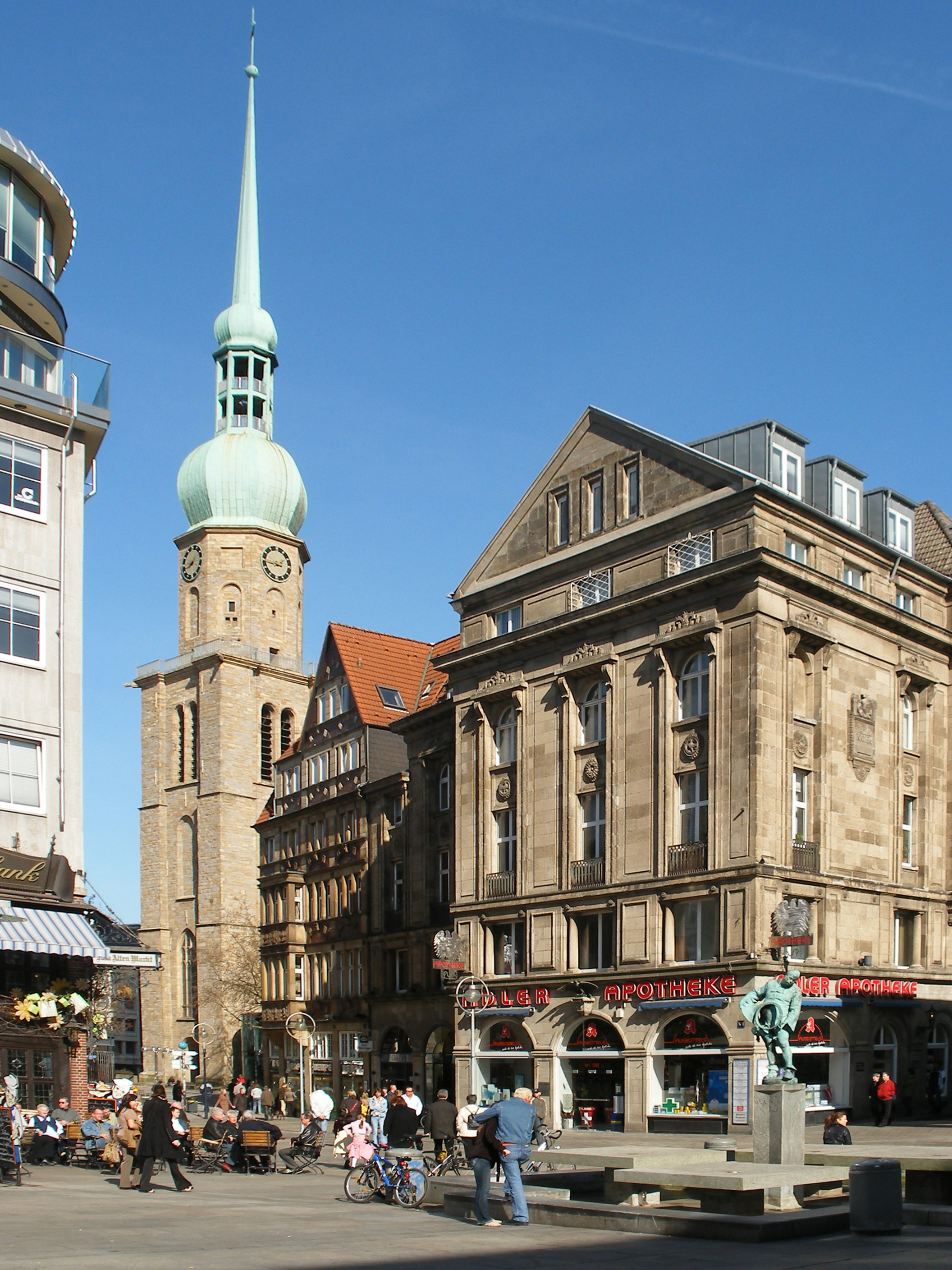
Market Square in Dortmund, Westphalia, Germany

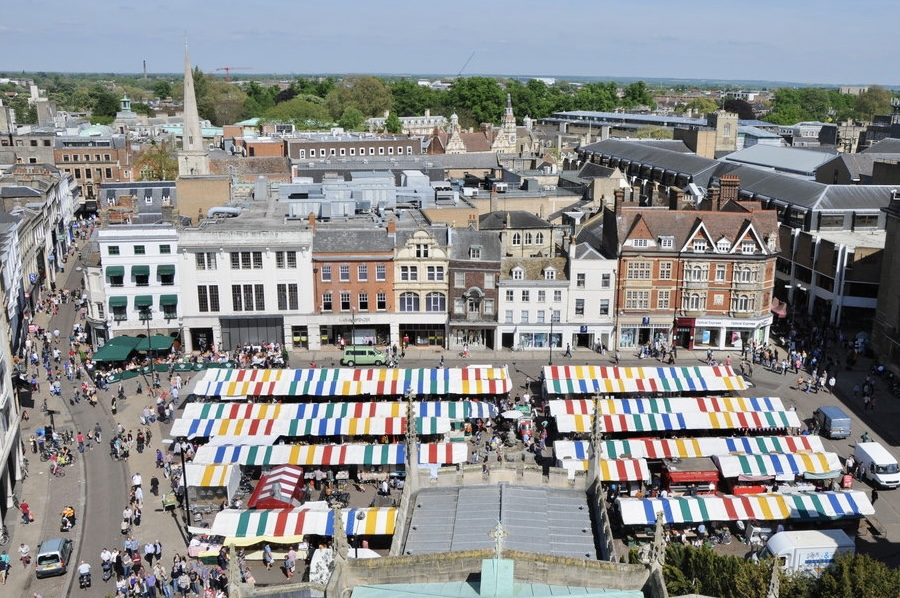
Market square in Cambridge, Cambridgeshire, England

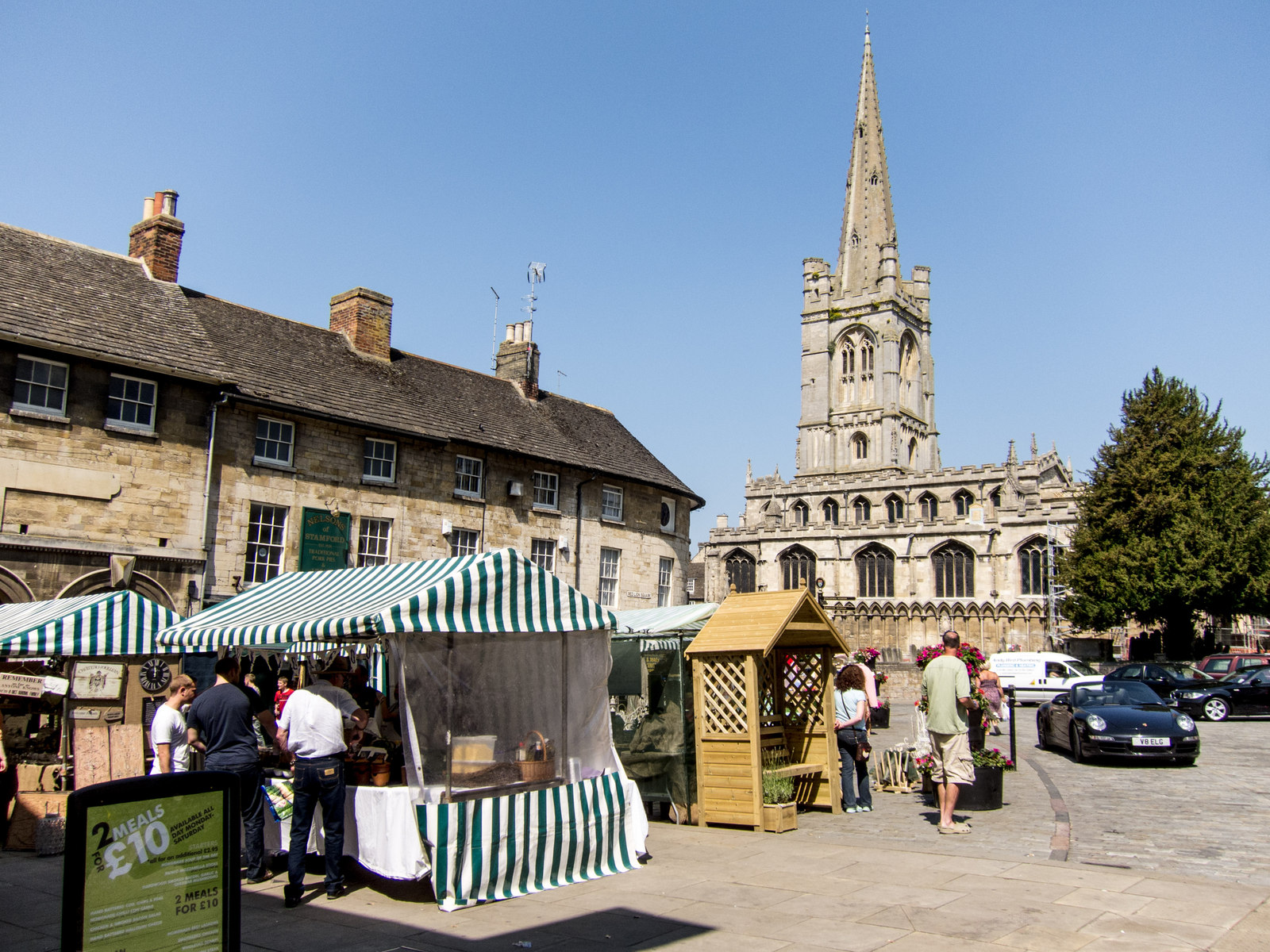
Market square in Stamford, Lincolnshire, England

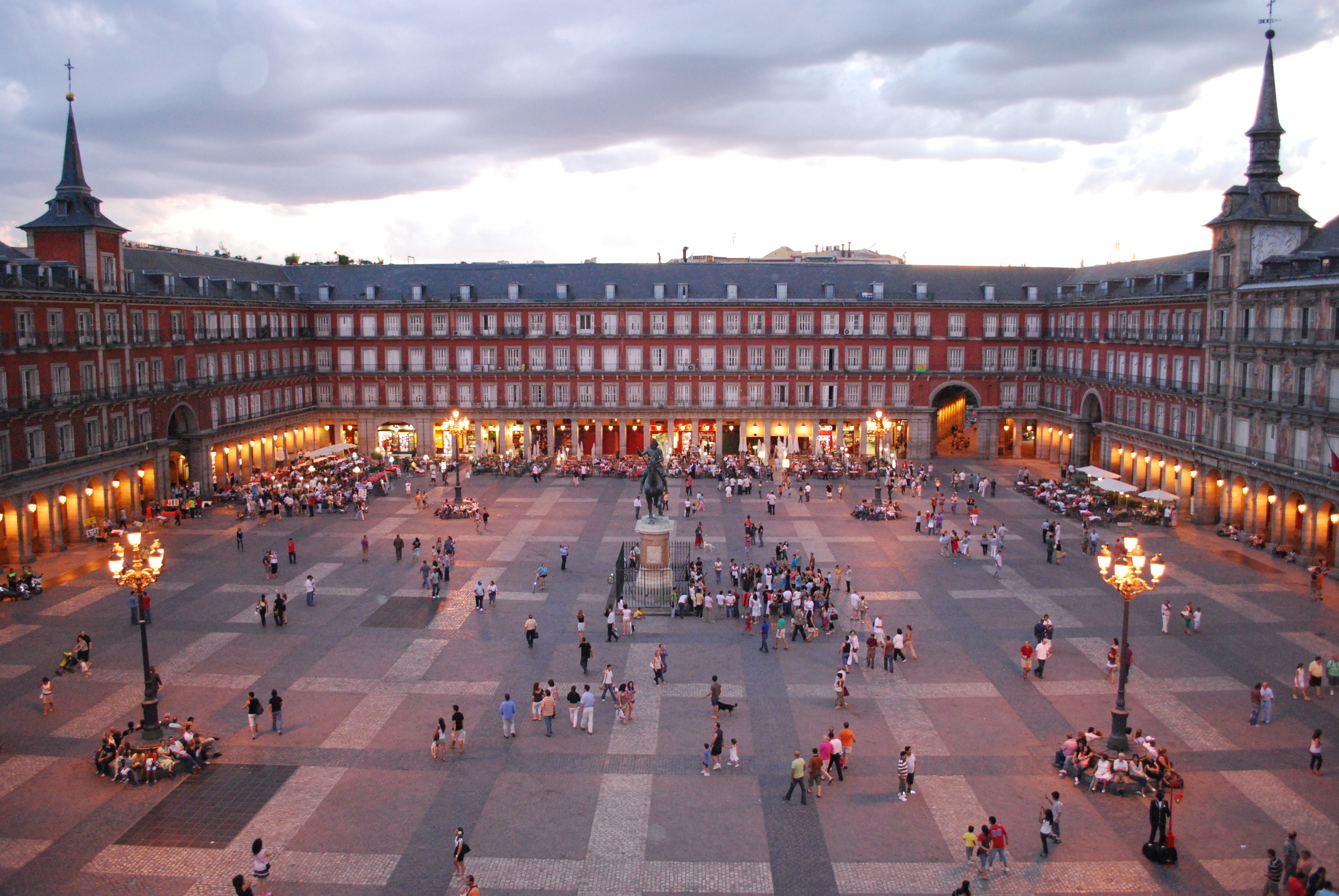
Market square in Madrid, Spain

== See also ==
- List of city squares
- List of city squares by size
- Marketplace
- Markt
- Piazza
- Plateia
- Plaza
