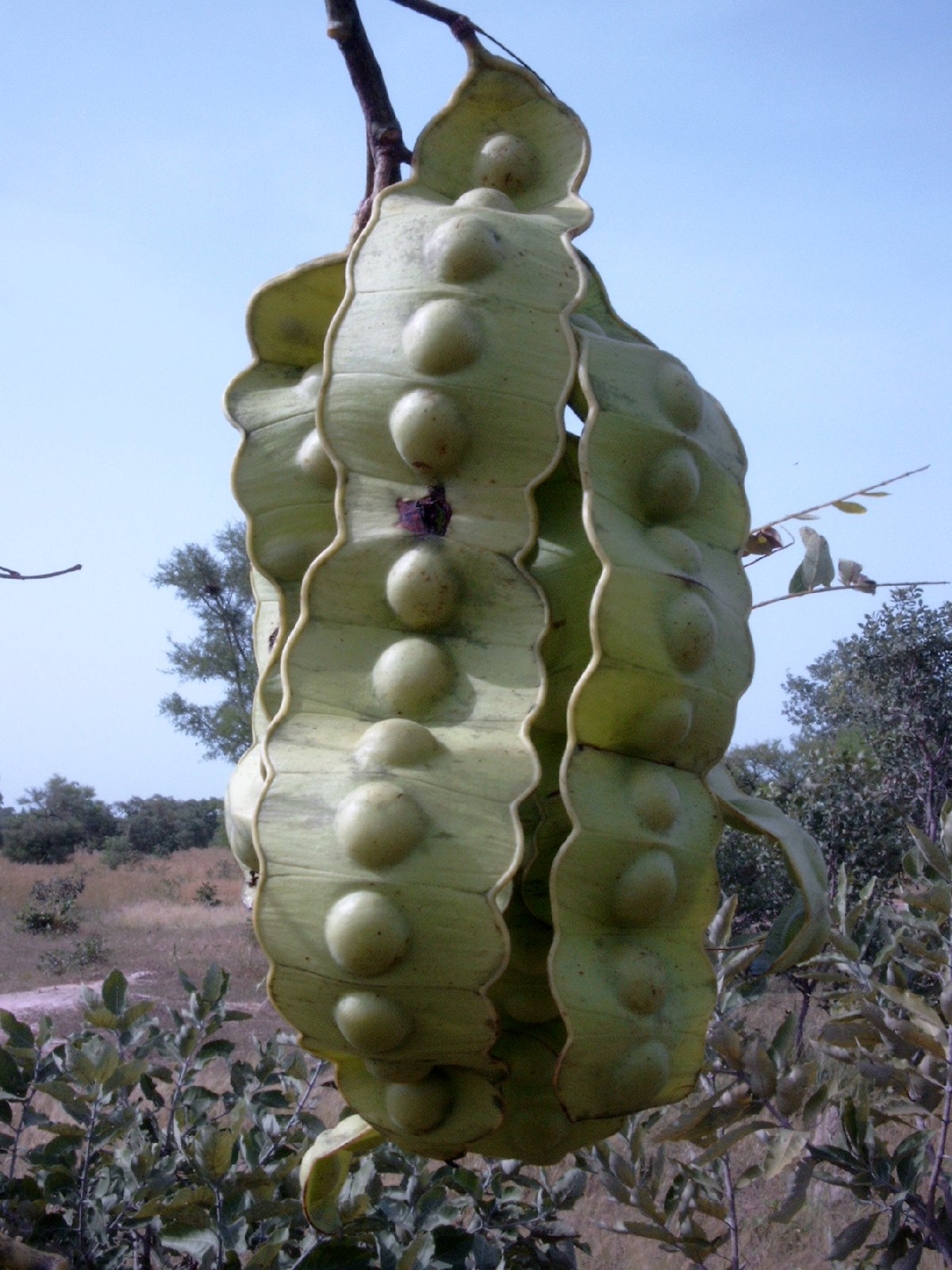
- Entada africana fruit

Scientific classification
- Kingdom: Plantae
- Clade: Tracheophytes
- Clade: Angiosperms
- Clade: Eudicots
- Clade: Rosids
- Order: Fabales
- Family: Fabaceae
- Subfamily: Caesalpinioideae
- Clade: Mimosoid clade
- Genus: Entada; Adans.

Type species
- Entada monostachya DC.

Species
- See text

Synonyms
- Elephantorrhiza Benth.; Entadopsis Britton; Gigalobium P. Browne; Perima Raf.; Pusaetha L. ex Kuntze; Strepsilobus Raf.

= Entada =

Genus of legumes

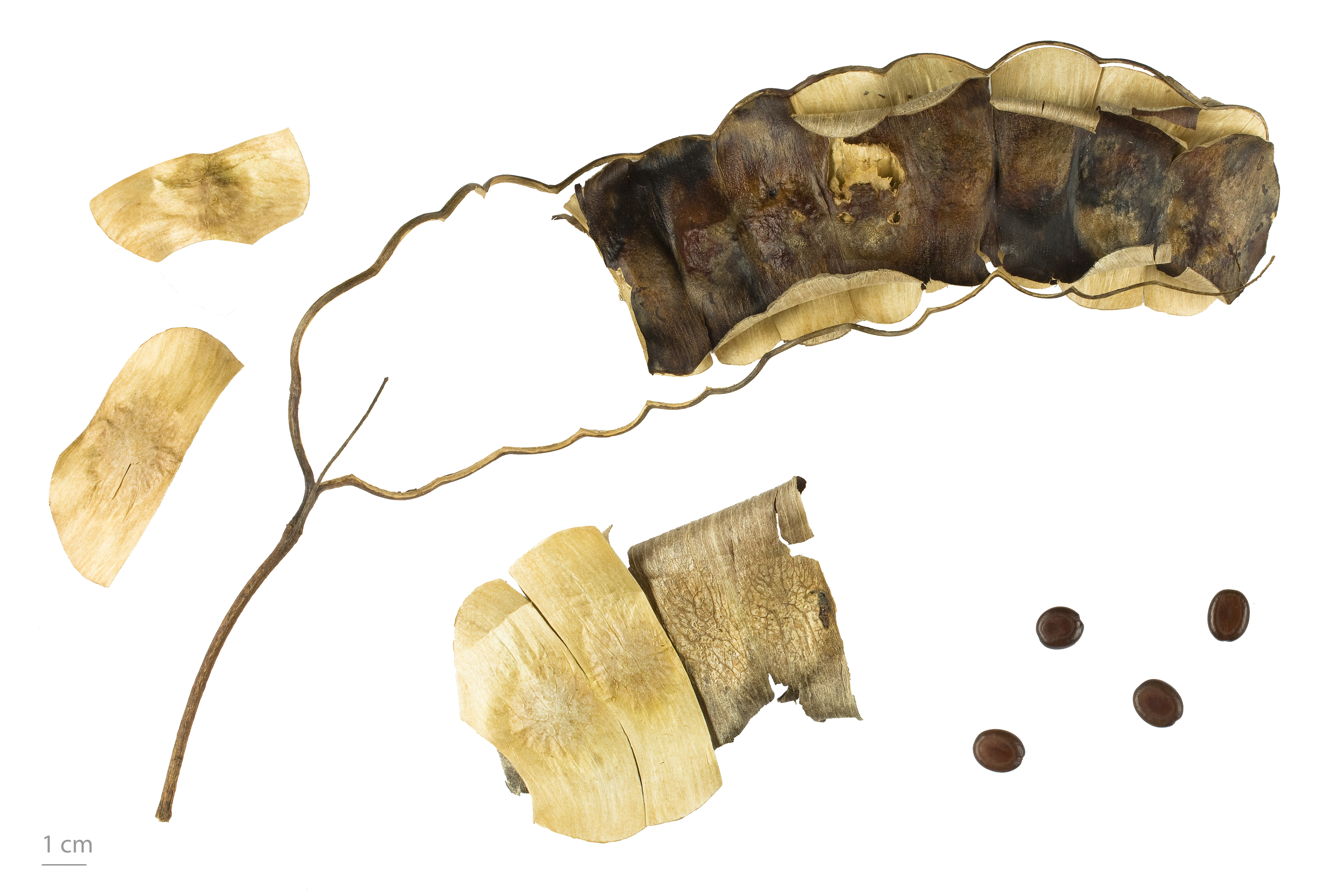
Entada abyssinica - MHNT

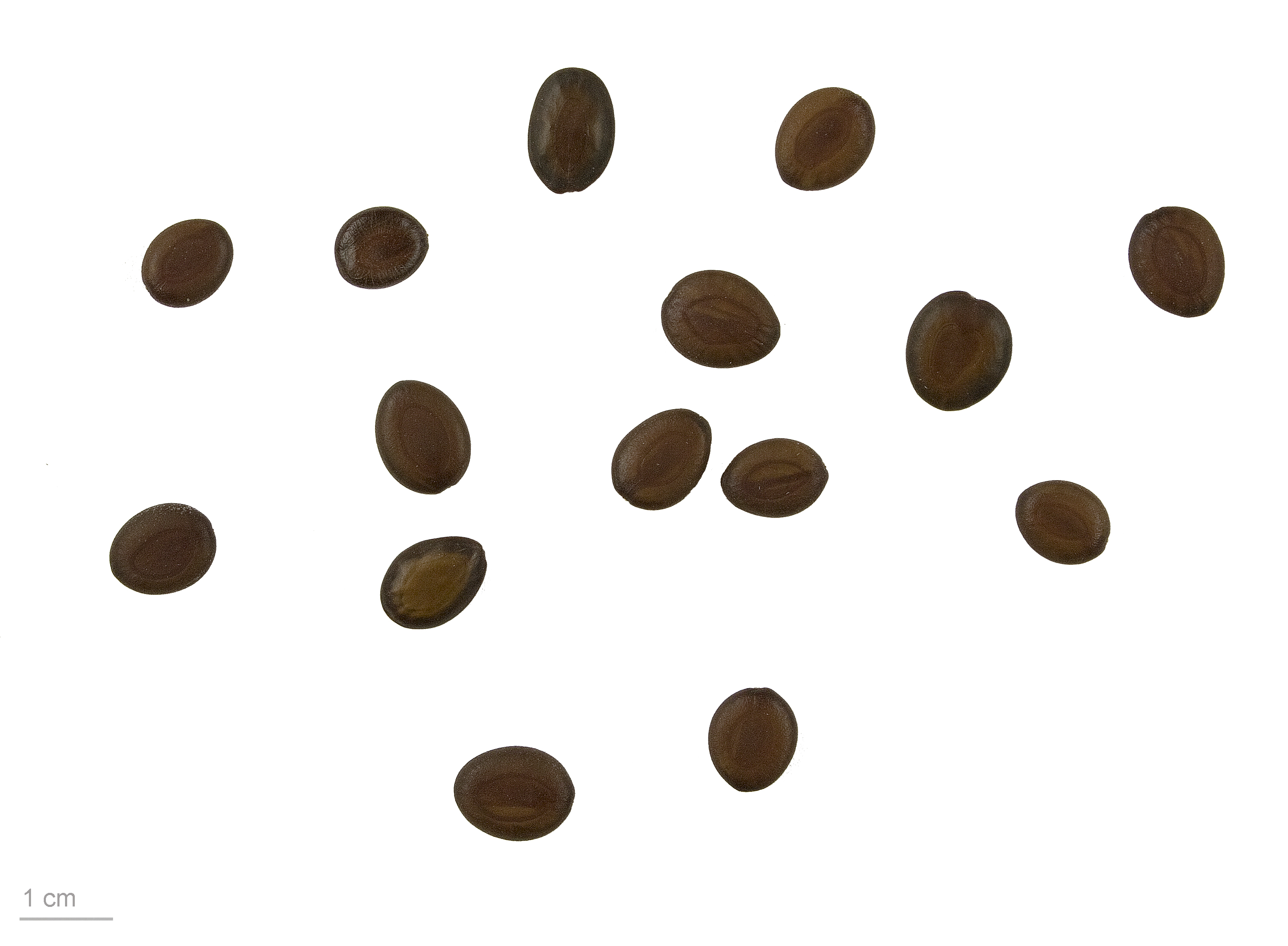
Entada africana- MHNT

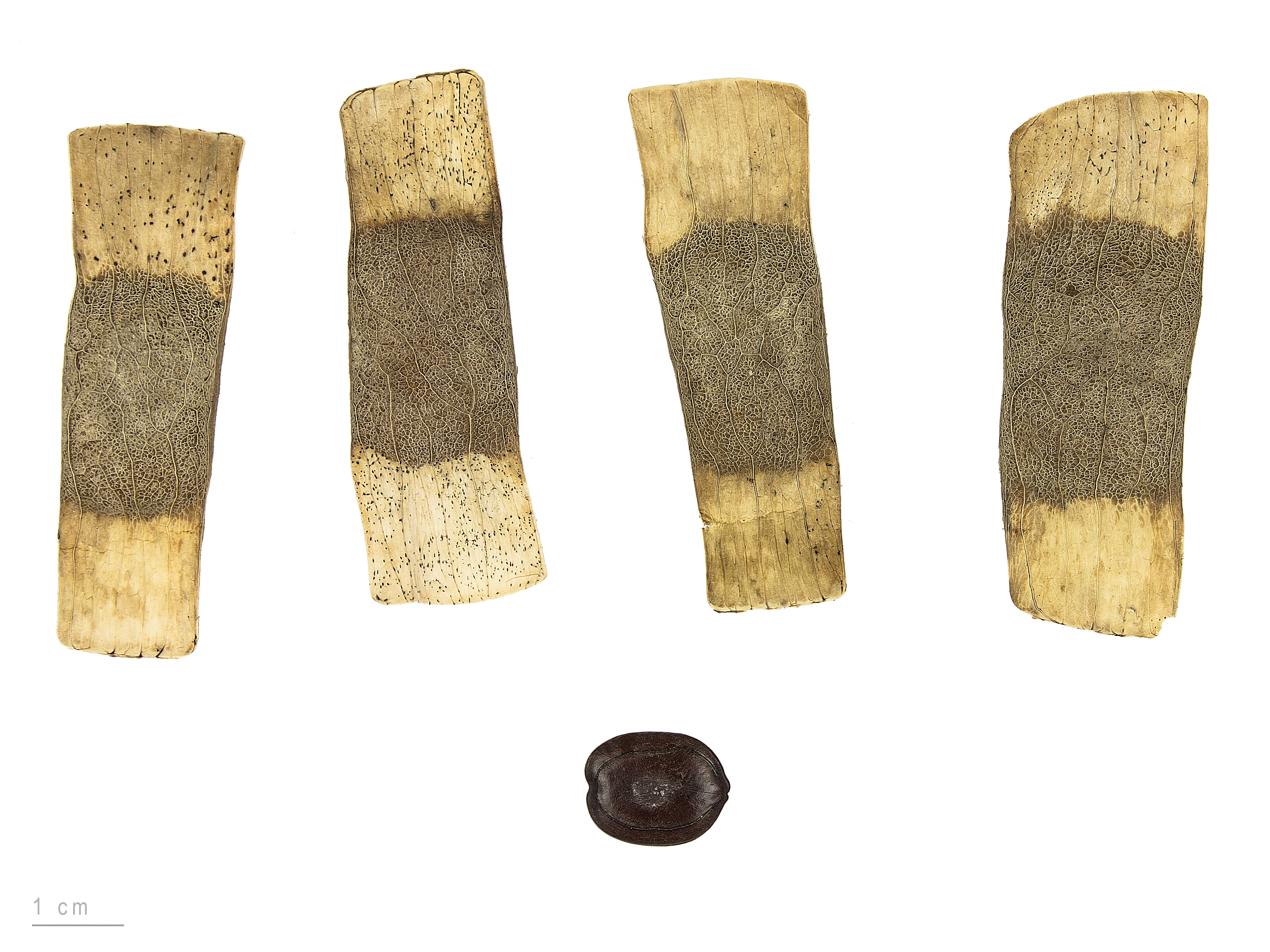
Entada polyphylla - MHNT

Entada is a genus of flowering plants in the family Fabaceae, in the mimosoid clade of the subfamily Caesalpinioideae. It consists of some 30 species of trees, shrubs and tropical lianas. About 21 species are known from Africa, six from Asia, two from the American tropics and one with a pantropical distribution. They have compound leaves and produce exceptionally large seedpods of up to 1.5 metres (4.9 ft) long. Their seeds are buoyant and survive lengthy journeys via rivers and ocean currents, to eventually wash up on tropical beaches. According to Menninger the liana species of Entada can grow up to 30 m (98 ft) longer in eighteen months. According to Dr. Bruno Kremer of the University of Cologne, Entada spp. "beats all records for longitudinal growth" reaching lengths "between 300 and 400 metres (980 and 1,310 ft)".

== Species ==
As of December 2025, Plants of the World Online accepts the following 40 species:

- Entada abyssinica Steud. ex A.Rich.
- Entada africana Guill. & Perr.
- Entada arenaria Schinz
- Entada bacillaris F.White
- Entada borneensis Ridl.
- Entada burkei (Benth.) S.A.O’Donnell & G.P.Lewis
- Entada camerunensis Villiers
- Entada chrysostachys (Benth.) Drake
- Entada dolichorrhachis Brenan
- Entada elephantina (Burch.) S.A.O’Donnell & G.P.Lewis
- Entada gigas (L.) Fawc. & Rendle - sea heart, cœur de la mer (Pantropical)
- Entada glandulosa Gagnep.
- Entada goetzei (Harms) S.A.O’Donnell & G.P.Lewis
- Entada hockii De Wild.
- Entada leptostachya Harms
- Entada louvelii (R.Vig.) Brenan
- Entada mannii (Oliv.) Tisser.
- Entada mossambicensis Torre
- Entada nudiflora Brenan
- Entada obliqua (Burtt Davy) S.A.O’Donnell & G.P.Lewis
- Entada parvifolia Merr.
- Entada pervillei (Vatke) R.Vig.
- Entada phaneroneura Brenan
- Entada phaseoloides (L.) Merr. - St. Thomas bean (Oceania, East Asia)
- Entada polyphylla Benth.
- Entada polystachia (L.) DC.
- Entada praetermissa (J.H.Ross) S.A.O’Donnell & G.P.Lewis
- Entada rangei (Harms) S.A.O’Donnell & G.P.Lewis
- Entada reticulata Gagnep.
- Entada rheedei Spreng. - snuff box (sea) bean (Africa, South Asia, Southeast Asia, Australia);
  synonyms: E. pursaetha DC., E. monostachya DC.
- Entada schinziana (Dinter) S.A.O’Donnell & G.P.Lewis
- Entada simplicata (Barneby) Sch.Rodr. & A.S.Flores
- Entada spinescens Brenan
- Entada spiralis Ridl.
- Entada stuhlmannii (Taub.) Harms
- Entada tonkinensis Gagnep.
- Entada tuberosa R.Vig.
- Entada wahlbergii Harv.
- Entada woodii (E.Phillips) S.A.O’Donnell & G.P.Lewis
- Entada zeylanica Kosterm.
