= Johann Michael Zeyher =

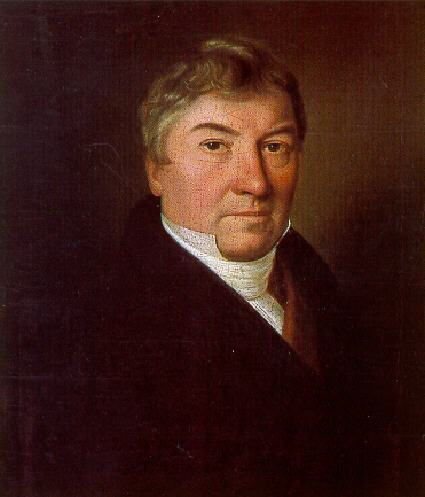
Johann Michael Zeyher

Johann Michael Zeyher (26 November 1770, in Obernzenn – 23 April 1843, in Schwetzingen) was a German gardener and horticulturist.

He studied at the Karlsschule in Stuttgart, and later worked as a volunteer under Hofgärtner (court gardener) Friedrich Schweickart in Karlsruhe. In 1792 he moved to Basel, where he subsequently became a court gardener. He later worked at the Grand Ducal gardens in Schwetzingen, where from 1806 to 1843 he held the position of director.

He was an uncle of naturalist Karl Ludwig Philipp Zeyher (1799–1858).

== Published works ==
- Beschreibung der Gartenanlagen zu Schwetzingen (with Georg Christian Roemer, 1809) – Description of the gardens at Schwetzingen.
- Verzeichniss der Gewaechse in dem Grossherzoglichen Garten zu Schwetzingen (1819) – Directory of the plants in the Grand Ducal garden at Schwetzingen.
- Schwezingen und seine Garten-Anlagen (with JG Rieger, 1826) – Schwezingen and its garden plants.
