= Johann Appler =

German Nazi Party politician (1892–1978)

Bürgermeister of Gunzenhausen
- In office 1 October 1935 – April 1945

Reichstag deputy
- In office 21 January 1933 – 8 May 1945

Personal details
- Born: Johann Paulus Appler; 13 June 1892 Obernzenn, Kingdom of Bavaria, German Empire
- Died: 21 December 1978 (aged 86) Gunzenhausen, West Germany
- Party: Nazi Party
- Other political affiliations: Völkisch-Social Bloc
- Civilian awards: Golden Party Badge

Military service
- Allegiance: German Empire; Weimar Republic
- Branch/service: Royal Bavarian Army; Reichswehr
- Years of service: 1912–1920
- Rank: Zugführer
- Unit: Royal Bavarian 10th Infantry Regiment "King Ludwig"
- Battles/wars: World War I
- Military awards: Iron Cross, 2nd class Bavarian Military Merit Cross, 2nd class with swords Wound Badge

Johann Paulus Appler (13 June 1892 – 21 December 1978) was a German soldier, civil servant and Nazi Party politician who served as a Reichstag deputy and the mayor of Gunzenhausen. He escaped from Germany after the end of the Second World War, but returned, was put on trial and briefly incarcerated.

== Youth and military service ==
Born at Obernzenn in 1892, Appler attended the elementary and advanced training school at Urphertshofen in Middle Franconia from 1898 to 1912. After graduating, he joined the Royal Bavarian 10th Infantry Regiment "King Ludwig" of the Bavarian Army and fought in the First World War from August 1914 to 1918, where he served as a Zugführer (platoon leader). He was seriously wounded in September 1914 and was awarded the Iron Cross, 2nd class, the Bavarian Military Merit Cross, 2nd class with swords and the Wound Badge. At the end of the war, he remained in the military but he was discharged from the Reichswehr in 1920. From 1922 to 1928, he worked as a customs officer in the border service. In 1928, he was transferred to the revenue service, working in the German civil service as a Reich tax official in Gunzenhausen until 1935. Between 1920 and 1928, Appler was a supporter of the Völkisch-Social Bloc, a right-wing electoral alliance.

== Nazi Party career ==
On 1 August 1928, Appler joined the Nazi Party (membership number 95,219). As an early Party member, he later would be awarded the Golden Party Badge. He became the Ortsgruppenleiter (local group leader) in Gunzenhausen in Gau Franconia until 1930. He then advanced to Bezirksleiter of the Party's Gunzenhausen district and then to Kreisleiter (county leader) until November 1940. In 1931, Appler founded the SS group in Gunzenhausen, which he led as an SS-Sturmführer. He was also a Gauredner (Gau speaker) for the Party and a member of the Sturmabteilung (SA), eventually attaining the rank of SA-Sturmbannführer.

On 21 January 1933, Appler was appointed to the Reichstag for electoral constituency 26 (Franconia) in the place of Wilhelm Stegmann, who had left the parliament. He retained his mandate in the elections after the Nazis seized power in that year, and retained this seat as a Reichstag deputy until Germany's surrender in the Second World War. Appointed second mayor of Gunzenhausen on 28 April 1933, Appler became first mayor (Bürgermeister) on 1 October 1935 and remained in that post until late April 1945 when the city was captured by American forces.

== Escape, later life and death ==
According to documents from the central office in Ludwigsburg, Appler managed to escape to Spain in 1945, from where he left for Cairo, Egypt in 1946. There he converted to Islam and lived under the name Salah Chaffar. After returning to Germany, he was charged with breach of the peace in September 1949 and sentenced to six months in prison, presumably for his significant participation in the Kristallnacht of 1938. Two further criminal proceedings ended in November 1949 and September 1950 with acquittals. Appler continued to live in Gunzenhausen until his death on 21 December 1978.
