= Karl Ludwig Philipp Zeyher =

Botanical and insect collector (1799–1858)

- Born: August 2, 1799; Dillenburg, Hessen, Holy Roman Empire
- Died: December 13, 1858 (aged 59); Cape Town, Cape Colony
- Siglum: Zeyh.
- Known for: Botanical collector in South Africa, collaborated with Christian Friedrich Ecklon
- Scientific career
- Fields: Botany

Karl Ludwig Philipp Zeyher (2 August 1799 Dillenburg, Hessen, Holy Roman Empire – 13 December 1858 Cape Town), was a botanical and insect collector who collected extensively in Cape Colony. He was the author, with Christian Friedrich Ecklon, of Enumeratio Plantarum Africae Australis (1835-7), a descriptive catalogue of South African plants.

In 1816 Zeyher was apprenticed to his uncle Johann Michael Zeyher who was head gardener at the ducal gardens of Schwetzingen. Here he met Franz Sieber and was talked into a partnership with the aim of collecting and selling natural history specimens - a burgeoning industry in the 19th century. They sailed for Mauritius in August 1822, however Zeyher was left at the Cape while Sieber went on to Mauritius and Australia. On his return in April 1824, Sieber picked up the specimens collected by Zeyher, assuring him of payment in due course. Sieber distributed a number of these specimens in his exsiccata named Flora Capensis. No payment ever materialised and Zeyher became aware that he would be forced to operate on his own. He journeyed east to Uitenhage in 1825 and north beyond Clanwilliam in 1828. The resulting specimens were sent to his uncle at Schwetzingen.

In 1829 Ecklon returned to the Cape from Europe where he had sold his specimens through the Unio Itineraria run by Christian Ferdinand Friedrich Hochstetter (1787-1860) and Ernst Gottlieb von Steudel (1783-1856) at Esslingen. Zeyher and Ecklon decided to collaborate in their collecting. Ecklon sailed for Algoa Bay to collect in the Eastern Cape and Zeyher travelled north by ox-wagon. Zeyher's route took him through the Clanwilliam and Cederberg area, from where he followed the Olifants River to its mouth. Here Zeyher ran across Drege on 23 May 1831. He collected in the area for some time, travelling on to Bitterfontein and the Kamiesberge. From here he went further north up to the Orange River, eventually reaching its mouth. Little rain had fallen and the landscape was parched, causing considerable losses among his oxen.

In the meanwhile Ecklon had returned to Cape Town from his trip, and put some work into his collection while awaiting Zeyher. They met up again at Tulbagh, where they scaled the mountains in the area as well as going up the Groot Winterhoekberg, gathering a rich collection of plants.

== Expedition to Kaffraria 1831-32 ==
Ecklon and Zeyher left Cape Town in October 1831 on a collecting trip to the eastern borders of the Cape Colony. Passing through Caledon they went down to Cape Agulhas and back to Swellendam, where they once again came across Drege on 5 November 1831. Crossing the Langeberg into the Karoo, they collected extensively along the Gourits River and the Swartberg. Turning south again they crossed the Outeniqua Mountains, visiting George and Knysna, before following the Langkloof to Uitenhage and Algoa Bay, from where they shipped their collection back to Cape Town.

Travelling further north through the Albany and Somerset East districts, then east over the Fish, Koonap and Kat Rivers, and again north over the Winterberg, they came to Tamboekieland in the area of the present Queenstown. From here they followed the Kei River to its source in the Stormberg.

By this time their collections had grown so large that Ecklon was detailed to leave for Europe in 1832 to dispose of the specimens. Zeyher remained in Tamboekieland since Drege notes that he met him at Shiloh Mission south of Queenstown on 29 November 1832. Zeyher then returned to Uitenhage where he found employment in the service of Joachim Brehm, an apothecary and collector who had created one of the finest gardens in the Eastern Cape. At this time Ecklon was in Hamburg seeing to the publication of their joint paper Enumeratio Plantarum Africae Australis which appeared in three parts between 1834 and 1837. With Ecklon he issued the exsiccata Plantae Africae australis extratropicae. Apparently Ecklon's visit to Hamburg was cut short by a warehouse fire that destroyed the greater part of their collections. Financially Ecklon was crippled and sold his personal set of specimens to Sonder before returning to the Cape in late 1837 or early 1838. He lived for another 30 years, but his mental and physical strength had been broken by the setbacks and he ceased collecting.

Zeyher had in turn become dispirited by events, and had struck out on his own before Ecklon's return. He went back to the Uitenhage area and forwarded his new collections to WJ Hooker and N. B. Ward of London. While in Uitenhage, Zeyher had put together an extensive collection of indigenous wood samples together with flowering and fruiting herbarium specimens. These were destined for the Berlin Museum and a favourable price had been agreed upon. Misfortune continued to haunt Zeyher, however, and the ship carrying this precious collection was lost at sea.

== Expedition to the South African plateau with Joseph Burke 1840-1842 ==
Zeyher accompanied Joseph Burke in an organised expedition under the sponsorship of lord Derby and collected a substantial quantity of botanical specimens.

== Botanical legacy ==
Zeyher is commemorated in the genera Zeyheria Mart., Zeyherella (Engl.) Aubrèv. & Pellegr. and in a large number of specific names. His personal herbarium is at the South African Museum, though Karl Wilhelm Ludwig Pappe (1803-1862) replaced most of the labels with his own.

Specimens collected by Zeyher are cared for at multiple institutions, including the Swedish Museum of Natural History, the University of Oslo herbarium, and the National Herbarium of Victoria, Royal Botanic Gardens Victoria.
