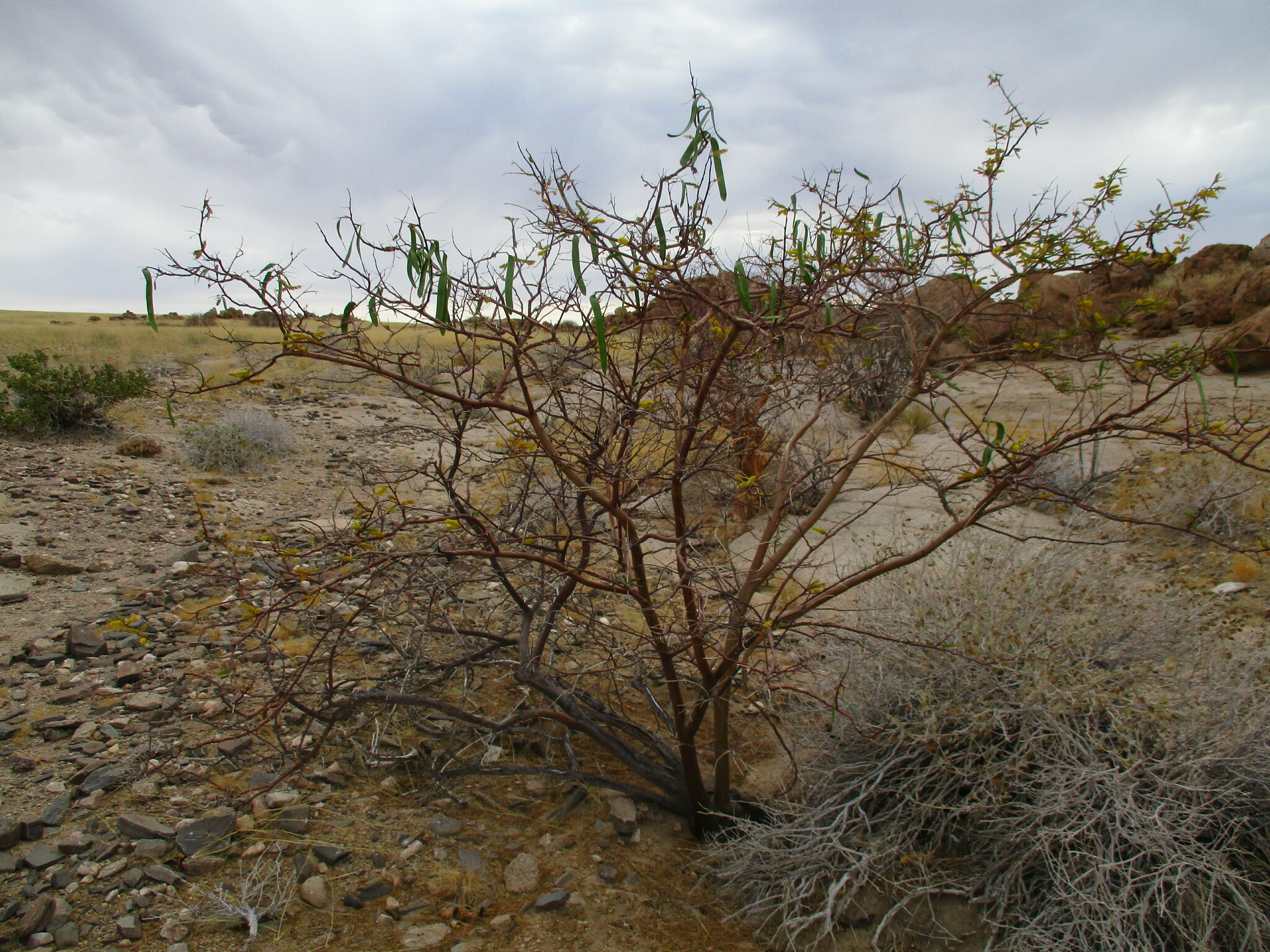

Scientific classification
- Kingdom: Plantae
- Clade: Tracheophytes
- Clade: Angiosperms
- Clade: Eudicots
- Clade: Rosids
- Order: Fabales
- Family: Fabaceae
- Subfamily: Caesalpinioideae
- Clade: Mimosoid clade
- Genus: Entada
- Species: E. rangei

Binomial name
- Entada rangei (Harms) S.A.O'Donnell & G.P.Lewis (2022)

Synonyms
- Elephantorrhiza rangei Harms (1913); Elephantorrhiza suffruticosa Schinz (1893)

= Entada rangei =

Species of legume

Entada rangei, commonly known as the skew-leaved elephant-root, is a species of flowering plant in the family Fabaceae. It is a deciduous, multi-stemmed shrub or rarely a tree of 4 to 8 meters tall, which may be found on hills as well as plains. The type material was obtained south of Humbe, Angola. E. rangei of southern Namibia is now considered a synonym.

== Range and status ==
It is native to Tanzania, Malawi, Mozambique, Zimbabwe, northern South Africa, southern Angola and northwestern Namibia. An isolated population is present in southern Namibia. The species is not threatened.

== Description ==
The stems and branches are smooth and reddish-brown. During spring or early summer, while still leafless, long, sulphur-yellow flower spikes decorate the plants. Large pods are formed in autumn. The seeds are prominently enveloped by the valves, which are dark brown when ripe. The valves split open and curl back, after detaching from the thickened margins.

The large feathery leaves, reminiscent of Jacaranda leaves, appear in summer. They are bipinnate with up to 31 pairs of pinnae, each carrying up to 50 pairs of very small leaflets. The latter are very asymmetric with the midrib running along their extreme inner edge, rather than the middle, hence its vernacular name.

== Taxonomy ==
Elephantorrhiza rangei Harms was named for Paul Range (1879-1952), a naturalist and geologist who travelled extensively in Namibia. In 1908 he collected material of an isolated population in dry savanna beside the Löwen River, at Naute in southern Namibia. The Naute Dam, one of Namibia's largest dams, may have submerged a part of this local population's habitat after its construction in 1970-1972. E. rangei was feared extinct until a single plant was located near the dam wall in 2005. Its features and measurements were however determined to fall within the known variation of E. suffruticosa, and the two were placed in synonymy.
