= Joseph Burke (botanist) =

British explorer and naturalist

Joseph Burke (12 June 1812 in Bristol, England – 23 January 1873 in Harrisonville, US) was a collector of plants and animals for Lord Derby.

== 1839–1840 ==
Burke was employed as a gardener for Lord Derby, an enthusiastic natural history collector with his own menagerie at Prescot, Lancashire. In 1839 Lord Derby commissioned Karl Zeyher to collect plants and animals in southern Africa, delegating Burke to organise the expedition.

Burke left London on the vessel "Joanna" in December 1839 and arrived in Cape Town in March 1840. From here he went on to "Vygekraal" (about 3 km SE of Table Bay), the home of Rev. Fry and an agent of Lord Derby. Here he arranged for a wagon and oxen to transport him, and set out on 23 May to Uitenhage where he planned to meet up with Zeyher for their joint expedition to the hinterland to the north. A smallpox outbreak in Cape Town caused usually hospitable farmers along the way to bar their homes to visitors, creating accommodation problems for Burke. Exasperated by the slow progress of his wagon, he left it in the vicinity of the Swartberg and went ahead on foot. Arriving in Uitenhage, he found that Zeyher had not prepared for the expedition, and that supplies that were to have been sent to Algoa Bay, had not arrived. Chafing at the delay, Burke returned to Cape Town on 2 August with some animals that Zeyher had obtained for Lord Derby, and arrived back in Algoa Bay on 27 August. Here he awaited the arrival of his supplies which eventually landed on 9 November. At last on 17 November 1840, the expedition, which consisted of a train of three wagons, set out northwards from Uitenhage, arriving at Cradock on 3 December. From here they crossed the Great Fish River and reached the Orange River on 19 December. The Caledon River, which was in spate on Christmas Day, could only be crossed on 29 January 1841, and then only by way of dismantling all the wagons and ferrying them across piecemeal.

== 1841 ==
They reached Thaba Nchu on 15 February 1841 and continued north across the Vet River. Difficulties with the purchase of horses delayed their departure until mid-April. After crossing the Sand and Vals Rivers, they reached Kroonstad where they spent some days collecting and preserving birds. On 8 May they reached the Vaal River, and were prevented from crossing it until 17 May, by an outbreak of severe weather with snow and rain on 13 May. Continuing northwards they met one of the Voortrekker leaders Andries Potgieter at present-day Potchefstroom in May 1841. Heading further north they made their way to the Magaliesberg entering the Magalies River catchment on 31 May. The Magalies River valley was teeming with game, and they spent 2 weeks shooting and skinning a large variety of mammals and birds, including hippopotamus, black rhino, eland, zebra, kudu, waterbuck and wildebeest. On 12 June they reached the Crocodile River near Hartebeespoort and added to their collection buffalo, tsessebe and crocodile. By now Burke felt that his collection was sufficiently representative and that his wagons were close to capacity. They set off on a trip to the salt pan near Pretoria about two days away. Here they encountered giraffe and a number of birds not previously seen. Burke described this bushveld region as grassland densely covered with Acacia and other tree species as far as the eye could see. They had arrived at the southernmost extension of the African savanna in the inland plateau. Burke left the salt pan on 7 August and returned to their Magaliesberg camp, and on 24 August headed west to Marikana and Sterkstroom. They followed this stream north as far as its junction with the Crocodile River, which they reached on 29 August, and at which place they shot their first white rhino. They followed the Crocodile further north to the Pienaars River confluence, reaching the most northerly point of their expedition. Burke recorded that the area was teeming with rhino and lion; they made camp here and stayed for several weeks, collecting numerous specimens and live young animals. On 26 October they broke camp and moved east, following the Pienaars River, almost to the salt pan they had visited previously. They thereupon returned to their camp in the Magaliesberg and on 17 November received a visit from the Swedish naturalist Wahlberg, who had travelled up from Port Natal. They made a few minor excursions before starting on the return journey on 14 December 1841. Following the course of the Magalies River upstream, they reached Potchefstroom on 26 December and came across an Erythrina (most probably E. zeyheri Harv.) in full flower. This species is remarkable in that it is in effect an underground tree which only appears above ground during the flowering season, spending the winter months in a state of dormancy.

== 1842 ==
Making good progress, they crossed the Vaal River on 1 January 1842 and the Orange River on 4 February. From here they deviated from their outward route and travelled west to Colesberg, where they arrived on 18 February. Striking further west, they reached Klein Tafelberg on 4 March and Beaufort West by 9 April. Along the Gamka River, Burke captured several eland and noted that some of his other animals had died. They crossed the Dwyka River on 3 May and the Hex River Pass on 22 May and were back at Vygekraal on 7 June, almost two and a half years after landing at Table Bay. Burke sailed for Britain in July 1842, taking back an "immense collection of living and dead animals and dried plants, seeds, bulbs etc"; the plant specimens finding their way to Kew.

Burke kept a journal detailing his travels, from which excerpts were published by William Jackson Hooker in the London Journal of Botany in 1846. Most of the expedition's botanising was by Zeyher, as Burke's interest lay primarily in mammals. Nevertheless, Burke did maintain a personal collection of plants, yielding many unrecorded species. Hooker named the monotypic African genus Burkea after him, while he was also commemorated in the species' names Acacia burkei, Elephantorrhiza burkei, Hoodia burkei, and Drosera burkeana. His plant specimens are in the herbarium of Kew Gardens.

Burke got married in December 1842 after his return to Britain and later settled in the United States. He subsequently went on a joint expedition with collectors from Kew to Hudson Bay and California, settled 180 acres in Cass County, Missouri, successfully participated in the California Gold Rush on 1849, and served as a First Lieutenant in the Union Army during the United States Civil War (even as family members served in the Confederate Army).

Joseph was born May 13, 1812, in Bristol, England, and died at age 60 in Cass County, Harrisonville, MO, US, on January 23, 1873. He was married to Elizabeth Walker, from Ormskirk, Lancashire, and had 3 children in the UK and 6 children in the USA. Elizabeth died at age 92 on March 15, 1913, also in Harrisonville.
