= Wilhelm Stegmann =

Wilhelm Ferdinand Stegmann
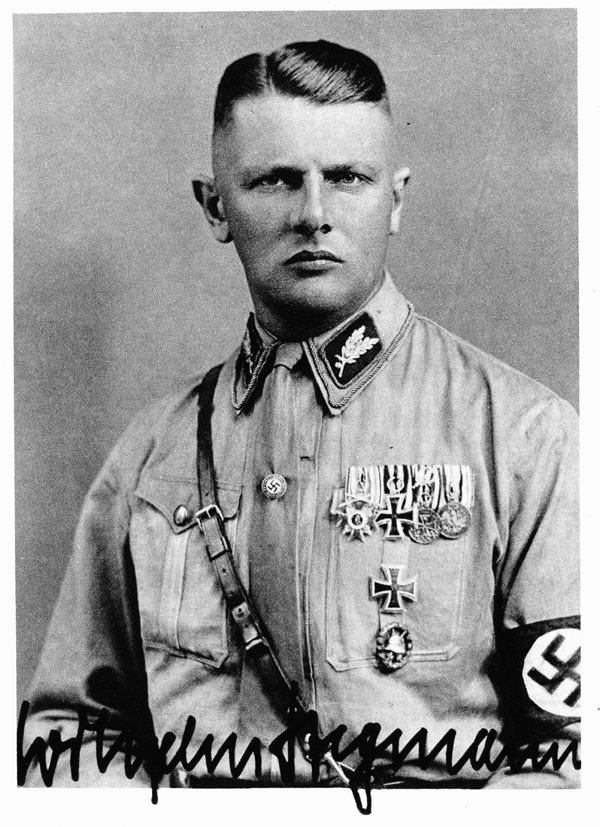
- Born: 13 June 1899; Munich, Germany
- Died: 15 December 1944 (aged 45); Šahy
- Alma mater: Technical University of Munich
- Military career
- Allegiance: German Empire; Nazi Germany
- Branch: Imperial German Army; Freikorps (Freikorps Epp); Sturmabteilung; Waffen-SS
- Service years: 1917–1918; 1919–1920; 1926–1933; 1944
- Rank: SA-Gruppenführer
- Units: Königlich Bayerisches Infanterie-Leib-Regiment; Freikorps Epp; Sturmabteilung; SS-Hauptamt; 2.SS-Sturmbrigade Dirlewanger
- Commands: I Battalion, SS-Sturmregiment 2, 2. SS-Sturmbrigade Dirlewanger
- Conflicts: World War I; Freikorps operations; World War II; Battle of Ipolysag
- Awards: Iron Cross; Wound Badge; Military Merit Order (Bavaria)

Wilhelm Ferdinand Stegmann (13 June 1899 – 15 December 1944) was a German National Socialist politician and SA leader. From 1930 to 1933, he was a member of the Reichstag for the NSDAP.

== Biography ==
Stegmann was the son of Ferdinand Stegmann and his wife Kerszens, née Schmid. From 1905 to 1917, he attended elementary school and a Realgymnasium in Munich. In 1917, he joined the Königlich Bayerisches Infanterie-Leib-Regiment as an officer cadet (Fahnenjunker) and was commissioned as a Leutnant in June 1918 during World War I. After the end of the war, he participated in 1919 street fighting in Munich as a member of the Freikorps Epp, and in 1920 he fought during the unrest in the Ruhr area. Stegmann studied agriculture at the Technical University of Munich, graduating in 1923 as a certified agricultural engineer (Diplom-Landwirt). During this time, he became acquainted with Heinrich Himmler. Until 1926, he was an estate inspector on the princely Hohenlohe domain of Schillingsfürst in Franconia. From 1926 until approximately 1933, he leased the estate himself, becoming heavily indebted. On 15 September 1923, he married Emmy Holz. The couple had four children. Around the same time, Stegmann became leader of the local chapter (Ortsgruppe) of the Bund Oberland in Schillingsfürst. He joined the NSDAP on 14 December 1925 (membership number 24,713) and became a member of the SA in 1926. From 1926 onward, he was active as a propaganda speaker for the party, especially in Neustadt an der Aisch and surrounding areas, and in 1932 he participated in the first SA leadership training school held at Burg Hoheneck in Ipsheim. From 1929 to 1930, Stegmann commanded the SA Standarte in Ansbach, and until 1932 he served as Gausturmführer, commanding all SA units across Franconia. On 15 September 1932, he was promoted to Gruppenführer. Within the NSDAP, Stegmann served as district leader (Bezirksleiter) of Franconia Gau from 1929 to 1931. On 14 September 1930, he was elected to the Reichstag as a representative for electoral district 26.

=== Assault in the Reichstag ===
On 12 May 1932, Stegmann was involved in a physical attack on journalist Helmuth Klotz in the Reichstag restaurant. He and three other NSDAP deputies were excluded from the Reichstag for 30 days. The session had to be interrupted as the deputies refused to leave the chamber. On 14 May, Stegmann, along with Fritz Weitzel and Edmund Heines, was sentenced by the Berlin-Mitte district court to three months in prison for joint assault and violent insult.

=== Conflict with Julius Streicher ===
In December 1932, Stegmann clashed with his Gauleiter Julius Streicher over funds that had been withheld from the SA. On 13 January 1933, Stegmann resigned his Reichstag mandate after being pressured to step down. He was replaced by Johann Appler. On 18 January, Stegmann became leader of the newly formed Freikorps Franken and, beginning in February, published the journal Das Freikorps, Kampfblatt für die Sauberkeit und Reinheit der Nationalsozialistischen Idee ("The Freikorps, a militant paper for the cleanliness and purity of the National Socialist idea"). On 19 January, he resigned from the NSDAP, preempting his expulsion from the party and the SA for "mutiny." Around 1,000 members, mostly from the SA in Franconia and groups in the Ruhr area, followed him into his organization. Between 1,500 and 2,000 NSDAP members left the party together with Stegmann. During the March 1933 Reichstag election campaign, the Freikorps Franken supported Adolf Hitler, claiming he represented the "true National Socialism," but campaigned against Streicher.

=== Arrest and imprisonment ===
After the March 1933 Reichstag election, Stegmann's Freikorps and its publication were banned on 13 March. Stegmann himself was arrested on 23 March 1933 and placed in protective custody in a concentration camp, officially accused of planning an assassination attempt on Julius Streicher. On 14 February 1936, he was sentenced by the Sondergericht (special court) at the Landgericht Nürnberg-Fürth to 18 months in prison. Until 1938, he was held in Nuremberg Prison, the Ebrach penitentiary, a Gestapo prison in Berlin, and later at Buchenwald. He was eventually released through Himmler's intervention and later managed a state-owned agricultural estate near Braunschweig.

== World War II ==
On 1 October 1944, Stegmann was drafted into the SS to expunge his criminal record and “restore his honor,” and was temporarily assigned to the SS-Hauptamt as an SS-Obersturmführer der Reserve. One month later, he was transferred to the SS-Sturmbrigade Dirlewanger and subsequently appointed commander of the 1st Battalion of SS-Sturmregiment 2. In December 1944, Stegmann was listed as missing in action near Ipolysag at some point between 15 and 31 December while carrying out a leader's reconnaissance, and presumed dead.

== Literature ==
- Martin Döring:»Parlamentarischer Arm der Bewegung«. Die Nationalsozialisten im Reichstag der Weimarer Republik (= Beiträge zur Geschichte des Parlamentarismus und der politischen Parteien. Band 130). Droste, Düsseldorf 2001, ISBN 3-7700-5237-4.
- Rainer Hambrecht: Der Aufstieg der NSDAP in Mittel- und Oberfranken (1925–1933) (= Nürnberger Werkstücke zur Stadt- und Landesgeschichte. Band 17). Korn und Berg, Nürnberg 1976, ISBN 3-87432-039-1.
- Eric G. Reiche: The Development of the SA in Nürnberg, 1922–1934, Cambridge 1986.
