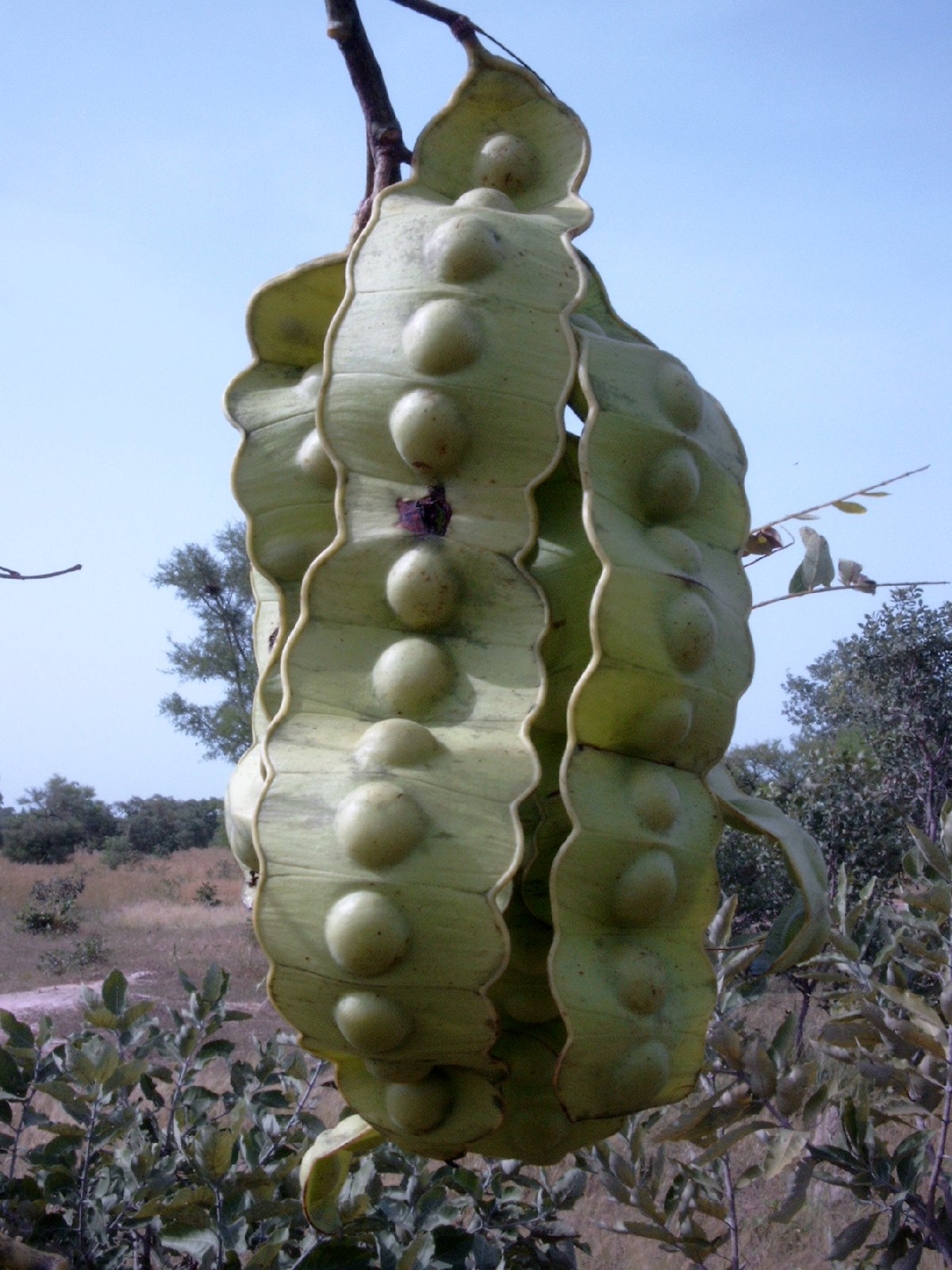
- fruit

Conservation status
- Least Concern (IUCN 3.1)

Scientific classification
- Kingdom: Plantae
- Clade: Tracheophytes
- Clade: Angiosperms
- Clade: Eudicots
- Clade: Rosids
- Order: Fabales
- Family: Fabaceae
- Subfamily: Caesalpinioideae
- Clade: Mimosoid clade
- Genus: Entada
- Species: E. africana

Binomial name
- Entada africana Guill. & Perr.

= Entada africana =

Species of flowering plant

Entada africana is a species of flowering plant in the family Fabaceae. It is native to tropical Africa. It is listed as Least Concern on the IUCN Red List Of Threatened Species.
