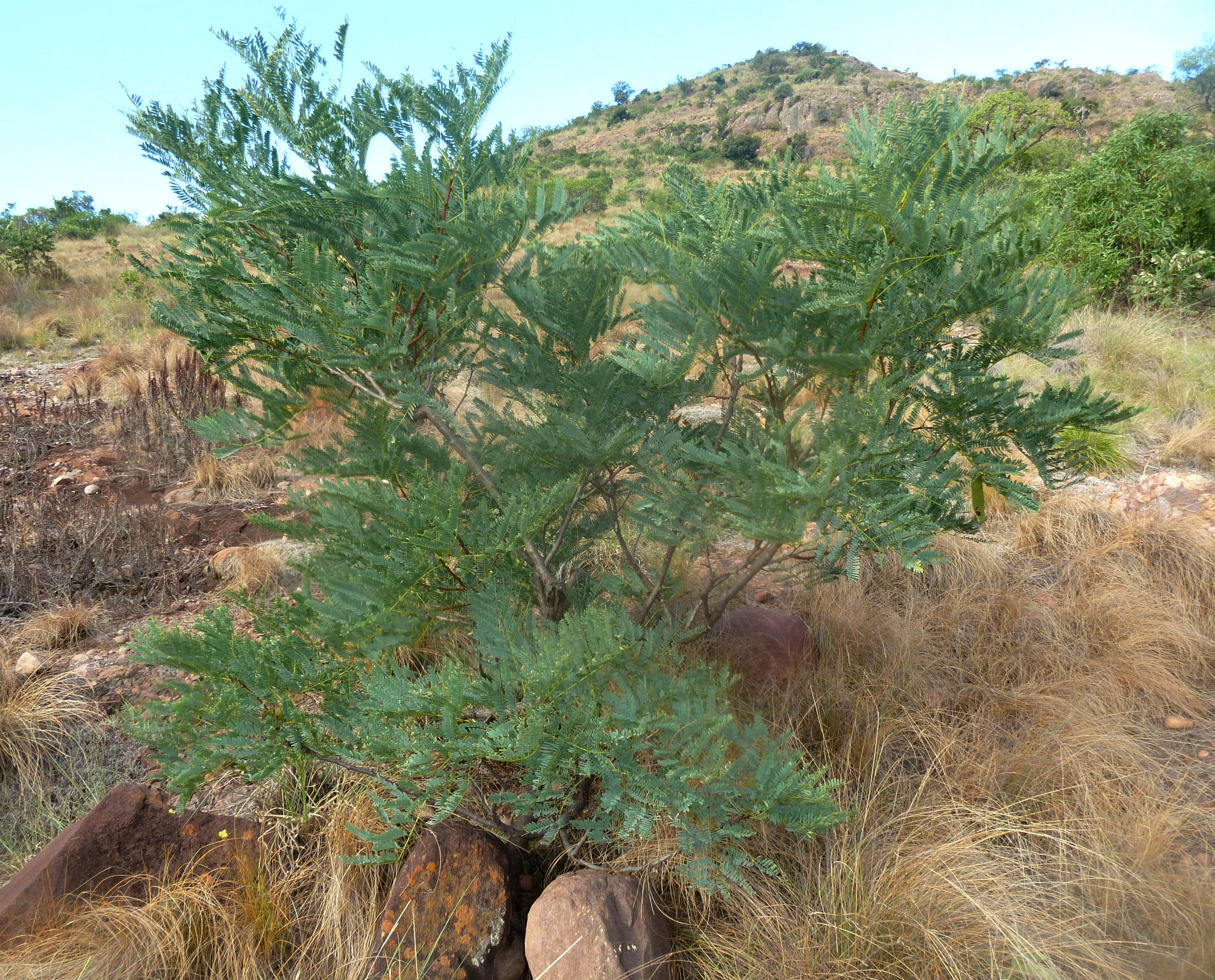

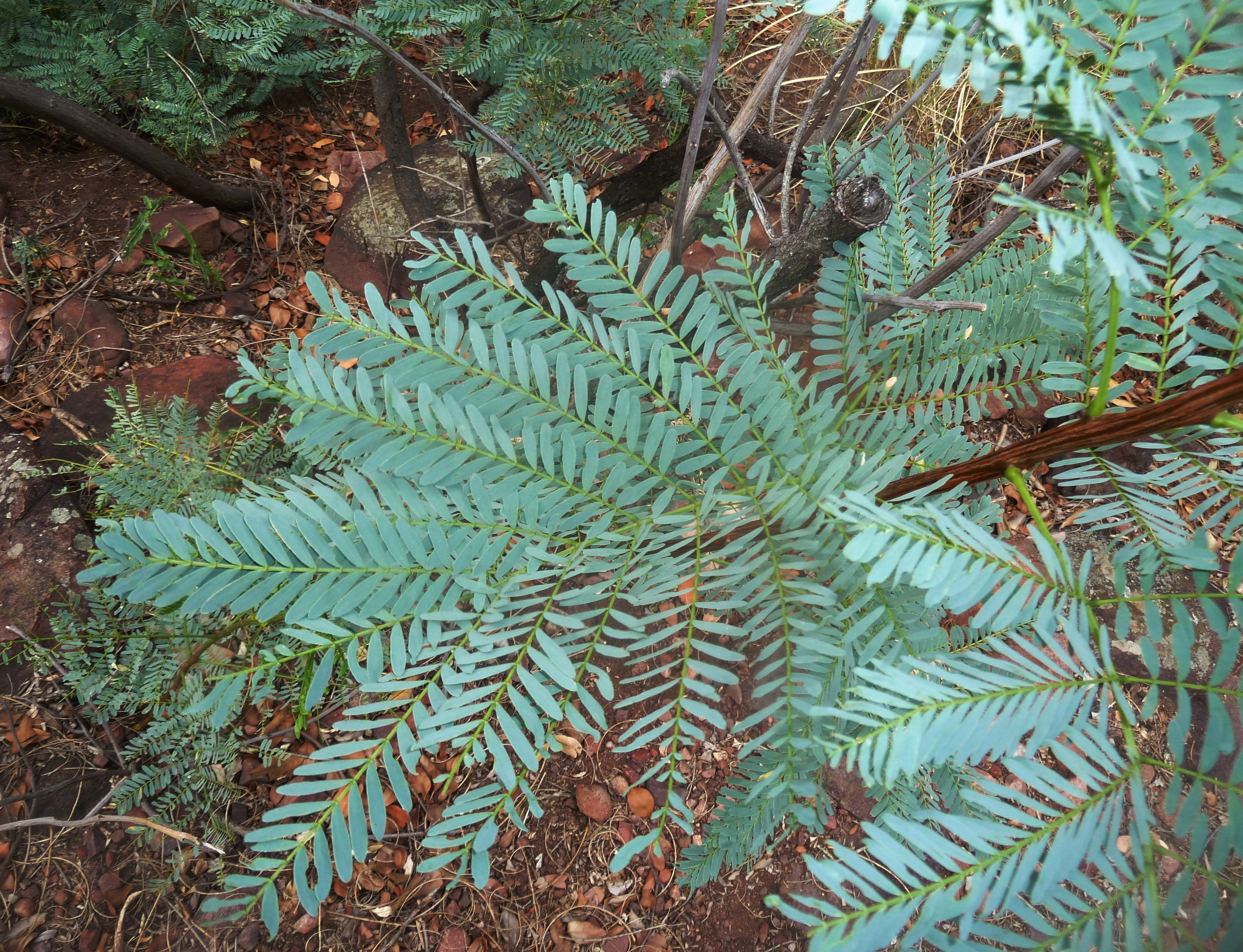
- Habit and foliage

Scientific classification
- Kingdom: Plantae
- Clade: Tracheophytes
- Clade: Angiosperms
- Clade: Eudicots
- Clade: Rosids
- Order: Fabales
- Family: Fabaceae
- Subfamily: Caesalpinioideae
- Clade: Mimosoid clade
- Genus: Entada
- Species: E. burkei

Binomial name
- Entada burkei (Benth.) S.A.O’Donnell & G.P.Lewis (2022)

Synonyms
- Elephantorrhiza burkei Benth. (1846); Elephantorrhiza elephantina var. burkei (Benth.) Merr. (1919)

= Entada burkei =

Species of legume

Entada burkei (synonym Elephantorrhiza burkei), commonly known as the elephant root or sumach bean, is a deciduous shrub or small tree in the mimosoid clade of legumes. It is native to southern Africa, in Mozambique, Zimbabwe, Botswana, and the Northern Provinces of South Africa. It grows on rocky slopes or ridges, in either woodland, grassland or scrubland. The species is named after the botanist Joseph Burke.

== Description ==
The shrub or small tree has a dense rounded crown, and usually reaches between 1 and 3 metres in height. The grey bark turns brown and eventually blackish as the tree ages. The bipinnately compound leaves measure some 25 cm long, and bear 4 to 8 pinnae with 12 to 23 pairs of leaflets each. Their fragrant, creamy white to yellow flowers appear in early summer, and are pollinated mainly by the African honeybee. Mature specimens carry their flowering racemes on branched stems some distance from the ground, and the pods are consequently conspicuous. The flower spikes grow from the leaf axils and are 5 to 10 cm long. Their elongate, flattened, brown to reddish brown pods measure up to 30 cm by 4 cm. The shape of their seeds is variable, from elliptic to almost quadrate.

== Similar species ==
It is most similar to E. elephantina, which has similar aerial parts, but consistently larger seeds. Mature specimens of E. burkei especially, produce their flowering racemes on their branched stems, and the pods consequently appear in conspicuous positions some distance above ground. Seed shape varies considerably in E. burkei, from elliptic to nearly quadrate when tightly compacted and laterally compressed in their pods. In either species the two pod valves will separate from their margin, which persists as a nearly continuous and empty frame, reminiscent of other Entada pods. The two pod valves of E. burkei roll back and persist with their margins for many months, while the pods of E. elephantina generally disintegrate and disappear more rapidly.

Species	Pod shape	Pod position	Seed dimensions
E. burkei	long and narrow	clearly above ground	9-15 x 8-12 x 5–7 mm
E. elephantina	short and broad	on or near ground	17-26 x 13-18 x 6–13 mm

== Gallery ==
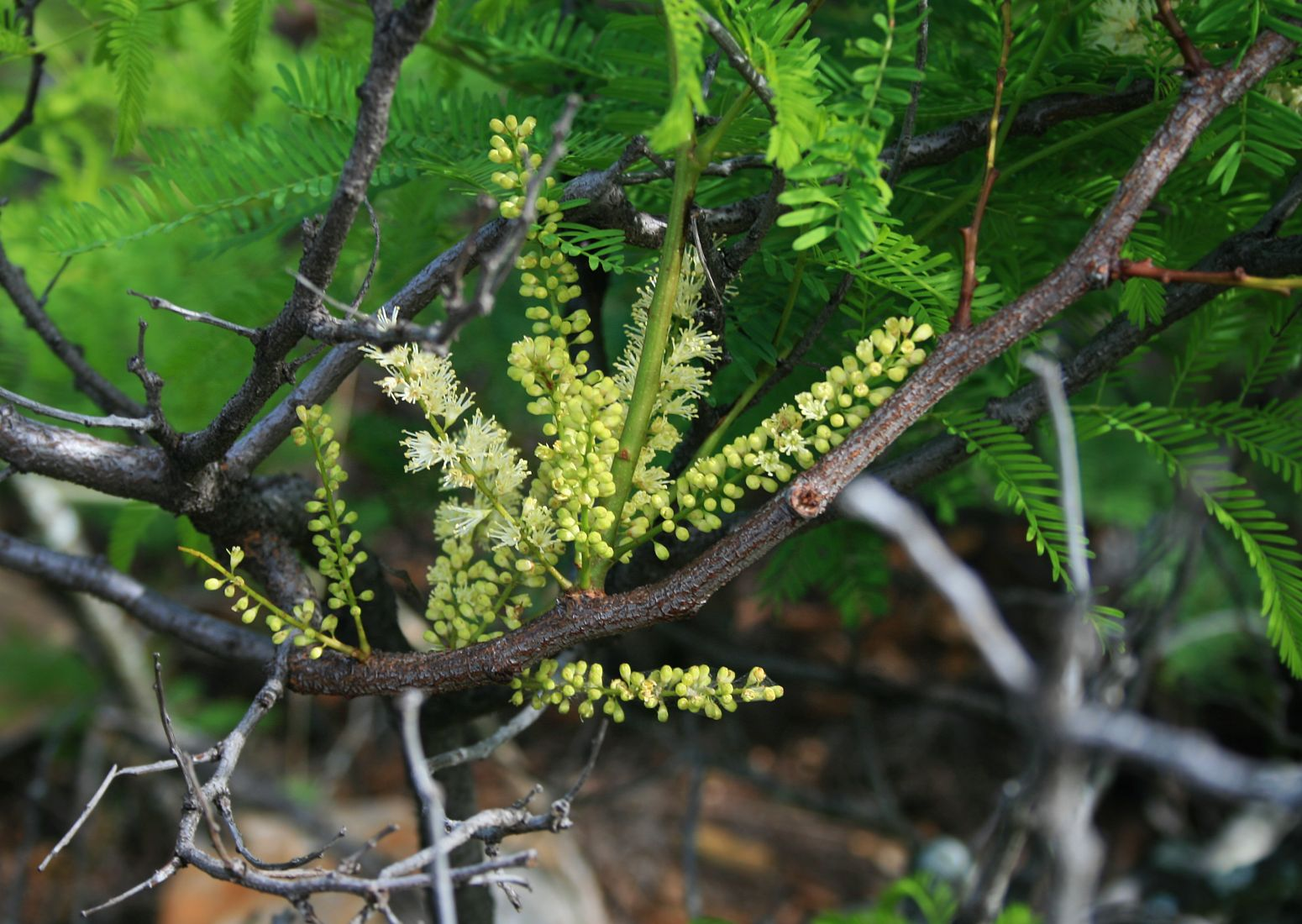
Inflorescences

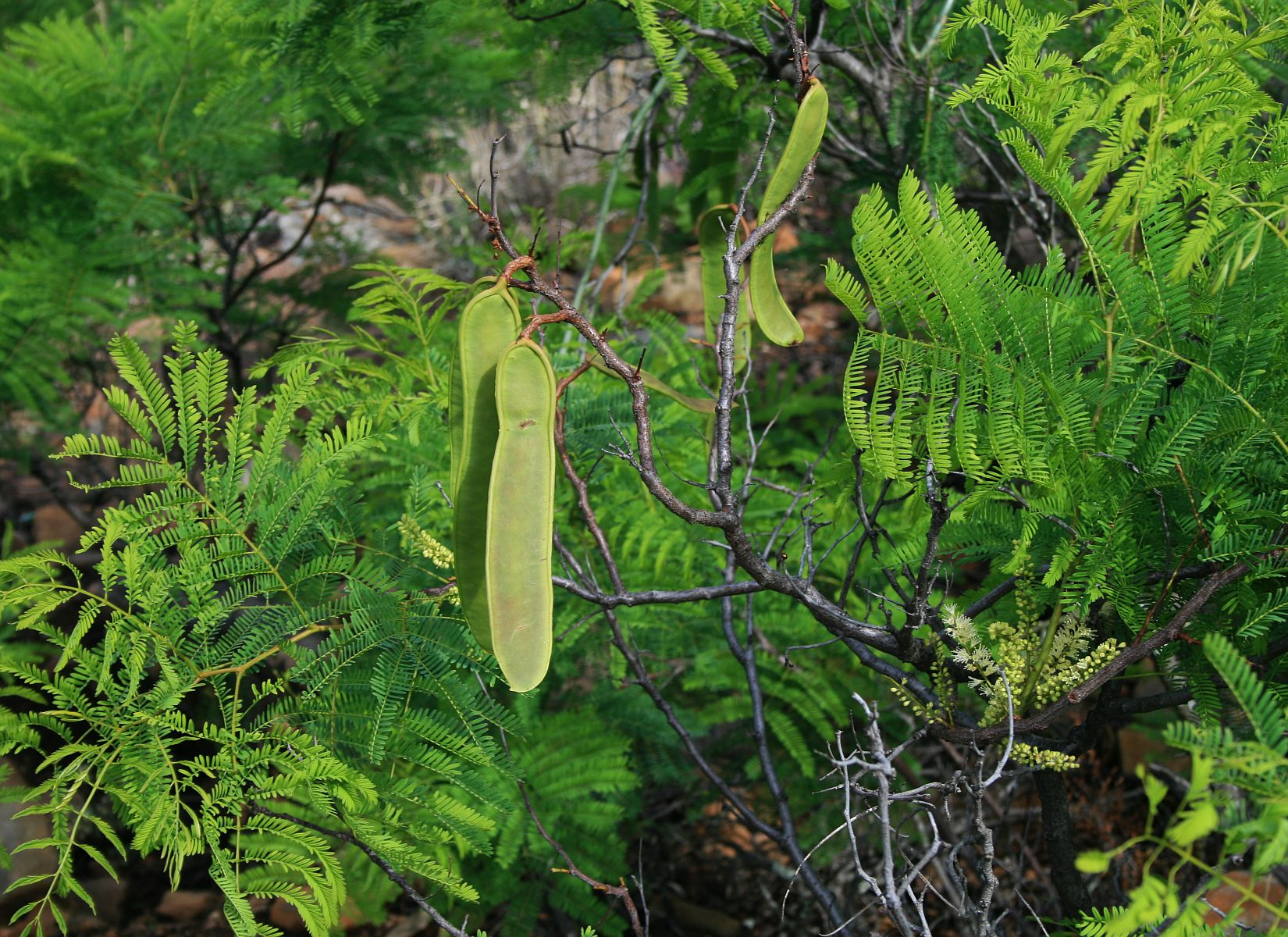
Green seed pods

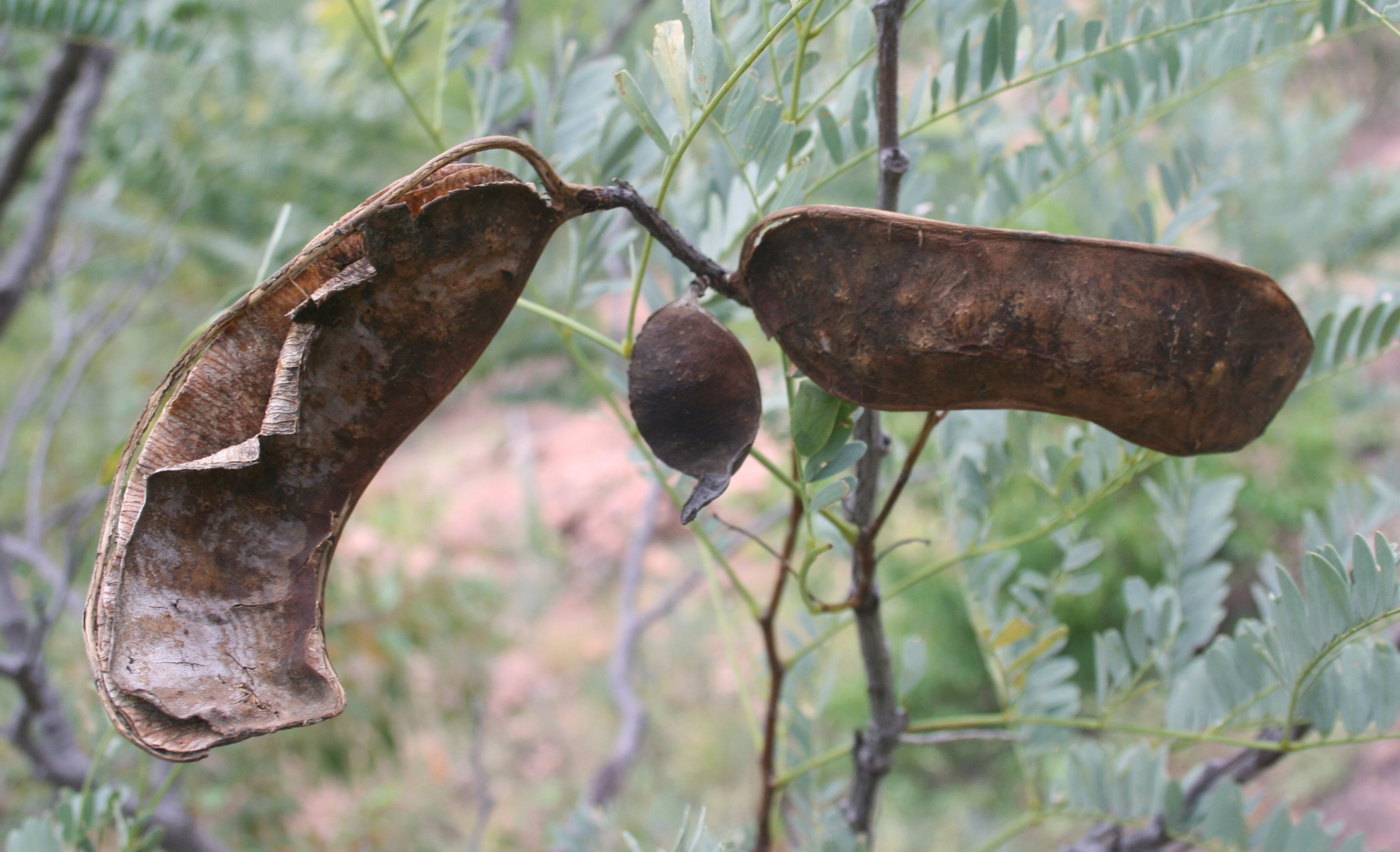
Seed pod valves separating
