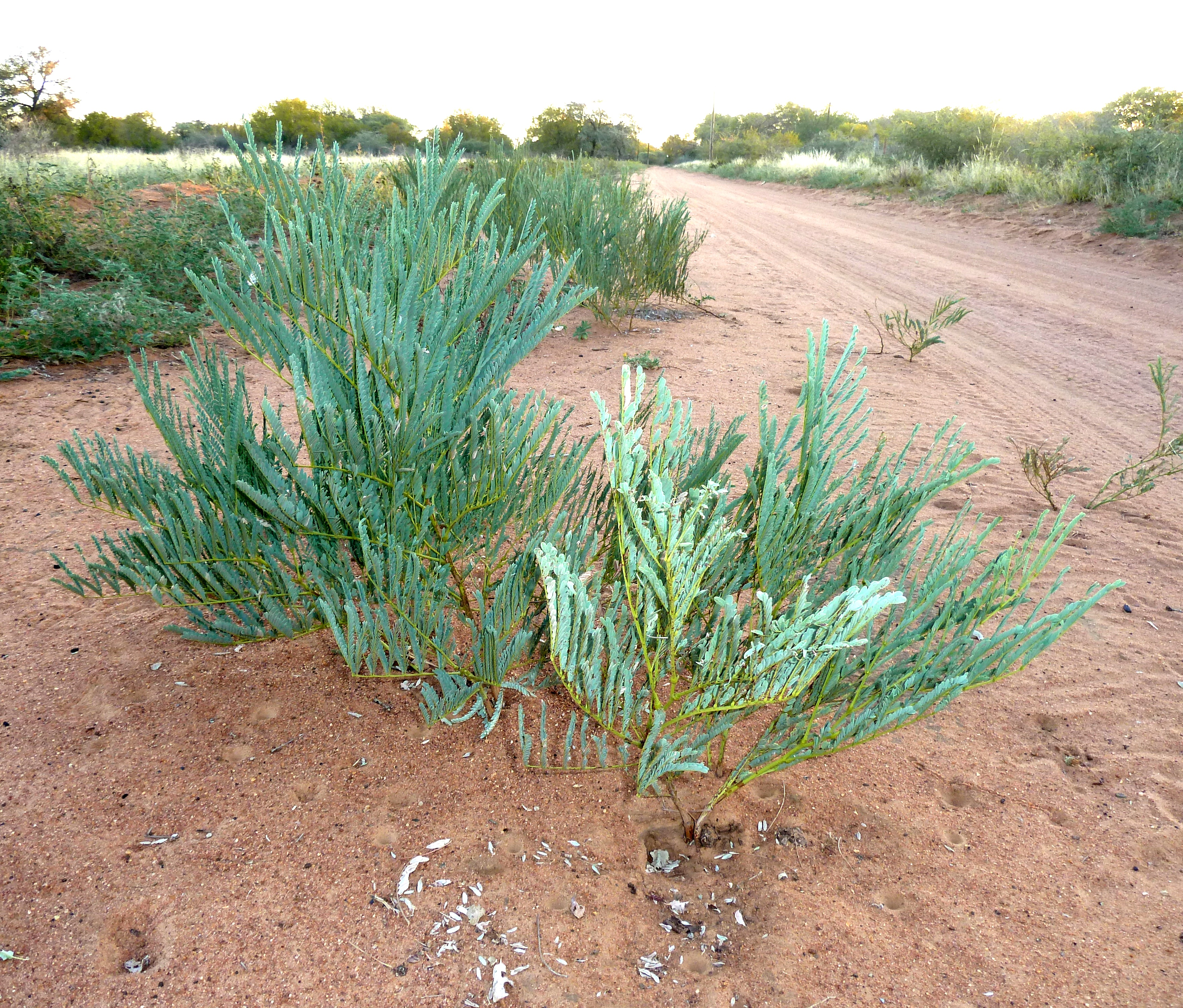

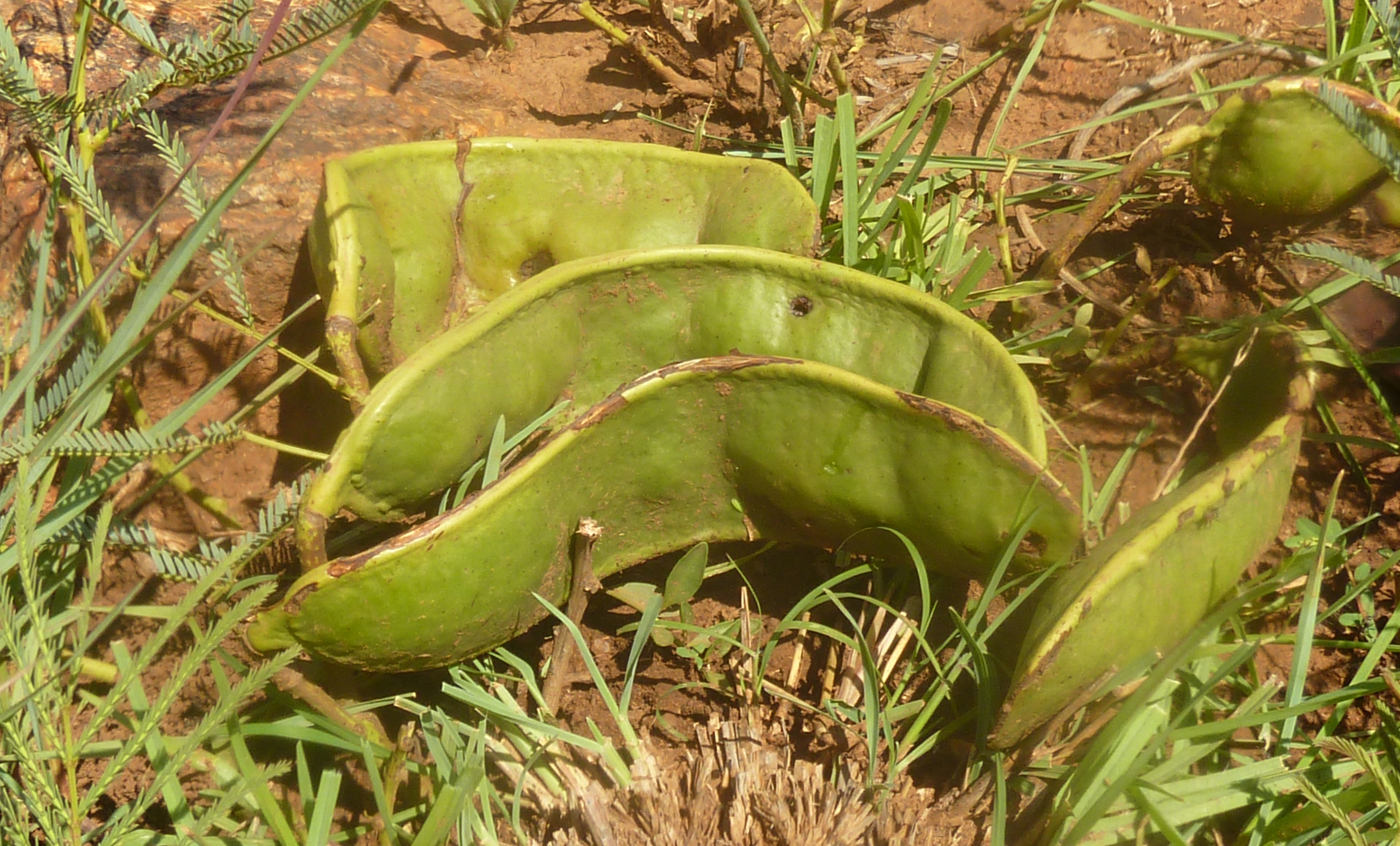
- Winter habit and green seed pods with thickened margins resting on ground

Conservation status
- Least Concern (SANBI Red List)

Scientific classification
- Kingdom: Plantae
- Clade: Tracheophytes
- Clade: Angiosperms
- Clade: Eudicots
- Clade: Rosids
- Order: Fabales
- Family: Fabaceae
- Subfamily: Caesalpinioideae
- Clade: Mimosoid clade
- Genus: Entada
- Species: E. elephantina

Binomial name
- Entada elephantina (Burch.) S.A.O’Donnell & G.P.Lewis (2022)

Synonyms
- Acacia elephantina Burch. (1824); Acacia elephantorrhiza Burch. ex DC. (1825); Elephantorrhiza burchellii Benth. (1841), nom. superfl.; Elephantorrhiza elephantina (Burch.) Skeels (1909); Prosopis elephantina (Burch.) E.Mey. (1836); Prosopis elephantorrhiza Spreng. (1827)

= Entada elephantina =

Species of legume

Entada elephantina, commonly known as the eland's wattle or elephant's root, is a species of subshrub in the mimosoid clade of legumes. It occurs widely in southern Africa, ranging from Mozambique, Zimbabwe, Botswana, and Namibia through Eswatini, Lesotho, and South Africa.

The species was first described as Acacia elephantina by William John Burchell in 1824. It has been known by a number of synonynms. In 2022 Shawn A. O'Donnell and Gwilym Peter Lewis placed the species in genus Entada as E. elephantina.

== Description ==
They have a suffrutescent habit typical of their genus. They produce unbranched and unarmed aerial stems of less than a metre tall. The various populations show considerable variation in terms of the number of pinnae pairs and the number, size and shape of the leaflets. They flower from September to November and are pollinated mainly by the African honeybee. The flowering racemes are typically confined to the lower part of the stem, so that the pods are usually suspended just above ground level, or alternatively rest inconspicuously on the ground. Considerable size variation has been noted, and polyploidy was suspected.

== Similar species ==
Entada burkei has similar aerial parts, but its seeds are consistently smaller than those of E. elephantina. Mature specimens of E. burkei especially, produce their flowering racemes on the branched stems, so that the pods appear in conspicuous positions some distance above ground. Seed shape varies considerably in E. burkei, from elliptic to nearly quadrate if they are tightly compacted and laterally compressed in their pods. In either species the two pod valves will separate from their margin, which persists as a nearly continuous and empty frame, reminiscent of some Entada pods. Pods of E. elephantina generally disintegrate and disappear more rapidly than those of E. burkei, where the two pod valves roll back and persist with their margins for many months.

| Species | Pod shape | Pod position | Seed dimensions |
|---|---|---|---|
| E. elephantina | short and broad | on or near ground | 17-26 x 13-18 x 6-13 mm |
| E. burkei | long and narrow | clearly above ground | 9-15 x 8-12 x 5-7 mm |

== Gallery ==
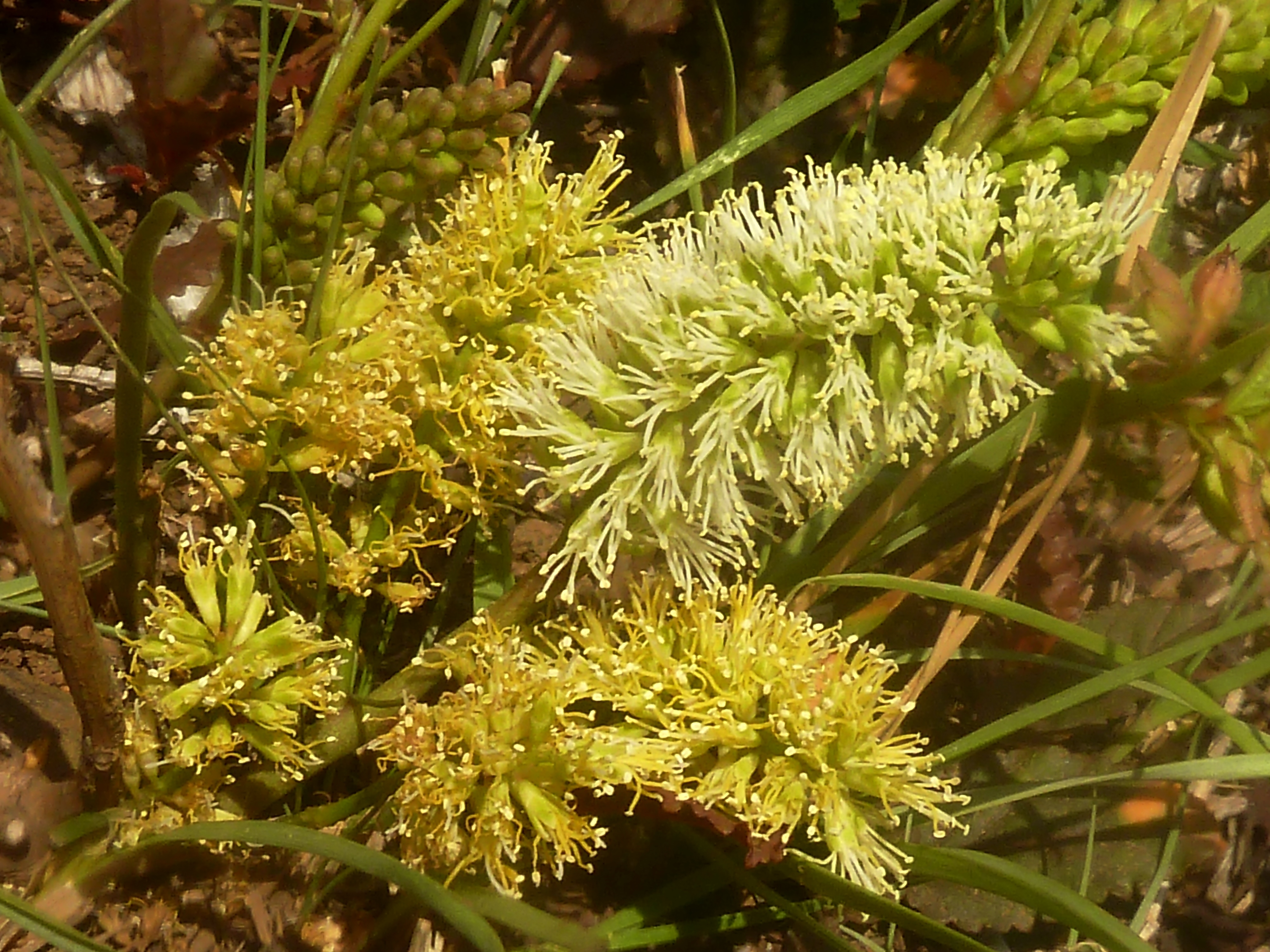
racemes at ground level

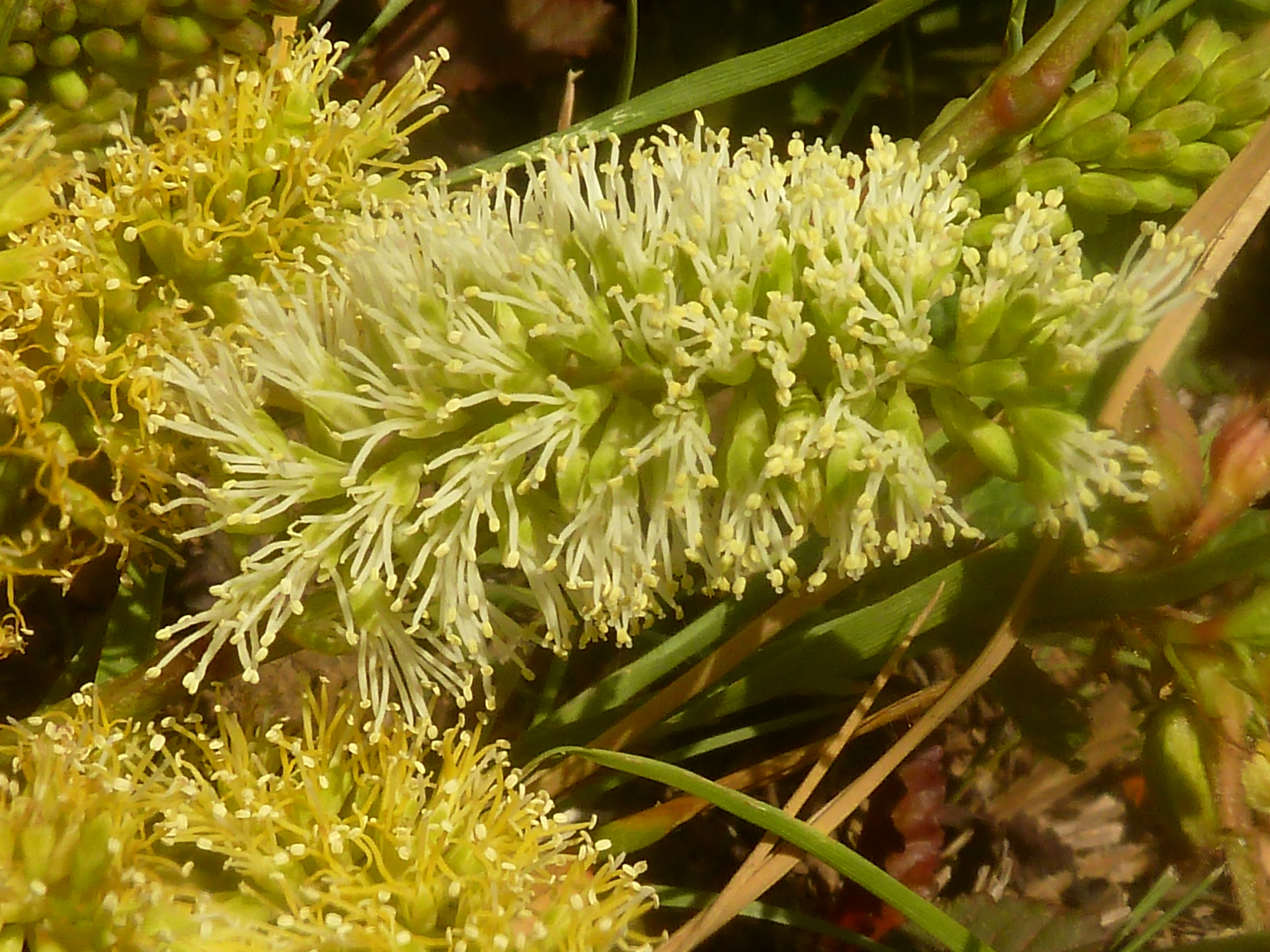
close-up of raceme

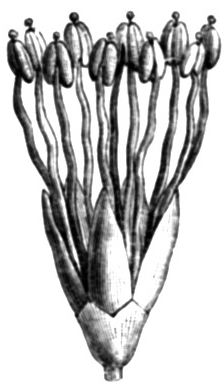
illustration of flower

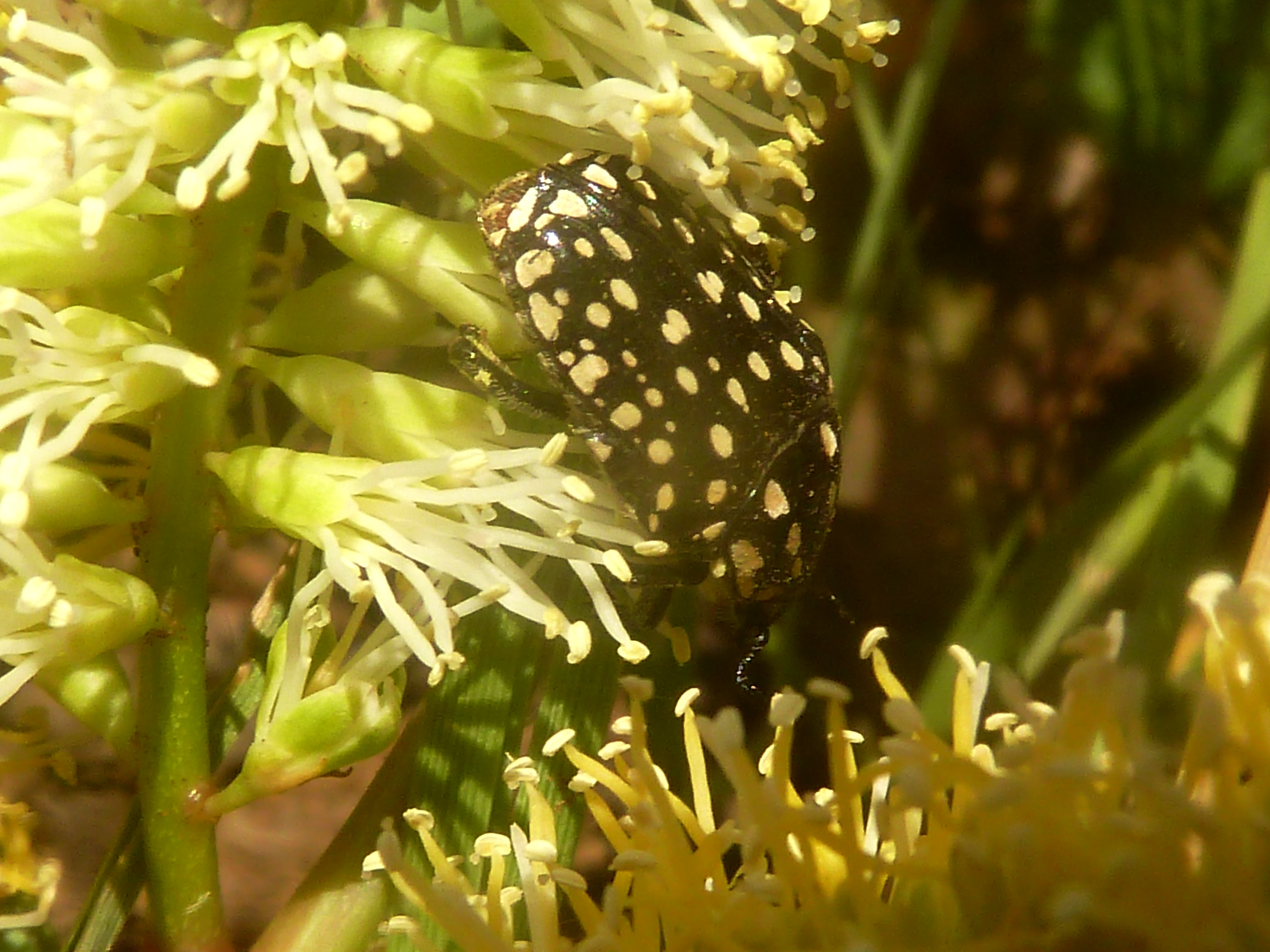
beetle pollinating

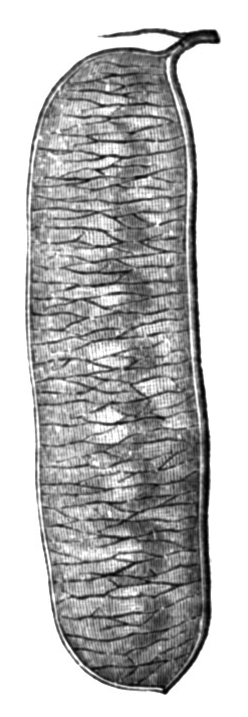
illustration of seed pod

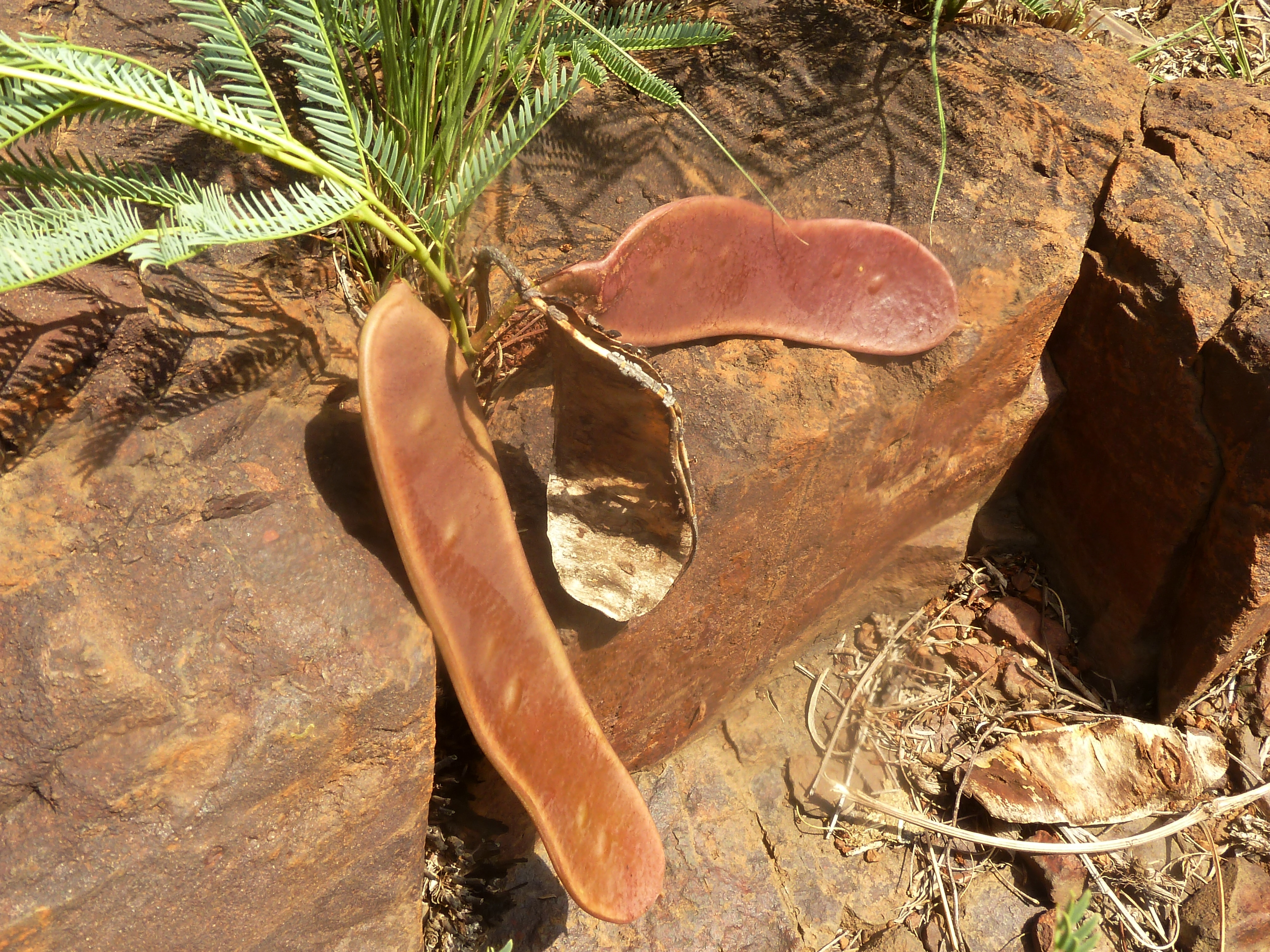
dehiscing seed pod

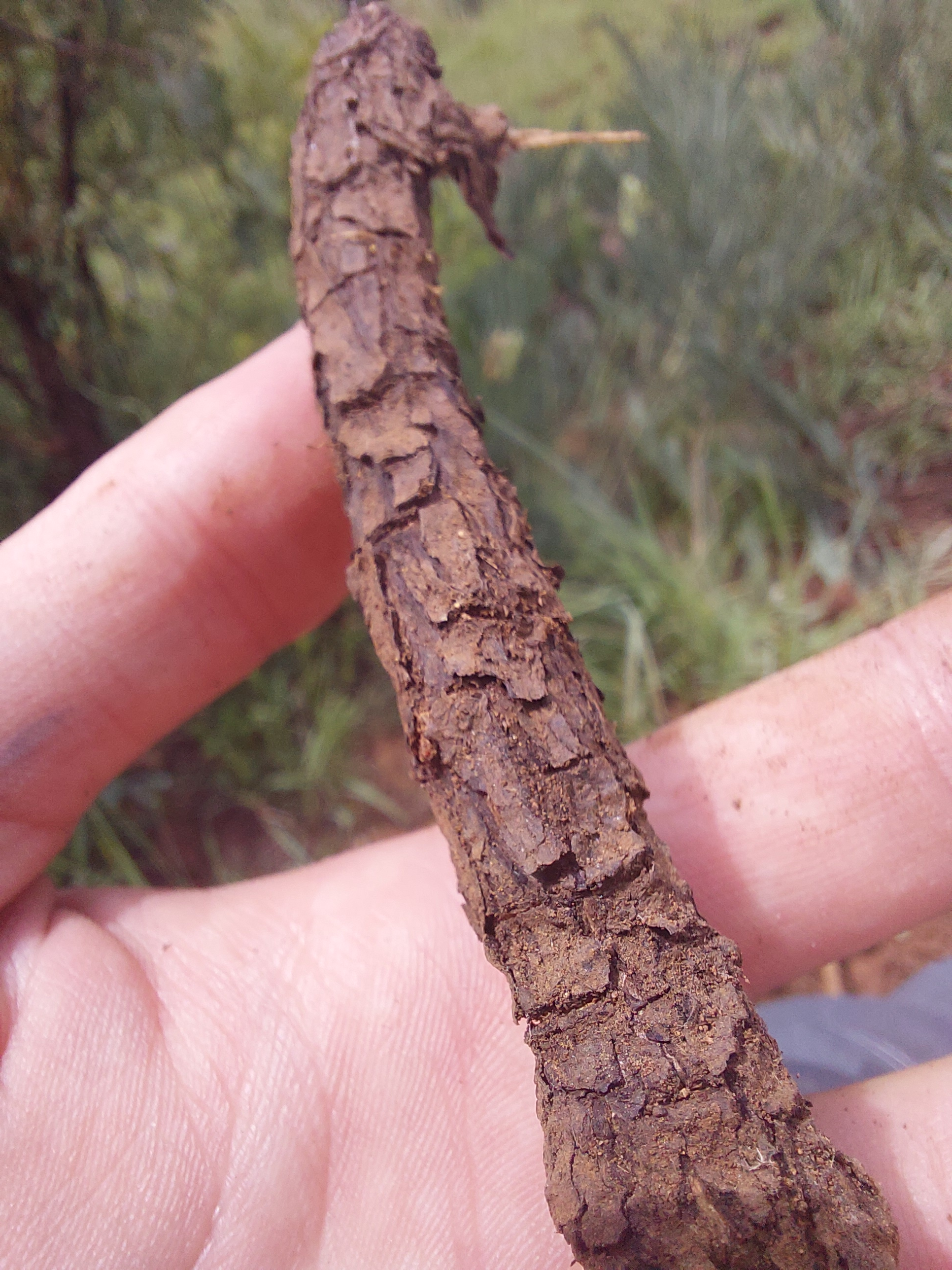
Underground axis (Branch)
